= Thomas Lynch =

Thomas or Tom(my) Lynch may refer to:

== Politics ==
- Thomas Lynch (statesman) (1727–1776), South Carolina delegate to the Continental Congress
- Thomas Lynch Jr. (1749–1779), signer of the Declaration of Independence
- Thomas Lynch (Wisconsin politician) (1844–1898), United States congressman from Wisconsin
- Thomas Lynch (governor) (1603–1684), Governor of Jamaica
- Thomas C. Lynch (1904–1986), California state attorney general, 1964–1971
- Thomas Lynch (mayor), mayor of Galway
- Thomas K. Lynch (born 1947), American municipal administrator and politician in Barnstable, Massachusetts

== Sports ==
=== Baseball ===
- Thomas Lynch (baseball executive) (1859–1924), American baseball umpire and National League president
- Thomas Lynch (pitcher) (1863–1903), American baseball pitcher for Chicago during the 1884 season
- Tom Lynch (baseball) (1860–1955), American baseball outfielder for Wilmington and Philadelphia during the 1884 and 1885 seasons

=== Football (soccer) ===
- Thomas Lynch (footballer) (1907–1976), Welsh football goalkeeper
- Tom Lynch (soccer), American soccer midfielder
- Tommy Lynch (footballer) (born 1964), Irish former footballer

=== Rugby ===
- Tom Lynch (rugby union) (1892–1950), New Zealand rugby union footballer, father of the below
- Thomas Lynch (rugby, born 1927) (1927–2006), New Zealand rugby union and rugby league footballer, son of the above

=== Other ===
- Tom Lynch (American football) (born 1955), former American football guard
- Tom Lynch (Australian footballer, born 1990), Australian rules footballer for Adelaide, formerly St Kilda
- Tom Lynch (Australian footballer, born 1992), Australian rules footballer for Richmond, formerly Gold Coast

== Others ==
- Thomas Lynch (admiral) (born 1942), retired American Navy rear admiral
- Thomas J. Lynch (1916–1944), American World War II flying ace
- Thomas J. Lynch (academic), American oncologist
- Thomas Lynch (criminal) (18??–1914), see 1914 in organized crime
- Thomas Lynch (poet) (born 1948), American poet and undertaker
- Thomas Lynch (psychiatrist) (1922–2005), Irish psychiatrist
- Thomas Lynch (set designer), professor at the University of Washington School of Drama
- Thomas Kerr Lynch (1818–1891), Irish explorer
- Thomas R. Lynch (born 1956), American psychologist and author
- Thomas W. Lynch (born 1956), American television series creator and executive producer
- Thomas Toke Lynch (1818–1871), English nonconformist minister and hymn-writer
