= Plan of Union =

Plan of Union may refer to:

- Albany Plan of Union, a 1754 proposal by Benjamin Franklin at the Albany Congress of representatives of the English colonies in North America held in Albany, New York
- Galloway's Plan of Union, a 1774 proposal by Pennsylvania Conservative Joseph Galloway to keep the English North American colonies in the British Empire
- Plan of Union of 1801, an agreement between Congregationalist and Presbyterian churches in the United States for mutual support and joint effort in the establishment of new congregations
