= Grand Council =

Grand Council may refer to:

- Grand Council (Qing dynasty), an important policy-making body in the Qing Empire
- Great Council of Venice, legislative body that existed from 1172 to 1797
- Grand Conseil, two institutions during the Ancien Régime in France
- Grand Council (Switzerland), a unicameral legislative style adopted by a number of cantons in Switzerland.
  - Grand Council also refers to the enlarged legislative body in the cities of the Old Swiss Confederation between the 14th and early 16th centuries, and later served as one of two chambers of the Helvetic Republic parliament from 1798 to 1800.
- Grand Council of Fascism, the main body of Mussolini's Fascist government in Italy
- Grand Council of the Crees, the political body that represents the approximately 14,000 Crees of the James Bay and Nunavik regions
- Grand Council (Mi'kmaq)
- Grand Council on the Auglaize River 1792, and again in 1793, by the Western Confederacy during the Northwest Indian War

== See also ==
- Grand and General Council, the parliament of San Marino
- Grand Council, an indirectly-elected conciliar government proposed as part of both the Albany Plan and the Galloway Plan for union between the Thirteen Colonies
