= American Bicentennial Series =

American Bicentennial Series may refer to:

- Bicentennial Series, a series of American stamps commemorating the Bicentennial in 1976
- The Kent Family Chronicles (The American Bicentennial Series), a series of eight novels by John Jakes
- Bicentennial Minutes, a series of short educational American television segments commemorating the bicentennial of the American Revolution
- United States Bicentennial coinage of 1975-1976
