= Hopsewee =

Historic house in South Carolina, United States

- U.S. National Register of Historic Places
- U.S. National Historic Landmark
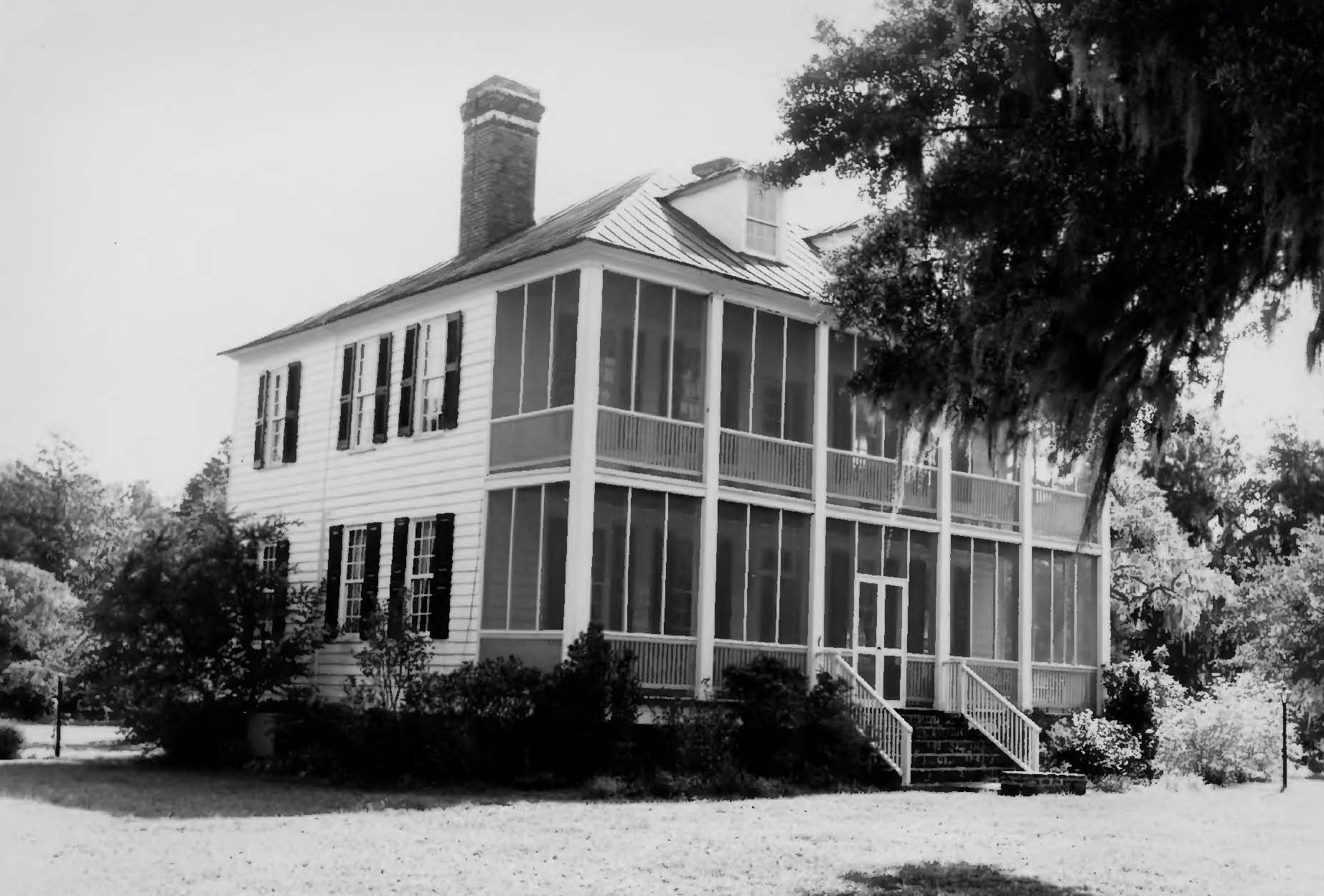
- Hopsewee in 1971

- Location within South Carolina Location within the United States
- Nearest city: Georgetown, South Carolina
- Coordinates: 33°12′38″N 79°23′5″W
- Built: 1735
- NRHP reference No.: 71000782

Significant dates
- Added to NRHP: January 25, 1971
- Designated NHL: November 11, 1971

Hopsewee Plantation, also known as the Thomas Lynch, Jr., Birthplace or Hopsewee-on-the-Santee, is a plantation house built in 1735 near Georgetown, South Carolina, in the Lowcountry. It was the main house of a rice plantation and the birthplace of Thomas Lynch, Jr., a Founding Father who was a signer of the Declaration of Independence.

Lynch had been struggling with illness in 1779 and planned a trip with his wife to St. Eustatius in the West Indies for respite. He made a will before departure, stipulating that heirs of his female relatives (he had three sisters) would have to change their surname to Lynch in order to inherit his estate, known as Peachtree Plantation. Lynch owned two other plantations and held more than 250 enslaved African Americans, who were counted as property. He and his wife sailed for St. Eustatius, but their ship disappeared at sea in a storm and was never found.

Lynch's birthplace, Hopsewee, still stands in South Carolina. The Lynch family had sold the house in 1752 to Robert Hume whose son, John Hume, lived at Hopsewee in the winter after inheriting it. Upon his death in 1841, his own son, John Hume Lucas, inherited the house. John Hume Lucas died in 1853.

Like many Santee plantations, Hopesewee was abandoned during the Civil War. After the war, rice was never planted again, but the Lucas family continued to occupy Hopsewee until 1925. In September 1949, Col. and Mrs. Wilkinson bought the house and occupied it.

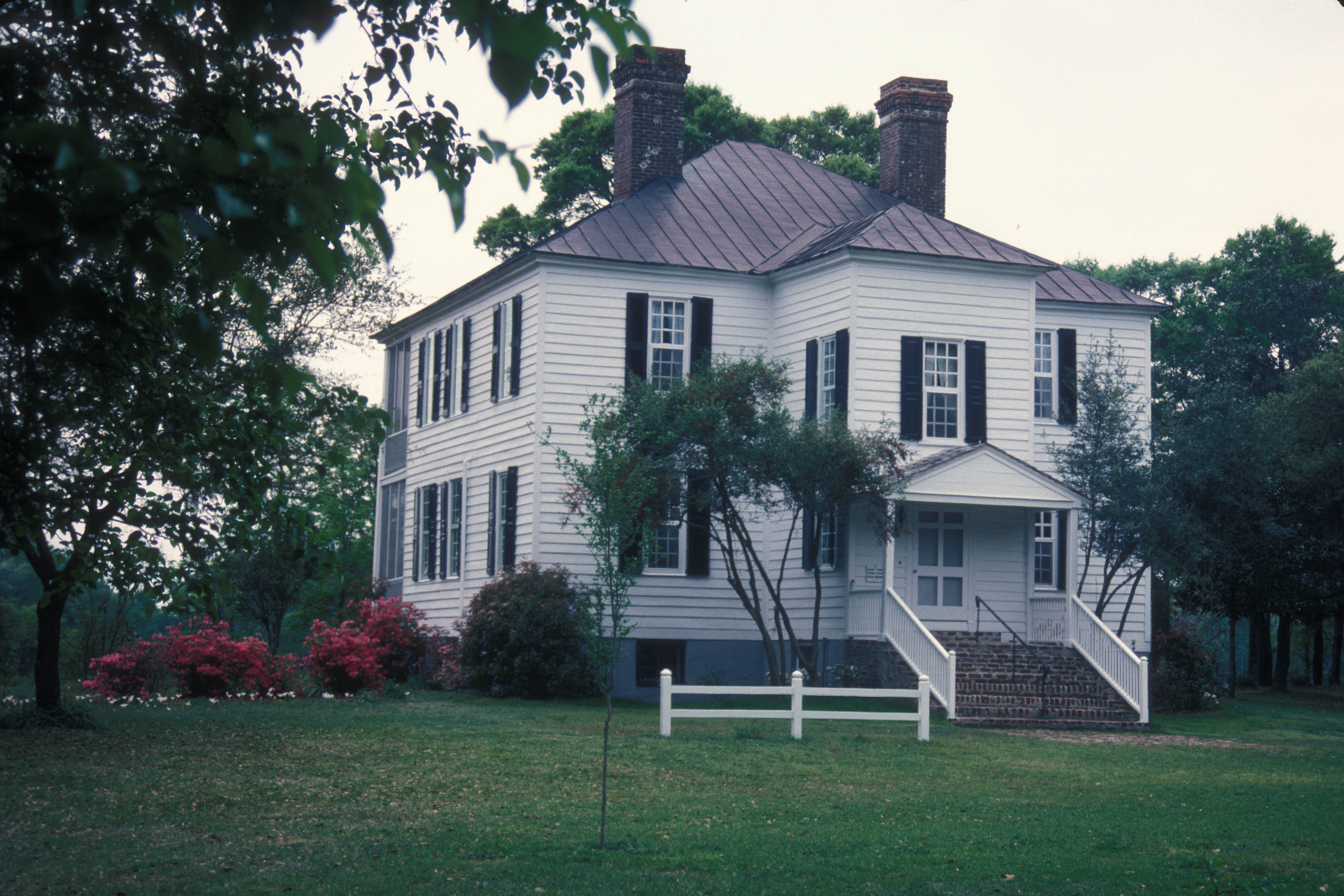
Hopsewee in 1971

According to the National Park Service, "the frame building, a fine example of a Carolina low country; referred to as (Low Country.) after the War of 1812; plantation house, showing West Indian influence, with its double-tiered piazza and dormered hip roof."

The house is made of black cypress and rests on a brick foundation which forms a cellar. The house is forty feet wide and fifty feet deep. Each floor has four rooms with a central hall. The piazzas were added in 1845 and replace an earlier verandah.

It was declared a National Historic Landmark in 1971.

It is located about 13 miles south of Georgetown, with access to U.S. Highway 17, in the vicinity of North Santee on the North Santee River.

The house continues to be used as a private residence. It is open to the public at certain hours for tours. It is furnished with 18th and 19th century period furniture.

== See also ==
- List of National Historic Landmarks in South Carolina
- National Register of Historic Places listings in Georgetown County, South Carolina
