= First Continental Congress =

1774 meeting of American colonial delegates

- Part of the American Revolution
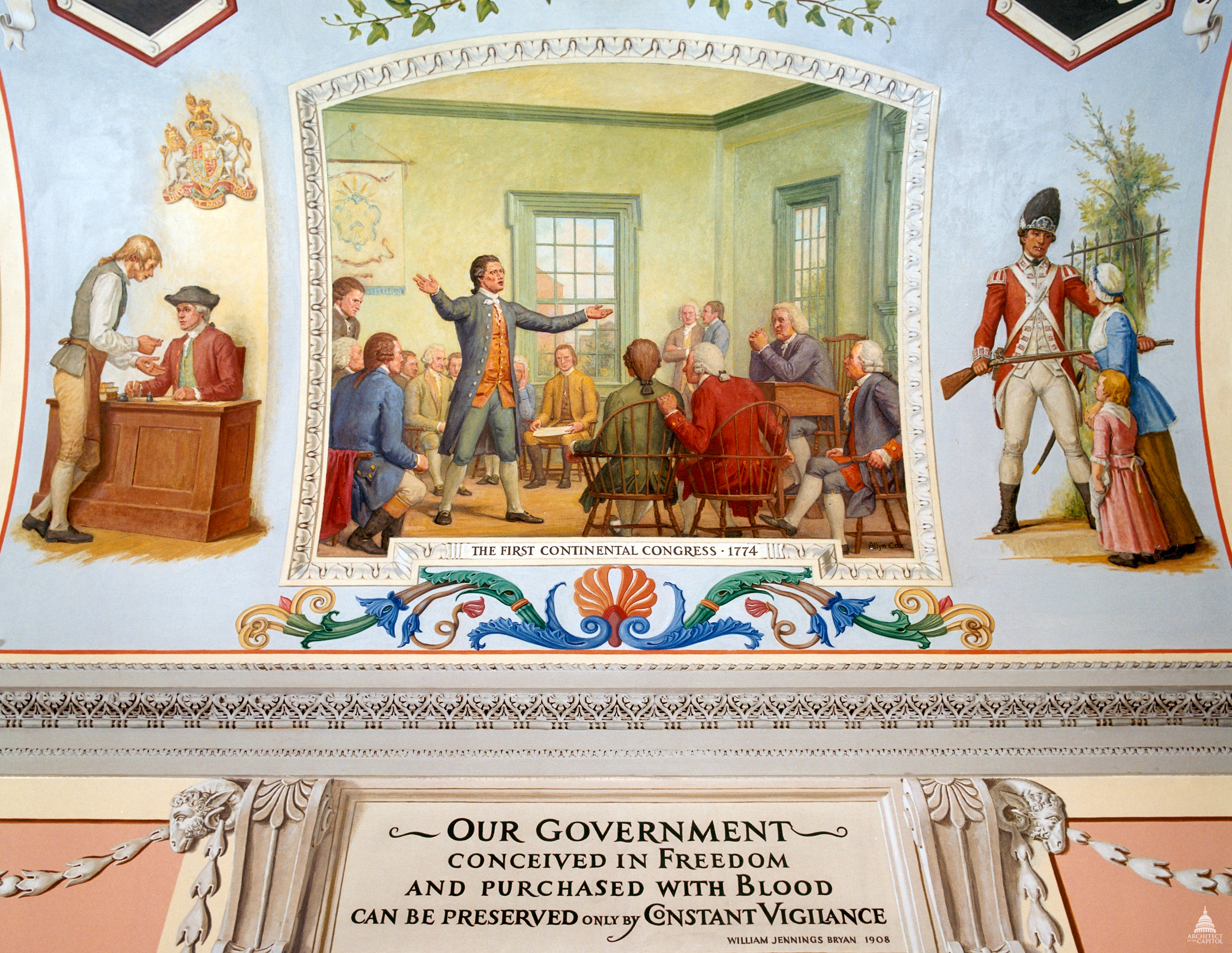

Type
- Type: Unicameral

History
- Established: September 5, 1774
- Disbanded: October 26, 1774
- Preceded by: Stamp Act Congress
- Succeeded by: Second Continental Congress

Leadership
- President: Peyton Randolph (through October 22, 1774); Henry Middleton
- Secretary: Charles Thomson
- Seats: 56 from 12 of the 13 colonies

Meeting place
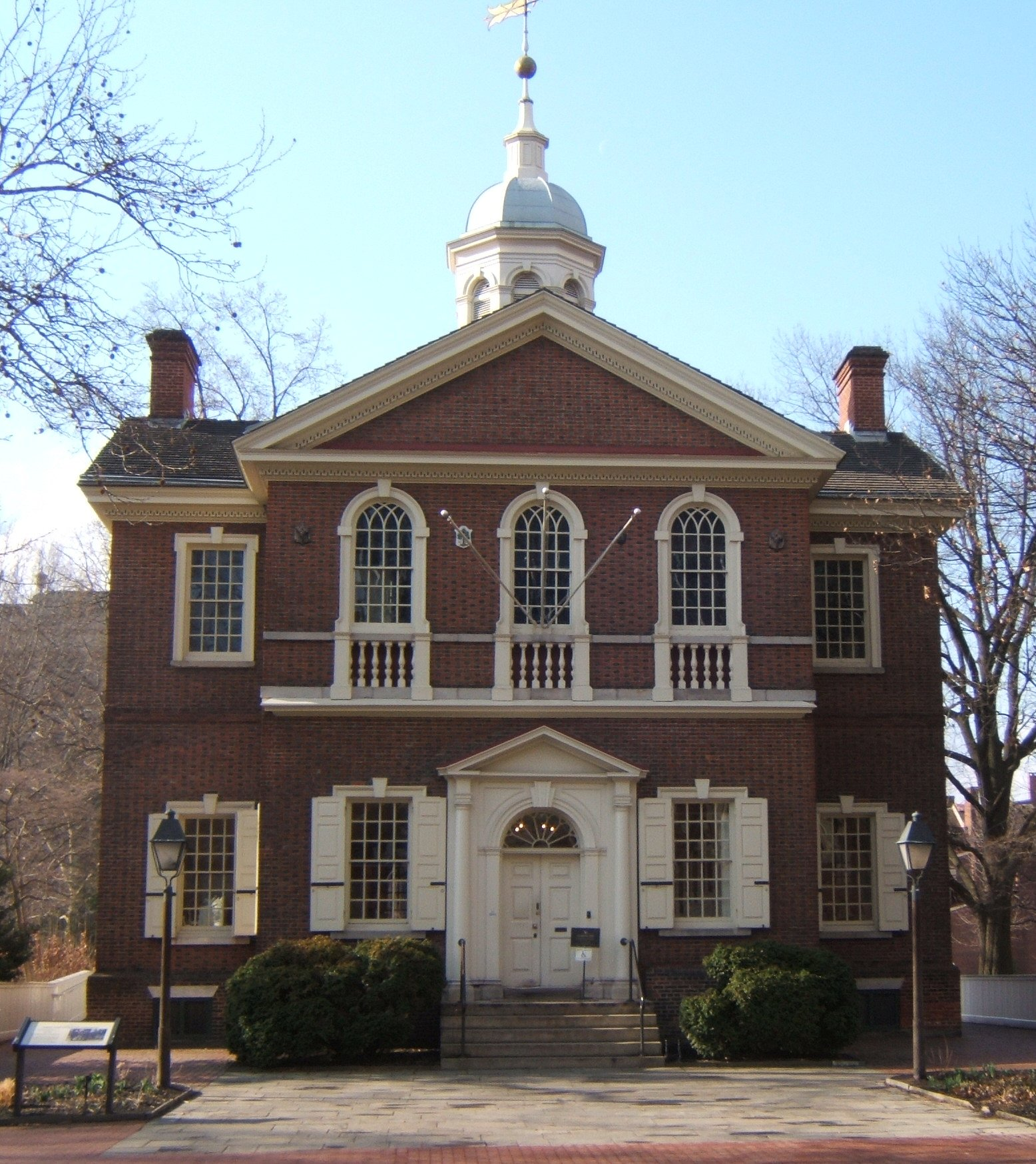
- Carpenters' Hall in Philadelphia

The First Continental Congress was a meeting of delegates of twelve of the Thirteen Colonies (Georgia did not attend) held from September 5 to October 26, 1774, at Carpenters' Hall in Philadelphia at the beginning of the American Revolution. The meeting was organized by the delegates just after the British Navy implemented a blockade of Boston Harbor and the Parliament of Great Britain passed the punitive Intolerable Acts in response to the Boston Tea Party.

During the opening weeks of the Congress, the delegates conducted a spirited discussion about how the colonies could collectively respond to the British government's coercive actions, and they worked to make a common cause. As a prelude to its decisions, the Congress's first action was the adoption of the Suffolk Resolves, a measure drawn up by several counties in Massachusetts that included a declaration of grievances, called for a trade boycott of British goods, and urged each colony to set up and train its own militia. A less radical plan was then proposed to create a Union of Great Britain and the Colonies, but the delegates tabled the measure and later struck it from the record of their proceedings.

The First Continental Congress agreed on a Declaration and Resolves that included the Continental Association, a proposal for an embargo on British trade. They also drew up a Petition to the King pleading for redress of their grievances and repeal of the Intolerable Acts. That appeal was unsuccessful, leading delegates from the colonies to convene the Second Continental Congress, also held in Philadelphia, the following May, shortly after the Battles of Lexington and Concord, to organize the defense of the colonies in the American Revolutionary War.

== Convention ==
The Congress met from September 5 to October 26, 1774, in Carpenters' Hall in Philadelphia with delegates from 12 of the Thirteen Colonies participating, Georgia being the one colony not to attend. The delegates were elected by the people of the respective colonies, the colonial legislature, or by the Committee of Correspondence of a colony. Loyalist sentiments outweighed Patriot views in Georgia, leading that colony to not immediately join the revolutionary cause until the following year when it sent delegates to the Second Continental Congress.

On September 6th a resolution was offered by Thomas Cushing that the daily sessions of Congress begin with a prayer. Samuel Adams supported the idea, where he proposed that Anglican clergyman Reverend Jacob Duché, lead the assembly in prayer. Duche' first read from the 35th Psalm, which was considered appropriate at that uncertain point in time. The Psalm was then followed with a somewhat lengthy prayer, which was generally well received by the delegates.

Peyton Randolph of Virginia was elected as president of the Congress on the opening day, and he served through October 22 when ill health forced him to retire from his station, and Henry Middleton of South Carolina was elected in his place for the balance of the session. Charles Thomson, leader of the Philadelphia Committee of Correspondence, was selected as the congressional secretary. The rules adopted by the delegates were designed to guard the equality of participants and to promote free-flowing debate.

As the deliberations progressed, it became clear that those in attendance were not of one mind concerning why they were there. Conservatives such as Joseph Galloway (Pennsylvania), John Dickinson (Pennsylvania), John Jay (New York), and Edward Rutledge (South Carolina) believed their task to be forging policies to pressure Parliament to rescind its unreasonable acts. Their ultimate goal was to develop a reasonable solution to the difficulties and bring about reconciliation between the Colonies and Great Britain. Others such as Patrick Henry (Virginia), Roger Sherman (Connecticut), Samuel Adams (Massachusetts), and John Adams (Massachusetts) believed their task to be developing a decisive statement of the rights and liberties of the Colonies. Their ultimate goal was to end what they felt to be the abuses of parliamentary authority and to retain their rights, which had been guaranteed under Colonial charters and the English constitution.

Roger Sherman denied the legislative authority of Parliament, and Patrick Henry believed that the Congress needed to develop a completely new system of government, independent from Great Britain, for the existing Colonial governments were already dissolved. In contrast to these ideas, Joseph Galloway put forward a "Plan of Union" which suggested that an American legislative body should be formed with some authority, whose consent would be required for imperial measures.

== Declaration and resolves ==
In the end, the voices of compromise carried the day. Rather than calling for independence, the First Continental Congress passed and signed the Continental Association in its Declaration and Resolves, which called for a boycott of British goods to take effect in December 1774. After Congress signed on October 20, 1774, embracing non-exportation, they also planned nonimportation of slaves beginning December 1, which would have abolished the slave trade in the United States of America 33 years before it actually ended.

== Accomplishments ==
The primary accomplishment of the First Continental Congress was a compact among the colonies to boycott British goods beginning on December 1, 1774, unless parliament should rescind the Intolerable Acts.

Additionally, Great Britain's colonies in the West Indies were threatened with a boycott unless they agreed to non-importation of British goods. Imports from Britain dropped by 97 percent in 1775, compared with the previous year. Committees of observation and inspection were to be formed in each Colony to ensure compliance with the boycott. It was further agreed that if the Intolerable Acts were not repealed, the colonies would also cease exports to Britain after September 10, 1775.

The Houses of Assembly of each participating colony approved the proceedings of the Congress, with the exception of New York. The boycott was successfully implemented, but its potential for altering British colonial policy was cut off by the outbreak of hostilities in April 1775.

Congress also voted to meet again the following year if their grievances were not addressed satisfactorily. Anticipating that there would be cause to convene a second congress, delegates resolved to send letters of invitation to those colonies that had not joined them in Philadelphia, including Quebec, Saint John's Island (now Prince Edward Island), Nova Scotia, Georgia, East Florida, and West Florida. Of these, only Georgia would ultimately send delegates to the next Congress.

== List of delegates ==
Colony	Name
New Hampshire	Nathaniel Folsom; John Sullivan
Massachusetts Bay	John Adams; (Note: Future U.S. president.) Samuel Adams; Thomas Cushing; Robert Treat Paine
Rhode Island	Stephen Hopkins; Samuel Ward
Connecticut	Silas Deane; Eliphalet Dyer; Roger Sherman
New York	John Alsop; (Note: Appointed by the Committee of Fifty-one of the city and county of New York and authorized by the counties of Albany, Duchess, and Westchester.) Simon Boerum; James Duane; William Floyd; (Note: For Suffolk County.) John Haring; (Note: Appointed by the general meeting of all the committees of Orange County.) John Jay; (Note: Future U.S. Supreme Court chief justice.) Philip Livingston; Isaac Low; (Note: Ultimately became a loyalist.) Henry Wisner
New Jersey	Stephen Crane; John De Hart; James Kinsey; William Livingston; Richard Smith
Pennsylvania	Edward Biddle; John Dickinson; Joseph Galloway; Charles Humphreys; Thomas Mifflin; John Morton; Samuel Rhoads; George Ross
Delaware	Thomas McKean; George Read; Caesar Rodney
Maryland	Samuel Chase; Robert Goldsborough; Thomas Johnson; William Paca; Matthew Tilghman
Virginia	Richard Bland; Benjamin Harrison; Patrick Henry; Richard Henry Lee; Edmund Pendleton; Peyton Randolph; (Note: Served as president of the Congress.) George Washington
North Carolina	Richard Caswell; Joseph Hewes; William Hooper
South Carolina	Christopher Gadsden; Thomas Lynch; Henry Middleton; Edward Rutledge; John Rutledge

== Gallery ==
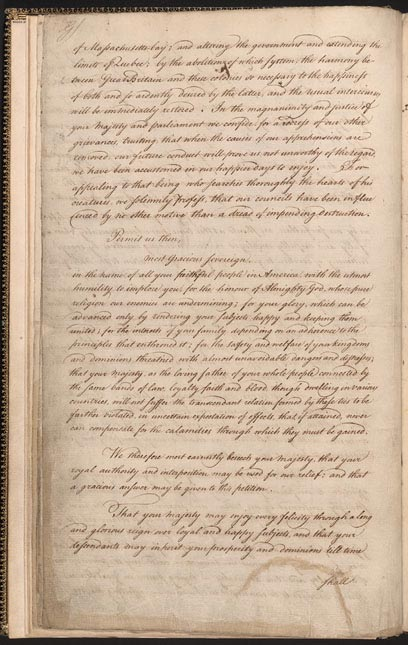
Embossed copy of the Petition to the King

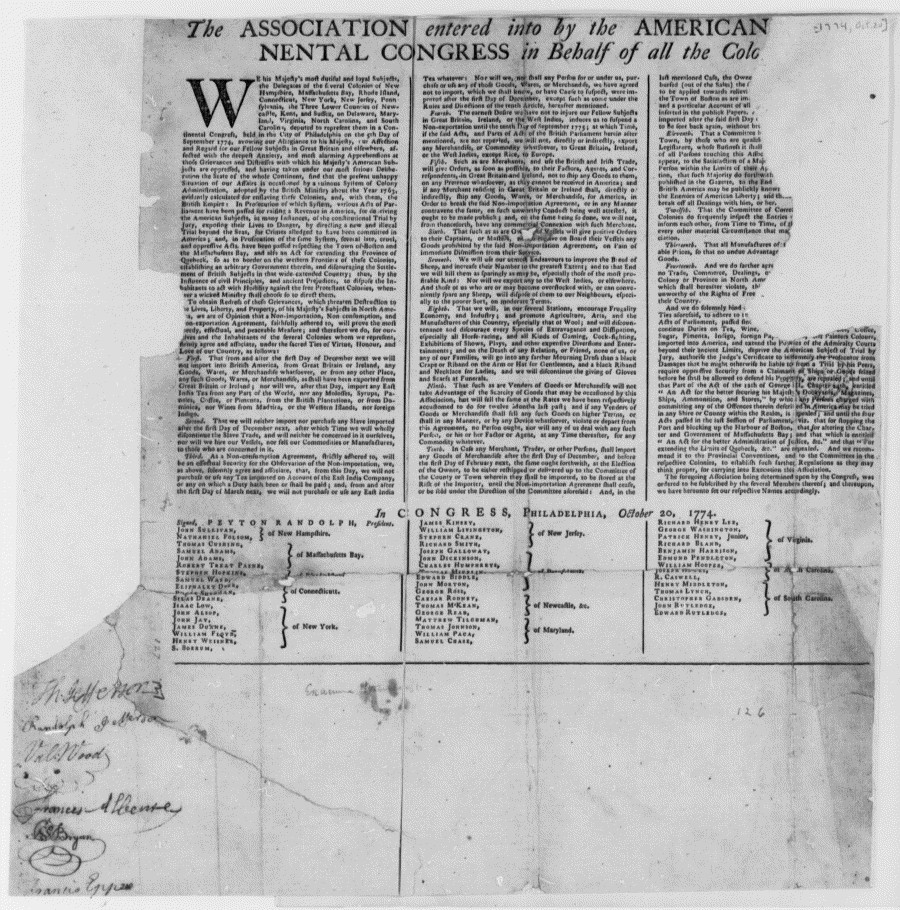
Broadside copy of the Continental Association

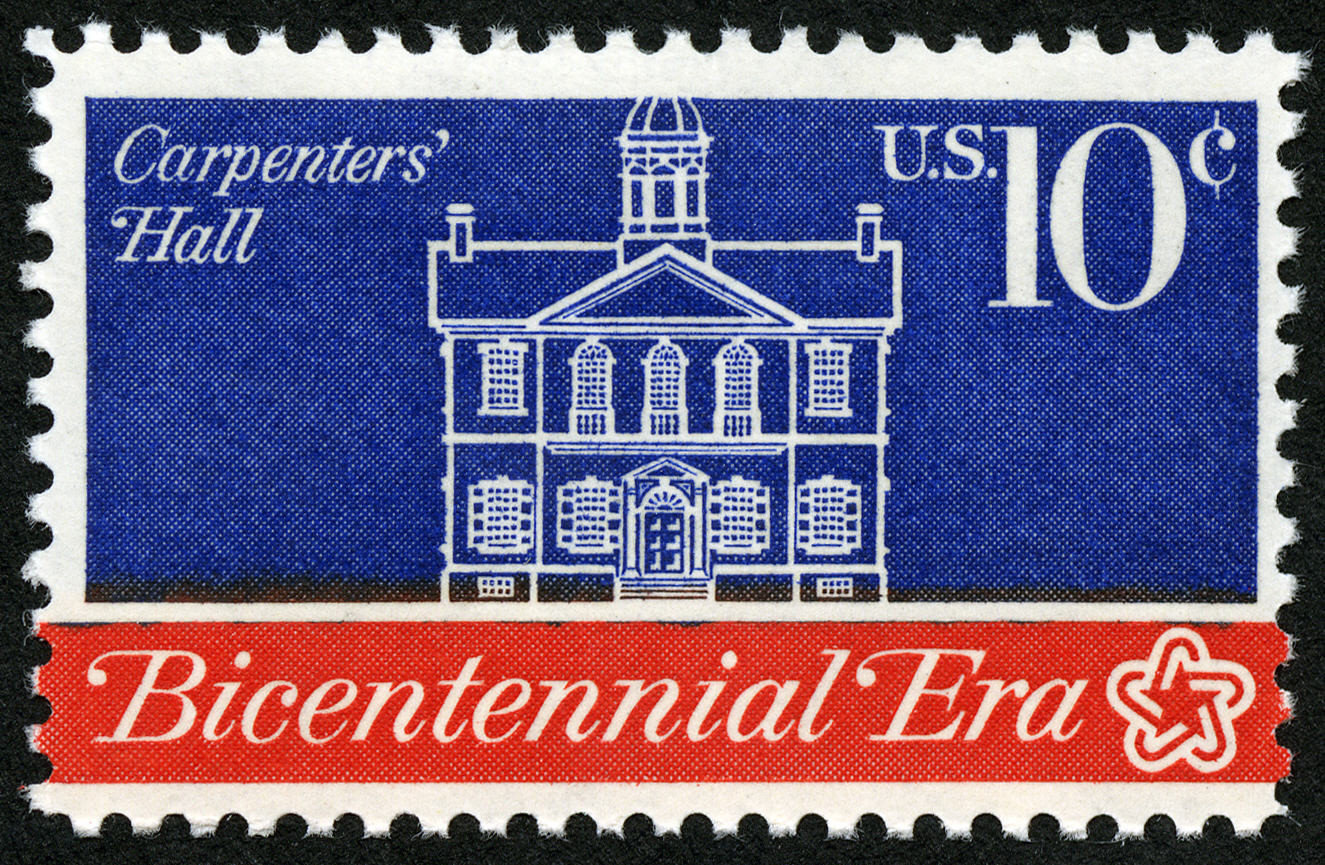

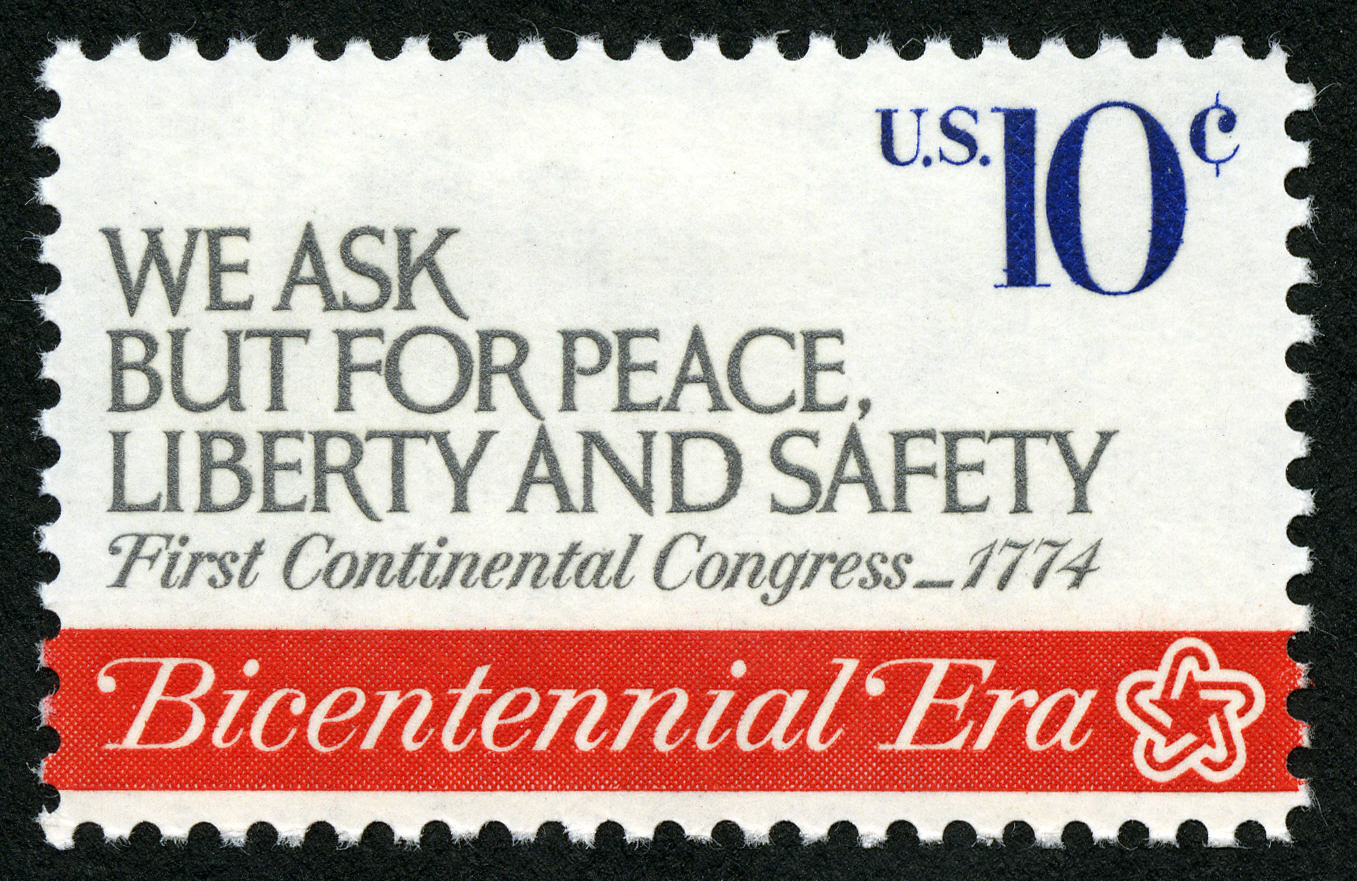

200th anniversary of the First Continental Congress commemorated on two 10-cent U.S. postage stamps of the 1971–1983 Bicentennial Series

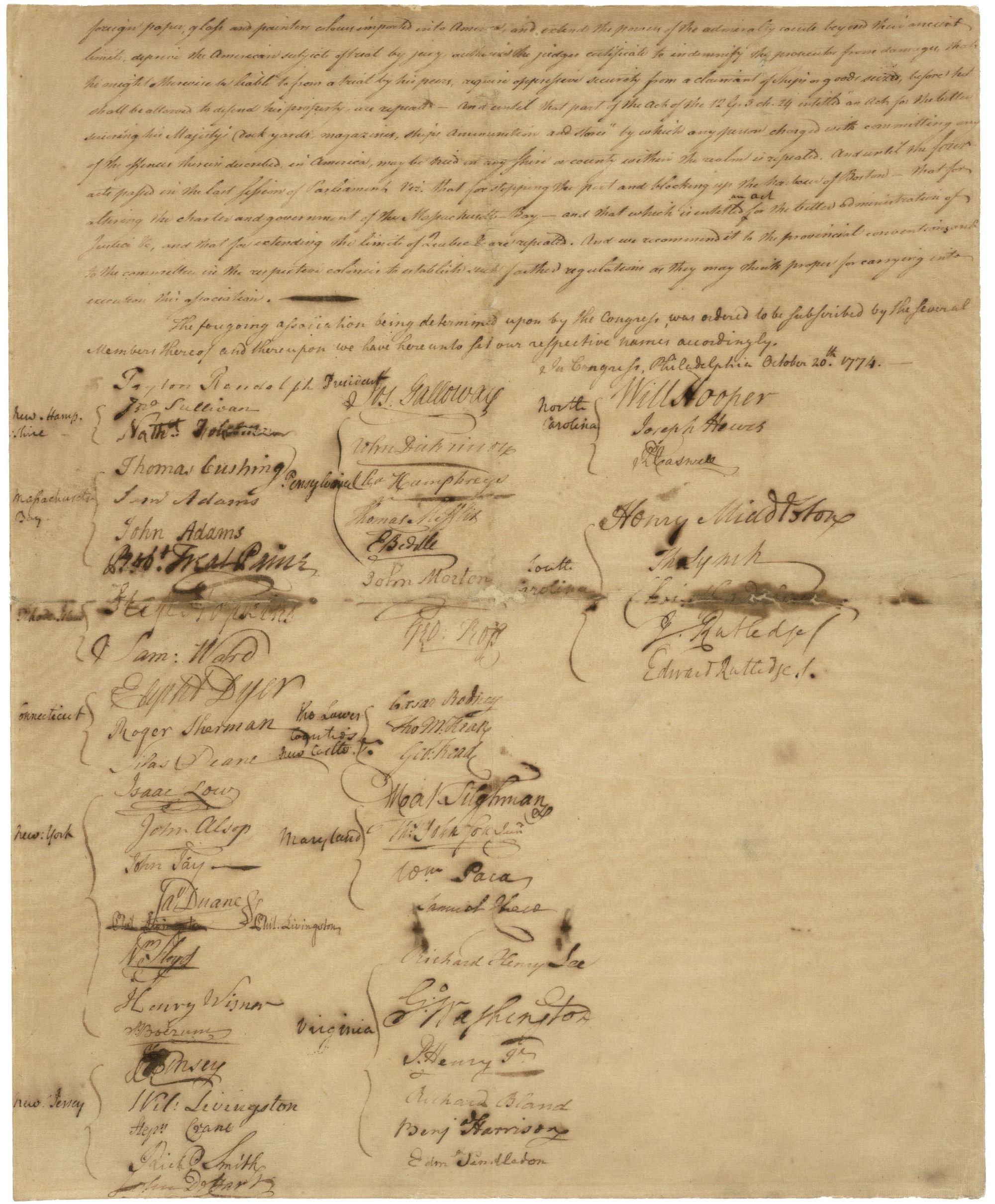
Signatory page of the three-page Continental Association
signed by 53 of the 56 delegates

== See also ==
- American Revolutionary War#Prelude to revolution
- Founding Fathers of the United States
- Journals of the Continental Congress
- List of delegates to the Continental Congress

Preceded by Stamp Act Congress	First Continental Congress; September 5 – October 26, 1774	Succeeded by Second Continental Congress
