= Bicentennial Series =

Series of commemorative postage stamps

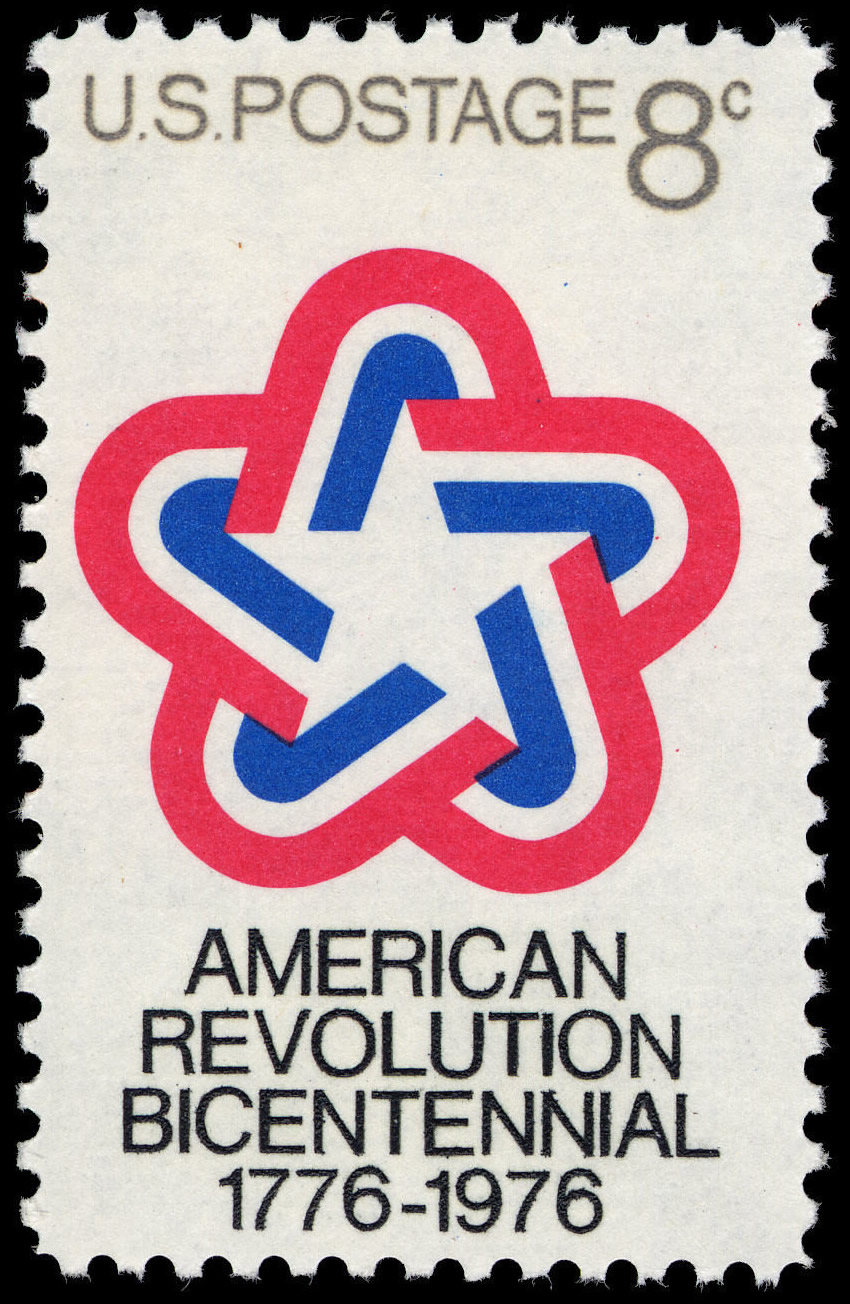
The first stamp in the Bicentennial Series was designed in 1970 by Bruce N. Blackburn.

The Bicentennial Series was a lengthy series of American commemorative postage stamps.

It began with the issuance of a stamp showing the logo for the Bicentennial celebrations on July 4, 1971, and concluded on September 2, 1983, with a stamp for the Treaty of Paris. While many of the stamps showed the Bicentennial logo as a design element or contained the words "US BICENTENNIAL" or "BICENTENNIAL ERA", not all did.

After the initial issue, few other stamps were issued through 1974. An annual issue of four stamps took place (usually on July 4 of each year): in 1972, honoring Colonial craftsmen; in 1973, Colonial communications; in 1974, the First Continental Congress. In addition, a block of four stamps was issued in 1973 for the bicentennial of the Boston Tea Party.

In 1975, with the bicentennial of the start of the Revolutionary War, the series swung into high gear. Four stamps were issued honoring relatively obscure "Contributors to the Cause", of which the best known was Haym Salomon. On July 4, a block of four stamps was issued showing Revolutionary War uniforms, and with the bicentennial of the Battles of Lexington and Concord, the first of a standardized set began—showing a detail from a painting depicting the event commemorated, with the name of the event and year, and US BICENTENNIAL XX Cents (between 10 and 20). This "painting" format continued with an issue for the Battle of Bunker Hill in June.

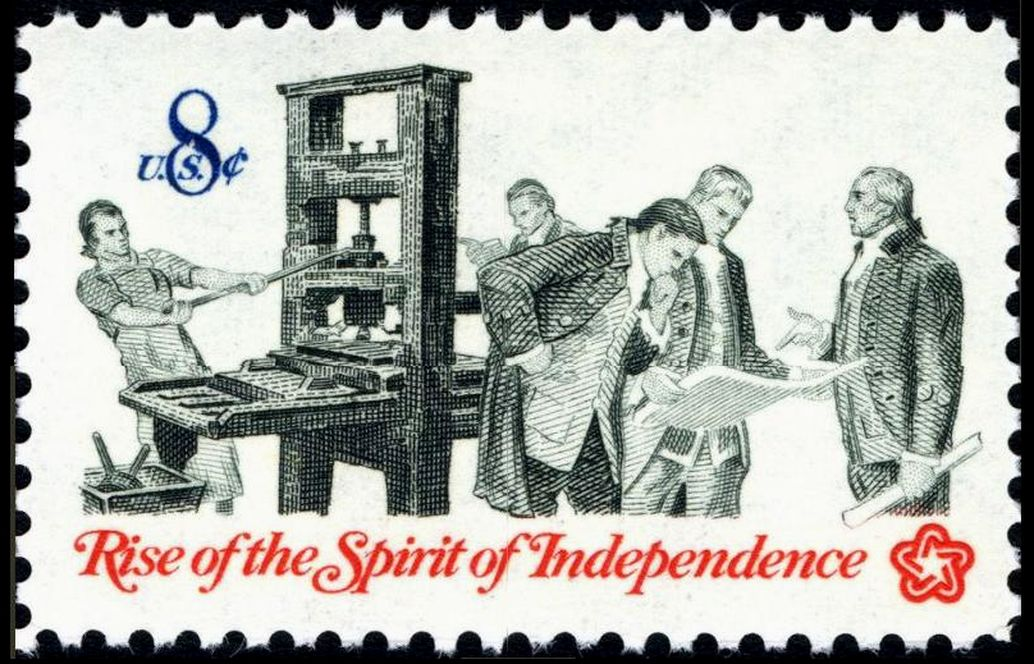
1973 Rise of the Spirit of Independence issue

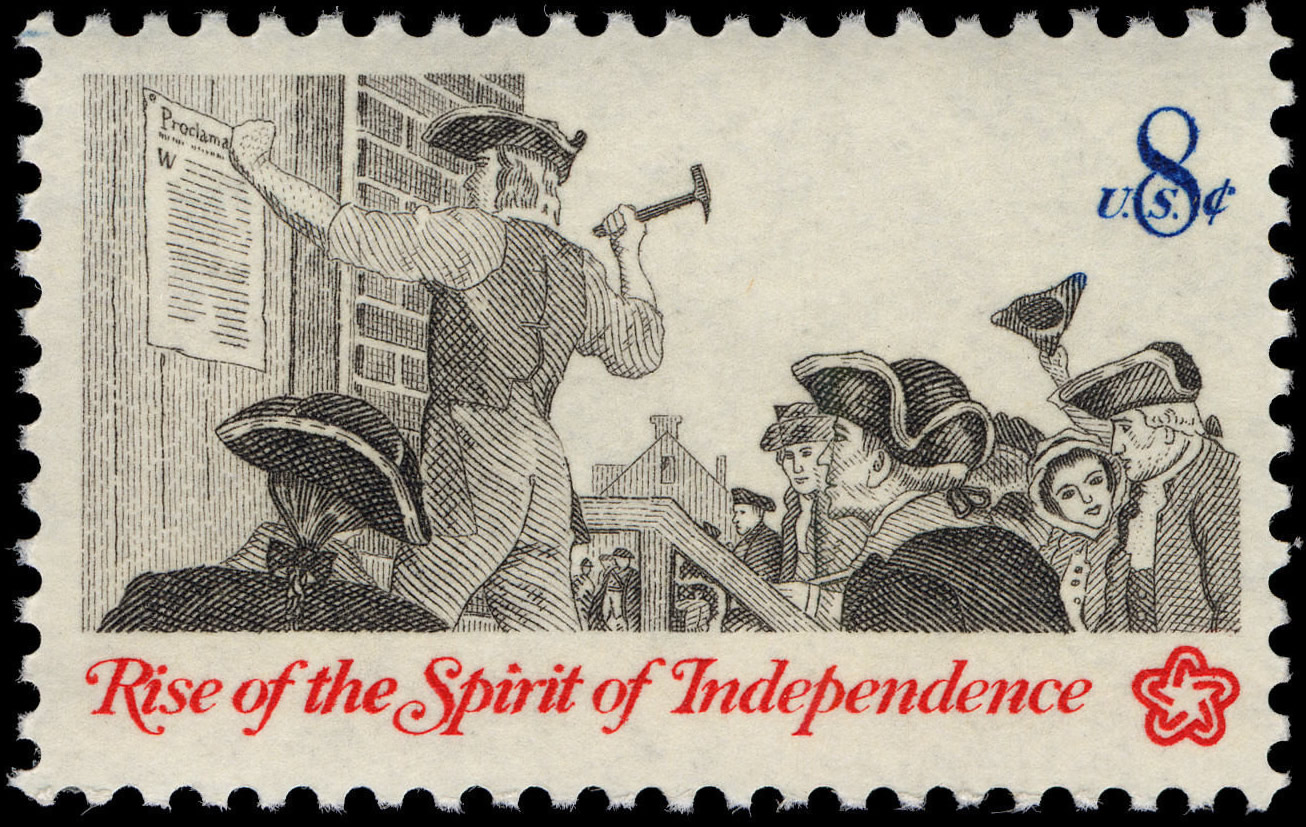
1973 Rise of the Spirit of Independence issue

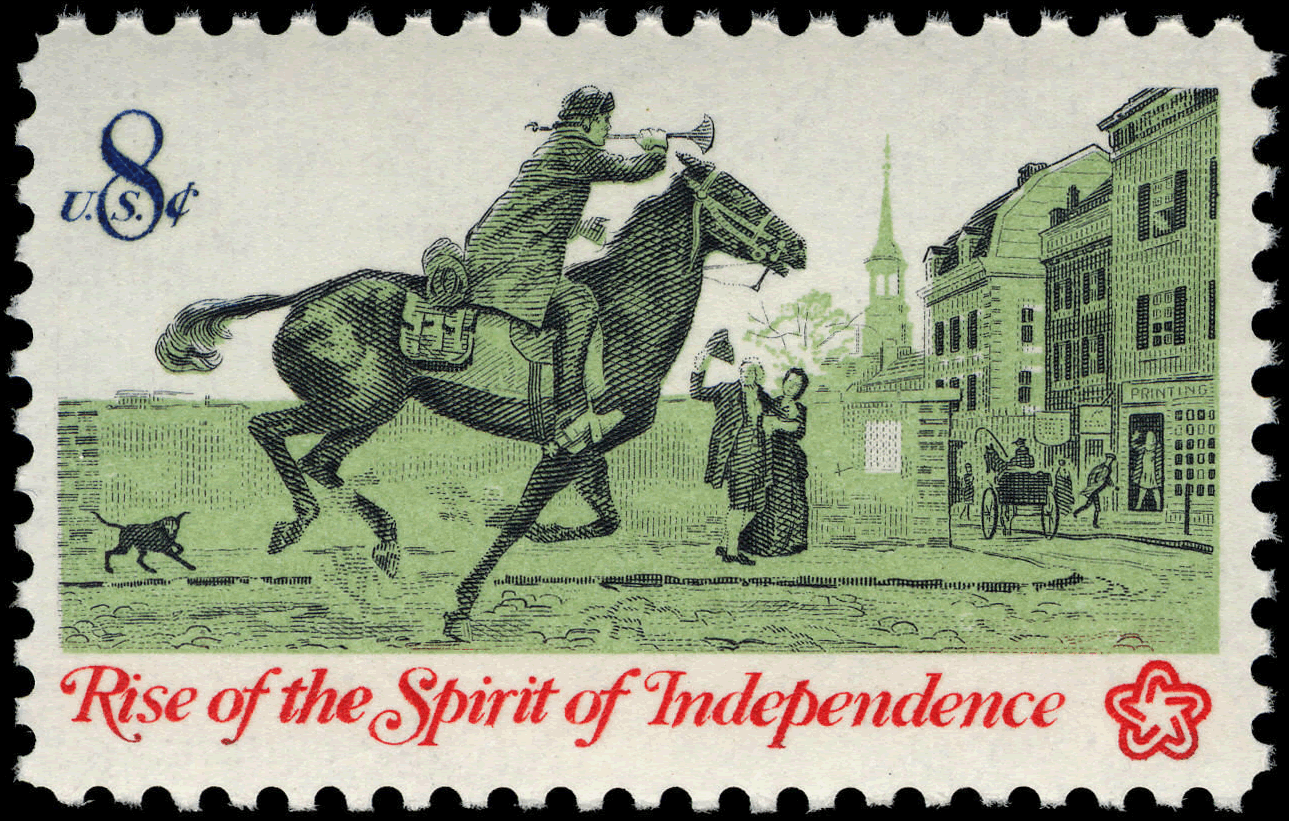
1973 Rise of the Spirit of Independence issue

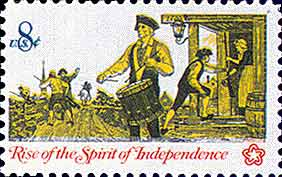
1973 Rise of the Spirit of Independence issue

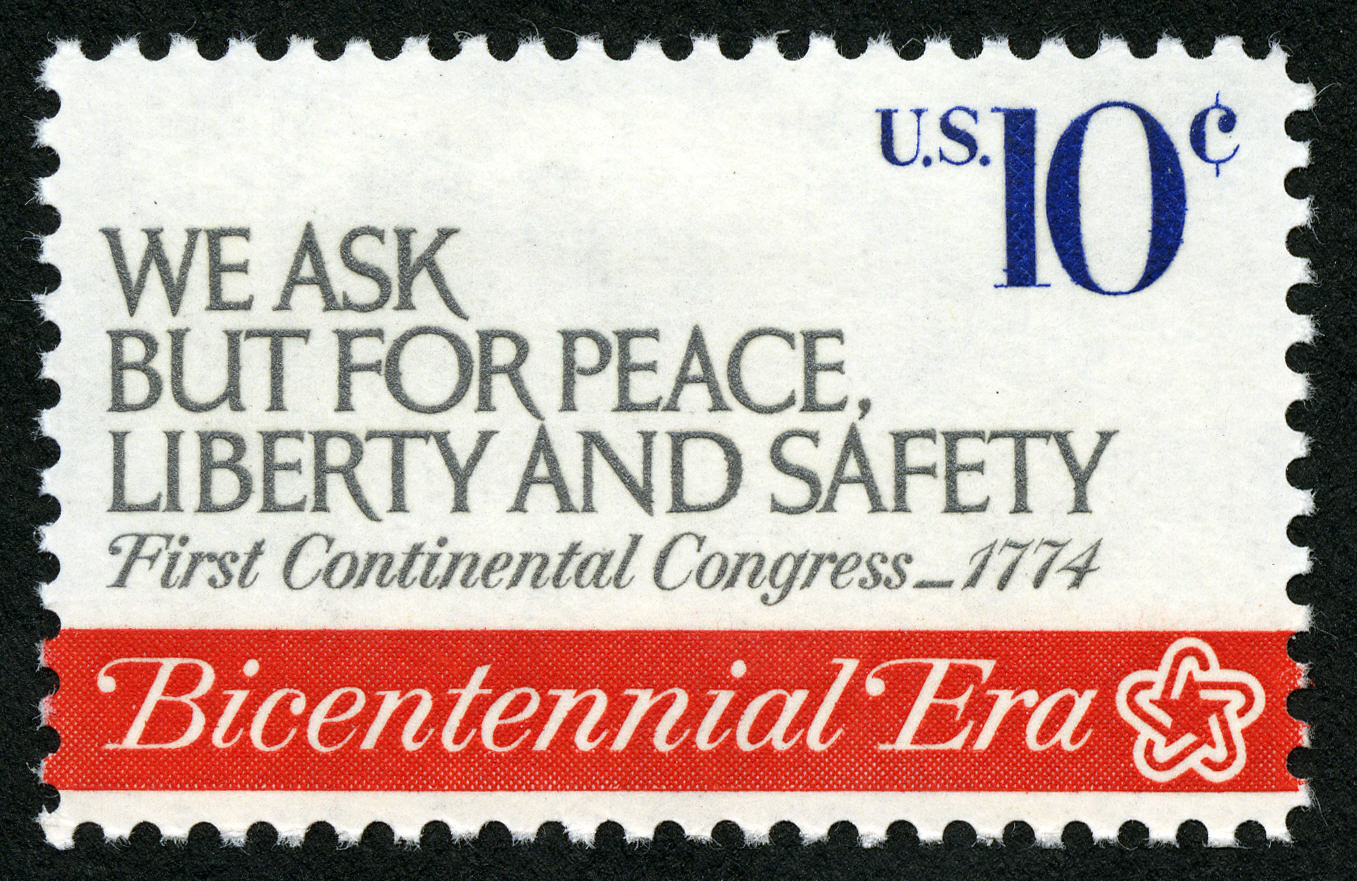
1974 First Continental Congress issue

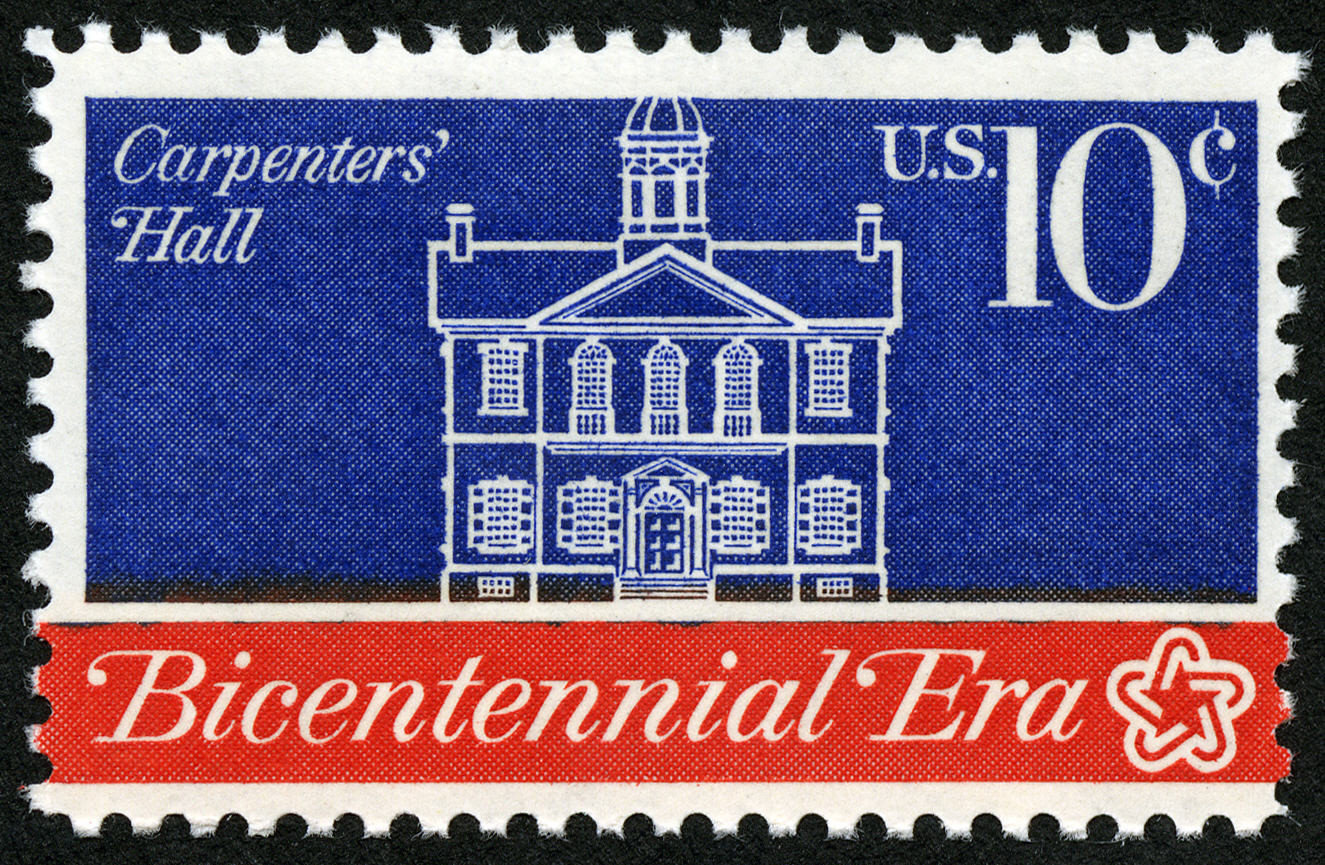
1974 First Continental Congress issue

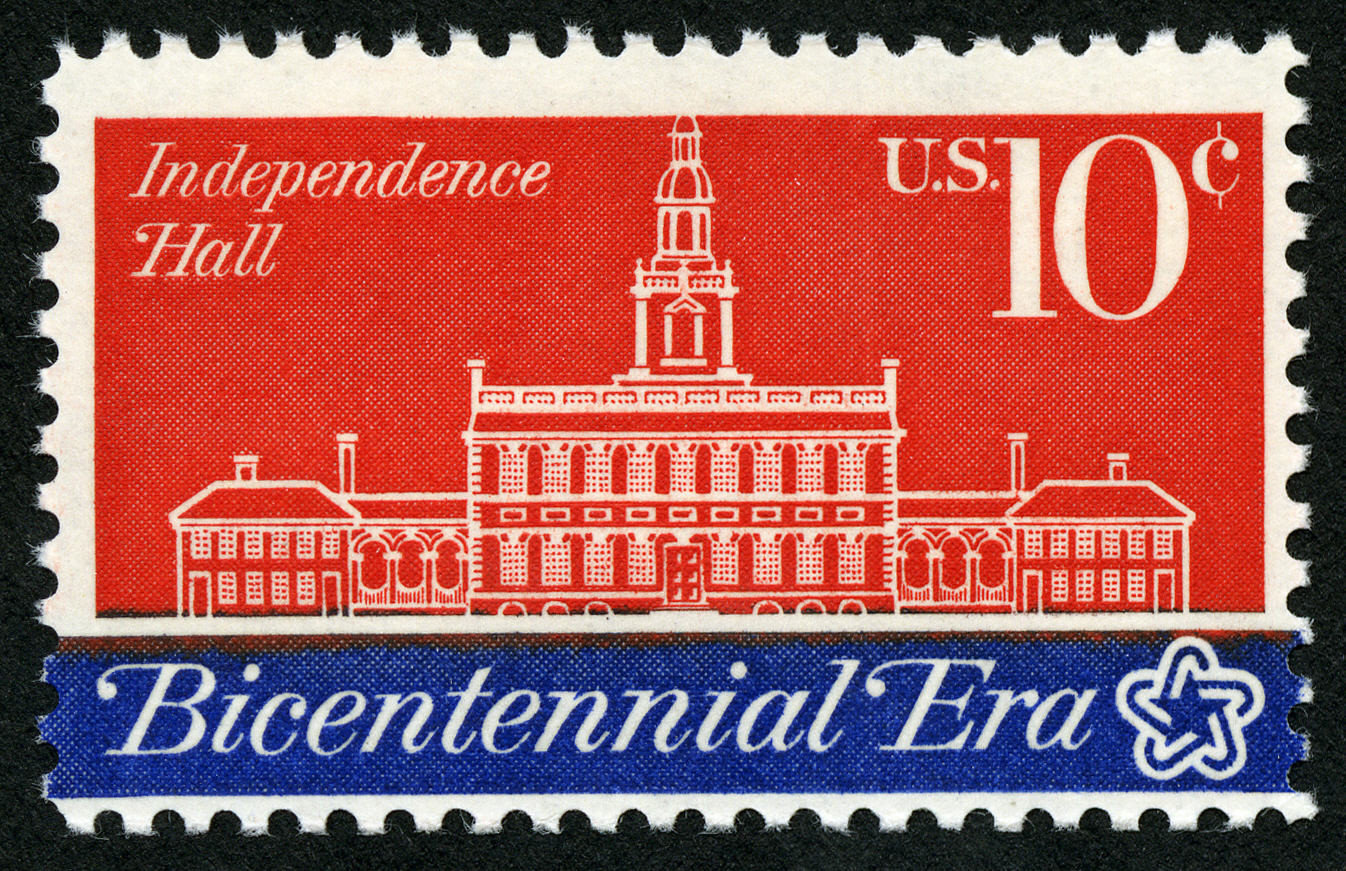
1974 First Continental Congress issue

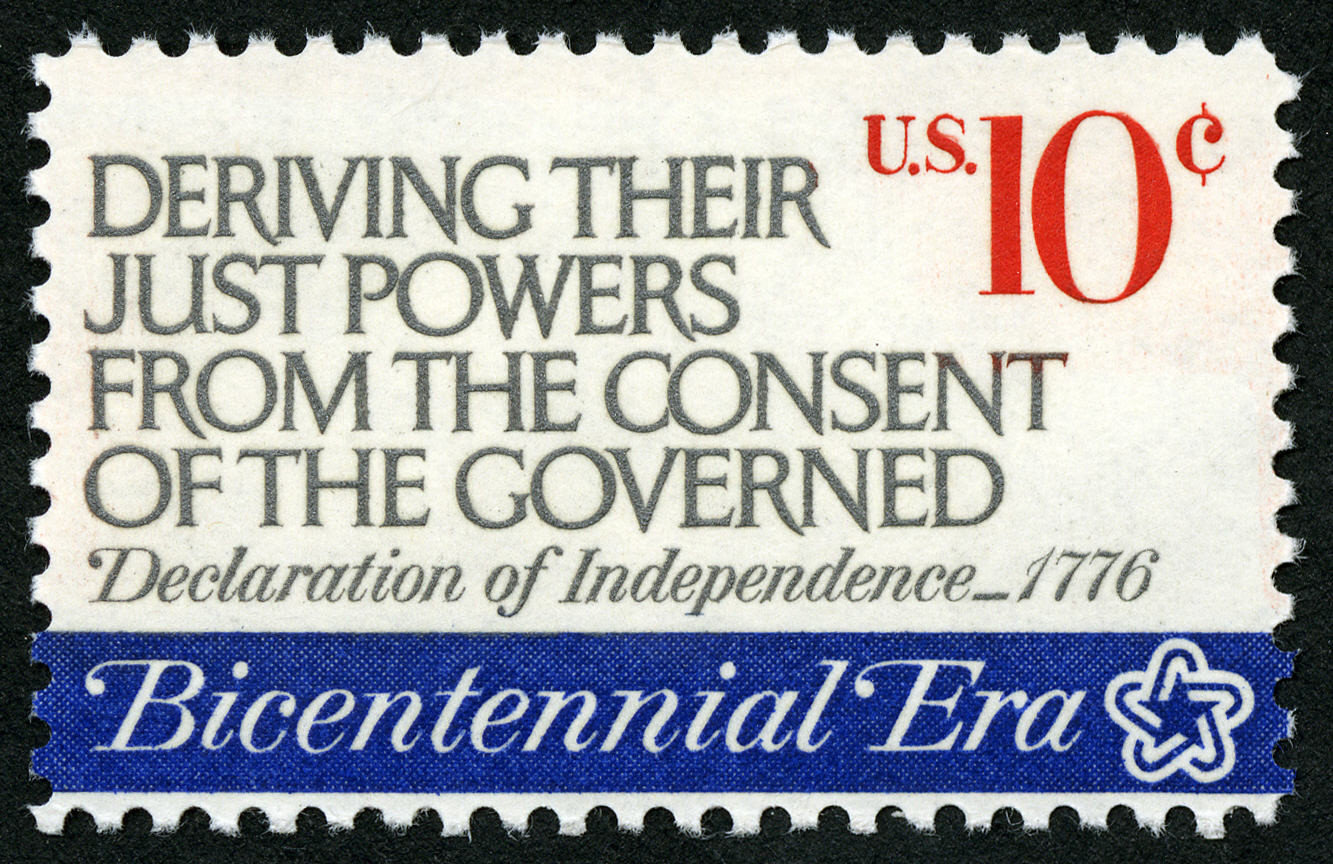
1974 First Continental Congress issue

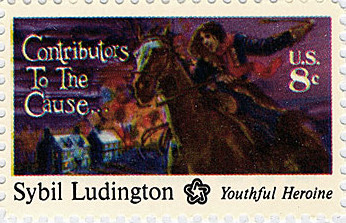
1975 Contributors to the Cause issue

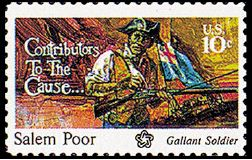
1975 Contributors to the Cause issue

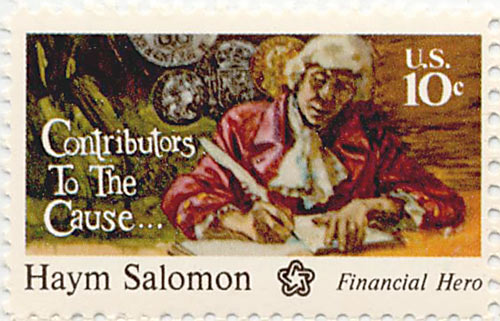
1975 Contributors to the Cause issue

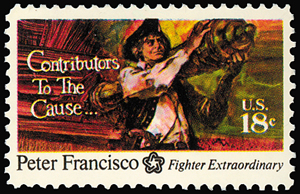
1975 Contributors to the Cause issue

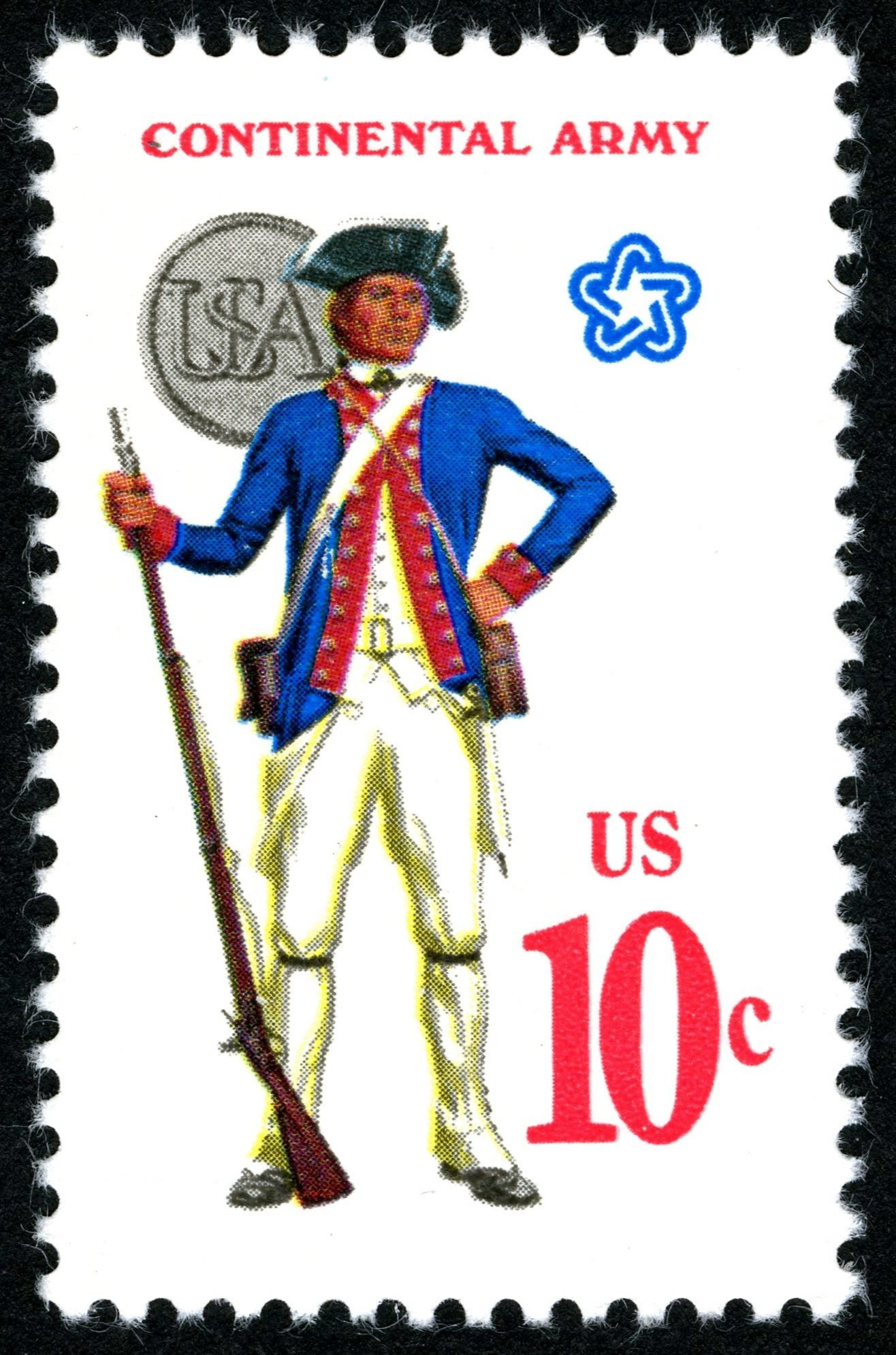
1975 Revolutionary War uniforms issue

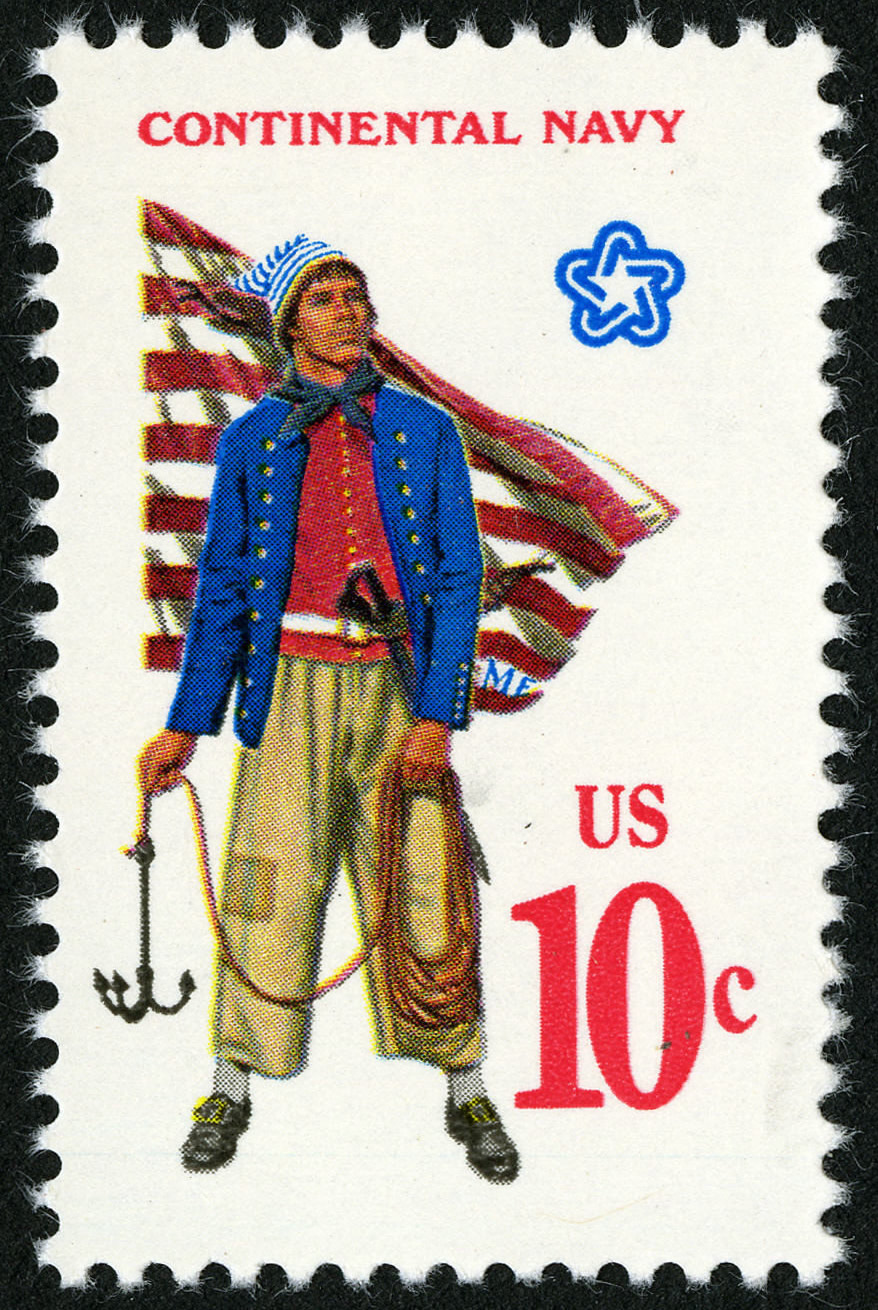
1975 Revolutionary War uniforms issue

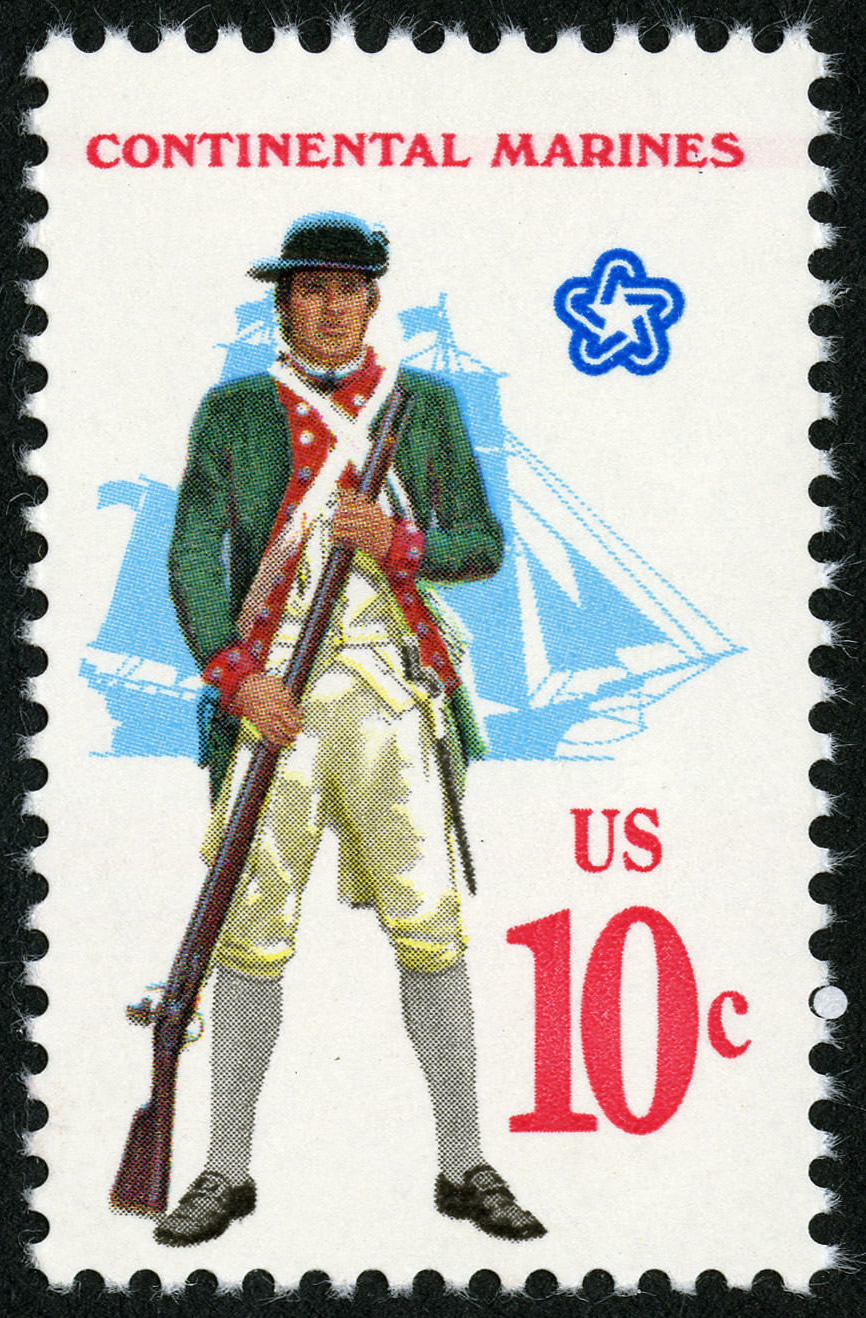
1975 Revolutionary War uniforms issue

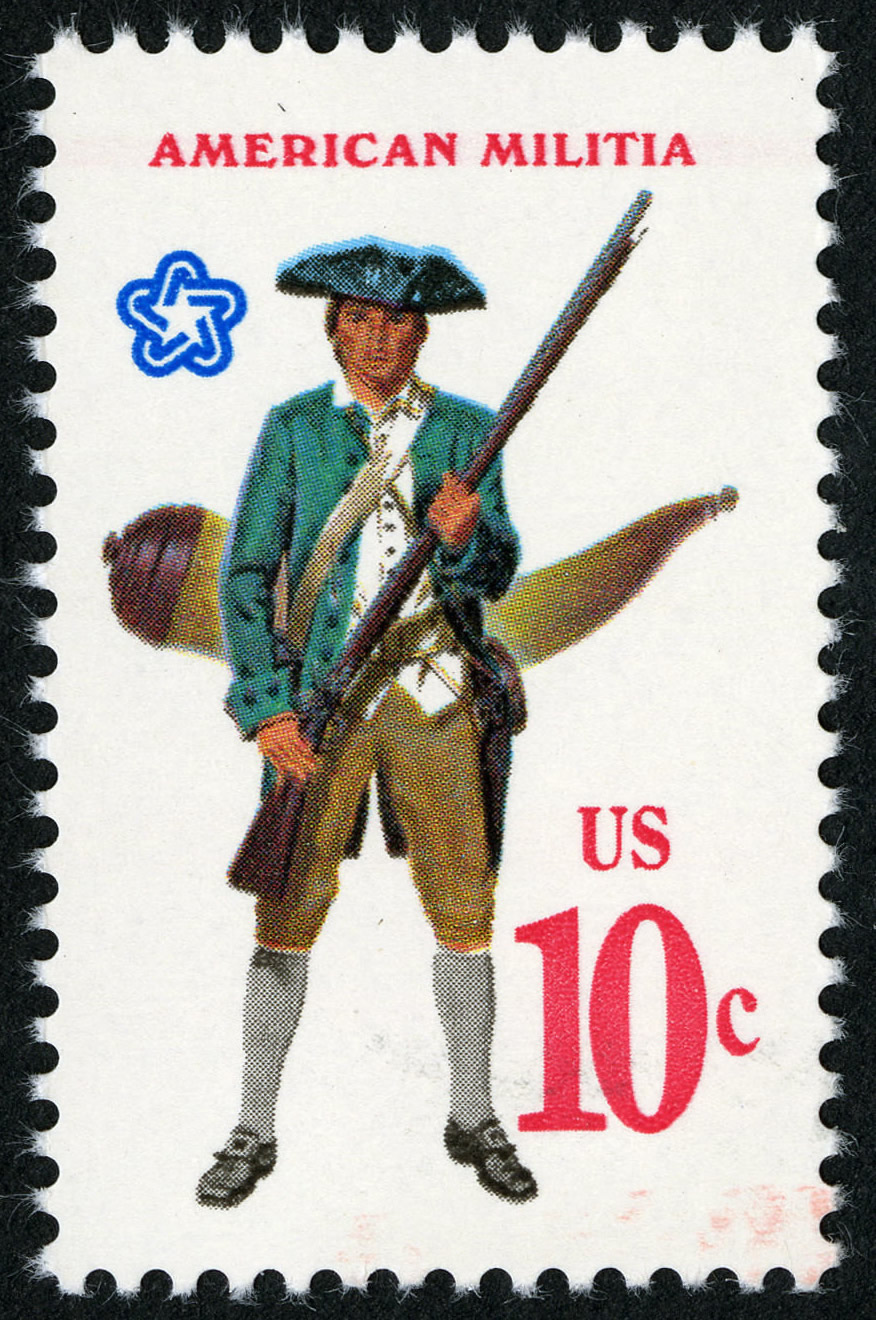
1975 Revolutionary War uniforms issue

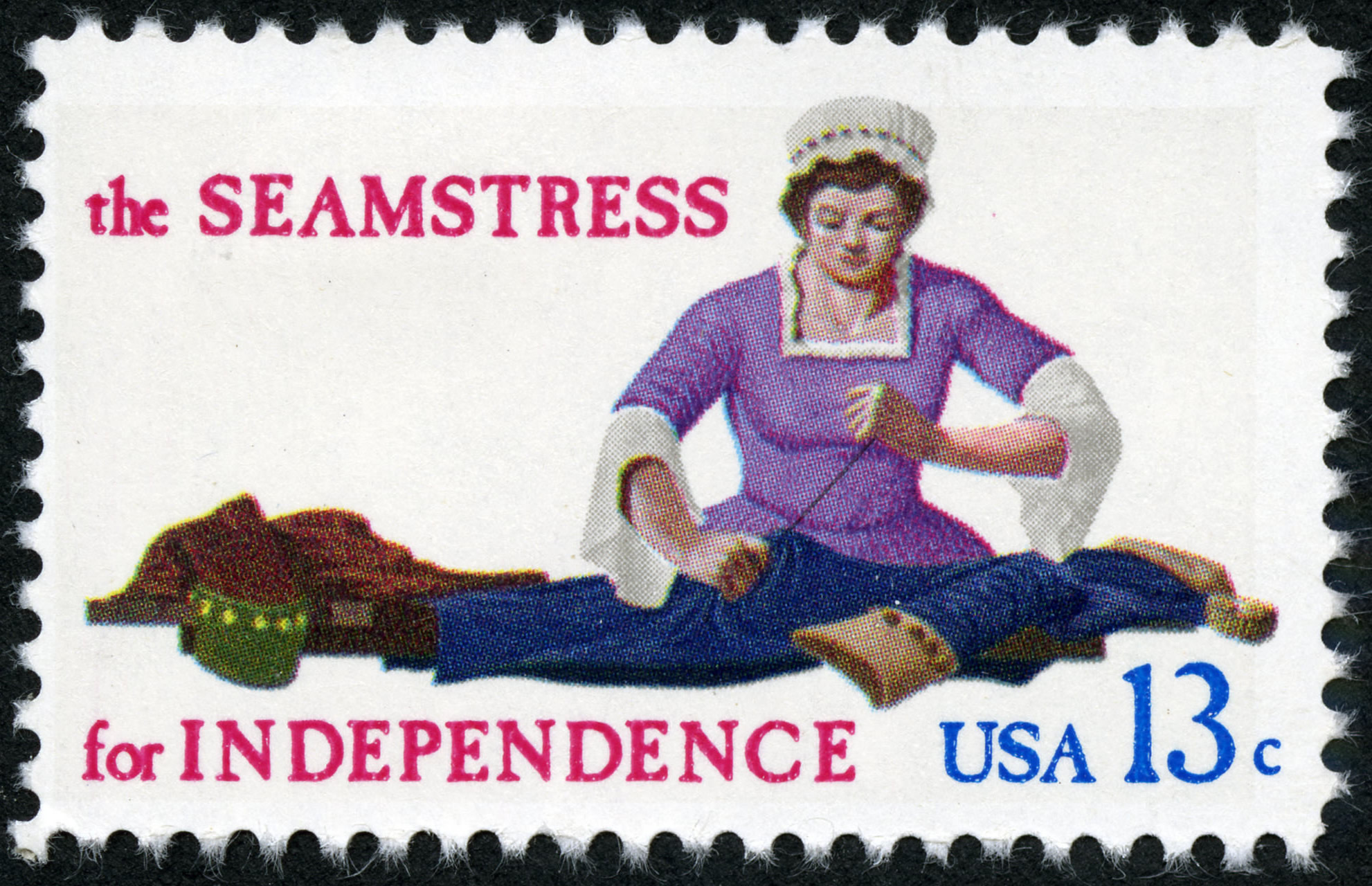
1977 "Skilled Hands for Independence" issue

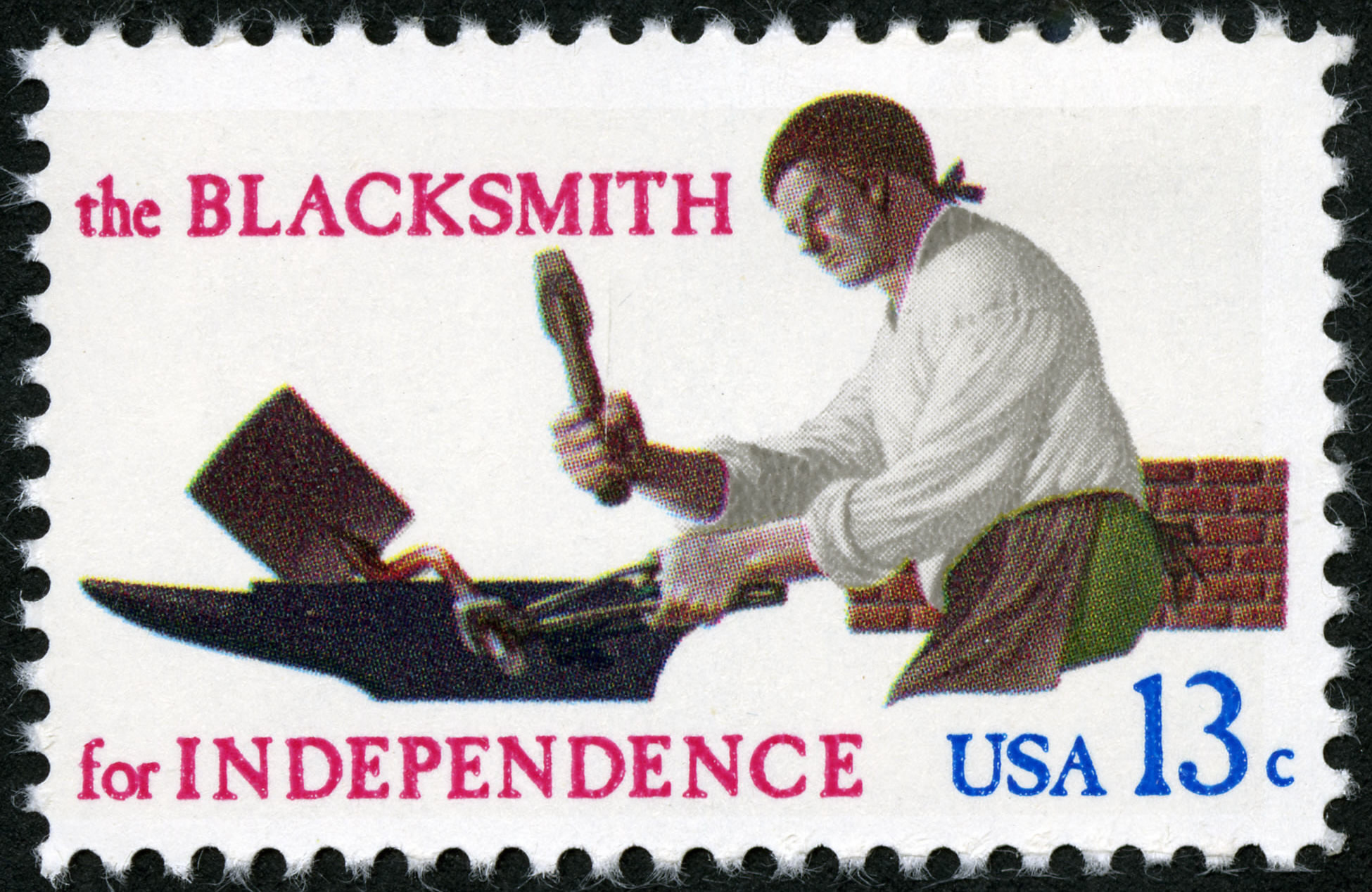
1977 "Skilled Hands for Independence" issue

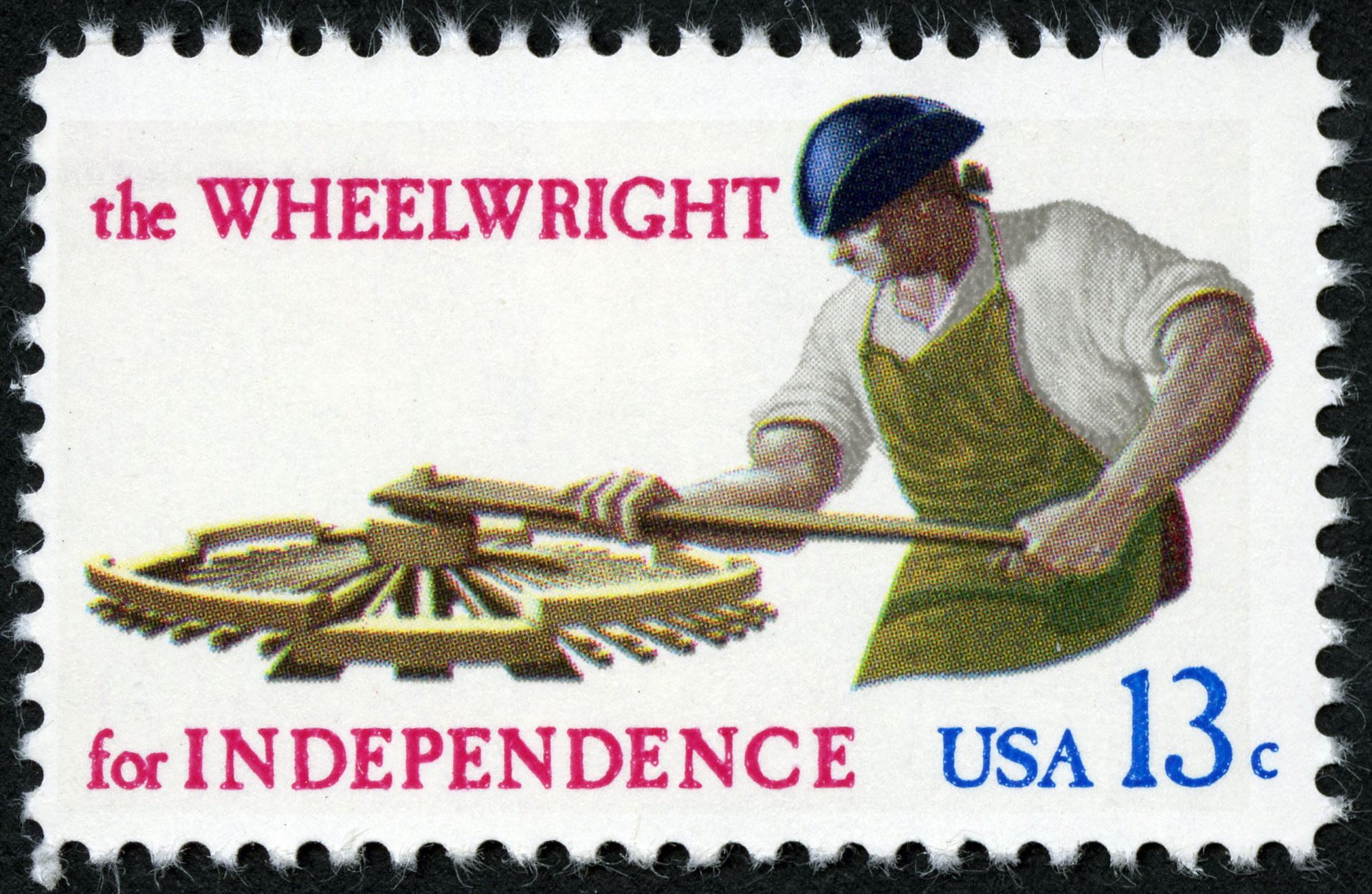
1977 "Skilled Hands for Independence" issue

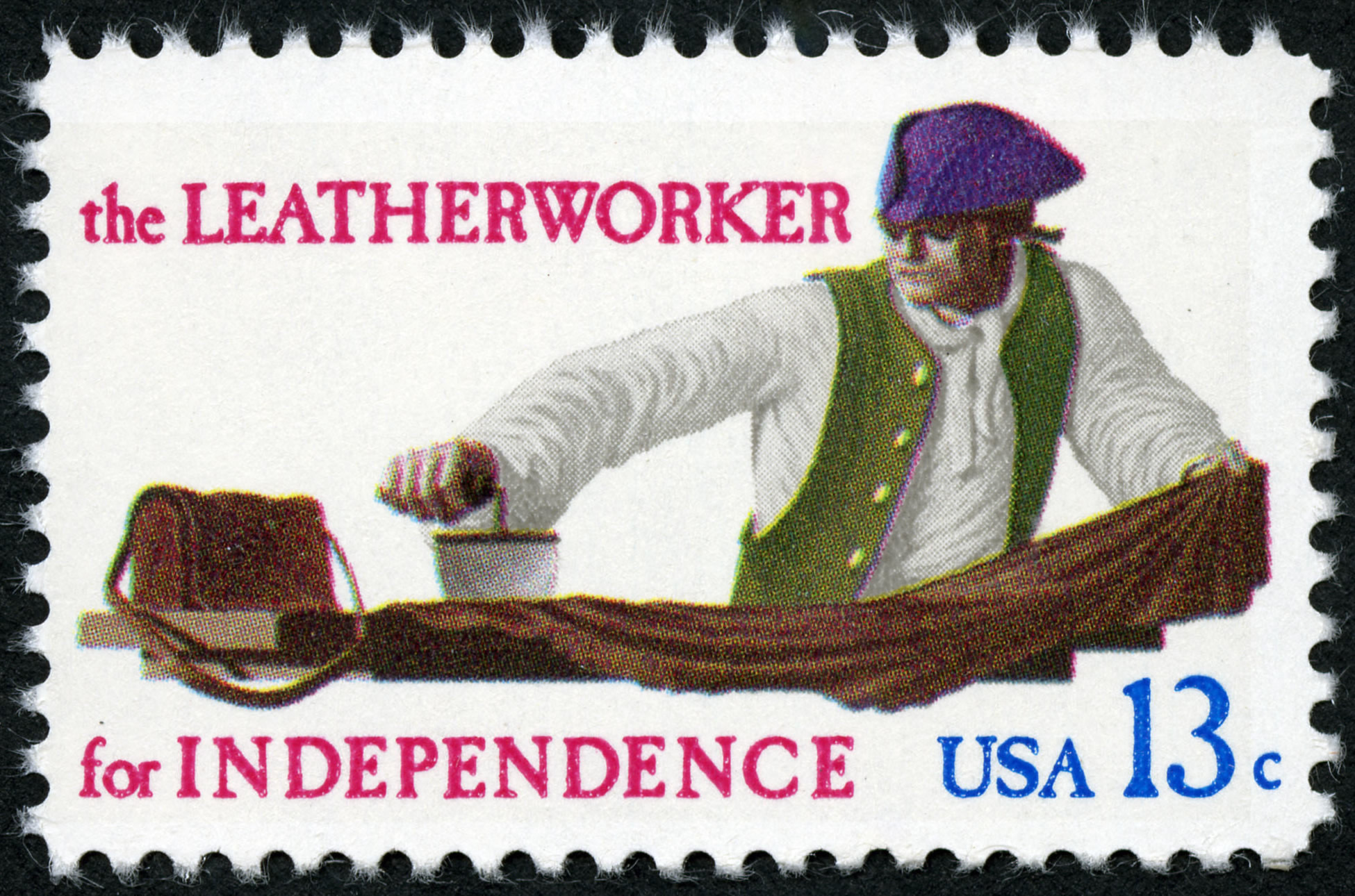
1977 "Skilled Hands for Independence" issue

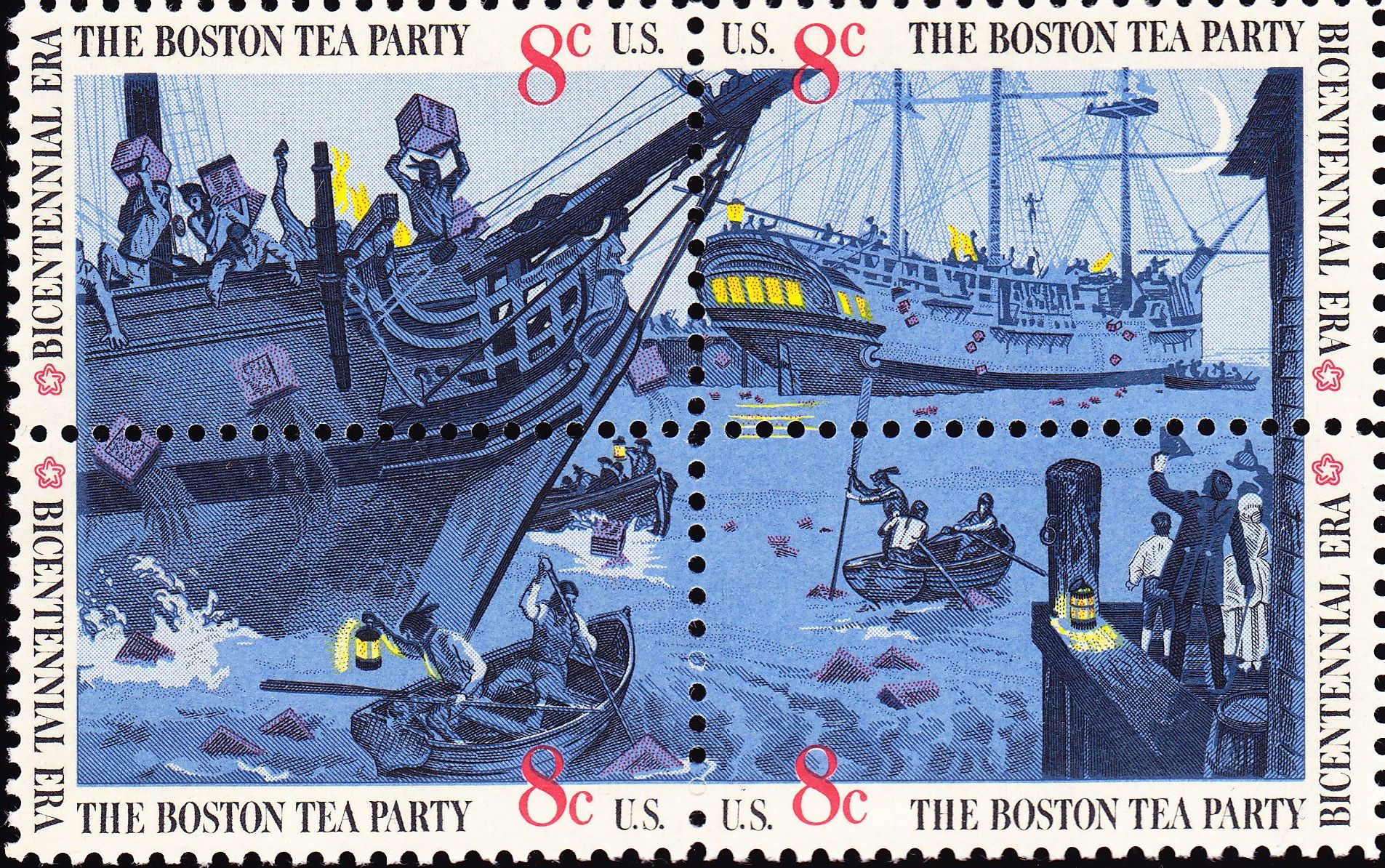
1973 Boston Tea Party issue

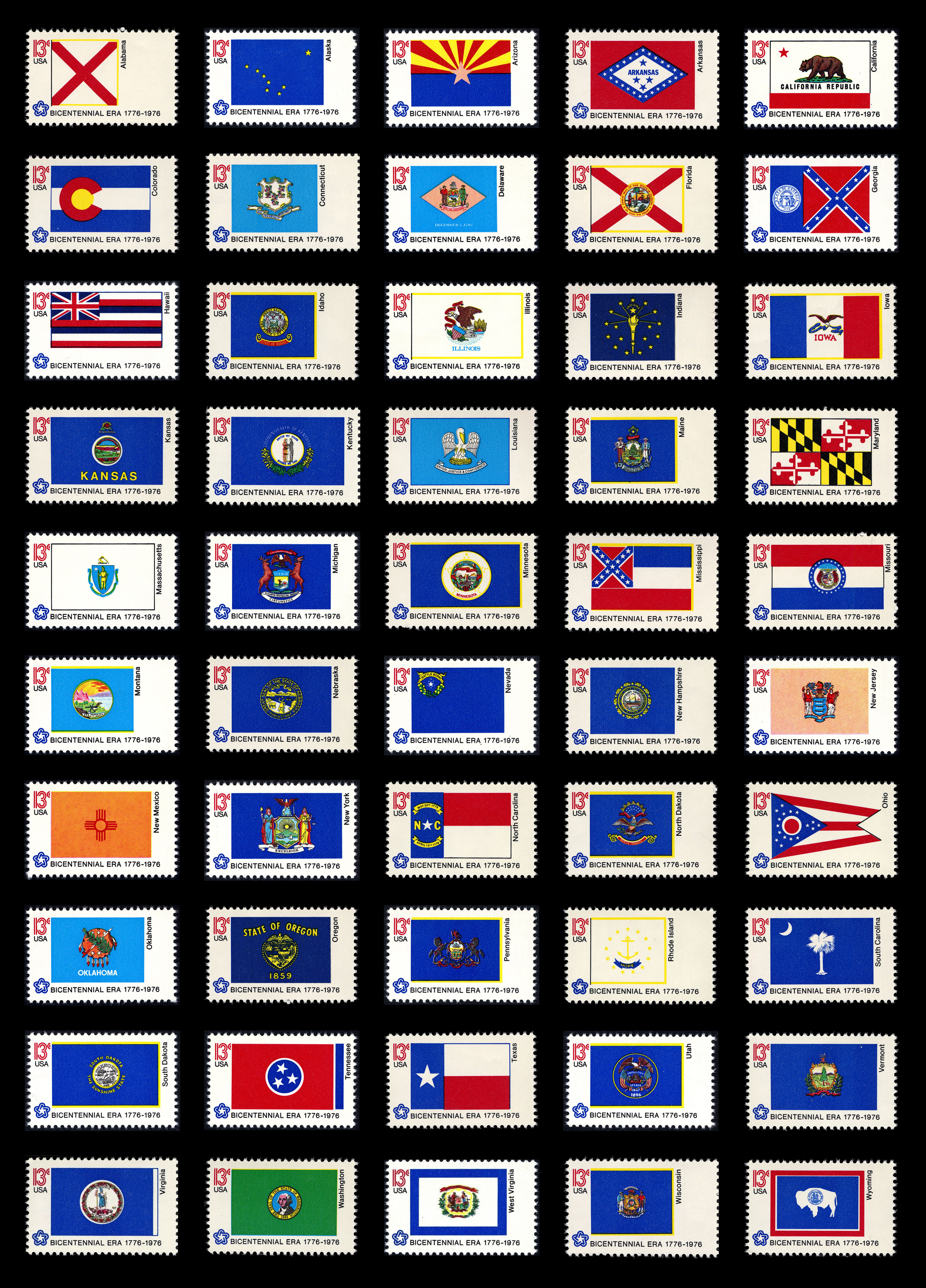
1976 State Flags issue

On January 1, 1976, a set of three stamps (lacking any text related to the Bicentennial other than the words SPIRIT OF 76) was issued, showing the well-known painting. On February 23, a pane of 50 stamps with the State Flags was issued, each stamp containing the Bicentennial logo and the words "BICENTENNIAL ERA 1776-1976". Four souvenir sheets were issued for the INTERPHIL international stamp exhibition in May, showing famous paintings depicting Revolutionary War events. It was followed with a Bicentennial stamp honoring Benjamin Franklin.

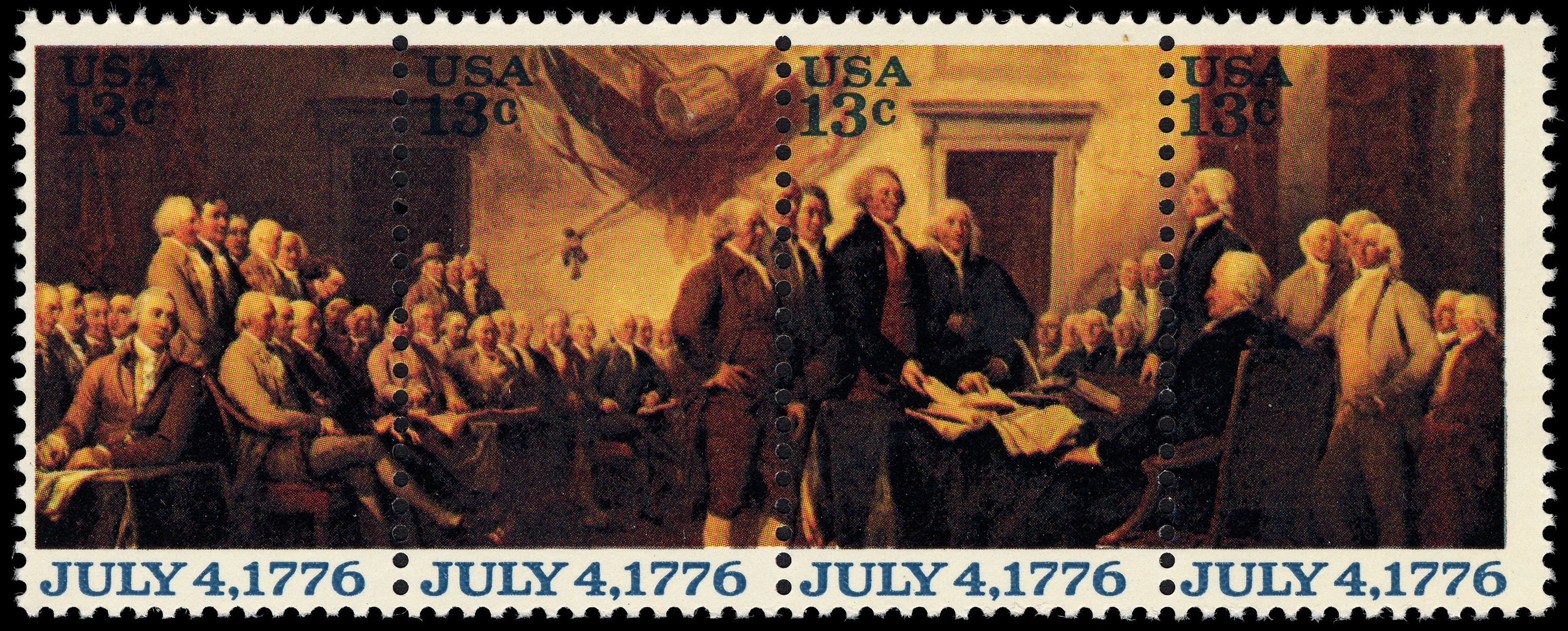
1976 Declaration of Independence issue

Originally, the United States Postal Service had planned to issue another 50-stamp pane, showing the entire Declaration of Independence. Plans were shelved after the American Philatelic Society threatened the USPS with a "black blot" for excessive stamp issuance. Instead, a strip of four stamps showing part of the John Trumbull painting showing the presentation of the Declaration (often believed to show its signing) was issued on July 4 (parts of Trumbull paintings were used for the issues for Bunker Hill and Saratoga, as well).

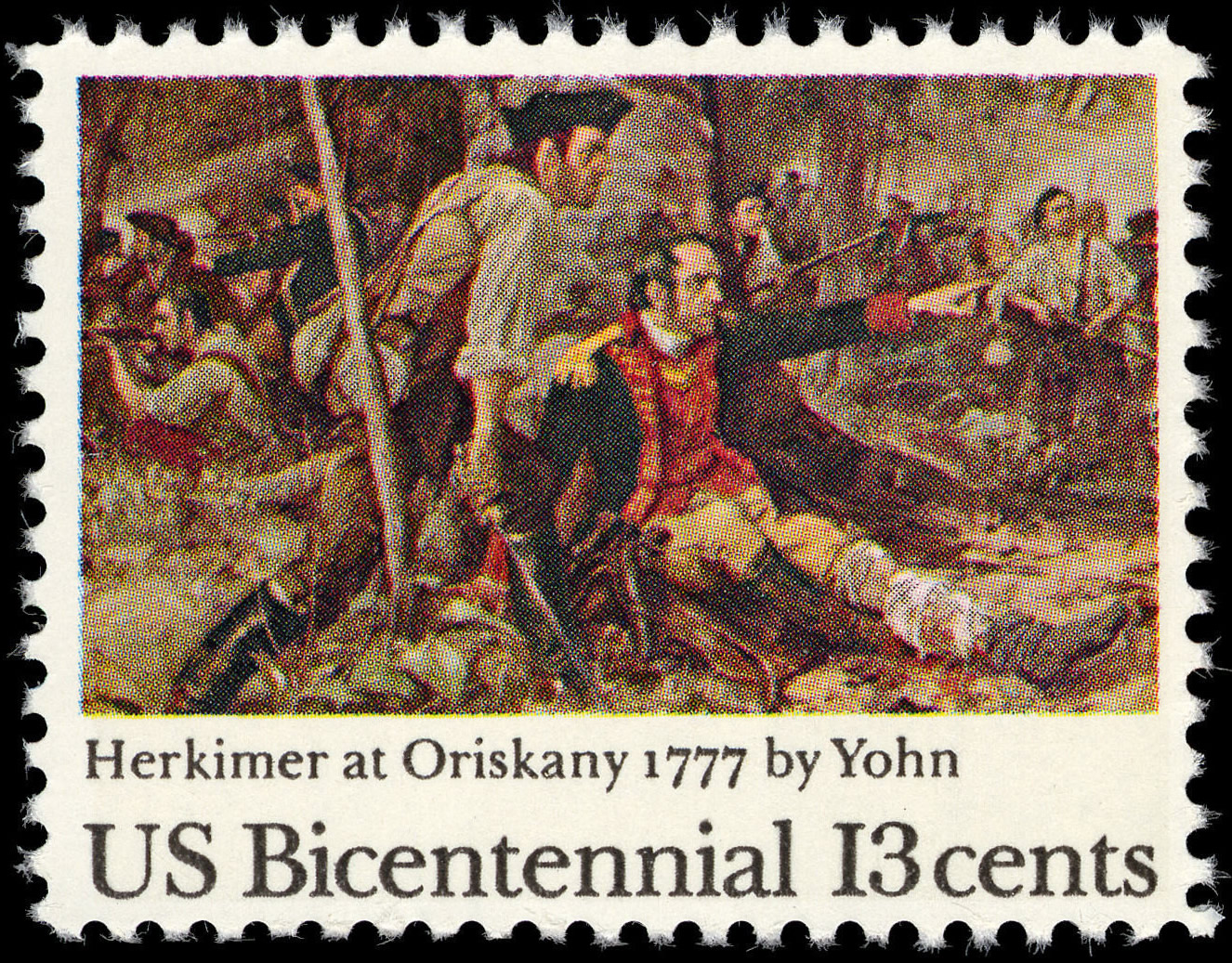
1977 postage stamp commemorating the Battle of Oriskany

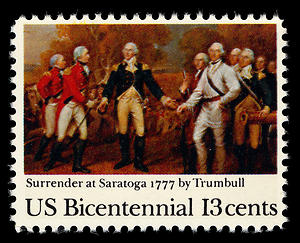
1977 postage stamp commemorating the surrender at Saratoga

A painting-format stamp was issued January 3, 1977 for Washington's successful battle at Princeton. Similarly painting stamps were issued to commemorate the Battle of Oriskany and the Battle of Saratoga. Four stamps were issued on July 4 to honor craftsmen with the legend "Skilled Hands for Independence". Additional stamps honored the Articles of Confederation and the arrival of Lafayette. One of the Christmas stamps that year, though not formally part of the series, showed Washington kneeling at Valley Forge.

By 1978, not only was the nation losing interest in the Bicentennial, but most of the events familiar to citizens from school history books had already had their bicentennials pass. Only a single stamp, noting the French Alliance, was issued that year. One Bicentennial stamp was issued in 1979, depicting John Paul Jones. The next stamp issue would not occur until 1981, when two stamps marked the Battle of Yorktown. The final stamp in the series, noting the Treaty of Paris in the painting format, was issued in 1983.

A number of items of postal stationery were issued. Notably, the USPS found issuance of postal stationery a convenient way of marking the bicentennial of some of the more obscure, but important battles of the war (such as 1781's Battle of Cowpens) without the need to issue a stamp. Instead, a postal card was issued.

A number of other issues, while not part of the series themselves, had Bicentennial themes. The standard definitive postal card, throughout the Bicentennial Era, honored figures of that time such as John Hancock and Charles Thomson. The 7.7 cent coil stamp for bulk rate issued in 1976 contains the inscription "Beat the Drum for Liberty and the Spirit of 76" (it depicts a drum). Envelopes, cards, and aerogrammes all had Bicentennial themes.
