= Thomas Lynch Jr. =

Founding Father, signed U.S. Declaration of Independence (1749–1779)

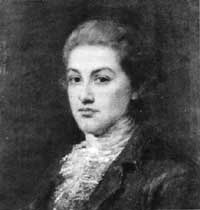
- Born: August 5, 1749; Georgetown, South Carolina, British America
- Disappeared: December 17, 1779; Atlantic Ocean
- Occupation: Planter
- Known for: Signing the Declaration of Independence
- Spouse: Elizabeth Shubrick

Thomas Lynch Jr. (August 5, 1749 – December 17, 1779) was a signer of the United States Declaration of Independence as a representative of South Carolina and a Founding Father of the United States. His father Thomas Lynch was a member of the Continental Congress and had signed the 1774 Continental Association. When he had to step down because of illness, Thomas Lynch Jr. was selected to fill his post.

== Early life ==
The coat of arms of Thomas Lynch Jr.

Lynch Jr. was born at Hopsewee Plantation in Prince George Parish, Winyah, in what is now Georgetown, South Carolina. He was the third child and first son of Thomas Lynch and his wife, Elizabeth (née Allston) Lynch. He had two older sisters, named Sabina and Esther, who were born in 1747 and 1748, respectively.

Their mother was the daughter of William Allston and his wife, Esther LaBrosse de Marboeuf.

Thomas Lynch was introduce to Elizabeth Allston during a ball held at the childhood home of John Drayton Sr., Magnolia Plantation and Gardens in Charleston, South Carolina. Also in attendance were prominent families such as the Middletons, Randolphs, and Rutledges.

Lynch's grandfather was Jonas Lynch from the County Galway ancestral line. The Lynch family were expelled from Ireland following their defeat in the Irish wars of William of Orange.

Lynch Sr. had emigrated from Kent, England, to South Carolina. He served as a prominent figure in South Carolina politics, which contributed to his descendants' access to higher education and wealth.

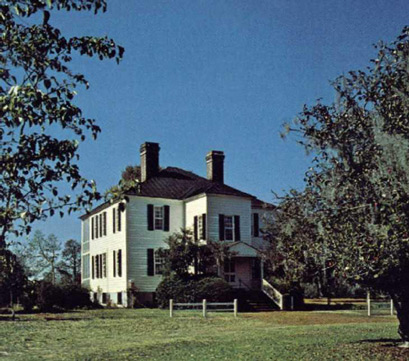
Hopsewee Plantation

=== Education ===
Lynch Jr. was schooled at the Indigo Society School in Georgetown, South Carolina. His parents sent him to England for higher studies. He received honors at Eton College and at Gonville and Caius College, Cambridge.

Lynch Jr. studied law and political philosophy at the Middle Temple in London. His father admired English education and encouraged him to remain in Great Britain to study law and the principles of the British constitution.

After eight years away from North America, Lynch Jr. returned to South Carolina in 1772. Although his father had dreamed of his being in law, Lynch Jr. decided to end his pursuit of that profession.

=== Marriage and family ===
Lynch Jr. married Elizabeth Shubrick on May 14, 1772.

Following their marriage, the couple lived at Peach Tree Plantation, which was located near his homeland plantation. He enjoyed managing the cultivation of crops at the plantation, which was dependent on the labor of numerous enslaved African Americans. Lynch Jr. remained active in political affairs in his community.

His father died from a stroke in December 1776. His widowed mother later married South Carolina Governor William Moultrie, another influential political figure.

His sister Sabina Hope Lynch married James Hamilton, also of the planter class. One of their sons was James Hamilton Jr., who was elected as governor of South Carolina in 1830.

== Career ==
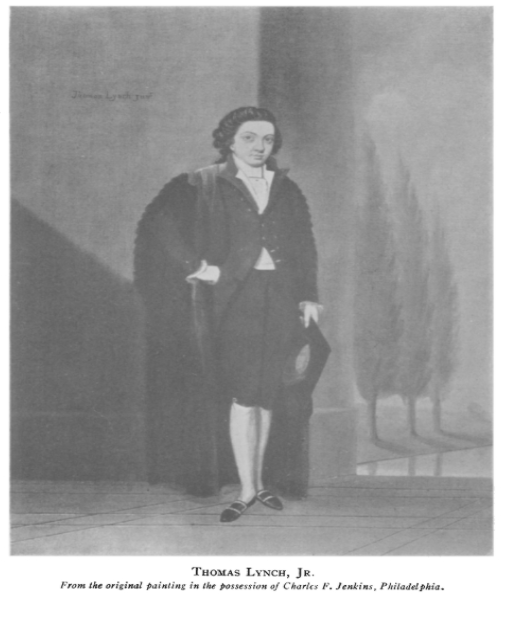
Portrait of Lynch

Lynch was elected a member of the Provincial Congress on February 11, 1775. This committee was formed to prepare a plan of government and represent the people of South Carolina. Lynch served alongside Charles Cotesworth Pinckney, John Rutledge, Charles Pinckney, Henry Laurens, Christopher Gadsden, Rawlins Lowndes, Arthur Middleton, Henry Middleton, Thomas Bee, and Thomas Heyward Jr. in the Provincial Congress. The group formed the South Carolina constitution. Many people objected to the document. including the Continental Congress. It stood as a temporary constitution, as many believed there would be reconciliation with Great Britain.

Lynch became a company commander in the First South Carolina regiment on June 12, 1775. He was commissioned by the Provincial Congress. After being appointed, he gathered men and led a march into Charlestown, South Carolina. Amid the march, he became very sick with a bilious fever which prevented him from continuing. When he recovered, he was unable to fulfill his position. During his recovery, he received news about his father's declining health. In the hope that he could manage his father's illness, Lynch asked his commanding officer, Colonel Christopher Gadsden, if he could travel to Philadelphia. His request was denied at first, but after receiving news of his election to the Continental Congress, he was allowed to travel to his father.

On March 23, 1776, the General Assembly of South Carolina named Lynch Jr. to the Continental Congress as a sixth delegate. Although he was ill, Lynch Jr. traveled to Philadelphia to sign the Declaration of Independence. Thomas Lynch Sr. and Thomas Lynch Jr. were the only father and son to serve successively in the Continental Congress.

Lynch Jr. was the second youngest delegate in the Continental Congress and filled in his father's place due to illness. The youngest signer, South Carolinian Edward Rutledge, was younger by three months.

Less than a month after signing the Declaration of Independence, Lynch Jr. threatened that South Carolina would secede from the United States; his threat expressed the interests of his constituents, the elite planter class. "If it is debated, whether their Slaves are their Property, there is an End of the Confederation."

After signing the Declaration of Independence, an ill Thomas Lynch Jr. set out for home with his ailing father. On the way to South Carolina, his father suffered a second stroke. He died in Annapolis, Maryland, in December 1776. Thomas Lynch Jr. retired in early 1777.

== Death ==
Lynch suffered for two more years of illness in South Carolina, where he resided with his wife at Peachtree Plantation on the South Santee River. Friends suggested that he travel to Europe in search for a different atmosphere. He and his wife sailed for respite on the brigantine Polly to St. Eustatius in the West Indies on December 17, 1779. The ship is known to have disappeared shortly after. He and his wife were considered to have been lost at sea. At age 30, Lynch was the youngest signer of the Declaration of Independence to die.

== Family estate ==
His will required that the heirs of his female relatives change their last name to Lynch in order to inherit a share of his family estate. At the time of his death, Thomas Lynch Jr. owned three plantations and held more than 250 enslaved African Americans, who were valued as personal property and part of the estate.

His sister, Sabina, responded by changing her name and that of her descendants in order to inherit the estate. She and her husband owned and managed Peachtree Plantation until their son was of age.

Their son, John Bowman Lynch, and his wife had three sons. Henry C. Lynch (1828-1843) died before reaching adulthood. Thomas B. Lynch (1821-1864) died in the American Civil War. James (N.M.) Lynch (1822-1887) lived the longest.

After Sabina Lynch died, the family estate passed to her youngest sister, Aimeé Constance Dé'Illiard Drayton. Thomas Lynch Jr. had specified that the estate should remain in the family.

== Legacy ==
Lynch's birthplace was the Hopsewee Plantation. It is on the National Register of Historic Places and was declared a National Historic Landmark in 1971.

In his 1856 book, Lives of the Signers to the Declaration of Independence, Rev. Charles A Goodrich lauds Lynch "as a man of exalted views and exalted moral worth". Goodrich continues: "In all the relations of life, whether as a husband, a friend, a patriot, or the master of the slave, he appeared conscious of his obligations, and found his pleasure in discharging them."

Autographs by Thomas Lynch Jr. are among the rarest by signers of the Declaration of Independence. His time in Congress lasted less than a year, and for much of this time he was in poor health. Only a single letter has survived, along with a few signatures on historical documents. Many of his autographs have scattered, and others were lost in a fire. Today, Lynch's autograph sells for as much as $250,000.

== In popular culture ==
Lynch Jr. is played by Richard Bond in the 1938 film Declaration of Independence.

== See also ==
- List of people who disappeared mysteriously at sea
- Memorial to the 56 Signers of the Declaration of Independence
