= Thomas Lynch (statesman) =

American politician

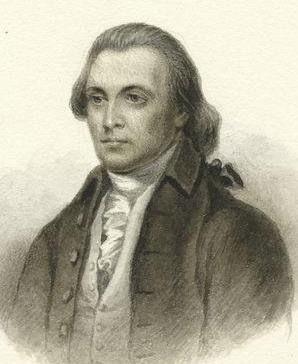
- Thomas Lynch Sr.

Personal details
- Born: 1727 South Carolina
- Died: December 1776 (aged 48–49) Maryland
- Children: Son: Thomas Lynch Jr. Daughter: Elizabeth
- Occupation: member of the First and Second Continental Congresses

Other notable people share this name. See Thomas Lynch (disambiguation).

Thomas Lynch (1727–1776) was an American planter and statesman from South Carolina. He was a delegate to the Stamp Act Congress of 1765 and the Continental Congress from 1774 to 1776, and signed the 1774 Continental Association.

== Political career ==
Lynch was born in St. James Parish, Berkeley County, South Carolina, in 1727. He served in the Colonial Legislature of South Carolina and represented the colony in the Stamp Act Congress, heading the committee which drafted the petition to the House of Commons.

Elected to both the First and Second Continental Congresses, Lynch joined Benjamin Franklin and Benjamin Harrison on a committee sent to Cambridge, Massachusetts, to confer with General George Washington upon "the most effectual method of continuing, supporting, and regulating the Continental Army." In the ensuing discussions, Washington told the committee of his plan to arm ships to prey upon British supply lines. The gentlemen from Congress approved of the scheme and recommended it to Congress, thus giving essential political support to the establishment of "George Washington's Navy," the first organized naval force of the new nation. Member of the Continental Congress in 1774-1776, but was unable to sign the Declaration of Independence because of illness

== Family ==
Thomas Lynch's first marriage, in 1745, was to Elizabeth Allston (1728-1755), who bore him three children. One was Thomas Lynch Jr., who later took his father's seat in Congress and signed the Declaration of Independence. After Elizabeth's death in 1755, Thomas Lynch married Hannah Motte (1736-1805), a sister of Isaac Motte, who became a South Carolina Congressman. Thomas and Hannah had a daughter Elizabeth Lynch, who married James Hamilton; their son James Hamilton Jr. was elected as governor of South Carolina in 1830. After Lynch's death, his widow Hannah Motte Lynch married South Carolina Governor William Moultrie.

== See also ==
- USS Lynch, a 1776 Continental Navy schooner named for Lynch
