= Thomas Lynch (psychiatrist) =

Thomas Lynch (17 November 1922 – 6 January 2005) was the first Professor of Psychiatry at the Royal College of Surgeons in Ireland (RCSI). He was also the first to develop a psychiatric unit in a general hospital in the Republic of Ireland.

He was a founding member of the Mental Health Association of Ireland (now Mental Health Ireland) in 1966 and served on a number of boards including The National Drugs Advisory Board, The National Rehabilitation Board, the Central Remedial Clinic and the Eastern Health Board.

== Background ==
Lynch was born in Dublin on 17 November 1922 to Brigid Lynch, a teacher, and Irish revolutionary and politician Fionán Lynch. He attended St Mary's College, Dublin before beginning medical school at Royal College of Surgeons in Ireland in 1941. In 1956, Lynch married Dr. Sheila O'Donovan, a medical graduate of University College Cork.

== Career ==
After graduating from RCSI in 1946, Lynch completed his internship at the Richmond Surgical Hospital, where he worked for Professor Leonard Abrahamson. Lynch then worked at St Patrick's University Hospital where he obtained membership of the Royal College of Physicians of Ireland and earned a diploma in psychological medicine. In 1952, Lynch spent a year training at the Maudsley Hospital Institute of Psychiatry. He became a staff psychiatrist at St Patrick's University Hospital in 1956.
