= Albany Plan =

18th-century proposal for a government for the Thirteen Colonies

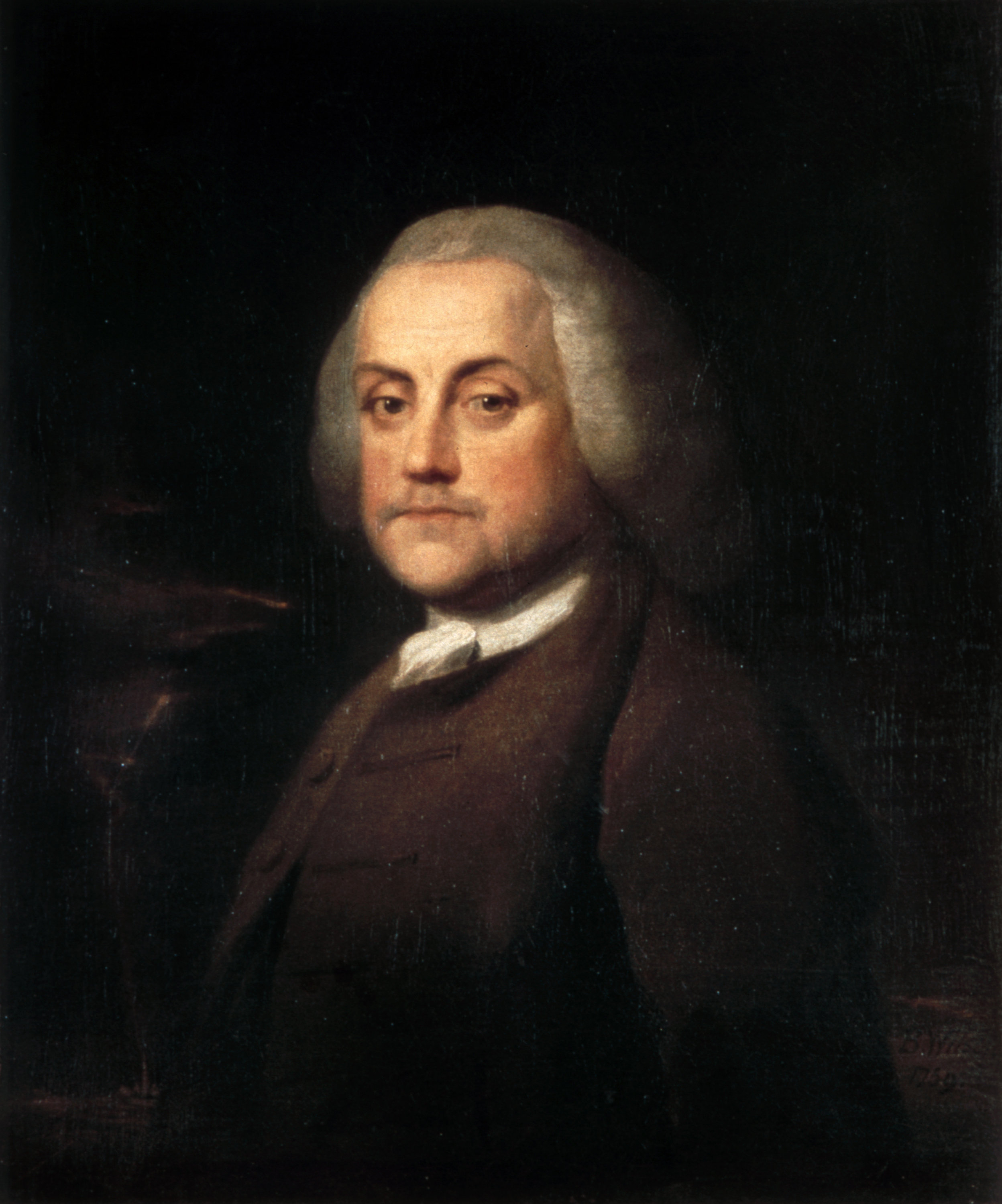
Benjamin Franklin (1759)

The Albany Plan of Union was a rejected plan to create a unified government for the Thirteen Colonies at the Albany Congress on July 10, 1754 in Albany, New York. The plan was suggested by Benjamin Franklin, then a senior leader (age 48) and a delegate from Pennsylvania. Franklin's proposed plan drew on his observations of the Haudenosaunee (Iroquois) and their system of common government. The Plan represented one of multiple early attempts to form a union of the colonies "under one government as far as might be necessary for defense and other general important purposes." The plan was rejected but it was a forerunner for the Articles of Confederation and the United States Constitution.

== Background ==
In July 1754, more than twenty representatives of several Northern Atlantic colonies gathered in Albany to plan their defense related to the French and Indian War (1754–1763), the front in North America of the Seven Years' War between Great Britain and France, spurred on by George Washington's recent defeat in the Ohio valley.

The Albany Congress reviewed different plans offered by delegates, and eventually its members chose Franklin's plan with some small modifications. Benjamin Chew, then a young lawyer from Dover, Pennsylvania, served as secretary, and Richard Peters and Isaac Norris, both from Philadelphia, were among the members of this committee and the Pennsylvania delegation.

It went beyond the original scope of the Congress, which was to develop a plan of defense related to near-term threats by France. The northern colonies were most concerned, as they shared a border with New France, but the mid-Atlantic colonies were also affected by differing loyalties of various Native American nations, usually related to their trading with France or Great Britain. The New England and northern tier colonies had long been subject to raiding from French colonies during times of conflict. The Albany Plan was the first proposed unification of the colonies for the purposes of defense. Benjamin Franklin made a political cartoon to popularize his plan, titled Join, or Die.

== Proposals ==
The plan called for a general government to be administered by a President-General, to be appointed and supported by the Crown, and a Grand Council to consist of delegates nominated by the lower houses of the colonial assemblies. Under the plan, delegates from the colonies would be chosen roughly proportionate to colony size – from a minimum of two to a maximum of seven for Virginia and Massachusetts Bay. Proposed powers included treaty-making, and raising army and naval forces; and, most significantly, included the right of taxation.

After the larger group of delegates discussed their issues and objections, they resolved most of them and adopted the Plan. They sent copies of letters to each of the colonial assemblies and to the British Board of Trade in London, which had originally suggested the Congress. The colonial assemblies and the British representatives rejected the Albany Plan. This rejection was largely spurred by both sides not getting fully what they wanted. Individual colonial assemblies wanted to have more independence than the Plan provided, whereas British officials felt it gave the colonies too much.

Benjamin Franklin wrote of the rejections: "The colonial assemblies and most of the people were narrowly provincial in outlook, mutually jealous, and suspicious of any central taxing authority." Many in the British government, already wary of some of the strong-willed colonial assemblies, disliked the idea of consolidating additional power into their hands. They preferred that the colonies concentrate on their part in the forthcoming military campaign. The Board of Trade never sought official approval for the plan from the Crown. They proposed that colonial governors, along with some members of their respective councils, order the raising of troops and building of forts, to be funded by the treasury of Great Britain. On the basis that such defense measures were the mutual responsibility of the colonies, Parliament decided to impose, for the first time, a direct tax on American colonists through the Stamp Act to recoup the costs of the war.

== Later plans ==
Galloway's Plan of Union, proposed at the First Continental Congress, bore striking resemblance to the Albany Plan. It was submitted by conservative Loyalists and quickly rejected in favor of more radical proposals.

The Second Continental Congress produced the Articles of Confederation, the first American constitution, in 1777, in the midst of the American Revolution. Ratified in 1781, it laid the foundation for the current U.S. Constitution.

== See also ==
- Albany Congress
