= Thomas R. Lynch =

American psychologist, author (born 1956)

- Born: 1956; Decatur, Illinois, United States
- Died: 2026 (aged 69–70)
- Education: Arizona State University, Kent State University, Duke University
- Occupations: Creator of Radically Open Dialectical Behavior Therapy, psychologist, professor, author, artist
- Spouse: Erica
- Children: Kayleigh B. Lynch, LMSW

Thomas R. Lynch (1956–2026) was an American psychologist, author, and treatment developer of radically open dialectical behavior therapy (RO DBT), a type of psychotherapy that targets disorders characterized by excessive self-control (e.g., chronic depression, anorexia nervosa, obsessive–compulsive personality disorder). He was an emeritus Professor of Clinical Psychology at the University of Southampton in Southampton, United Kingdom. He died on November 5, 2026, at his home in France.

== Early life and education ==
Thomas Lynch was born in 1956 in Decatur, Illinois. He attended University of Illinois at Urbana–Champaign in 1975, where he initially majored in fine arts (drawing/painting) and pre-medicine. Lynch transferred to Arizona State University Tempe campus, where he completed his B.S. in Nursing and MS in Psychiatric Nursing (1988), interning at the Gestalt Therapy Institute in Phoenix, AZ. He received his PhD in clinical psychology at Kent State University in 1996 and completed postdoctoral training at Duke University.

== Career ==
From 1998 to 2007, Lynch was a member of the Departments of Psychology and Psychiatry at Duke University, where he was the Director of the Duke Cognitive Behavioral Research and Treatment Program. In 2007, Lynch relocated to Exeter University, and shortly thereafter was appointed Professor of Clinical Psychology. In 2011, he relocated to the University of Southampton, where he served as the Director of the Emotion and Personality Bio-behavioural Laboratory until 2017. He was the Chief Investigator of a multi-center randomized controlled trial funded by the Efficacy and Mechanism Evaluation program and Medical Research Council—Project REFRAMEd—REFRactory: Mechanisms and Effectiveness of Radically Open-Dialectical Behavior Therapy.

== Publications ==
- Lynch has published the treatment manuals Radically Open Dialectical Behavior Therapy: Theory and Practice for Treating Disorders of Overcontrol and The Skills Training Manual for Radically Open Dialectical Behavior Therapy: A Clinician's Guide for Treating Disorders of Overcontrol.
- The Radically Open Dialectical Behavior Therapy Workbook; Skills to Overcome the Paradox of Perfectionism, Anxiety, Depression, and Other Disorders of Overcontrol by Thomas R. Lynch and J. Nicole Little.
