= Galloway's Plan of Union =

1774 plan to unite British America to Great Britain

Galloway's Plan of Union was a plan to politically unite Great Britain and its North American colonies. The plan was put forward by Loyalist Joseph Galloway in the First Continental Congress of 1774 but was rejected. Galloway was a Pennsylvania delegate who wanted to keep the Thirteen Colonies in the British Empire.

== General ==
Galloway suggested the creation of an American colonial parliament to act together with the Parliament of Great Britain. The Grand Council would have to give formal consent to the latter's decisions, particularly on trade and taxation, thus giving it a veto.

The Colonial Parliament would consist of a President-General appointed by the Crown and delegates appointed by the colonial assemblies for three-year terms. The plan would have kept the British Empire together and allowed the colonies to have some say over their own affairs, including the inflammatory issue of taxation.

Galloway's Plan of Union was narrowly defeated after a motion to shelve his plan passed six to five on September 28, 1774, and a subsequent motion to reconsider his plan was rejected on October 22, 1774. The appearance of the Suffolk Resolves at the Congress led to a polarization of discussion, with the radicals swiftly gaining the upper hand.

== Galloway and Albany Plans ==
The proposed Galloway Plan bore striking resemblance to the Albany Plan, a proposal by Galloway's fellow Pennsylvania delegate (and active correspondent) Benjamin Franklin at the Albany Congress in July 1754 to create a unified government for the Thirteen Colonies. The Albany Plan went beyond the original scope of the Albany Congress, which was to develop a plan of defense for the French and Indian War.

== Aftermath ==
Although as a delegate to the Continental Congress Galloway was a moderate, when his Plan of Union (despite its removal of British Parliamentary sovereignty) was rejected, Galloway moved increasingly towards Loyalism. After 1778, he lived in Britain, where he acted as a leader of the Loyalist movement and an advisor to the government. Once Britain's Parliament accepted American independence as part of the Peace of Paris (1783), many Loyalists went into forced exile, and Galloway permanently settled in Britain.

However, Galloway's Union can be considered a primitive Commonwealth realm, the style of personal union that Antigua and Barbuda, Australia, The Bahamas, Belize, Canada, Grenada, Jamaica, New Zealand, Papua New Guinea, Saint Kitts and Nevis, Saint Lucia, Saint Vincent and the Grenadines, Solomon Islands, and Tuvalu have with the United Kingdom today, with the President-General becoming the modern-day Governor-General.
