= Proclamation of Rebellion =

1775 British declaration of rebellion in the American colonies

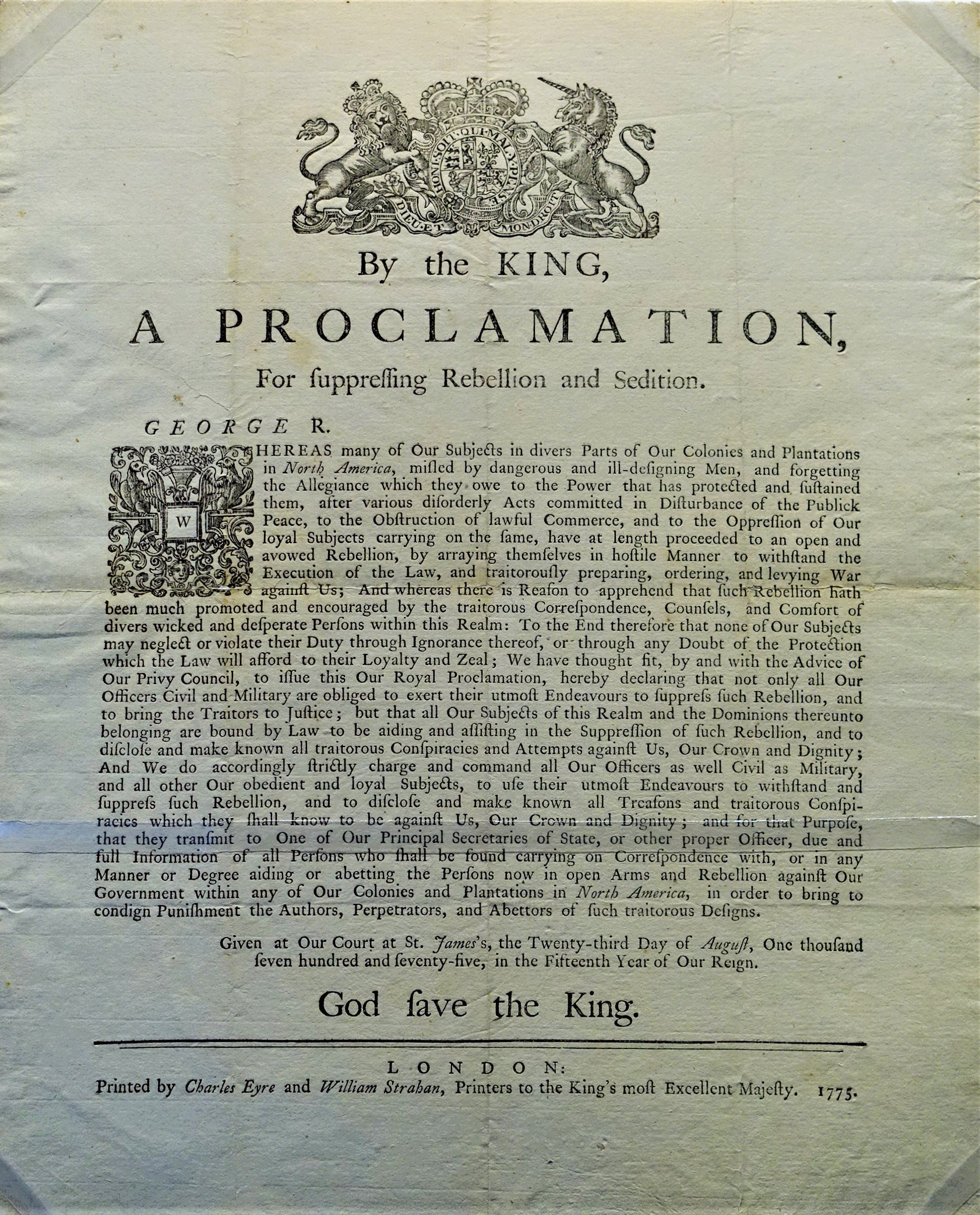
- Eyre and Strahan Broadside
- Date effective: 23 August 1775
- Repealed: 5 December 1782 (de facto)
- Signatories: George III of Great Britain
- Subject: American Revolution

Full text
- Declaration of Rebellion at Wikisource

The Proclamation of Rebellion, officially titled A Proclamation for Suppressing Rebellion and Sedition, was the response of King George III to the news of the Battle of Bunker Hill at the outset of the American Revolutionary War. Issued on 23 August 1775, it declared elements of the American colonies in a state of "open and avowed rebellion". It ordered officials of the empire "to use their utmost endeavours to withstand and suppress such rebellion". The 1775 proclamation of rebellion also encouraged subjects throughout the empire, including those in Britain, to report anyone carrying on "traitorous correspondence" with the rebels to be punished.

== Implementation ==
The Proclamation of Rebellion was drafted before Colonial Secretary Lord Dartmouth had been given a copy of the Second Continental Congress's Olive Branch Petition written in July 1775. King George III, however, refused to receive the colonial petition, so the Proclamation of Rebellion of 23 August 1775 effectively served as the King's answer to it.

On 27 October, North's Cabinet expanded on the proclamation in the Speech from the Throne read by King George III at the opening of Parliament. The King's speech insisted that rebellion was being fomented by a "desperate conspiracy" of leaders whose claims of allegiance to the King were insincere; what the rebels really wanted, he said, was to create an "independent empire". The speech indicated that King George intended to deal with the crisis with armed force and was even considering "friendly offers of foreign assistance" to suppress the rebellion without pitting Briton against Briton. A pro-American minority of members within Parliament at the time warned the government was driving the colonists towards independence, something many colonial leaders insisted they did not desire.

== American response ==
The King's proclamation and the speech from the throne undermined moderates in Congress like John Dickinson, who had been arguing that the King would find a way to resolve the dispute between colonies and Parliament. Over the decade of gradually escalating tension between Parliament and the colonies over taxation and other issues, countless colonial petitions had expressed loyalty to the king and implored him to intervene on their behalf. Even the Olive Branch Petition continued to blame Parliament and the "irksome variety of artifices practised by many of your Majesty's Ministers" for the troubles. However, the Proclamation made it abundantly clear that George III was not inclined to act as a conciliator and never had been.

On 6 December 1775, the Continental Congress issued a response to the Proclamation of Rebellion saying that, while they had always been loyal to the King, Parliament never had legitimate claim to authority over them, because the colonies were not democratically represented. Congress argued it was their duty to continue resisting Parliament's violations of the British Constitution, and that—while they continued to hope to avoid the "calamities" of a "civil war"—would retaliate if any supporters in Great Britain were punished for "favouring, aiding, or abetting the cause of American liberty."

The king's strongly worded proclamation and subsequent preparations for a massive military expedition across the Atlantic decreased attachment to the crown and increased support for the idea of colonial independence, culminating in America's Declaration of Independence on 4 July 1776.

== Revocation ==
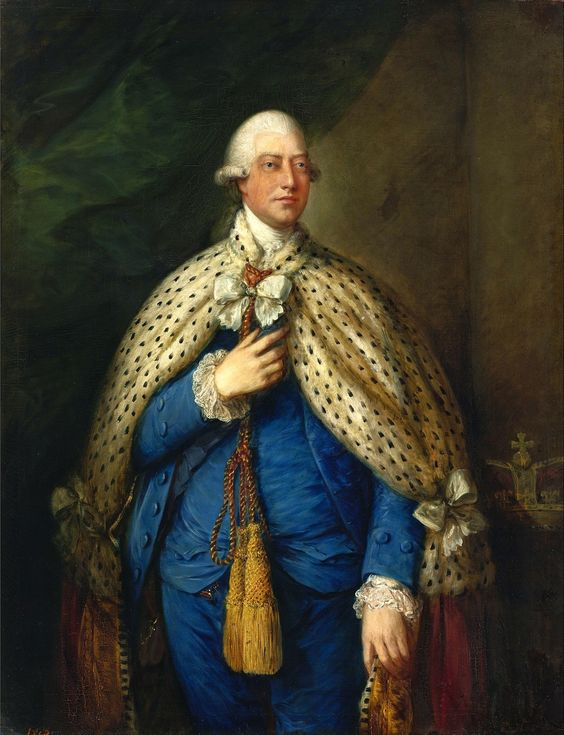
A 1785 portrait of King George III in his parliamentary robes

King George III addressed the opening session of Parliament on 5 December 1782 in a Speech from the Throne. It was his first address since the resignation of Lord North as his wartime prime minister, which was delivered in the last session at Parliament's resolution to end offensive war in North America. In the intervening time the King assured his Lords and Gentlemen that he had lost no time ordering the end of "the further prosecution of offensive war upon the continent of North America".

After considering his option to renounce the British crown and retire to his German estates as Prince of Brunswick in the Holy Roman Empire, George III reassured Parliament that he would follow the wishes of "my Parliament and my people" as he had promised at his coronation Speech from the Throne. George III then reported to the joint session that he had offered the American Congress his declaration of the rebelling North American colonies as "free and independent states" in the final treaty of peace and gave notice to Parliament that had been agreed upon, as well as other preliminary terms.

His closing remark on American independence was, "Religion, language, interest, affections may, and I hope will, yet prove a bond of permanent union between the two countries. To this end, neither attention nor disposition shall be wanting on my part."
