= Tomb of the Unknown Revolutionary War Soldier =

Memorial in Philadelphia, Pennsylvania

Coordinates: 39°56′50″N 75°09′11″W

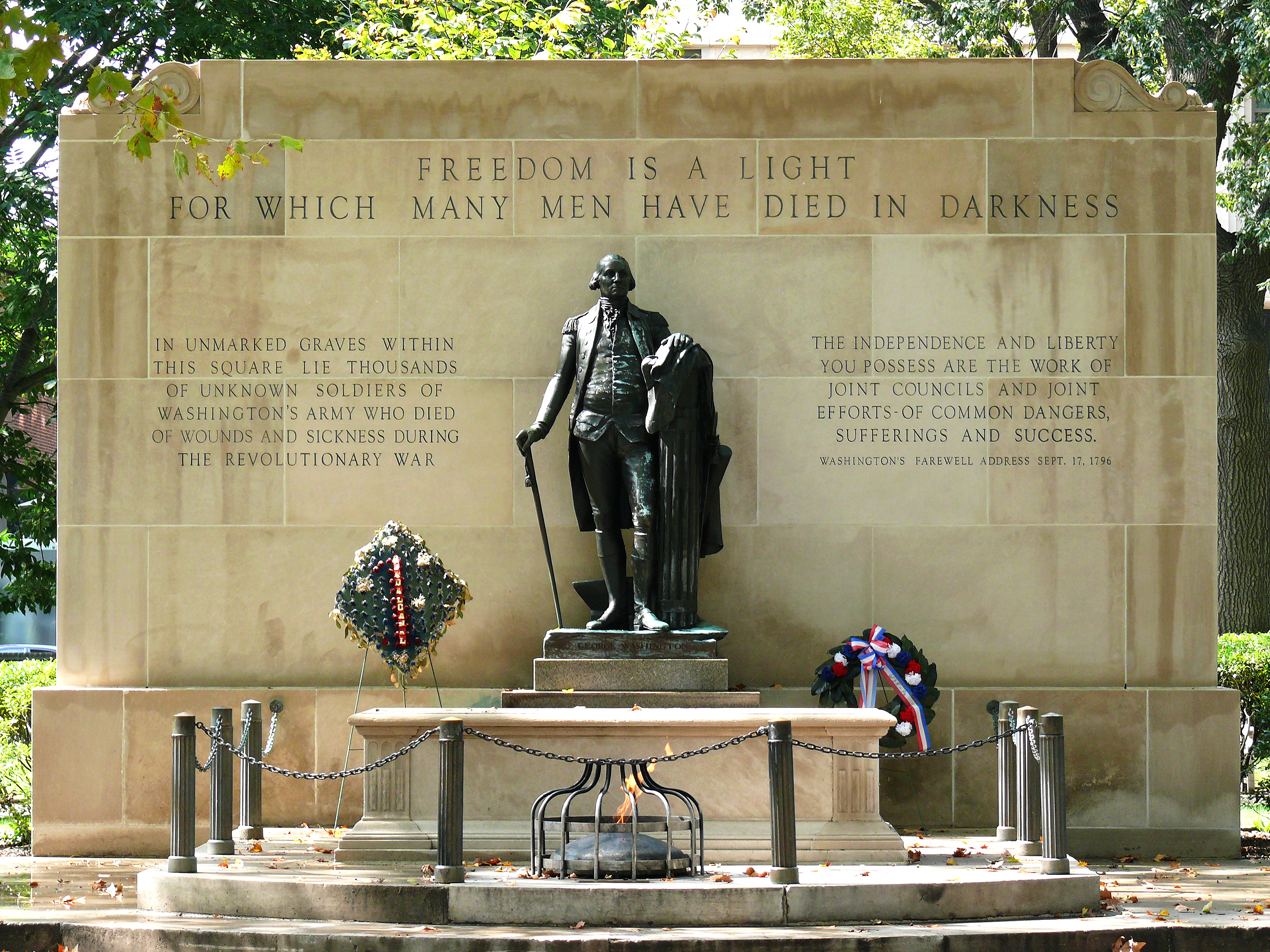
The Tomb of the Unknown Soldier in Philadelphia

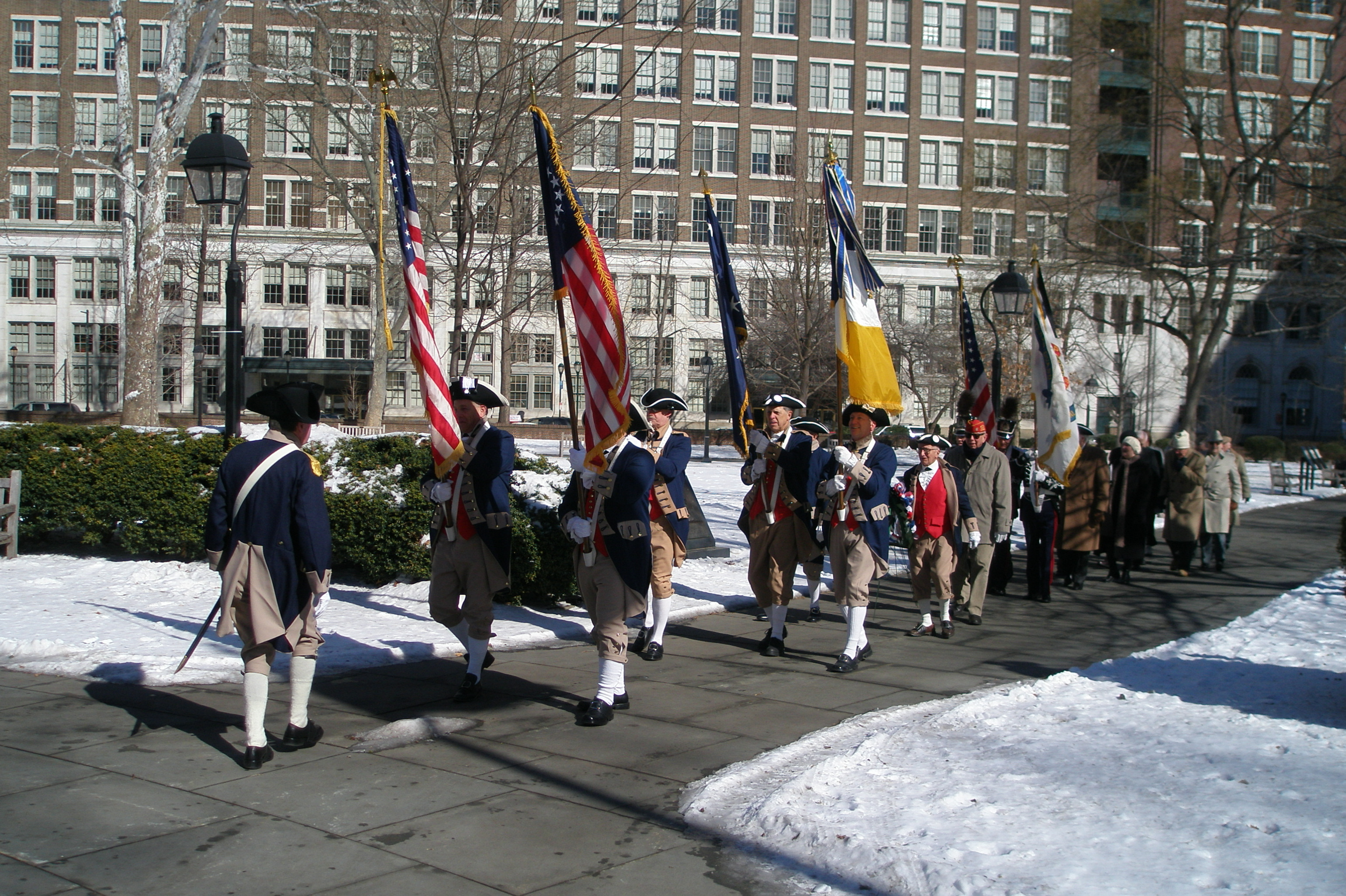
Philadelphia Continental Chapter of the SAR at a ceremony commemorating the birth of George Washington

The Tomb of the Unknown Revolutionary War Soldier, also known as the Tomb of the Unknown Soldier of the American Revolution, is a war memorial located within Washington Square in Philadelphia, Pennsylvania. The memorial honors the thousands of soldiers who died during the American Revolutionary War, many of whom were buried in mass graves in the square. The tomb and Washington Square are part of Independence National Historical Park.

The memorial was first conceived in 1954 by the Washington Square Planning Committee, and was completed in 1957. The monument was designed by architect G. Edwin Brumbaugh and includes an eternal flame and a bronze cast of Jean Antoine Houdon's statue of George Washington as the monument's centerpiece. The tomb includes remains which were disinterred, after archeological examination, from beneath the square. The remains are that of a soldier, but it is uncertain if he was Colonial or British. An unknown number of bodies were buried beneath the square and the surrounding area. Remains are still occasionally found during construction and maintenance projects.

Engraved in the side of the tomb are these words:

- "Freedom is a light for which many men have died in darkness"
- "The independence and liberty you possess are the work of joint councils and joint efforts of common dangers, suffering and success." (Washington Farewell Address, Sept. 17, 1796)
- "In unmarked graves within this square lie thousands of unknown soldiers of Washington's Army who died of wounds and sickness during the Revolutionary War."

The plaque on the tomb reads:

- "Beneath this stone rests a soldier of Washington's army who died to give you liberty."

== Vandalism ==
On June 12, 2020, the tomb was vandalized when someone spray painted “committed genocide" and "ACAB" on the face of the tomb.

== See also ==
- List of public art in Philadelphia
- List of statues of George Washington
- List of sculptures of presidents of the United States
- Pennsylvania in the American Revolution
