= Olive Branch Petition =

1775 final affirmation of the 13 Colonies' loyalty to Great Britain

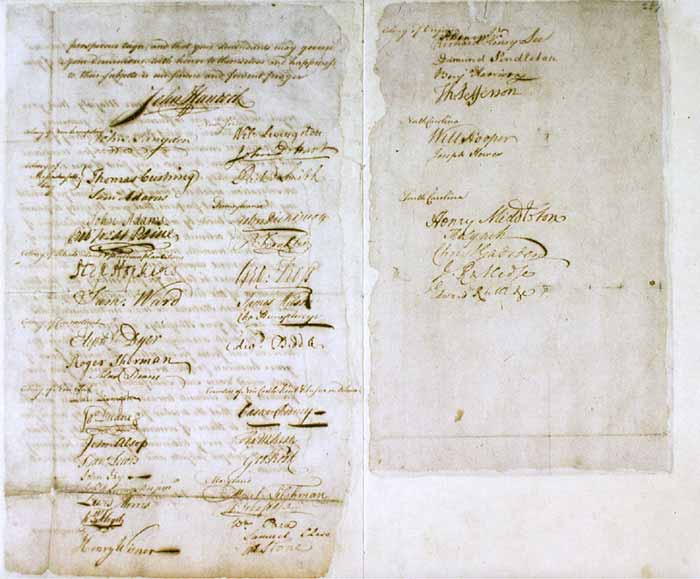
- Signature page of the Olive Branch Petition, with John Hancock's prominent signature at the top
- Ratified: July 5, 1775
- Signatories: Second Continental Congress
- Purpose: Avoiding war between Great Britain and the Thirteen Colonies

Full text
- Olive Branch Petition at Wikisource

The Olive Branch Petition was adopted by the Second Continental Congress on July 5, 1775, and signed on July 8, 1775, in a final attempt to avoid war between Great Britain and the Thirteen Colonies in America. The Congress had already authorized the invasion of Canada more than a week earlier, but the petition affirmed American loyalty to Great Britain and entreated King George III to prevent further conflict. It was followed by the July 6, 1775 Declaration of the Causes and Necessity of Taking Up Arms, however, which made its success unlikely in London. In August 1775, the colonies were formally declared to be in rebellion by the Proclamation of Rebellion, and the petition was rejected by the British government; King George had refused to read it before declaring the colonists traitors.

== Drafting ==
The Second Continental Congress convened in present-day Independence Hall in the revolutionary capital of Philadelphia in May 1775, and most of its delegates initially supported fellow delegate John Dickinson in his quest to attempt to reconcile with King George III. But a smaller group of delegates to the Second Continental Congress, led by John Adams, argued that war with the British would ultimately prove inevitable, and they instead abstained from supporting Dickinson's efforts, choosing instead to await a suitable moment to rally the Thirteen Colonies in support of war and the cause of American independence.

The disengagement of this smaller number of delegates, however, allowed Dickinson and the delegates who supported his efforts to attempt to reconcile their differences and concerns with the British.

Dickinson was the primary author of the Olive Branch Petition, and Benjamin Franklin, John Jay, John Rutledge, and Thomas Johnson served on the drafting committee for the document. Dickinson claimed that the Thirteen Colonies did not seek complete independence from the British Empire, but did seek more equitable trade and tax regulations.

Dickinson asked that King George III establish a lasting settlement between Great Britain and the colonies "upon so firm a basis as to perpetuate its blessings, uninterrupted by any future dissensions, to succeeding generations in both countries", beginning with the repeal of the Intolerable Acts. The introductory paragraph of the letter named twelve of the thirteen colonies, all except Georgia. The letter was approved on July 5 and was signed by John Hancock, President of the Second Continental Congress, and by representatives of these twelve colonies. On July 8, 1775, the letter was sent to London in the care of Richard Penn and Arthur Lee.

The letter is housed in the National Archives in London. Dickinson hoped that news of the Battles of Lexington and Concord combined with the "humble petition" would persuade the King to respond with a counter-proposal or open negotiations.

== Reception and rejection ==
John Adams, a delegate to the Second Continental Congress and advocate of full independence from the British Empire, wrote a friend, saying that the petition served no purpose, that war with the British was inevitable, and that the Thirteen Colonies should have already raised a navy and taken British officials as prisoners. Adams' letter was intercepted by British officials, and news of its contents reached Great Britain at about the same time as the petition itself arrived. British advocates of a military response used Adams' letter to argue that the petition itself was insincere.

Penn and Lee provided a copy of the petition to colonial secretary Lord Dartmouth on August 21, followed with the original on September 1. They reported back on September 2, writing, "we were told that as his Majesty did not receive it on the throne, no answer would be given."

By this time, King George III had already issued his Proclamation of Rebellion on August 23 in response to news of the Battle of Bunker Hill, declaring the Thirteen Colonies to be in a state of open rebellion and ordering "all Our officers ... and all Our obedient and loyal subjects, to use their utmost endeavours to withstand and suppress such rebellion". The hostilities which Adams had foreseen undercut the petition, and the King had answered it before it even reached him.

== Consequences ==
King George III's refusal to consider the petition gave John Adams and others the opportunity they sought to push for the colonies' full independence and to argue that the King was intransigent and uninterested in addressing the colonists' grievances.

Adams served to polarize the issue in the minds of many in the Thirteen Colonies, who began to see that there was little promise for reconciliation and that only two realistic options existed: complete independence, which made war with the British practically inevitable, or complete submission to British colonial rule. Thomas Paine further expanded this recognition in Common Sense, his widely-read pamphlet, which was published in January 1776, six months before the Second Continental Congress agreed to unanimously adopt and publish the Declaration of Independence, largely authored by Thomas Jefferson, which detailed the grievances of the Thirteen Colonies and the case for their independence.

== See also ==
- Founding Fathers of the United States
- Journals of the Continental Congress
