= Henry Fite House =

Meeting site of the Second Continental Congress

"Henry Fite House" (later Tavern/Hotel)
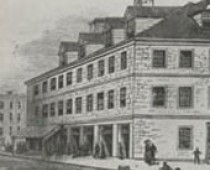
- Henry Fite House in Baltimore
- Alternative names: Congress Hall, Old Congress Hall

General information
- Status: Destroyed by fire
- Type: Tavern
- Architectural style: Georgian (red brick with white wood trim)
- Location: Southwest corner, West Baltimore (then known as Market) Street, and Liberty - South Sharp Streets, (later also known as Hopkins Place), (current site): Baltimore Civic Center [1962], (now CFG Bank Arena), Baltimore Town, county seat of Baltimore County,, U.S.
- Coordinates: 39°17′19″N 76°37′8″W
- Completed: c. 1770
- Destroyed: Sunday/Monday, February 7–8, 1904, Great Baltimore Fire
- Owner: Henry Fite, (1722–1789), later: daughter, Elizabeth Fite Reinicker

Height
- Height: three-and-half stories

Dimensions
- Other dimensions: 92 feet (28 m) x 50 feet (15 m)

Technical details
- Floor count: 3 plus attic and cellar

The Henry Fite House, located on West Baltimore Street (then known as Market Street), between South Sharp and North Liberty Streets, later known as Hopkins Place, in Baltimore, Maryland, was the meeting site of the Second Continental Congress from December 20, 1776 until February 22, 1777.

Built as an inn and tavern around 1770 in the Georgian architectural style in red brick with white wood trim by Henry Fite (1722–1789), the building became known as Congress Hall when it served for two months as the new nation's seat of government in 1776–77. Later, following the Revolutionary War, it became known locally as Old Congress Hall. The structure was destroyed during the Great Baltimore Fire of February 7–8, 1904, which started nearby.

== Nation's capital ==
The Second Continental Congress moved from Philadelphia to Baltimore in the winter of 1776 to avoid capture by British forces, who were advancing on Philadelphia, the new American capital city, during the New York and New Jersey campaign designed to capture and occupy the revolutionary capital. As the largest building then in 47-year-old Baltimore, Henry Fite's six-year-old tavern provided a comfortable location of sufficient size for the Congress to meet; its site at the western edge of town was beyond easy reach of the British Royal Navy's ships and artillery should they try to sail up the Harbor and the Patapsco River to shell the town. A visitor described the tavern as a "three-story and attic brick house, of about 92 feet front on Market Street, by about 50 or 55 feet depth on the side streets, with cellar under the whole; having 14 rooms, exclusive of kitchen, wash-house and other out-buildings, including a stable for 30 horses."

Baltimore became the nation's capital for a two-month period. While meeting at the Henry Fite House on December 27, 1776, the Continental Congress conferred upon General George Washington, (1732–1799), "extraordinary powers for the conduct of the Revolutionary War", a stirring vote of confidence a year and-a-half after the Congress commissioned him as head of the newly organized Continental Army. The selection of Washington as the Continental Army's commander-in-chief followed a series of defeats and retreats since the Virginian assumed command in June 1775, when the Army recruited from local militia surrounded the British in a siege at Boston after the opening skirmishes in April at Lexington and Concord in Lexington, Massachusetts and Concord, New Hampshire followed by a British attack in June at Breed's and Bunker Hills across the Charles River from Boston.

In her 1907 biography of the Fite family, descendant Elizabeth Fite corrected earlier historians who mistakenly reported Jacob Fite as the owner of the house. She explained that while Henry's son, Jacob, lived in the house, he was a child when the building was occupied by Congress and never actually owned the building. After Henry died on October 25, 1789, his estate was distributed among his seven surviving children; the "Henry Fite House" became the property of his eldest daughter, Elizabeth, and her husband, George Reinicker.

== George Peabody ==
Philanthropist and international financier George Peabody (1795–1869), of South Danvers (later Peabody), Massachusetts, and New York City, moved to Baltimore in 1816. The "Henry Fite House" served as his home and office during the next 20 years in the 1820s and 30s, where he directed his growing wide-ranging business, financial and investment empire, which by mid-century had made him the richest man in America. He later endowed the Peabody Institute in 1857, which opened nine years later with the adjoining Library in 1878. Along with the additional educational, cultural and civic programs in the mid-1860s, the Institute and Conservatory were to be built across from the Washington Monument on the Circle at North Charles and East Monument Streets (also known as Washington Place and Mount Vernon Place) in the northern city neighborhood of Mount Vernon-Belvedere formerly known as "Howard's Woods" on the "Belvidere" estate and mansion of Revolutionary War commander of the Maryland Line in the Continental Army, Col. John Eager Howard (1752-1827) who donated the land. Later during the decades following his 1827 death, his sons and family cut up and divided the estate building large elaborate substantial townhouses on a grid of streets including Peabody's Institute added north of original colonial era in Baltimore Town.

Peabody left Baltimore for New York City and later London in 1837, as more and more of his international financial and business affairs consumed his time. His most famous return to the city was in 1866 (three years before his death) to address the large crowd of Baltimoreans including Baltimore City Public School children gathered on the front steps of his new Institute when it was finally dedicated in an elaborate ceremony after a long interval, interrupted by the Civil War.

== CFG Bank Arena ==
The former location of the "Henry Fite House" is currently occupied by the CFG Bank Arena, previously known as Baltimore Civic Center (1961–1986), Baltimore Arena (1986–2003, 2013–2014, 2022), 1st Mariner Arena (2003–2013), and Royal Farms Arena (2014–2022). Built in 1961–62 in the western downtown area, with a civic auditorium, arena, convention hall and exhibition galleries, the building became a center of Baltimore's sports and entertainment life. It covers the city block bounded by West Baltimore Street (north), Hopkins Place (east), Howard Street (west) and West Lombard Street (south).

== Memorial tablet ==
The Maryland Society of the Sons of the American Revolution placed a large, elaborate, polished bronze memorial tablet in front of the "Henry Fite House" on February 22, 1894, describing the building's service to the nation. An inscription on the tablet proclaimed to visitors: "On this site stood Old Congress Hall, in which the Continental Congress met". Ten years later, only the memorial tablet remained on the corner of the smoking ruins after the Great Fire on February 7–8, 1904, which devastated most of downtown Baltimore and the waterfront.

When the Civic Center (now CFG Bank Arena) was built on the site, the bronze tablet of 1894 was preserved and mounted on the outside wall facing Hopkins Place, near the northeast corner of the building. During a later remodel, the plaque was moved inside the new glass-enclosed lobby.

== See also ==
- Former national capitals
- Maryland in the American Revolution
- History of Baltimore
- History of Maryland
- Timeline of Baltimore history
- United Colonies
