= Pennsylvania Archives =

The Pennsylvania Archives are a 138 volume set of reference books compiling transcriptions of letters and early records relating to the colony and state of Pennsylvania. The volumes were published in nine different series between 1838 and 1935 by acts of the Pennsylvania legislature. Contents of the archives include:

- Letters between key government figures in Pennsylvania
- Papers of the Governors
- Marriage Licenses issued prior to 1810
- Militia and Continental Muster Rolls including French-Indian War, Revolutionary War and War of 1812
- Revolutionary Diaries
- County Tax Lists (typically of the Revolutionary era)
- Oaths of Allegiance
- Ship Lists (compiling German immigrants during 18th century)
- Land related records
- Election returns

== References to volumes ==
- Lost in Pennsylvania? Try the Published Pennsylvania Archives by Christine Crawford-Oppenheimer, M.L.S., 1999, The Genealogical Society of Pennsylvania
- Guide to the Published Archives of Pennsylvania Covering the 138 Volumes of Colonial records and Pennsylvania Archives, Series I-IX by Henry Howard, Pennsylvania Historical and Museum Commission, 1949

=== Colonial records ===
- Vol I – Minutes of the Provincial Council 1683–1700
- Vol II – Minutes of the Provincial Council 1700–1717
- Vol III – Minutes of the Provincial Council 1717–1736
- Vol IV – Minutes of the Provincial Council 1736–1745
- Vol V – Minutes of the Provincial Council 1745–1754
- Vol VI – Minutes of the Provincial Council 1754–1756
- Vol VII – Minutes of the Provincial Council 1756–1758
- Vol VIII – Minutes of the Provincial Council 1757–1762
- Vol IX – Minutes of the Provincial Council 1762–1771
- Vol X – Minutes of the Provincial Council 1771–1775
- Vol XI – Minutes of Supreme Exec. Council 1776–1779
- Vol XII – Minutes of Supreme Exec. Council 1779–1781
- Vol XIII – Minutes of Supreme Exec. Council 1781–1784
- Vol XIV – Minutes of Supreme Exec. Council 1784–1786
- Vol XV – Minutes of Supreme Exec. Council 1784–1786
- Vol XVI – Minutes of Supreme Exec. Council 1789–1790
- Vol XVII – General Index to the Colonial Records

=== First series ===
- Vol I – Pennsylvania Archives Commencing 1644
- Vol II – Pennsylvania Archives Commencing 1748
- Vol III – Pennsylvania Archives Commencing 1756
- Vol IV – Pennsylvania Archives Commencing 1760
- Vol V – Pennsylvania Archives Commencing 1776
- Vol VI – Pennsylvania Archives Commencing 1777
- Vol VII – Pennsylvania Archives Commencing 1778
- Vol VIII – Pennsylvania Archives Commencing 1779
- Vol IX – Pennsylvania Archives Commencing 1781
- Vol X – Pennsylvania Archives Commencing 1783
- Vol XI – Pennsylvania Archives Commencing 1786
- Vol XII – Pennsylvania Archives Commencing 1790

=== Second series ===
- Vol I – Minutes of the Board of War March 14, 1777 – August 7, 1777
- Vol II – Pennsylvania Marriage Licenses Previous to 1790
- Vol III – Persons Who Took Oath of Allegiance to the State 1776 – 1794, Papers Relating to the War of the Revolution
- Vol IV – Papers of the Whiskey Insurrection of Western Pennsylvania 1794
- Vol V – Papers Relating to Colonies on the Delaware 1614 – 1682
- Vol VI – Papers Relating to French Occupation of Western Pennsylvania
- Vol VII – Papers Relating to Provincial Affairs – 1682–1750
- Vol VIII – Record of Pennsylvania Marriages Prior to 1810 Vol I
- Vol IX – Record of Pennsylvania Marriages Prior to 1810 Vol II
- Vol X – War of Revolution Battalions and Line 1775–1783 Vol I
- Vol XI – War of Revolution Battalions and Line 1775–1783 Vol II
- Vol XII – Muster Rolls of Pennsylvania Volunteers War of 1812 – 1814
- Vol XIII – Pennsylvania in the War of the Revolution Associated Battalions and Militia 1775 – 1783 Vol I
- Vol XIV – Pennsylvania in the War of the Revolution Associated Battalions and Militia 1775 – 1783 Vol II
- Vol XV – Journals and Diaries of the War of the Revolution List of Officers and Soldiers 1775 – 1783
- Vol XVI – The Breviate in the Boundary Dispute with Maryland
- Vol XVII – Foreigners Who Took Oath of Allegiance to the Province, 1727 – 1775 and Foreign Arrivals 1786 – 1808
- Vol XVIII – Documents Relating to the Connecticut Settlement in Wyoming Valley
- Vol XIX – Minutes of Board of Property of Province of Pennsylvania Vol I

=== Third series ===
- Vol I – Minutes of Board of Property to Lands in Pennsylvania
- Vol II – Minutes of Board of Property of Lands in Pennsylvania – Proprietary (Old) Rights
- Vol III – Old Rights, Proprietary Rights, Virginia Entries and Soldiers Entitled to Donation Lands
- Vol IV – Draughts of the Proprietary Manors of the Province
- Vol V – State of Accounts of County Lieutenants During the War of the Revolution 1777 – 1789 Vol One
- Vol VI – State of Accounts of County Lieutenants During the War of the Revolution 1777 – 1789 Vol Two
- Vol VII – State of Accounts of County Lieutenants During the War of the Revolution 1777 – 1789 Vol Three
- Vol VIII – Commissions Issued by the Province With Official Proclamations Vol One
- Vol IX – Commissions Issued by the Province With Official Proclamations Vol Two
- Vol X – Commissions Issued by the Province With Official Proclamations Vol Three
- Vol XI – Proprietary Tax Lists of the County of Chester 1765, 1766, 1767, 1768, 1769, 1771
- Vol XII – Proprietary Tax Lists of the County of Chester 1774, 1779, 1780, 1781, 1785
- Vol XIII – Proprietary and Other Tax Lists County of Bucks 1779, 1781, 1782, 1783, 1784, 1785, 1786
- Vol XIV – Proprietary, Supply and State Tax Lists of the City and County of Philadelphia 1769, 1774, 1779
- Vol XV – Supply and State Tax Lists of the City and County of Philadelphia 1779, 1780, 1781
- Vol XVI – Proprietary, Supply and State Tax Lists of the City and County of Philadelphia 1781, 1782, 1783
- Vol XVII – Proprietary Tax Lists of the County of Lancaster County 1771, 1772, 1773, 1779
- Vol XVIII – Proprietary Tax Lists of the County of Berks 1767, 1768, 1779, 1780, 1781, 1784, 1785
- Vol XIX – Supply and Tax Lists for Northampton and Northumberland Counties 1772 to 1787
- Vol XX – State and Supply Transcripts of the County of Cumberland 1778, 1779, 1780, 1781, 1782, 1785
- Vol XXI – Returns of Taxables for County of York 1779, 1780, 1781, 1782, 1783
- Vol XXII – Return of Taxables for the Counties of Bedford (1773 – 1784), Huntingdon (1788), Westmoreland (1783, 1786), Fayette (1783, 1786), Allegheny (1791) & Washington Counties (1786) and Census of Bedford (1784) and Westmorland (1783)
- Vol XXIII – Navy and Line, Militia and Rangers 1775 – 1783 and List of Pensioners, 1818 – 1832
- Vol XXIV – Provincial Papers Warranties of Land in the Several Counties 1730 – 1898
- Vol XXV – Provincial Papers Warrantees of Land in the Several Counties 1730 – 1898
- Vol XXVI – Provincial Papers Warrantees of Land in the Several Counties 1730 – 1898
- Vol XXVII – Content of Vols I – XXVI and Index to Vols XI – XVI AA – CO
- Vol XVIII – Index to Vols XI – XXVI CO – JU
- Vol XXIX – Index to Vols XI – XXVI KA – RE
- Vol XXX – Index to Vols XI – XXVI RE – ZY

=== Fourth series ===
- Vol I – Papers of the Governors 1681 – 1747
- Vol II – Papers of the Governors 1747 – 1759
- Vol III – Papers of the Governors 1759 – 1785
- Vol IV – Papers of the Governors 1785 – 1817
- Vol V – Papers of the Governors 1817 – 1832
- Vol VI – Papers of the Governors 1832 – 1845
- Vol VII – Papers of the Governors 1845 – 1858
- Vol VIII – Papers of the Governors 1858 – 1871
- Vol IX – Papers of the Governors 1871 – 1883
- Vol X – Papers of the Governors 1883 – 1891
- Vol XI – Papers of the Governors 1891 – 1897
- Vol XII – Papers of the Governors 1897 – 1902

=== Fifth series ===
- Vol I – Officers and Soldiers in the Province of Pennsylvania 1744 – 1765
- Vol II – Col. Thompson's Battalion of Riflemen June 25, 1775 – July 1, 1776
- Vol III – Continental Line – Fifth Pennsylvania Jan 1, 1717 – Jan 1, 1783
- Vol IV – The Invalid Regiment – Col. Lewis Nicola June 20, 1777 – 1783
- Vol V – Associators and Militia Pennsylvania
- Vol VI – Muster Rolls – Associators and Militia of the County of Cumberland
- Vol VII – Muster Rolls – Associators and Militia of the County of Lancaster
- Vol VIII – Muster Rolls – Associators and Militia of the County of Northampton

=== Sixth series ===
- Vol I – Muster Rolls – Associators and Militia of the City of Philadelphia
- Vol II – Muster Rolls – Associators and Militia of the County of Washington
- Vol III – Militia Rolls – 1783 – 1790
- Vol IV – Military Abstracts from Executive Minutes Vols 1 – 9 Inclusive 1790 – 1817
- Vol V – Muster and Pay Roll Pennsylvania Militia 1790 – 1800
- Vol VI – Egypt Reformed Church Lehigh County 1734 – 1834 Translated
- Vol VII – War 1812 – 1814
- Vol VIII – Troops Under Cols Fenton, Rees Hill, Gens Harrison, Crook, Col Rush, Major Wersler and Those Who Rendezvonsed (sic) at Camp Dupont, Erie, Lancaster, Marcus Hook and York, Miscellaneous Rolls
- Vol IX – Miscellaneous Papers – Drafted Troops 1812 – 1814
- Vol X – Expenditures by the State of Pennsylvania on Account of the United States 1812 – 1814
- Vol XI – Election Returns
- Vol XII – Forfeited Estates
- Vol XIII – Forfeited Estates Inventories & Sales
- Vol XIV – Book of Dr Ewing to Settle Boundary, Orderly Books, Hand's Brigade Wyoming to Tioga, Early Petitions
- Vol XV – Part I Index to Fifth Series – Armstrong to Lear
- Vol XV – Part II Index to Fifth Series – Leard to Zwolley

=== Seventh series ===
- Vol I – Index to Sixth Series Aamnsburg to Dehl
- Vol II – Index to Sixth Series Dehl to Holding
- Vol III – Index to Sixth Series Holdman to Mickley
- Vol IV – Index to Sixth Series Mickli to Shafer
- Vol V – Index to Sixth Series Shafer to Zwernss
