= Second Continental Congress =

1775–1781 convention of the Thirteen Colonies

- Part of the American Revolution
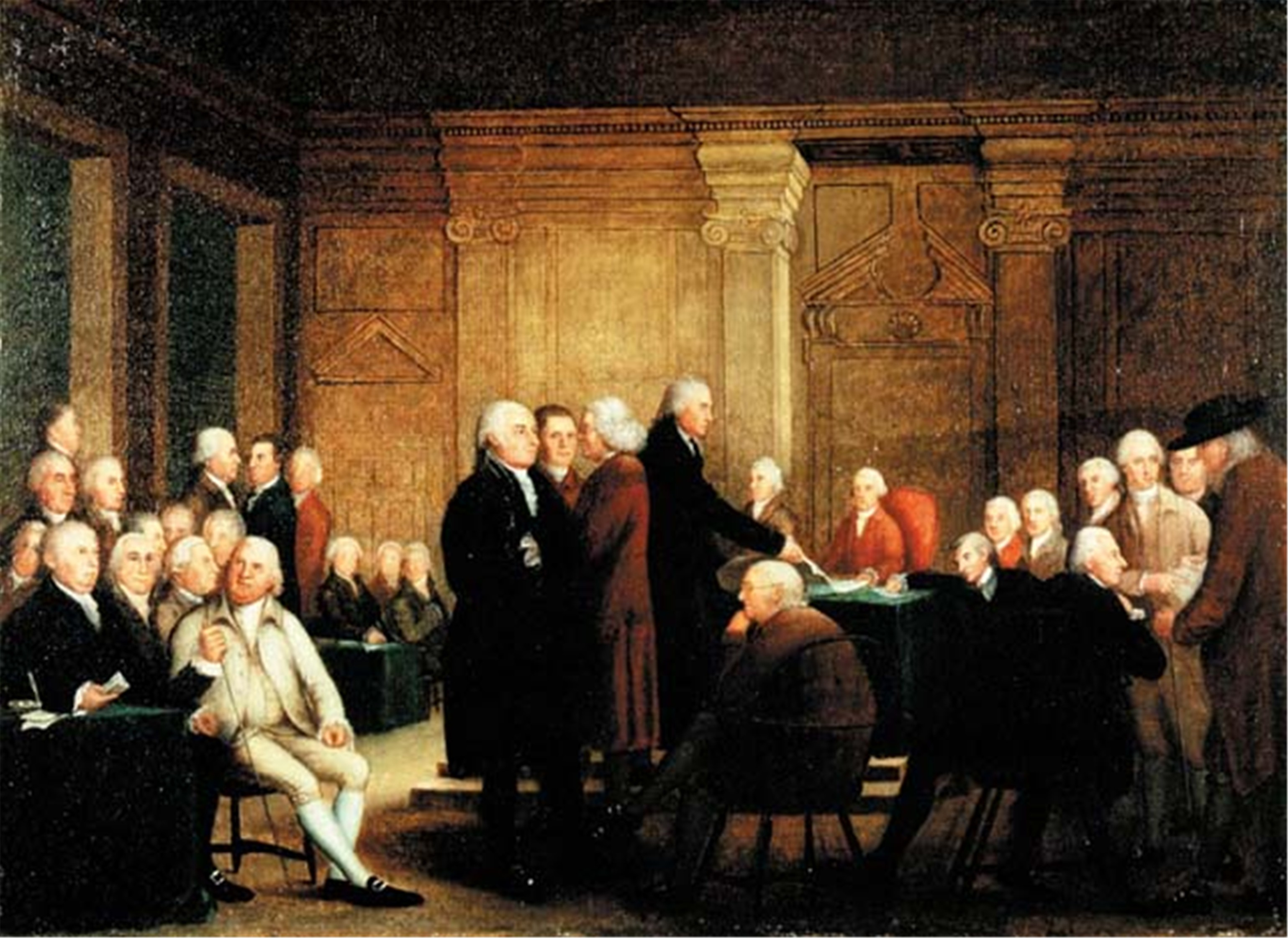
- Congress Voting Independence by Robert Edge Pine

Type
- Type: Unicameral

History
- Established: May 10, 1775
- Disbanded: March 1, 1781
- Preceded by: First Continental Congress
- Succeeded by: Congress of the Confederation

Leadership
- President of the Continental Congress: Peyton Randolph (first); Samuel Huntington (last)
- Secretary: Charles Thomson
- Seats: Variable; ~60

Meeting place
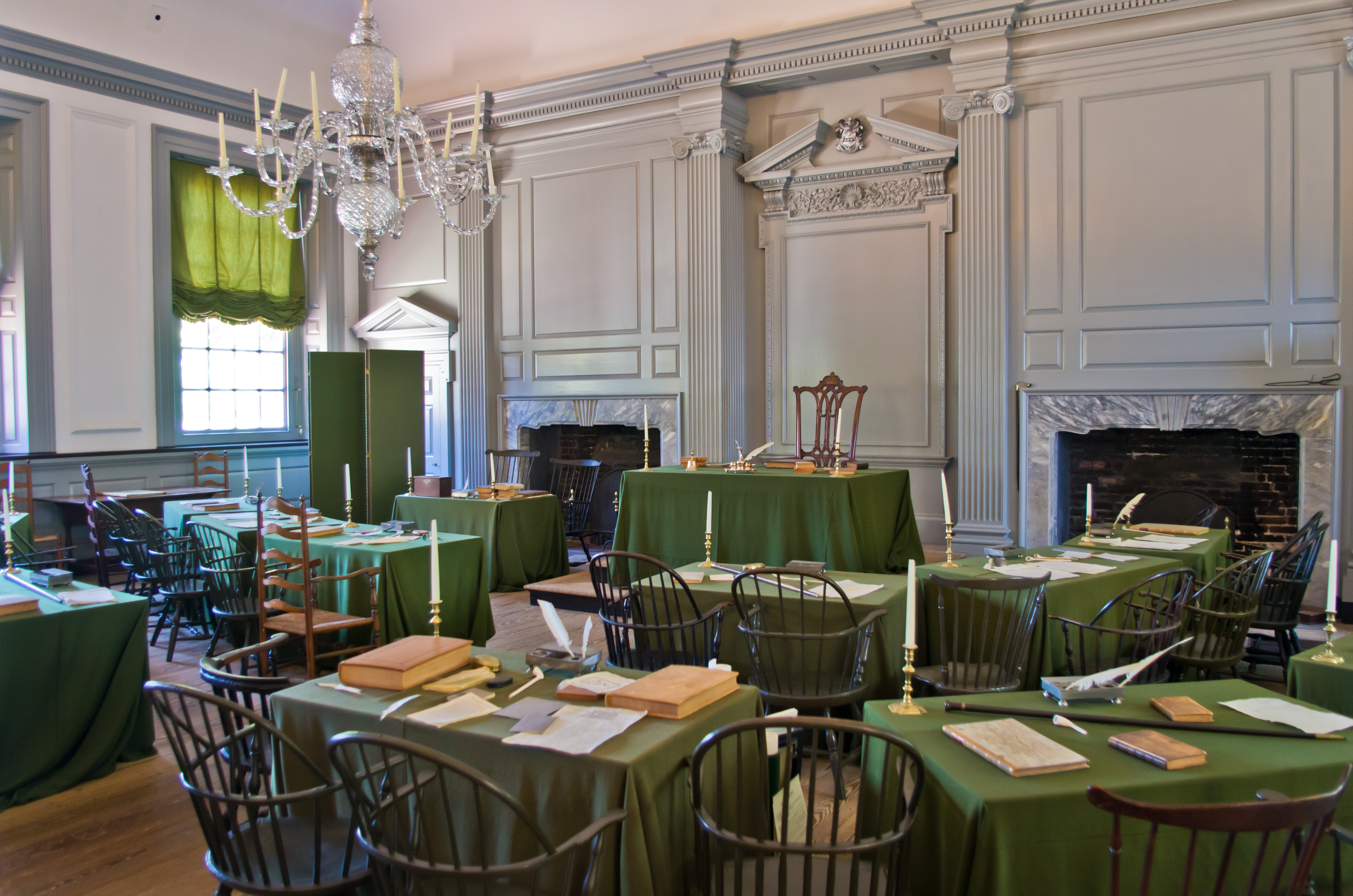
- Assembly Room, Pennsylvania State House, Philadelphia, Pennsylvania; Under exigent circumstance also met at: Henry Fite House, Baltimore, Maryland; Court House, Lancaster, Pennsylvania; Court House, York, Pennsylvania; College Hall, Philadelphia, Pennsylvania

The Second Continental Congress (1775–1781) was the meeting of delegates from the Thirteen Colonies that united in support of the American Revolution and Revolutionary War, which established American independence from Great Britain. The Congress constituted a new federation that it first named the United Colonies of North America, and in 1776, renamed the United States of America. The Congress began convening in present-day Independence Hall in Philadelphia, on May 10, 1775, with representatives from 12 of the 13 colonies, following the Battles of Lexington and Concord, the first battles of the Revolutionary War, which were fought on April 19, 1775.

The Second Continental Congress succeeded the First Continental Congress, which met from September 5 to October 26, 1774, also in Philadelphia. The Second Congress functioned as the de facto federation government at the outset of the Revolutionary War by raising militias, directing strategy, appointing diplomats, and writing petitions such as the Declaration of the Causes and Necessity of Taking Up Arms and the Olive Branch Petition. All 13 colonies were represented by the time the Congress adopted the Lee Resolution, which declared independence from Great Britain on July 2, 1776, and the Congress unanimously agreed to the Declaration of Independence two days later.

Congress functioned as the provisional government of the United States of America through March 1, 1781, when congress became what is now often called the Confederation Congress. During this period, it successfully managed the war effort, drafted the Articles of Confederation and Perpetual Union, adopted the first U.S. constitution, secured diplomatic recognition and support from foreign nations, and resolved state land claims west of the Appalachian Mountains.

Many of the delegates who attended the Second Congress had also attended the First. They again elected Peyton Randolph as president of the Congress and Charles Thomson as secretary. Notable new arrivals included Benjamin Franklin of Pennsylvania and John Hancock of Massachusetts. Within two weeks, Randolph was summoned back to Virginia to preside over the House of Burgesses; Hancock succeeded him as president, and Thomas Jefferson replaced Randolph in the Virginia delegation. The number of participating colonies also grew, as Georgia endorsed the Congress in July 1775 and adopted the continental ban on trade with Britain.

== History ==
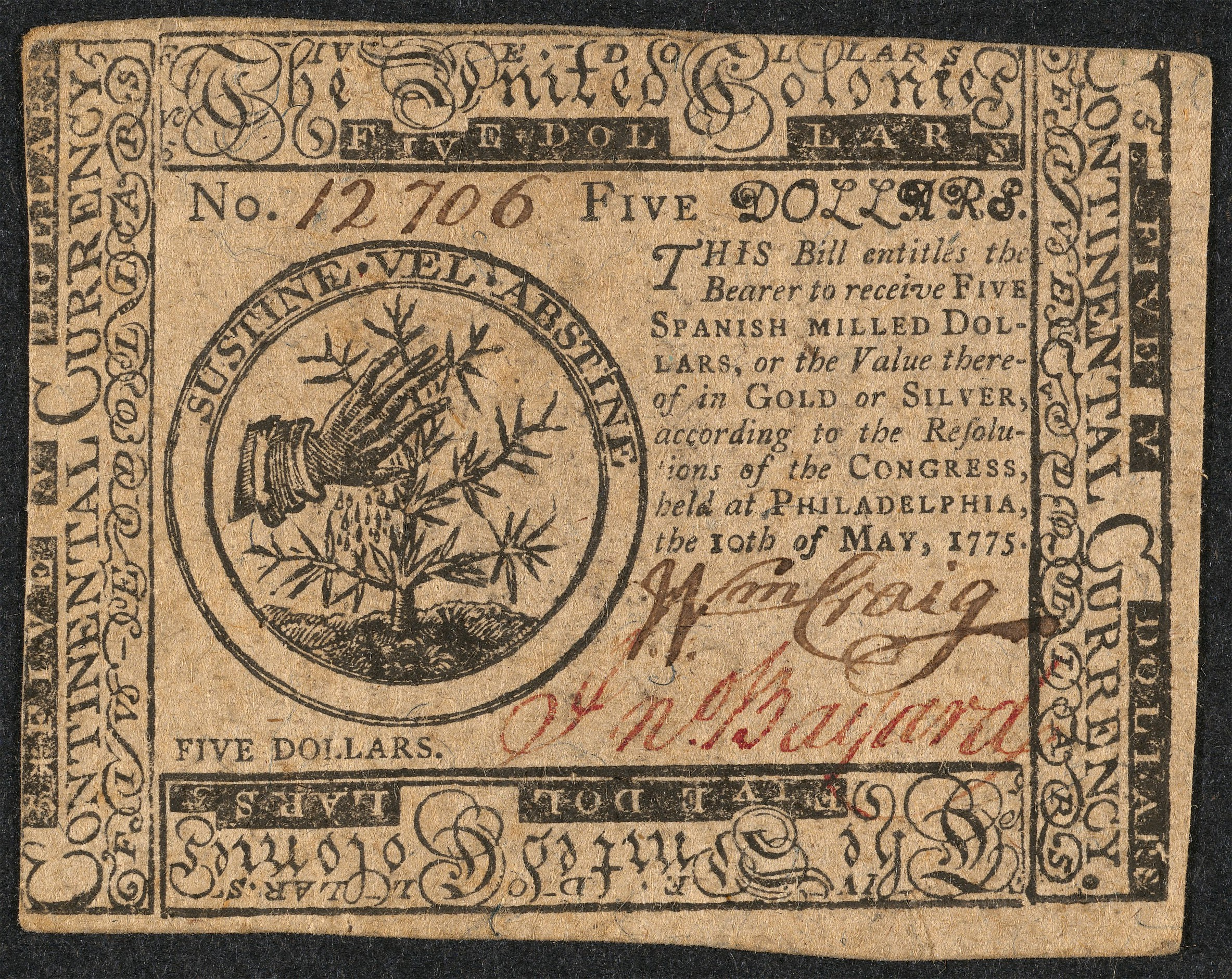
A 5-dollar banknote issued by the Second Continental Congress in 1775

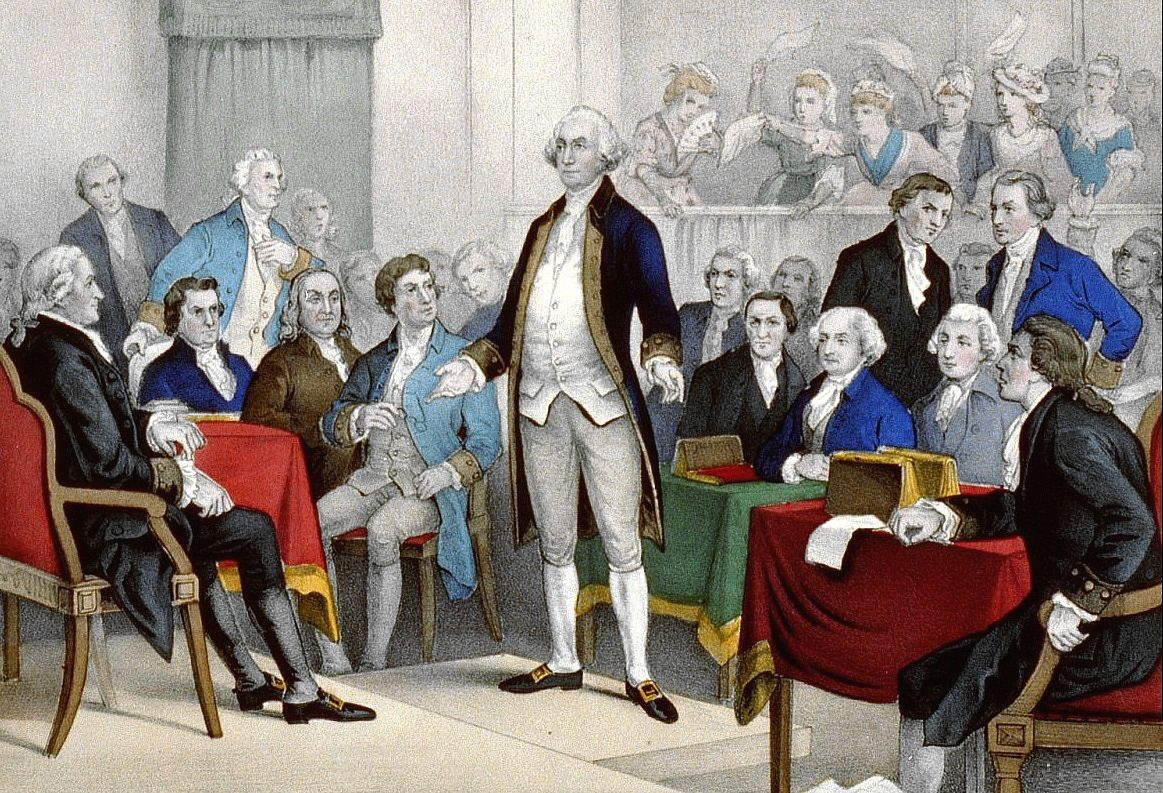
An 1876 Currier and Ives portrait of George Washington being appointed commanding general of the Continental Army

John Trumbull's 1819 painting, Declaration of Independence, depicting the Committee of Five presenting the Declaration of Independence to Congress

=== De facto government ===
The First Continental Congress had sent entreaties to King George III to stop the Intolerable Acts. They also created the Continental Association to establish a coordinated protest of these acts, boycotting British goods in protest to them. The Second Continental Congress met on May 10, 1775, to plan further responses if the British government did not repeal or modify the acts; however, the American Revolutionary War had started by that time with the Battles of Lexington and Concord, and the Congress was called upon to take charge of the war effort.

For the first few months of the Revolutionary War, the patriots carried on their struggle in a largely ad-hoc and uncoordinated manner. Even so, they had numerous successes, seizing numerous British arsenals, driving royal officials out of several colonies, and launching the Siege of Boston in order to prevent the movement by land of British troops stationed there. On June 14, 1775, the Second Continental Congress voted to create the Continental Army out of the militia units around Boston, and the next day unanimously approved a motion naming George Washington of Virginia as its commanding general.

On July 6, 1775, Congress approved a Declaration of Causes outlining the rationale and necessity for taking up arms in the Thirteen Colonies. Two days later, delegates signed the Olive Branch Petition to King George III affirming the colonies' loyalty to the crown and imploring the king to prevent further conflict. However, by the time British Colonial Secretary Lord Dartmouth received the petition, King George III had already issued a proclamation on August 23, 1775, in response to the Battle of Bunker Hill, declaring elements of Britain's continental American possessions to be in a state of what he called an "open and avowed rebellion". As a result, the king refused to receive the petition.

Georgia had not participated in the First Continental Congress and did not initially send delegates to the Second. But with the Revolutionary War escalating, the residents of St. John's Parish in present-day Liberty County sent Lyman Hall to the gathering in Philadelphia on their behalf. He participated in debates but did not vote, as he did not represent the entire colony. That changed after July 1775, when a provincial Congress decided to send delegates to the Continental Congress and to adopt a ban on trade with Britain.

The Continental Congress had no explicit legal authority from the British to govern, but it assumed all the functions of a national government, including appointing ambassadors, signing treaties, raising armies, appointing generals, obtaining loans from Europe, issuing paper money called "Continentals", and disbursing funds. Congress lacked the authority to levy taxes and was instead compelled to request funds, supplies, and troops from the individual states to sustain the war effort. These requests were frequently disregarded, highlighting the limitations of the central government under the Articles of Confederation.

Congress was moving towards declaring independence from the British Empire in 1776, but many delegates lacked the authority from their home governments to take such drastic action. Advocates of independence moved to have reluctant colonial governments revise instructions to their delegations, or even replace those governments which would not authorize independence. On May 10, 1776, Congress passed a resolution recommending that any colony with a government that was not inclined toward independence should form one that was. On May 15, they adopted a more radical preamble to this resolution, drafted by John Adams, which advised throwing off oaths of allegiance and suppressing the authority of the Crown in any colonial government that still derived its authority from the Crown. That same day, the Virginia Convention instructed its delegation in Philadelphia to propose a resolution that called for a declaration of independence, the formation of foreign alliances, and a confederation of the states. The resolution of independence was delayed for several weeks, as advocates of independence consolidated support in their home governments.

On June 7, 1776, Richard Henry Lee offered the resolution before the Congress, declaring the colonies independent. He urged Congress to resolve "to take the most effectual measures for forming foreign Alliances" and to prepare a plan of confederation for the newly independent states. Lee argued that independence was the only way to ensure a foreign alliance since no European monarchs would deal with America if they remained Britain's colonies. American leaders had rejected the divine right of kings in the New World, but recognized the necessity of proving their credibility in the Old World.

Congress formally adopted the resolution of independence, but only after creating three overlapping committees to draft the Declaration, a Model Treaty, and the Articles of Confederation. The Declaration announced the states' entry into the international system; the model treaty was designed to establish amity and commerce with other states, and the Articles of Confederation established "a firm league" among the thirteen free and independent states. These three things together constituted an international agreement to set up central institutions for conducting vital domestic and foreign affairs. Congress finally approved the resolution of independence on July 2, 1776. They next turned their attention to a formal explanation of this decision, the United States Declaration of Independence which was approved on July 4 and published soon thereafter.

=== Provisional government ===
The Congress moved to Baltimore in the winter of 1776–77 to avoid capture by British forces who were advancing on Philadelphia during the British Army's attempt to capture the city, which was then the revolutionary capital of the Thirteen Colonies. In Baltimore, the Congress met at Henry Fite's tavern, the largest building in Baltimore at the time, which provided a comfortable location of sufficient size for Congress to meet. Its site at the western edge of town was beyond easy reach of the British Royal Navy's ships should they attempt to sail up the harbor and the Patapsco River to shell the town. Congress was again forced to flee Philadelphia at the end of September 1777, as British troops seized and occupied the city; they moved to York, Pennsylvania, where they continued their work.

Congress passed the Articles of Confederation on November 15, 1777, after more than a year of debate, and sent it to the states for ratification. Approval by all 13 states was required for the establishment of the constitution. Jefferson's proposal for a Senate to represent the states and a House to represent the people was rejected, but a similar proposal was adopted later in the United States Constitution. One issue of debate was large states wanting a larger say, nullified by small states who feared tyranny. The small states prevailed, and each state was afforded one vote. Another revolved around the issue of western land claims; states without such claims wanted those with claims to yield them to Congress. As written, western land claims remained in the hands of the individual states. Congress urged the states to give their assent quickly, and most did. The first to ratify was Virginia on December 16, 1777; 12 states had ratified the Articles by February 1779, 14 months into the process. The lone holdout, Maryland, finally ratified the Articles on February 2, 1781, doing so only after Virginia relinquished its claims on land north of the Ohio River to Congress.

== List of sessions ==
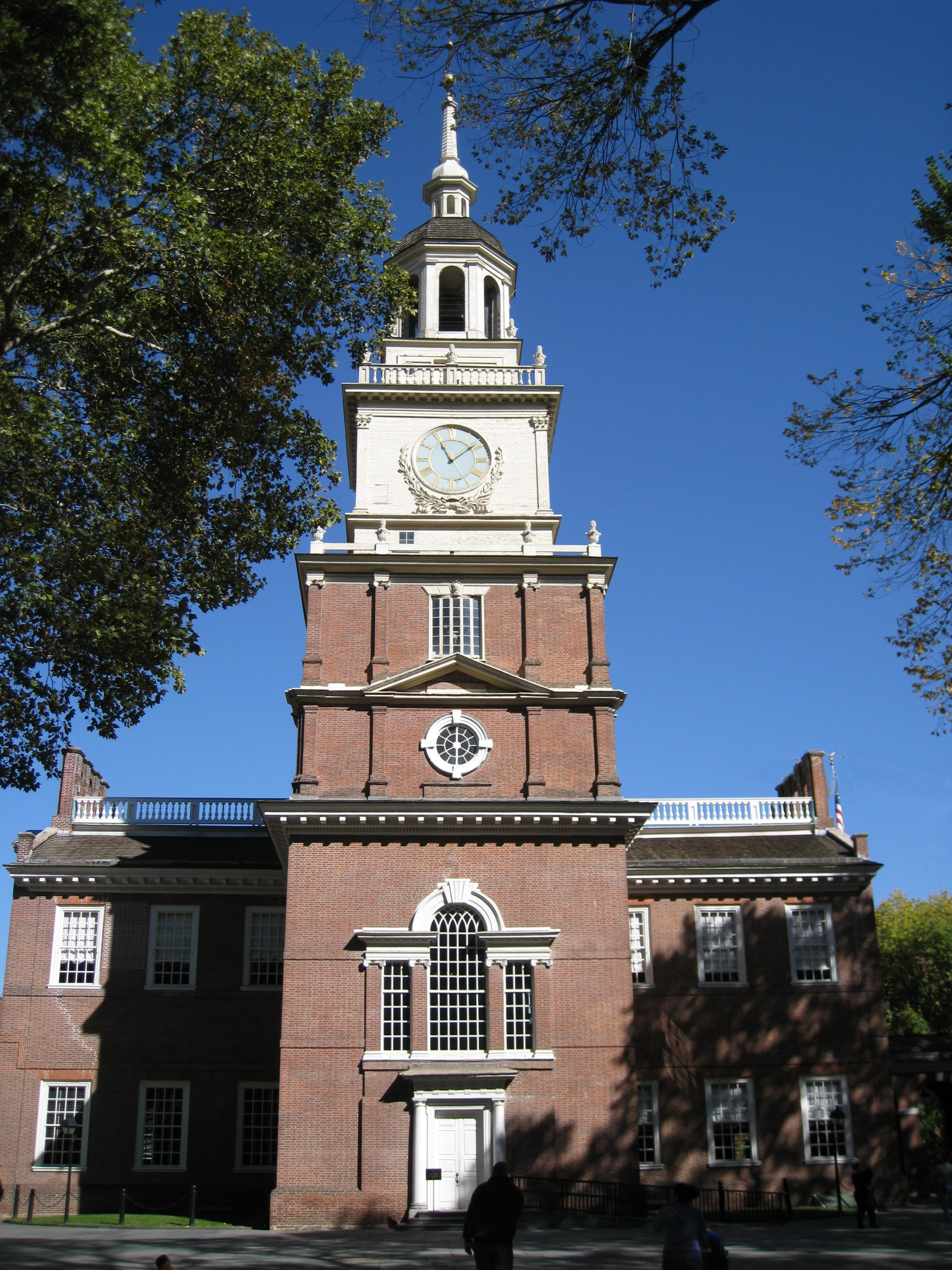
The south façade of Independence Hall, initially known as the Pennsylvania Statehouse, in Philadelphia, the principal meeting site of the Second Continental Congress

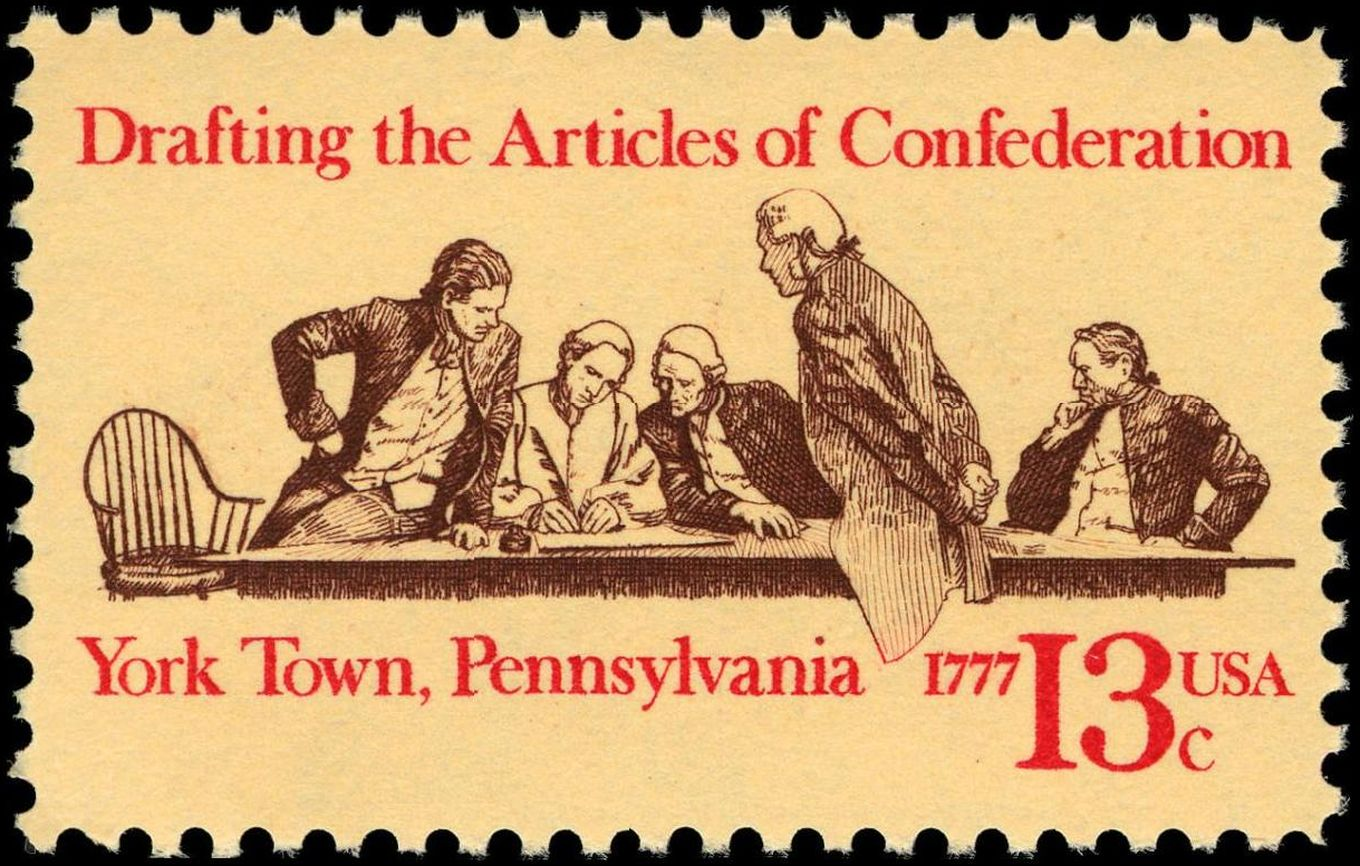
A 1977 13-cent U.S. postage stamp commemorating the Articles of Confederation bicentennial; the draft was completed in York, Pennsylvania on November 15, 1777

May 10, 1775 – December 12, 1776
Location:	Pennsylvania State House, Philadelphia, Pennsylvania
President:	Peyton Randolph (until May 24, 1775); John Hancock (from May 24, 1775)

December 20, 1776 – February 27, 1777
Location:	Henry Fite House, Baltimore, Maryland
President:	John Hancock

March 5, 1777 – September 18, 1777
Location:	Pennsylvania State House, Philadelphia, Pennsylvania
President:	John Hancock

September 27, 1777
Location:	Court House, Lancaster, Pennsylvania
President:	John Hancock

September 30, 1777 – June 27, 1778
Location:	Court House, York, Pennsylvania
President:	John Hancock (until October 29, 1777); Henry Laurens (from November 1, 1777)

July 2, 1778 – July 20, 1778
Location:	College Hall, Philadelphia
President:	Henry Laurens

July 21, 1778 – March 1, 1781
Location:	Pennsylvania State House, Philadelphia, Pennsylvania
President:	Henry Laurens (until December 9, 1778); John Jay (from December 10, 1778, until September 28, 1779); Samuel Huntington (from September 28, 1779)

== See also ==
- American Revolutionary War#Prelude to revolution
- Founding Fathers of the United States
- History of the United States (1776–1789)
- List of delegates to the Continental Congress
- Memorial to the 56 Signers of the Declaration of Independence
- State cessions
- Timeline of the American Revolution
- United Colonies

Preceded by First Continental Congress	Second Continental Congress; May 10, 1775 – March 1, 1781	Succeeded by Congress of the Confederation
