= Declaration of the Causes and Necessity of Taking Up Arms =

1775 resolution of the US Continental Congress

The Declaration of the Causes and Necessity of Taking Up Arms was a Resolution adopted by the Second Continental Congress on July 6, 1775. Written by Thomas Jefferson and revised by John Dickinson, the Declaration explains why the Thirteen Colonies had taken up arms in what had become the American Revolutionary War.

== Content ==
The Declaration describes what colonists viewed as the effort of the British Parliament to extend its jurisdiction into the colonies following the Seven Years' War. Objectionable policies listed in the Declaration include taxation without representation, extended use of vice admiralty courts, the several Coercive Acts, and the Declaratory Act. The Declaration describes how the colonists had, for ten years, repeatedly petitioned for the redress of their grievances, only to have their pleas ignored or rejected. Although British troops had been dispatched to enforce what the colonists viewed as unconstitutional acts, the Declaration asserted that the colonists did not yet seek independence from the mother country. They have taken up arms "in defense of the Freedom that is our Birthright and which we ever enjoyed until the late Violation of it", and will "lay them down when hostilities shall cease on the part of the Aggressors".

The opening paragraph likens the colonies as being enslaved to the Legislature of Great Britain by violence, against its own constitution, and gives that as the reason for the colonies taking up arms:

The Legislature of Great Britain, however, stimulated by an inordinate passion for power, not only unjustifiable, but which they know to be peculiarly reprobated by the very Constitution of that Kingdom, and desperate of success in any mode of contest where regard should be had to the truth, law, or right, have at length, deserting those, attempted to effect their cruel and impolitic purpose of enslaving these Colonies by violence, and have thereby rendered it necessary for us to close with their last appeal from reason to arms.

== Authorship ==
In the 19th century, the authorship of the Declaration was disputed. In a collection of his works first published in 1801, John Dickinson took credit for writing the Declaration. This claim went unchallenged by Thomas Jefferson until many years later when Jefferson was nearly 80 years old. In his autobiography, Jefferson claimed that he wrote the first draft, but Dickinson objected that it was too radical, and so Congress allowed Dickinson to write a more moderate version, keeping only the last four-and-a-half paragraphs of Jefferson's draft. Jefferson's version of events was accepted by historians for many years. In 1950, Julian P. Boyd, the editor of Jefferson's papers, examined the extant drafts and determined that Jefferson's memory was faulty and that Dickinson claimed too much credit for the final text.

According to Boyd, an initial draft was reportedly written by John Rutledge, a member of a committee of five appointed to create the Declaration. Rutledge's draft was not accepted and does not survive. Jefferson and Dickinson were then added to the committee. Jefferson was appointed to write a draft; how much he drew upon the lost Rutledge draft, if at all, is unknown. Jefferson then apparently submitted his draft to Dickinson, who suggested some changes, which Jefferson, for the most part, decided not to use. The result was that Dickinson rewrote the Declaration, keeping some passages written by Jefferson. Contrary to Jefferson's recollection in his old age, Dickinson's version was not less radical; according to Boyd, in some respects, Dickinson's draft was blunter. The bold statement near the end was written by Dickinson: "Our cause is just. Our union is perfect. Our internal resources are great, and, if necessary, foreign assistance is undoubtedly attainable." The disagreement in 1775 between Dickinson and Jefferson appears to have been primarily a matter of style rather than content.

== See also ==
- Journals of the Continental Congress
- Ordinance of Secession — comparable documents related to the Confederate States of America's attempted secession
