= Petition to the King =

1774 petition to George III seeking repeal of the Intolerable Acts

1774 Petition to the King
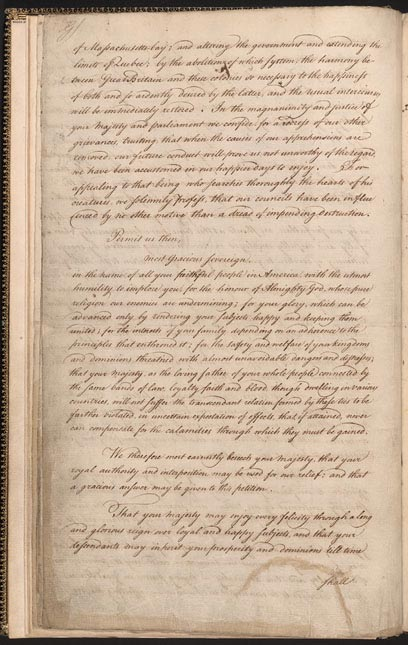
- Created: October 1774
- Ratified: 25 October 1774
- Location: Engrossed copy: Library of Congress
- Author: John Dickinson et al.
- Signatories: 51 delegates to the Continental Congress
- Purpose: Avoiding war between Great Britain and the Thirteen Colonies

The Petition to the King was a petition sent to King George III by the First Continental Congress in 1774, calling for the repeal of the Intolerable Acts. The King's rejection of the petition was one of the causes of the later United States Declaration of Independence and American Revolutionary War. The Continental Congress had hoped to resolve conflict without a war. The Congress did not send a petition to the British Parliament, a deliberate omission since they did not acknowledge Parliament's authority.

== Political background ==
Following the end of the French and Indian War (the North American theater of the Seven Years' War) in 1763, relations between the Thirteen Colonies and Britain had been deteriorating. Because the war had plunged the British government deep into debt, Parliament enacted a series of measures to increase tax revenue from the colonies. These acts, such as the Stamp Act of 1765 and the Townshend Acts of 1767, were seen as legitimate means of collecting revenues to pay off the nearly two-fold increase in British debt stemming from the war.

Many colonists in the Americas, however, developed a different conception of their role within the British Empire. In particular, because the colonies were not directly represented in Parliament, colonists argued that Parliament had no right to levy taxes upon them. After colonists destroyed thousands of pounds of British-taxed tea during the Boston Tea Party, Parliament passed the Coercive Acts in 1774, punishing the colonies for their actions. These punitive Acts were vehemently opposed by the colonists, leading the newly formed Continental Congress to seek redress with King George III, in an attempt to reach a common understanding.

== Development of the document ==
=== Conception ===
Resolved unanimously, That a loyal address to his Majesty be prepared, dutifully requesting the royal attention to the grievances that alarm and distress his Majesty's faithful subjects in North-America, and entreating his Majesty's gracious interposition for the removal of such grievances, thereby to restore between Great-Britain and the colonies that harmony so necessary to the happiness of the British empire, and so ardently desired by all America.

— First Continental Congress, October 1, 1774

On 1 October 1774, in response to the deteriorating relationship between the American Colonies and Britain, the First Continental Congress decided to prepare a statement to King George III of Great Britain. The goal of the address was to persuade the King to revoke unpopular policies such as the Coercive Acts, which were imposed on the Colonies by the British Parliament. The committee appointed to prepare the Address consisted of Richard Henry Lee, John Adams, Thomas Johnson, Patrick Henry, and John Rutledge, with Lee designated as the committee chairman.

Resolved, That the Committiee appointed to prepare an Address to his Majesty, be instructed to assure his Majesty, that in case the colonies shall be restored to the state they were in, at the close of the late war, by abolishing the system of laws and regulations—for raising a revenue in America—for extending the powers of Courts of Admiralty—for the trial of persons beyond sea for crimes committed in America—for affecting the colony of the Massachusetts-Bay and for altering the government and extending the limits of Canada, the jealousies which have been occasioned by such acts and regulations of Parliament, will be removed and commerce again restored.

— First Continental Congress, October 5, 1774

On 5 October 1774, Congress once more returned to the subject of the Address, stressing to the committee that the document should assure the King that following the successful repeal of the Coercive Acts, the Colonies would restore favorable relations with Britain.

=== Approval by Congress ===
The Congress resumed the consideration of the address to his Majesty, and the same being debated by paragraphs, was, after some amendments, approved and ordered to be engrossed.

Resolved, That the address to the King be enclosed in a letter to the several colony Agents, in order that the same may be by them presented to his Majesty; and that the Agents be requested to call in the aid of such Noblemen and gentlemen as are esteemed firm friends to American liberty.

— First Continental Congress, October 25, 1774

On 25 October 1774, the petition came before Congress in its draft form. After the document was debated over and formally amended, it was then approved to be engrossed and sent to England to be presented to the King.

== Annotated text of the petition ==
The petition, when written, was not divided into formal parts. However, the structure of the document allows it to be classified into sections, including an introduction, the list of grievances, reasons for attention, and a conclusion.

Introduction States the represented Colonies, as well as the nature of the document.	To the King's Most Excellent Majesty: Most Gracious Sovereign: We, your Majesty's faithful subjects of the Colonies of New-Hampshire, Massachusetts Bay, Rhode-Island and Providence Plantations, Connecticut, New-York, New-Jersey, Pennsylvania, the Counties of New-Castle, Kent, and Sussex, on Delaware, Maryland, Virginia, North Carolina, and South Carolina, in behalf of ourselves and the inhabitants of those Colonies who have deputed us to represent them in General Congress, by this our humble Petition, beg leave to lay our Grievances before the Throne.
List of Grievances Lists the grievances that the Colonies wish for King George III to redress.	A Standing Army has been kept in these Colonies ever since the conclusion of the late war, without the consent of our Assemblies; and this Army, with a considerable Naval armament, has been employed to enforce the collection of Taxes. The authority of the Commander-in-Chief, and under him of the Brigadiers General has, in time of peace, been rendered supreme in all the Civil Governments in America. The Commander-in-chief of all your Majesty's Forces in North America, has, in time of peace, been appointed Governour of a Colony. The charges of usual offices have been greatly increased; and new, expensive, and oppressive offices have been multiplied. The Judges of Admiralty and Vice Admiralty Courts are empowered to receive their salaries and fees from the effects condemned by themselves. The Officers of the Customs are empowered to break open and enter houses, without the authority of any Civil Magistrate, founded on legal information. The Judges of Courts of Common Law have been made entirely dependent on one part of the Legislature for their salaries, as well as for the duration of their commissions. Counsellors, holding their commissions during pleasure, exercise Legislative authority. Humble and reasonable Petitions from the Representatives of the People, have been fruitless. The Agents of the People have been discountenanced, and Governours have been instructed to prevent the payment of their salaries. Assemblies have been repeatedly and injuriously dissolved. Commerce has been burthened with many useless and oppressive restrictions. By several Acts of Parliament made in the fourth, fifth, sixth, seventh, and eighth years of your Majesty's Reign, Duties are imposed on us for the purpose of raising a Revenue; and the powers of Admiralty and Vice Admiralty Courts are extended beyond their ancient limits, whereby our property is taken from us without our consent; the trial by jury, in many civil cases, is abolished; enormous forfeitures are incurred for slight offences; vexatious informers are exempted from paying damages, to which they are justly liable, and oppressive security is required from owners before they are allowed to defend their right. Both Houses of Parliament have resolved, that Colonists may be tried in England for offences alleged to have been committed in America, by virtue of a Statute passed in the thirty-fifth year of Henry the Eighth, and, in consequence thereof, attempts have been made to enforce that Statute. A Statute was passed in the twelfth year of your Majesty's Reign, directing that persons charged with committing any offence therein described, in any place out of the Realm, may be indicted and tried for the same in any Shire or County within the Realm, whereby the inhabitants of these Colonies may, in sundry cases, by that Statute made capital, be deprived of a trial by their peers of the vicinage. In the last sessions of Parliament an Act was passed for blocking up the Harbour of Boston; another empowering the Governour of the Massachusetts Bay to send persons indicted for murder in that Province, to another Colony, or even to Great Britain, for trial, whereby such offenders may escape legal punishment; a third for altering the chartered Constitution of Government in that Province; and a fourth for extending the limits of Quebec, abolishing the English and restoring the French laws, whereby great numbers of British Freemen are subjected to the latter, and establishing an absolute Government and the Roman Catholick Religion throughout those vast regions that border on the Westerly and Northerly boundaries of the free Protestant English settlements; and a fifth, for the better providing suitable Quarters for Officers and Soldiers in his Majesty's service in North America.
Reasons for Attention State why the aforementioned grievances are important enough to warrant an address to the monarchy.	To a Sovereign, who glories in the name of Briton, the bare recital of these Acts must, we presume, justify the loyal subjects, who fly to the foot of his Throne, and implore his clemency for protection against them. From this destructive system of Colony Administration, adopted since the conclusion of the last war, have flowed those distresses, dangers, fears, and jealousies, that overwhelm your Majesty's dutiful Colonists with affliction; and we defy our most subtle and inveterate enemies to trace the unhappy differences between Great Britain and these Colonies, from an earlier period, or from other causes than we have assigned. Had they proceeded on our part from a restless levity of temper, unjust impulses of ambition, or artful suggestions of seditious persons, we should merit the opprobrious terms frequently bestowed upon us by those we revere. But so far from promoting innovations, we have only opposed them; and can be charged with no offence, unless it be one to receive injuries and be sensible of them. Had our Creator been pleased to give us existence in a land of slavery, the sense of our condition might have been mitigated by ignorance and habit. But, thanks be to his adorable goodness, we were born the heirs of freedom, and ever enjoyed our right under the auspices of your Royal ancestors, whose family was seated on the British Throne to rescue and secure a pious and gallant Nation from the Popery and despotism of a superstitious and inexorable tyrant. Your Majesty, we are confident, justly rejoices that your title to the Crown is thus founded on the title of your people to liberty; and, therefore, we doubt not but your royal wisdom must approve the sensibility that teaches your subjects anxiously to guard the blessing they received from Divine Providence, and thereby to prove the performance of that compact which elevated the illustrious House of Brunswick to the imperial dignity it now possesses. The apprehension of being degraded into a state of servitude, from the pre-eminent rank of English freemen, while our minds retain the strongest love of liberty, and clearly foresee the miseries preparing for us and our posterity, excites emotions in our breasts which, though we cannot describe, we should not wish to conceal. Feeling as men, and thinking as subjects, in the manner we do, silence would be disloyalty. By giving this faithful information, we do all in our power to promote the great objects of your Royal cares, the tranquillity of your Government, and the welfare of your people. Duty to your Majesty, and regard for the preservation of ourselves and our posterity, the primary obligations of nature and of society, command us to entreat your Royal attention; and, as your Majesty enjoys the signal distinction of reigning over freemen, we apprehend the language of freemen cannot be displeasing. Your Royal indignation, we hope, will rather fall on those designing and dangerous men, who, daringly interposing themselves between your Royal person and your faithful subjects, and for several years past incessantly employed to dissolve the bonds of society, by abusing your Majesty's authority, misrepresenting your American subjects, and prosecuting the most desperate and irritating projects of oppression, have at length compelled us, by the force of accumulated injuries, too severe to be any longer tolerable, to disturb your Majesty's repose by our complaints. These sentiments are extorted from hearts that much more willingly would bleed in your Majesty's service. Yet, so greatly have we been misrepresented, that a necessity has been alleged of taking our property from us without our consent, "to defray the charge of the administration of justice, the support of Civil Government, and the defence, protection, and security of the Colonies." But we beg leave to assure your Majesty that such provision has been and will be made for defraying the two first artiticles [sic], as has been and shall be judged by the Legislatures of the several Colonies just and suitable to their respective circumstances; and, for the defence, protection, and security of the Colonies, their Militias, if properly regulated, as they earnestly desire may immediately be done, would be fully sufficient, at least in times of peace; and, in case of war, your faithful Colonists will be ready and willing, as they ever have been, when constitutionally required, to demonstrate their loyalty to your Majesty, by exerting their most strenuous efforts in granting supplies and raising forces. Yielding to no British subjects in affectionate attachment to your Majesty's person, family, and Government, we too dearly prize the privilege of expressing that attachment by those proofs that are honourable to the Prince who receives them, and to the People who give them, ever to resign it to any body of men upon earth. Had we been permitted to enjoy, in quiet, the inheritance left us by our forefathers, we should, at this time, have been peaceably, cheerfully, and usefully employed in recommending ourselves, by every testimony of devotion, to your Majesty, and of veneration to the state, from which we derive our origin. But though now exposed to unexpected and unnatural scenes of distress by a contention with that Nation in whose parental guidance on all important affairs, we have hitherto, with filial reverence, constantly trusted, and therefore can derive no instruction in our present unhappy and perplexing circumstances from any former experience; yet, we doubt not, the purity of our intention, and the integrity of our conduct, will justify us at that grand tribunal before which all mankind must submit to judgment. We ask but for Peace, Liberty, and Safety. We wish not a diminution of the prerogative, nor do we solicit the grant of any new right in our favour. Your Royal authority over us, and our connection with Great Britain, we shall always carefully and zealously endeavour to support and maintain.
Conclusion Restates the ultimate goal of the petition, while reaffirming the Colonies' loyalty to the British monarchy.	Filled with sentiments of duty to your Majesty, and of affection to our parent state, deeply impressed by our education, and strongly confirmed by our reason, and anxious to evince the sincerity of these dispositions, we present this Petition only to obtain redress of Grievances, and relief from fears and jealousies, occasioned by the system of Statutes and Regulations adopted since the close of the late war, for raising a Revenue in America—extending the powers of Courts of Admiralty and Vice Admiralty—trying persons in Great Britain for offences alleged to be committed in America—affecting the Province of Massachusetts Bay—and altering the Government and extending the limits of Quebec; by the abolition of which system the harmony between Great Britain and these Colonies, so necessary to the happiness of both, and so ardently desired by the latter, and the usual intercourses will be immediately restored. In the magnanimity and justice of your Majesty and Parliament we confide for a redress of our other grievances, trusting, that, when the causes of our apprehensions are removed, our future conduct will prove us not unworthy of the regard we have been accustomed in our happier days to enjoy. For, appealing to that Being, who searches thoroughly the hearts of his creatures, we solemnly profess, that our Councils have been influenced by no other motive than a dread of impending destruction. Permit us then, most gracious Sovereign, in the name of all your faithful People in America, with the utmost humility, to implore you, for the honour of Almighty God, whose pure Religion our enemies are undermining; for your glory, which can be advanced only by rendering your subjects happy, and keeping them united; for the interests of your family depending on an adherence to the principles that enthroned it; for the safety and welfare of your Kingdoms and Dominions, threatened with almost unavoidable dangers and distresses, that your Majesty, as the loving Father of your whole People, connected by the same bands of Law, Loyalty, Faith, and Blood, though dwelling in various countries, will not suffer the transcendent relation formed by these ties to be farther violated, in uncertain expectation of effects, that, if attained, never can compensate for the calamities through which they must be gained. We therefore most earnestly beseech your Majesty, that your Royal authority and interposition may be used for our relief, and that a gracious Answer may be given to this Petition. That your Majesty may enjoy every felicity through a long and glorious Reign, over loyal and happy subjects, and that your descendants may inherit your prosperity and Dominions till time shall be no more, is, and always will be, our sincere and fervent prayer.
Signatures The first signature on the engrossed copy is that of Henry Middleton, the then appointed President of the Continental Congress. The fifty-one signatories who represented the Colonies (Georgia did not participate) are given, in order.	President of Congress: Henry Middleton; New-Hampshire: John Sullivan, Nathaniel Folsom; Massachusetts Bay: Thomas Cushing, Samuel Adams, John Adams, Robert Treat Paine; Rhode-Island: Stephen Hopkins, Samuel Ward; Connecticut: Eliphalet Dyer, Roger Sherman, Silas Deane; New-York: Philip Livingston, John Alsop, Isaac Low, James Duane, John Jay, William Floyd, Henry Wisner, Simon Boerum; New-Jersey: William Livingston, John De Hart, Stephen Crane, Richard Smith; Pennsylvania: Edward Biddle, Joseph Galloway, John Dickinson, John Morton, Thomas Mifflin, George Ross, Charles Humphreys; Delaware: Caesar Rodney, Thomas McKean, George Read; Maryland: Matthew Tilghman, Thomas Johnson, William Paca, Samuel Chase; Virginia: Richard Henry Lee, Patrick Henry, George Washington, Edmund Pendleton, Richard Bland, Benjamin Harrison; North-Carolina: William Hooper, Joseph Hewes, Richard Caswell; South-Carolina: Thomas Lynch, Christopher Gadsden, John Rutledge, Edward Rutledge

== Delivery of the document ==
On 2 November, the petition departed Philadelphia on board the ship Britannia, captained by W. Morwick. However, a storm forced the ship to return to port, delaying the delivery of the petition. It was later discovered that the paper was unfit to be presented. The second copy left port on 6 November on board the ship Mary and Elizabeth, captained by N. Falconer. It was confirmed on 14 December that the document successfully arrived in London.

In Britain, a number of London merchants expressed interest in joining the Americans when the petition was presented, although Benjamin Franklin advised against the proposition. On 21 December, Benjamin Franklin, Lee, and Bollan were notified by Lord Dartmouth that the petition was "decent and respectful" and that it would be presented as soon as possible to the Houses of Parliament. However, Franklin wrote two days later that the petition could not be presented to Parliament until after the Christmas recess.

=== Response ===
On 19 January 1775, the petition was presented to the House of Commons by Lord North, and was also presented to the House of Lords the following day.

It came down among a great Heap of letters of Intelligence from Governors and officers in America, Newspapers, Pamphlets, Handbills, etc., from that Country, the last in the List, and was laid upon the Table with them, undistinguished by any particular Recommendation of it to the Notice of either House; and I do not find, that it has had any further notice taken of it as yet, than that it has been read as well as the other Papers.

— Benjamin Franklin, February 5, 1775

Because the petition was intermingled with many other documents, and given the increasing turmoil of the times, little attention was given to the petition by Parliament. Likewise, the King never gave the Colonies a formal reply to their petition.

== Publication ==
When the official papers of Congress were published in October and November 1774, the Petition to the King was omitted, because it was preferred that the address be read by the King before being made public. It was not until 17 or 18 January 1775 that the papers were officially released by the secretary of the Continental Congress, Founding Father Charles Thomson, for publication.

== Surviving drafts ==
Three drafts of the Petition to the King still survive: one written by Patrick Henry, one written by Richard Henry Lee, and one by John Dickinson.

=== Patrick Henry ===
The Henry draft is written with very few corrections on its four portfolio pages. Compared to the final version of the Address, the draft contains more rhetorical descriptions of the contested Acts, and focuses less on the Colonies' past loyalty to Britain.

=== Richard Henry Lee ===
The Lee draft is neatly written, with minor changes, on three portfolio pages. Compared to the Henry draft, the descriptions of the grievances were brief. It does contain, however, a harsh attack on the King's ministers, most notably Bute, Mansfield, and North. Because of the inflammatory language in this draft, it is argued that this is the version that was rejected by Congress on 21 October 1774.

=== John Dickinson ===
The Dickinson draft is a rough composition, rife with many changes, including entire paragraphs designated to be transposed. The document is nine and a half portfolio pages, numbered 1-9 and 12, with pages 10 and 11 left blank. The text found in this draft is virtually identical to the document adopted by Congress, with the main difference lying in the list of grievances in the adopted version, which resembled those found in the other two drafts.

== Historical significance ==
The Petition to the King reflected the Colonies' desire to maintain relations with Britain, given that certain demands were met. In particular, it showed that the Colonies viewed themselves as loyal to the British monarchy rather than to Parliament.

== See also ==
- Founding Fathers of the United States
- Journals of the Continental Congress
