= Edward Biddle =

American politician

- Born: 1738
- Died: September 5, 1779 (aged 40–41); Chatsworth, Baltimore County, Maryland
- Occupations: soldier, lawyer, statesman
- Spouse: Elizabeth Ross (m. 1761)
- Parent(s): William Biddle III; Mary Scull Biddle
- Relatives: See Biddle family

Edward Biddle (1738 – September 5, 1779) was an American soldier, lawyer, and statesman from Pennsylvania. He was a delegate to the Continental Congress in 1774 and 1775 and a signatory to the Continental Association, which was drafted and adopted by that Congress.

On June 6, 1761, Edward married Elizabeth Ross, the sister of George Ross. After the war, he read law in the offices of her brother. By 1767, he had been admitted to the bar, and the couple moved to Reading where he began his practice. Although the couple had no children, they both came from large families. Betsy Ross who gained fame as the seamstress of the first American flag was the wife of her nephew. He was the uncle of Congressman Richard Biddle and financier Nicholas Biddle.

== Pennsylvania Provincial Assembly ==
In 1767, Biddle began his career in the Pennsylvania Provincial Assembly as a representative for Berks County. He served there until the colonial assembly went out of business during the Revolution. While a representative, in 1768, he was elected to the American Philosophical Society. He was also a member of the rebel provincial congress and later the state General Assembly until 1778. He was a leader within that body of the Whig or radical group in the struggle to set Pennsylvania's course in the revolution.

In 1774, Pennsylvania was divided about the looming revolution. The loyalists and the supporters of the Penn family in the Assembly were joined by the Quakers who opposed any war. As a result, in July, the Assembly sent a split delegation to the Continental Congress: Joseph Galloway, Charles Humphreys, and Samuel Rhoads were all moderates, while Biddle, Thomas Mifflin, John Morton, and George Ross were radicals. That first Continental Congress produced a statement or Declaration of Rights, as well as a plan of union and pleas to King George to resolve the issues that separated the colonies from Great Britain. They also produced a renewal of the Continental Association, the non-importation agreement adopted in the wake of the Stamp Act protests. Biddle was a member of the committee that drafted the Declaration of Rights and later oversaw the printing of the resolutions the Congress had passed.

Early in 1775, Governor John Penn called the Assembly into session, intent on having Pennsylvania send its own declarations to the crown. These would be based on the Galloway Plan that had been rejected by the Continental Congress, and would try to reconcile Pennsylvania with the British government. But the legislature mirrored the growing split within the colonies. The Whigs, led by Biddle, Ross and John Dickinson won the day. Biddle was elected speaker, replacing Galloway who had held the post the previous year. The actions of the Continental Congress were approved, and a more radical delegation was named to the next Congress.

Biddle died in Chatsworth, Baltimore County, Maryland on September 5, 1779. He is buried in St. Pauls Churchyard in Baltimore.
