= Continental Association =

1774 American trade boycott with England

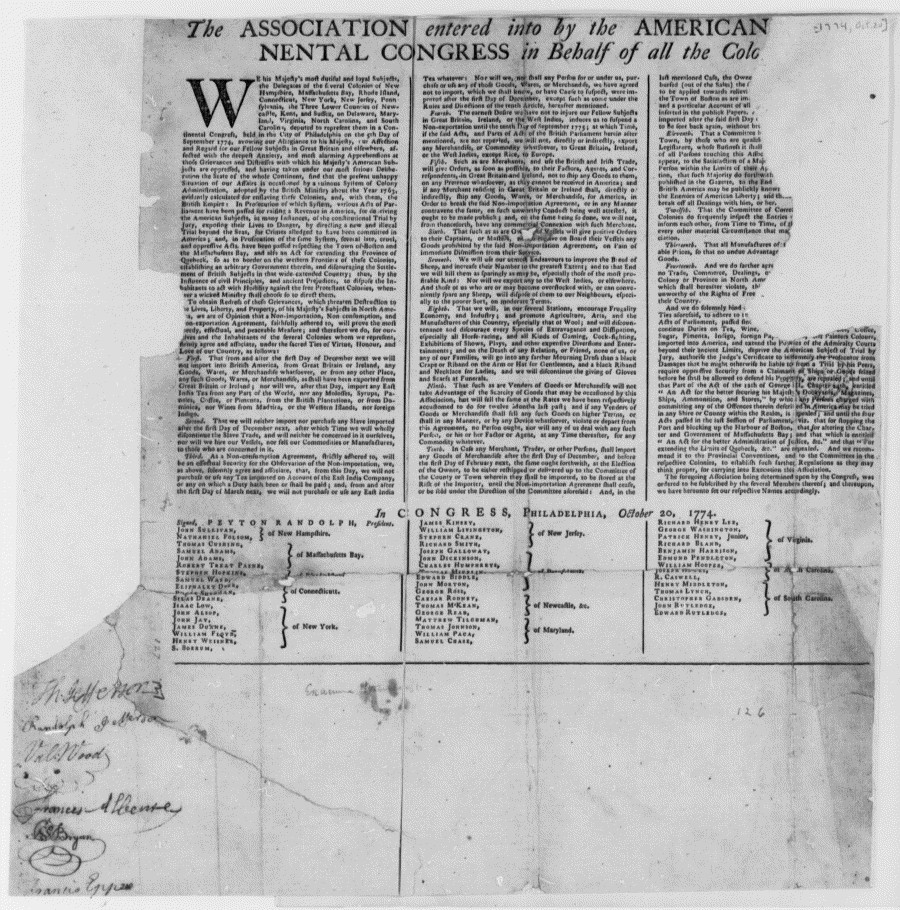
- The First Continental Congress, meeting in Philadelphia, published and signed the Continental Association on October 20, 1774; Thomas Jefferson, who was not yet a delegate to the Congress, signed this copy (on lower left)
- Created: October 20, 1774
- Date effective: December 1, 1774
- Signatories: Edward Rutledge, George Ross, Caesar Rodney, Thomas McKean, George Read, Matthew Tilghman, Thomas Johnson, William Paca, John Morton, Samuel Chase, Richard Henry Lee, George Washington, Patrick Henry, Richard Bland, Benjamin Harrison V, Edmund Pendleton, John Dickinson, Charles Humphreys, Thomas Mifflin, Edward Biddle, John Rutledge, Christopher Gadsden, Thomas Lynch, Henry Middleton, Richard Caswell, Peyton Randolph, John Sullivan, Nathaniel Folsom, Thomas Cushing, Samuel Adams, John Adams, Stephen Hopkins, Samuel Ward, Eliphalet Dyer, Roger Sherman, Silas Deane, Isaac Low, John Alsop, John Jay, James Duane, Philip Livingston, William Floyd, Henry Wisner, Simon Boerum, James Kinsey, Robert Treat Paine, William Livingston, Stephen Crane, Richard Smith, John De Hart, Joseph Galloway, Joseph Hewes, William Hooper

Full text
- Continental Association at Wikisource

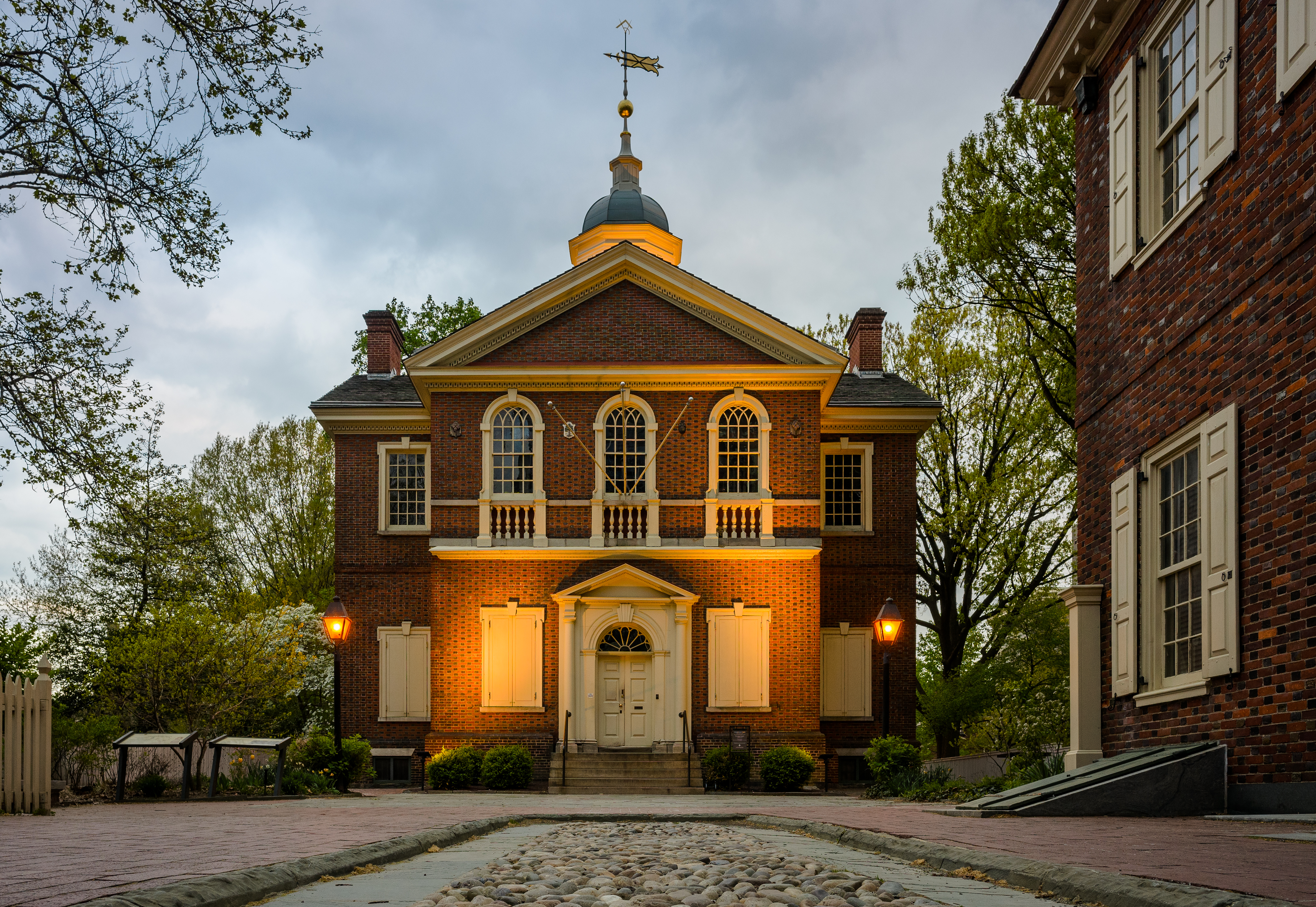
Carpenter's Hall in Philadelphia, where the First Continental Congress passed the Continental Association on October 20, 1774

The Continental Association, also known as the Articles of Association or simply the Association, was an agreement among the North American colonies, adopted by the First Continental Congress, which met inside Carpenters' Hall in Philadelphia on October 20, 1774. It was a result of the escalating American Revolution, and called for a trade boycott against British merchants by the colonies. Congress hoped that placing economic sanctions on British imports and exports would pressure Parliament into addressing the colonies' grievances, especially repealing the Intolerable Acts, which were strongly opposed by the colonies.

The Congress adopted a "non-importation, non-consumption, non-exportation" agreement as a peaceful means of settling the colonies' disputes with Great Britain. The agreement, which had been suggested by Virginia delegate Richard Henry Lee based on the 1769 Virginia Association initiated by George Washington and written by George Mason, opened with a pledge of loyalty to King George III of Britain, and went on to outline a series of actions opening with a ban on British imports that would begin December 1, 1774. Trade between the colonies and Britain subsequently fell sharply. The British soon responded with the New England Restraining Act which escalated their own economic sanctions. The outbreak of the American Revolutionary War in April 1775 superseded the need to boycott British goods.

A significant effect of the agreement was that it exhibited the colonies' collective will to act together in their common interests. Abraham Lincoln, in his first inaugural address in 1861, credited the origin of the union which would become the United States to the adoption of the Continental Association. The Union actually may have begun slightly earlier with the First Continental Congress's opening session on September 5, 1774, and from that date on, the colonies acted in accord on a series of agreements leading up to the Congress's closing session seven weeks later. One of the last of these agreements, the most visible symbol of political unity among the colonies up to that time, was the adoption of the Continental Association.

== Background ==
Parliament passed the Coercive Acts in 1774 to restructure the colonial administration of the Thirteen Colonies and to punish the Province of Massachusetts for the Boston Tea Party. A First Continental Congress was convened at Carpenters' Hall in Philadelphia on September 5, 1774, to coordinate a response to the Coercive Acts, which they termed the Intolerable Acts. Twelve colonies were represented at the First Continental Congress, which included George Washington, John Adams, Samuel Adams, Patrick Henry and future chief justice John Jay. Peyton Randolph was unanimously elected as its president, and Charles Thomson elected secretary. A plan of reconciliation was proposed, but was roundly rejected for concern that Parliament would see the proposal as a colonial acknowledgment that it had the right to regulate colonial trade and impose taxes.

Many Americans saw the Coercive Acts as a violation of the British Constitution and a threat to the liberties of all Thirteen Colonies, not just Massachusetts, and they turned to economic boycotts to protest the oppressive legislation, which involved the "non-importation", "nonexportation", or "non-consumption" of British goods.

On May 13, 1774, the Boston Town Meeting passed a resolution, with Samuel Adams acting as moderator, which called for an economic boycott in response to the Boston Port Act, one of the Coercive Acts. The resolution said:

That it is the opinion of this town, that if the other, Colonies come, into a joint resolution to stop all importation from Great Britain, and exportations to Great Britain, and every part of the West Indies, till the Act for blocking up this harbour be repealed, the same will prove the salvation of North America and her liberties. On the other hand, if they continue their exports and imports, there is high reason to fear that fraud, power, and the most odious oppression, will rise triumphant over right, justice, social happiness, and freedom.

Paul Revere often served as messenger, and he carried the Boston resolutions to New York and Philadelphia. Adams also promoted the boycott through existing colonial committees of correspondence, which enabled leaders of each colony to keep in touch.

One of the first actions of the Congress was the endorsement of the Suffolk Resolves, which called for an embargo on British trade and urged each of the colonies to organize militias. The delegates subsequently drew up a Declaration and Resolves that included the Continental Association, which was approved on October 20, 1774. Based on the earlier Virginia Association, the Association signified the growing cooperation between the colonies. Opening with a profession of allegiance to the king, the document then charged Parliament and lower British officials for creating "a ruinous system of colony administration" rather than blaming the king. The Association alleged that this system was "evidently calculated for enslaving these colonies, and, with them, the British Empire." Twelve colonies joined at once; Georgia joined a year later.

Signed copies of the Articles were sent to the King to present to both houses of Parliament, where they remained for some time mixed in with other letters and documents sent from America.

== Provisions ==
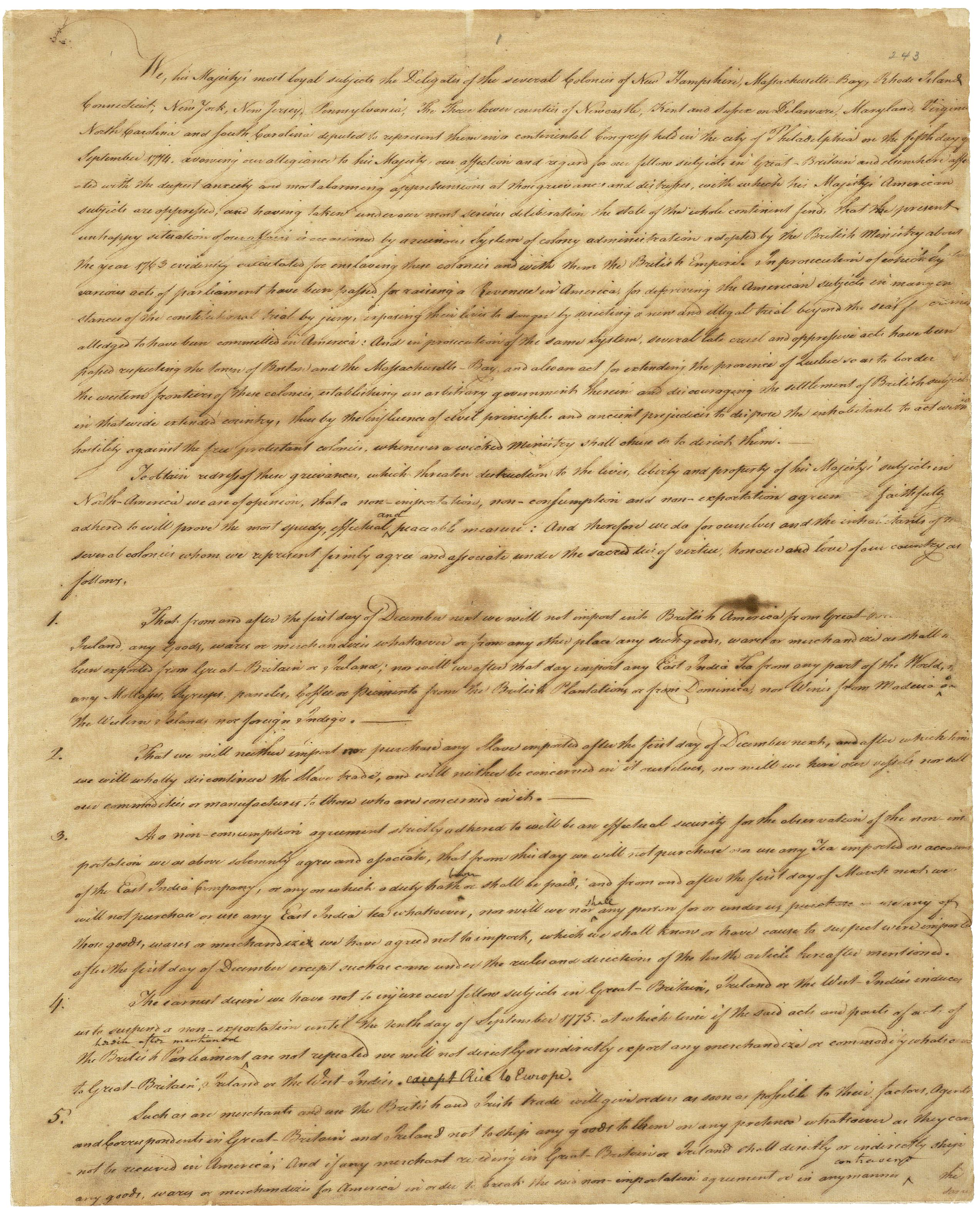
Original Articles of Association, p. 1 See also: Pages 2 and 3 For printed text of the entire document see: WikiSource

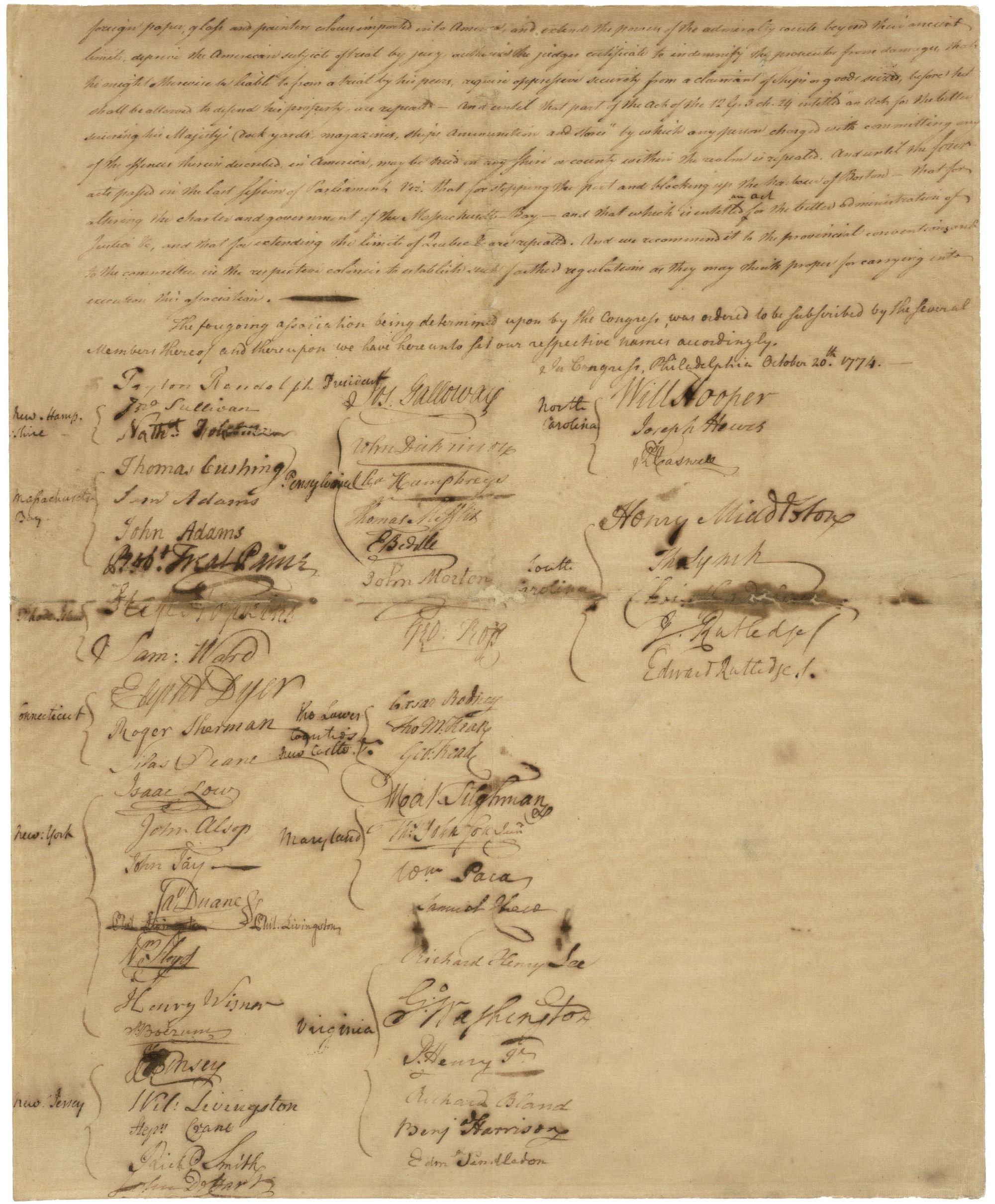
The Association's signatory page on page four

The articles of the Continental Association imposed an immediate ban on British tea, and a ban beginning on December 1, 1774, on importing or consuming any goods from Britain, Ireland, and the British West Indies. It also threatened an export ban on any products from the Thirteen Colonies to Britain, Ireland, or the West Indies, to be enacted only if the Intolerable Acts were not repealed by September 10, 1775. The Articles stated that the export ban was being suspended until this date because of the "earnest desire we have not to injure our fellow-subjects in Great-Britain, Ireland, or the West-Indies." All American merchants were to direct their agents abroad to also comply with these restrictions, as would all ship owners. Additionally, article 2 placed a ban on all ships engaged in the slave trade.

The Association set forth policies by which the colonists would endure the scarcity of goods. Merchants were restricted from price gouging. Local committees of inspection were to be established in the Thirteen Colonies which would monitor compliance. Any individual observed to violate the pledges in the Articles would be condemned in print and ostracised in society "as the enemies of American liberty." Colonies would also cease all trade and dealings with any other colony that failed to comply with the bans.

The colonies also pledged that they would "encourage frugality, economy, and industry, and promote agriculture, arts and the manufactures of this country, especially that of wool; and will discountenance and discourage every species of extravagance and dissipation", such as gambling, stage plays, and other frivolous entertainment. It set forth specific instructions on frugal funeral observations, pledging that no one "will go into any further mourning-dress, than a black crepe or ribbon on the arm or hat, for gentlemen, and a black ribbon and necklace for ladies, and we will discontinue the giving of gloves and scarves at funerals."

== Continental Association signers ==
The Continental Association was signed by 53 of the 56 members of the First Continental Congress. (Note: Members of the First Continental Congress who were not signers of the Continental Association were: Robert Goldsborough (Maryland), John Haring (New York), and Samuel Rhoads (Pennsylvania).)

President of Congress

1. Peyton Randolph

New Hampshire

2. John Sullivan
3. Nathaniel Folsom

Massachusetts Bay

4. Thomas Cushing
5. Samuel Adams
6. John Adams
7. Robert Treat Paine

Rhode Island

8. Stephen Hopkins
9. Samuel Ward

Connecticut

10. Eliphalet Dyer
11. Roger Sherman
12. Silas Deane

New York

13. Isaac Low
14. John Alsop
15. John Jay
16. James Duane
17. Philip Livingston
18. William Floyd
19. Henry Wisner
20. Simon Boerum

New Jersey

21. James Kinsey
22. William Livingston
23. Stephen Crane
24. Richard Smith
25. John De Hart

Pennsylvania

26. Joseph Galloway
27. John Dickinson
28. Charles Humphreys
29. Thomas Mifflin
30. Edward Biddle
31. John Morton
32. George Ross

The Lower Counties (Delaware)

33. Caesar Rodney
34. Thomas McKean
35. George Read

Maryland

36. Matthew Tilghman
37. Thomas Johnson, Jr.
38. William Paca
39. Samuel Chase

Virginia

40. Richard Henry Lee
41. George Washington
42. Patrick Henry
43. Richard Bland
44. Benjamin Harrison
45. Edmund Pendleton

North Carolina

46. William Hooper
47. Joseph Hewes
48. Richard Caswell

South Carolina

49. Henry Middleton
50. Thomas Lynch
51. Christopher Gadsden
52. John Rutledge
53. Edward Rutledge

== Enforcement ==
The Continental Association went into effect on December 1, 1774. Compliance with (and support for) the established boycott was largely enforced through local enforcement committees. By mid-1775, a large majority of Virginia's 61 counties had set up their own enforcement committees. Nearly all other colonies saw similar levels of success in upholding the boycott, with the notable exception of Georgia, where Governor James Wright emphasized the need for British protection from Native Americans.

The use of public pressure was an overwhelmingly effective tactic in enforcing support for the boycott. Those who went against the boycott or even simply criticized the Association would often find their names slandered in newspapers and town gossip, often forcing those targeted to cave to pressure and publicly apologize. The threat of more direct action also played a role in forcing merchants to comply, with one merchant in Annapolis, Maryland, choosing to burn his own ship full of imported tea rather than attempt to sell it. When enforcement could not be guaranteed, some counties enacted price ceilings to discourage smuggling.

== Effects ==
Georgia waited a year but the other twelve colonies quickly established local enforcement committees; the restrictions were dutifully enforced in the others, and trade with Britain plummeted. Breen states that by early 1775 the local committees of safety, "increasingly functioned as a revolutionary government" and British officials no longer were in control.

According to Christopher Gould, The Continental Association forced colonials to publicly take sides: Patriots signed and Loyalists did not. In South Carolina Patriots dominated in Charleston and coastal areas; Loyalists were most numerous in the backcountry. The Continental Association took charge of the boycotts and led to new governmental organizations that supervised Revolutionary activities. The South Carolina boycott made an exception for rice—it could still be exported but a fraction of sales went to purchase indigo from planters. Gould argues that the plan amounted to price stabilization and a commodity exchange program.

The King acted by securing an election and buying enough seats at £2500 to control the new Parliament. It then responded by passing the New England Restraining Act which prohibited the northeastern colonies from trading with anyone but Britain and the British West Indies, and they barred colonial ships from the North Atlantic fishing areas. These punitive measures were later extended to most of the other colonies, as well. Britain did not yield to American demands but instead tried to tighten its grip, and the conflict escalated to war. However, the long-term success of the Association was in its effective direction of collective action among the colonies and expression of their common interests.

== Legacy ==
In his first inaugural address in 1861, President Abraham Lincoln traced the origin of the union of the states to the Continental Association of 1774:

Descending from these general principles, we find the proposition that in legal contemplation the Union is perpetual confirmed by the history of the Union itself. The Union is much older than the Constitution. It was formed, in fact, by the Articles of Association in 1774. It was matured and continued by the Declaration of Independence in 1776. It was further matured, and the faith of all the then thirteen States expressly plighted and engaged that it should be perpetual, by the Articles of Confederation in 1778. And finally, in 1787, one of the declared objects for ordaining and establishing the Constitution was "to form a more perfect Union."

== See also ==
- Declaration and Resolves of the First Continental Congress
- Petition to the King
- Founding Fathers of the United States
- Journals of the Continental Congress
- United Colonies
- Constitution of the United States

== Bibliography ==
- Ammerman, David (1974). In the common cause: American response to the Coercive acts of 1774. Charlottesville : University Press of Virginia. ISBN 978-0-8139-05259.
- Breen, T.H. The marketplace of revolution: How consumer politics shaped American independence (Oxford University Press, 2004) on the background
- Breen, T.H. American Insurgents, American Patriots: The Revolution of the People (Hill and Wang, 2010) pp 160–205; the most detailed modern history. online
- Ford, Paul Leicester. “The Association of the First Congress.” Political Science Quarterly 6#4 (1891), pp. 613–624, online
- Middlekauff, Robert (2007) [1982]. The Glorius Cause. Oxford University Press. ISBN 978-0-1997-40925.
- Norton, Mary Beth. 1774: The Long Year of Revolution (Vintage, 2021).
- Schlesinger, Arthur Meier. The Colonial Merchants and the American Revolution, 1763–1776 (1917) online pp 393–606, a standard scholarly history, with extensive details on each colony.
- Ford, Worthington Chauncey; Hunt, Gaillard; Fitzpatrick, John Clement (1904). Journals of the Continental Congress, 1774–1789. Vol. II. Washington : U.S. Government Printing Office.
