= Joseph Hewes =

American Founding Father and politician (1730–1779)

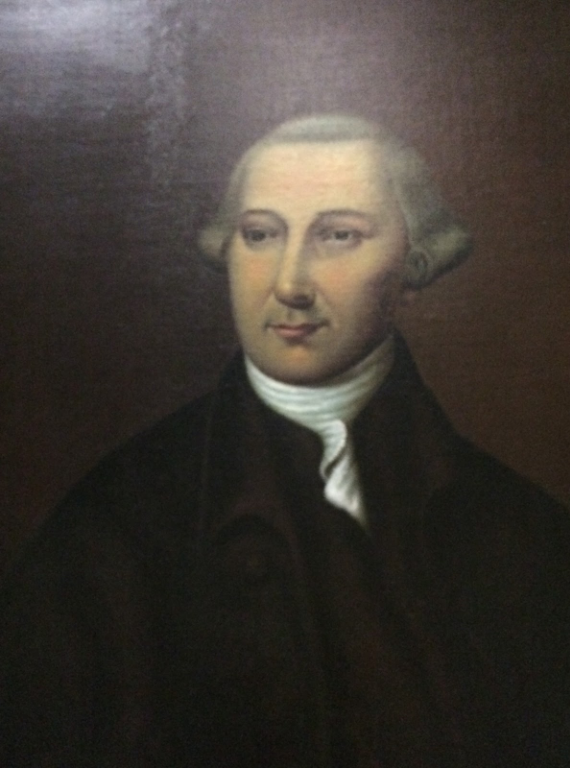
- Born: July 9, 1730; Princeton, New Jersey, British America
- Died: November 10, 1779 (aged 49); Philadelphia, Pennsylvania, U.S.
- Resting place: Christ Church Burial Ground, Philadelphia, Pennsylvania
- Known for: signer of the United States Declaration of Independence

Joseph Hewes (July 9, 1730 (Note: The Quaker records tell us that Joseph Hewes, son of Aaron and Providence, was born on the 28th day of the 4th month in 1730. Three different false dates of birth have been attributed to Joseph Hewes. The most common false date is January 23, 1730. This date first appeared in 1913 in a book by Eben Putnam. It was probably a typographical error. As a Quaker, his family's birth registry is recorded in the Quaker records of Chesterfield, New Jersey Monthly Meeting. This registry lists the names and birth dates of the children of Aaron and Providence Hewes. Joseph Hewes was born, according to the family birth registry, on 28 April 1730. This birth registry was reprinted by Putnam but the typographer inserted 23rd day for 28th day. A few lines below this the date of birth is given as January 23. These typographical errors are one source of confusion. There are two other sources of confusion. Quakers avoided use of the pagan names of the months and days of the by simply numbering them as 1st month, 2nd month,...12th month and 1st day, 2nd day,...7th day. By the old Julian Calendar March was the first month of the year. This makes 4th month equal to June. A plaque at the Chowan County Court House in Edenton, North Carolina erected by the United States Congress has the birth date of April 28, 1730 engraved on it. April is the 4th month by the modern Gregorian Calendar. June was the 4th month by the Julian Calendar. To get the correct date by the modern calendar, one must properly correlate the name of the month with the ordinal number of the month and then add 11 days to align the calendars. Thus, Joseph Hewes date of birth was July 9, 1730.)– November 10, 1779) was an American Founding Father and a signer of the Continental Association and U.S. Declaration of Independence. Hewes was a native of Princeton, New Jersey, where he was born in 1730. His parents were members of the Society of Friends, commonly known as Quakers. Early biographies of Hewes falsely claim that his parents came from Connecticut. Hewes may have attended the College of New Jersey, known today as Princeton University but there is no record of his attendance. He did, in all probability, attend the grammar school set up by the Stonybrook Quaker Meeting near Princeton.

== Mercantile business ==
About 1749 or 1750 he moved to Philadelphia and joined Joseph Ogden's mercantile business at Chestnut and 2nd Street as an apprentice. Ogden was married to Hewes's first cousin Jimima Hewes. Part of his apprenticeship had him traveling by cargo ship either with Ogden or one of his assistants known as a supercargo as they visited Boston, New York, Edenton (North Carolina), Charleston and Tortola in the British Virgin Islands to buy and sell goods to other traders in those port cities. During this time in Philadelphia, Hewes attended Quaker meetings at the Arch Street meeting house.

Completing his apprenticeship he determined that opportunities in the port in North Carolina at Edenton, a prospering well protected port town on a small bay on the north side of Albemarle Sound he had visited while still apprenticed to Ogden, offered the best chance for his success. Hewes moved there in late 1754 and with Charles Blount formed "Blount, Hewes and Co." and he soon became Edenton's leading merchant. In a 1772 letter to a friend, James Iredell said of Hewes

"there is a Gentleman in this Town, who is a very particular favourite of mine, as indeed he is of everybody, for he is one of the best and most agreeable Men in the World. His name is Mr. Hewes. He is a Merchant here and our Member for the Town; indeed the Patron and greatest honour of it. About 6-7 years ago he was within a very few days of being married to one of Mr. [Johnston's] sisters who died rather suddenly; and this unhappy Circumstance for a long time embittered every Satisfaction in Life to him. He has continued ever since unmarried...."

In 1763, "Blount, Hewes and Co.", was dissolved. Hewes joined with a local attorney, Robert Smith, to form "Hewes and Smith." In addition to the store at the NE corner of Main and King the firm possessed "offices, three warehouses, a wharf and five ships, three sloops and two brigs." Hewes was also the personal owner of a ship repair and ship building yard at the mouth of Pembroke Creek. In 1777 Hewes created a rope walk—a factory for braiding ropes, twine, hawsers and cables to be used in the rigging of ships. It became one of the main suppliers of high quality ropes and lines to the American shipping industry during the next decade.

In 1757 Hewes was appointed justice of the peace for Edenton. In 1760 he was elected to the North Carolina Assembly, where he served on important committees involving finance and treasury. He remained in the Assembly until 1775.

The Quaker historian Charles Francis Jenkins argued that Hewes remained a Quaker his entire life: "As to Joseph Hewes, who had thrown off most of the outward observances of a member of Meeting in good standing, the time has come to say whether he was or was not a Friend. The answer is that he was a birthright member of Chesterfield, N.J. Monthly Meeting, that he never resigned or was disowned, that he never formally connected himself with any other religious organization and that when he died his death was recorded in his old home meeting showing that they, at least, regarded him as one among them."

The claim that he never formally connected himself with another religious organization is contradicted by the records of St. Paul's Anglican Church in Edenton where he served as a vestryman. (Note: Joining the congregation of another church represents a de facto forfeiture of membership in the Religious Society of Friends. That Hewes was never disowned, i.e., that his membership was never involuntarily terminated, is irrelevant. In the 18th century Quakers were not permitted to maintain membership in another religious society besides the Religious Society of Friends.) There is some evidence that Hewes was a deist—someone who believes in the existence of a supreme being, specifically of a creator who does not intervene in the universe. The term is used chiefly of an intellectual movement of the 17th and 18th centuries that accepted the existence of a creator on the basis of reason but rejected belief in a supernatural deity who interacts with humankind.

Iredell wrote in his diary:

I took a Walk with Mr. Hewes to his Wharf, & spent a happy Afternoon with him afterwards at his own House - This Gentleman I greatly love & respect; & I feel much Concern that he has imbibed some Prejudices which cannot stand the Test of a fair Inquiry, & which, if justly founded, would destroy the strongest ties of Moral & Social Virtue, - would render doubtful every rule of Evidence that has been hitherto held certain, -& would leave unconquerable Difficulties in the room of those which only seem such for want of due attention or a competent Knowledge of the Subject.-As a Man & Gentleman,-possessed of an excellent Understanding, -Blest with a good heart, - Mr. Hewes is deserving all the honor & respect universally shewn him. How happy am I in being intimately connected with that Family which is admired by all the World for their improved Minds, exemplary Conduct, & agreeable Deportment!

== First Continental Congress (September 5, 1774 – October 22, 1774) ==
The British Parliament responded to the December, 1773, Boston Tea Party by passing in 1774 the Coercive Acts (known as the Intolerable Acts In the American colonies) closing the Boston harbor and restricting town meetings in Massachusetts to one per year. While the act applied only to Massachusetts, the other colonies feared their rights would soon be in jeopardy as well. Through the Committees of Correspondence a proposal was circulated for an inter-colonial congress to meet in Philadelphia in September 1774. In response to that call the North Carolina Committee of Correspondence consisting of John Harvey (the Speaker of the Assembly) Wiliam Hooper, Richard Caswell, Joseph Hewes and four others called for the Assembly to meet to select delegates to send to the Philadelphia congress. Members of the North Carolina Assembly met as an extra-legal body at New Bern on Aug 25, 1774.

The first order of business, of this First North Carolina Provincial Congress, was Joseph Hewes reading some of the letters from the Committees of Correspondence from other colonies. After this reading, it was decided to send three delegates to the Philadelphia congress. The second order of business was to pass a resolution affirming loyalty to the British crown and the British Constitution and declaring that they sought only their rights as Englishmen. The hope was that reconciliation and compromise with England would resolve all disputes. On 27 October William Hopper, Joseph Hewes and Richard Caswell were named to attend the Philadelphia Congress. The three delegates shared the belief that reconciliation was unlikely, but they also believed that only when the evidence was abundantly clear that reconciliation was unobtainable should independence become an option. The Provincial Congress gave the delegates two instructions: (1) to contend for their rights as Englishmen, and (2) to agree with the colonies to prohibit all imports and exports to Great Britain. They had no authorization to advocate or even debate a call for independence.

The Congress reconvened in Philadelphia on September 5, 1774. Hewes and Hooper arrived on the 12th and presented their credentials on 14 September. Caswell arrived three days later.

On September 18 Congress passed the Suffolk Resolves calling for the termination of trade with Great Britain. On October 15 the Congress adopted a Declaration of Rights and Grievances and on 18 October the Continental Association establishing the end of all imports from England effective on December 1, 1774, and an end to all exports to England, Ireland, and the West Indies effective September 1, 1775. The North Carolina delegation voted in favor of both measures. Congress adjourned October 22, calling for a new congress to meet on May 10, 1775, if Britain did not adequately respond to redress American grievances and restore their rights. Hooper and Caswell returned to North Carolina. Hewes stayed on until 24 November 1775.

Hewes had family in the area. His mother lived about 40 miles (64.37 km) away in New Jersey. She may have come to Philadelphia to stay with her daughter Sarah, who was married to the Philadelphia merchant Joseph Ogden. Or, she may have stayed with Hewes's younger brother Josiah, also a merchant, a member of the Philadelphia committee of correspondence, a manager of the Pennsylvania Hospital and a director of the Library Company. Hewes also had relatives just a couple of miles south of Philadelphia in Chester County.

== Second Continental Congress first session (May 10, 1775 – August 1, 1775) ==
The 2nd North Carolina Provincial Congress convened in New Bern on April 3, 1775. Hewes, Hooper and Caswell were reappointed to serve as delegates from North Carolina to the 2nd Continental Congress. Their instructions remained as they were. The delegates were not authorized to seek independence but were to seek redress of grievances. On April 29 Hewes and Caswell left together for Philadelphia. As they crossed the Potomac River into Maryland, they met the Virginia delegation led by George Washington. From then on to Philadelphia they were met at each county line by various companies of troops who marched with them to the next county line. It looked to Hewes that in comparison North Carolina lacked patriotic fervor and was far behind in military readiness. On May 11 he wrote to Samuel Johnston urging him to promote the training of the militia.

Congress convened on the 10th. Hewes was appointed to three committees: the finance committee, the committee writing the rules and regulations for the army and a committee to inquire into the ore and lead resources of the colonies. For the first three months of the Congress, the focus of attention was on the prospects for reconciliation and organizing a defensive military force These were the two messages that Hewes emphasized in his letters. One June 19, Hooper, Hewes, and Caswell sent an address to the all the county committees of safety in North Carolina urging them quickly get ready to "stem Tyranny in its commencement."

On August 1, 1775, The Continental Congress adjourned, scheduling to reassemble on September 5.

At the 3rd North Carolina Provincial Congress (Aug 20, 1775 - Sept 10, 1775) Hooper, Hewes, and Caswell were again selected to represent North Carolina as members of the Continental Congress. The Provincial Congress considered and rejected a Draft of Articles of Confederation proposed by several of the colonies . The North Carolina delegation was instructed "not to consent to any plan of Confederation" in that any such "Confederacy ought only be adopted in Case of the last necessity". The creation of a confederation was considered one step too far, turning resistance into a move toward independence.

On September 8 Caswell resigned as a delegate to the Continental Congress. John Penn was named in his place.

== Second Continental Congress, second session (August 13, 1775) ==
Congress reconvened August 13, 1775. In November, it was learned that at the end of August, the king had officially declared the colonists rebels. Late in 1775 Hewes was appointed to the Naval Board and to the Marine Committee. These committees drafted the regulations that would govern the navy and began the process of acquiring ships and the officers and men who would operate them. These acts laid the foundations for the American Navy. Hewes kept the accounts of the Naval Board, conducted the bulk of its correspondence and was responsible for getting John Paul Jones his commission in the Navy.

During the winter of 1775, Congress turned slowly towards independence. In February a resolution was proposed rejecting independence. Congress rejected the resolution. By March Hewes was beginning to think that independence was inevitable. Writing to Samuel Johnston on March 20 he said "I see no prospect of a reconciliation. Nothing is left but to fight it out."

As a practical matter, independence was declared on March 23, 1776, when Congress opened American ports to all countries except those under British control and in its declaration that British commercial shipping would be subject to attacks by American privateers and the American Navy. On April 12 North Carolina authorized its delegation to "concur...in declaring Independency...." Richard Henry Lee of Virginia offered a resolution on June 7 for independence "that these United Colonies are, and of right ought to be, free and independent States." The Lee Resolution was deferred for three weeks until July 1. On June 20 Hewes wrote to James Iredell "...On Monday the great question of independency and total separation from all political intercourse with Great Britain will come on. It will be carried, I expect, by a great majority, and then, I suppose we shall take upon us a new name...."

The Continental Congress voted to politically separate from Britain on July 2, 1776. On July 4 the wording of the Declaration of Independence was ratified. An engrossed copy to be penned by a skilled calligrapher was ordered on July 19 and most of the signatures were appended to this copy on August 2 including that of Joseph Hewes.

Between July 8 and August 2 Hewes visited his mother near Princeton, New Jersey. In a letter from Philadelphia of July 8, 1776, Hewes wrote "I had the weight of North Carolina on my shoulders within a day or two of three months. The service was too severe. I have sat some days from Six in the morning till five, and sometimes Six in the afternoon without eating or drinking. My health is bad, such close attention made it worse. ...Duty, inclination and self preservation call on me now to make a little excursion in the County to see my mother. This is a duty which I have not allowed myself to perform during almost nine months that I have been here." Towards the end of September Hewes returned to Edenton for rest and recuperation.

== John Adams and his comments on Joseph Hewes ==
In 1813 John Adams wrote of the struggles that Hewes experienced as he set about serving in the Continental Congress: "For many days the majority depended on Mr. Hewes of North Carolina. While a member one day was speaking and reading documents from all the colonies to prove that public opinion, the general sense of all, was in favor of the measure, when he came to North Carolina and produced letters and public proceedings that the majority in that colony was in favor of it, Mr. Hewes, who had hitherto constantly voted against it, started suddenly upright and lifting both hands to heaven as if he had been in a trance, cried out, "It is done and I will abide by it." I would give more for the perfect painting of the terror and horror upon the face of the old majority at that critical moment than for the best piece of Raphael. The question, however, was eluded by an immediate motion for adjournment".

Because these comments were written about 37 years after the event, there is reason to doubt the accuracy of Adams' memory. First, he is simply wrong about the vote for independence depending on Hewes' vote. Secondly, there is no evidence that Hewes changed his mind suddenly on the matter of independence.

John Adams divided the Congress into two distinct factions: the militants who strongly supported independence from the beginning of the First Congress and those who did not support independence. The Adams view oversimplifies the situation. There were actually three camps: (1) a small group of militants who early on supported independence, (2) a small group of anti-independents who never gave up hope for reconciliation and (3) the majority who gradually realized that reconciliation was impossible and so gradually came to see that a defense of their rights necessitated military operations which placed them in a state of rebellion. Hewes belonged firmly in this group, in the majority. Hewes experienced no sudden change of mind.

Hewes did not take independence lightly. There would be a human cost in pain and suffering. Yet, independence gradually came to be accepted as an inevitable consequence of their defense of American rights. Defense of these rights was of primary interest to Hewes. In April 1775, more than a year before independence was declared, Hewes was promoting more training for the North Carolina militia. His work in the organization of the navy began well before the vote on independence indicating again his willingness to support a militant defense of American rights.

== Naval affairs ==
At the end of October 1775, the Continental Congress created a seven member committee to begin fitting out two vessels one with no more than 20 guns and the other with no more than 26 guns. Hewes was appointed to this committee and to two others that became the Naval Committee which later evolved into the Marine Committee. Hewes was selected for these committees not only because of his marine experience but also for his business and accounting acumen. The following month two more vessels were ordered and the Naval Committee began adopting regulations for the conduct of Naval officers and seamen. The Naval Committee met from six in the evening sometimes to around midnight in a house they acquired for its meetings. Stephen Hopkins chaired the committee and Joseph Hewes kept its accounts as well as handling a good portion of it correspondence.

On February 14, 1776, Hewes leased one of the firm's brigantines to the Secret Marine Committee of the Continental Congress for the sum of 400 Spanish dollars per month. (Note: Corruption and graft are normal accompaniments to war. The Revolutionary War was no exception. The public was aware of corruption and except in the most egregious cases, it was tolerated. No one was surprised that merchants serving in government took advantage of their office to increase their profits. By the legal and moral standards of today this relation between shipping merchants and government would be considered absolutely corrupt. During the Revolution several members of the marine committee were privately engaged in the merchant shipping business. The level of corruption among them varied from the extreme to the minor. It appears that the firm of Hewes and Smith, while not averse to mixing their private shipping business with cargo carried under contract with the government, were closer to the minor end of the corruption continuum. They certainly maintained their profit margin throughout the war.) Hewes agreed that the "said Brigt shall be Tight, stiff, Strong & Staunch, well & sufficiently fitted, found, Victualed & Manned for this Voyage...." At the time the ship was located on the York River in Virginia where It was to load tobacco and other Virginia Produce and then sail to ports in Europe to sell the Cargo and "shall receive on board any...Goods, Wares, Merchandize arms, & ammunition that the Agent or Factors of the said Secret Committee [may order and then] proceed with all Care & dilligence [sic]..into some Safe Port or place between Connecticut and North Carolina...." The committee agreed to pay all port charges. For insurance purposes, the value of the brigantine was placed at 4 thousand 600 Spanish milled dollars. The committee insured the owners for this amount "against any Capture or seizure...by any Enemies of the said united Colonies."

== 5th North Carolina Provincial Congress ==
In November 1776 Hewes was again chosen along with Hopper and Thomas Bourke to represent North Carolina in the 2nd Continental Congress. This Provincial Congress wrote a new constitution for the province and called for the new Bicameral legislature to meet in April 1777 in New Bern. After the Provincial Congress, Hewes did not return to Philadelphia but returned to Edenton staying there through April 1777 until the General Assembly gathered on April 7.

== First North Carolina General Assembly ==
On April 7, 1777, the first First North Carolina General Assembly met in New Bern. On April 18, Joseph Hewes, John Penn, William Hooper and Thomas Burke were nominated to serve as delegates from North Carolina to the Continental Congress. John Penn was eager to obtain one of the three delegate positions for himself. He claimed that if Joseph Hewes were elected as a delegate to the Continental Congress it would be in violation of the new North Carolina Constitution. The Constitution prohibited a person from holding two offices. Hewes served on the Marine Committee so according to Penn's argument, Hewes was not eligible to serve in the Continental Congress. Penn also suggested that Hewes had amassed a fortune from his work on the Marine Committee and that he was frequently absent from meetings of the Congress. (Note: Samuel Johnston wrote to Thomas Burke on June 26, 1777 to express his low opinion of the Assembly's actions: "... the fools and knaves, who by their low Arts have worked themselves into the good graces of the populace. When I tell you that I saw with indignation such men as G-th, R-d, T-s, P-S-N, and your Collegue J. Penn, with a few others of the same stamp, principle leaders in both houses, you will not expect that any thing good or great should proceed from the counsels of men of such narrow, contracted principle, supported by the most contemptable abilities. Hewes was supplanted of his seat in Congress by the most insidious arts and glaring falsehoods, and Hooper, though no competitor appeared to oppose him, lost a great number of votes.") On May 4, John Penn, Thomas Burke and Cornelius Harnett were elected as delegates to the Continental Congress.

== Reelected to the Continental Congress ==
In January 1779 Joseph Hewes was elected to represent Edenton in the lower house of the North Carolina Assembly. In 1779 the legislature increased the size of their delegation to the Continental Congress to five members and after a two year absence from Congress, on February 4, 1779, Hewes was reelected by the Assembly to represent North Carolina to the Continental Congress. Still not feeling well, he took his seat in Philadelphia on July 22, 1779. On August 17 he wrote to Richard Caswell that "I have been much distressed with a continual head ach attended with a kind of stupor which renders me unfit for business of any kind and altho I do attend Congress yet I cannot pay that attention to business which the urgency of our affairs seem to require."

On October 25, 1779, his resignation from Congress was received by the North Carolina Assembly.

== Chowan County property tax records ==
This table is compiled from incomplete handwritten records based on information submitted by the taxpayer. Note the list of enslaved workers and the increase in the value of property and the amount of taxes paid in the years from 1777 to 1779.

| | Year | Taxable Property | Taxable Whites | Taxable Enslaved Males | Taxable Enslaved Females | Tax Paid |
|---|---|---|---|---|---|---|
| Joseph Hewes | 1768 | | Wm Scarborough, Michael Pane, Thomas Longman | Sam, Will, Tom,, Frank, Sondon, Mingo, Cuff |
| Joseph Hewes | 1769 | | Wm Scarborough, Thomas Longman | Sam, Cuff, Will, Hanibal, Cato, James, Frank Mingo Abraham | Nan |
| Joseph Hewes | 1770 | | Thomas Longman | Sam, David, Hanibal, Frank, George, Lewis, Cato |
| Joseph Hewes | 1771 | | 3 | 8 | 0 |
| Joseph Hewes | 1772 | | 3 | 9 | 1 |
| Joseph Hewes | 1777 | £5,775 | | | | £12. 0. 2 |
| Hewes and Smith | 1777 | £16,900 | | | | £35. 4. 2 |
| Joseph Hewes | 1778 | £11,690, 120 Acres Land with Houses, 2 Water Lots with Wharf, Warehouses, Stable & Hatters Shop Valued at £11,690 | | Frank £400, Gun £450 Cuff £300, Will £120 Sam £400, Hardy £500 | Toney £400 | £97. 18. 4 |
| Hewes, Smith & Allen | 1778 | £31,025 5 Lots with houses, 1 Plantation, Stock in Trade, including money, and bonds valued at £20,000 | | Charles, Anthony, Rop, Harry, Frank, Peter, Jack, Polidone, Sandy, Isaac, Deny | | £258. 10. 4 |
| Joseph Hewes | 1779 | £27,700 - 120 Acres with house and kitchen, 2 Lots in town with warehouses and Wharf, 1 lot with store, kitchen and stable, 50 acres with house | | Frank – A Cripple; Cuff – A Cripple; Gun - abt 45 years old; Will - 50+ years old; Sam - abt 35 years old; Peter- 6 months old; Sam - 4 years old | Peg – 12 years old; Teny – 25 years old; Betty – about 40 years old; Mirtitta – 3 years; old Hannah – 2 years old; Rachel – 25 years old; Joan – 4 years old; Flora – about 40 years old; Mouminy – 7 years old |

== Death ==
Joseph Hewes died on November 10, 1779, eight months short of his fiftieth birthday. The funeral was held the following day.

Dunlap and Claypoole's American Daily Advertiser printed an account of the funeral in the November 16th issue on page two:

On the 10th of November instant, Congress being informed that Mr. JOSEPH HEWES, one of the Delegates for the State of North-Carolina, died that morning and that it was proposed to inter him to morrow evening, Resolved that Congress would in a body attend the funeral to morrow evening at three o'clock, as mourners, with a crape round the left arm, and would continue in mourning for the space of one month. They further resolved, that Mr. Harnett, Mr. Sharpe and Mr. Griffin, be a Committee to superintend the funeral; and that the Rev. Mr. White, the attending Chaplin should be notified to officiate on the occasion. They also directed the committee to invite the General Assembly, the President and Supreme Executive Council of Pennsylvania, the Minister Plenipotentiary of France, and other persons of distinction in town, to attend the funeral.

Accordingly at three o'clock that evening the corpse was carried in procession to Christ Church; Mr. Carleton, Mr. Troup, Mr. Deane, Mr. Brown, Mr. Pennel and Col. Adams supported the pall. Beside the President and members of Congress as mourners, the General Assembly, a number of officers both civil and military, and a large number of inhabitants and strangers of distinction attended the funeral.

A divine service had been performed by the Rev. Mr. White, Rector of the Episcopal Churches in this city and one of the Chaplins of Congress, the corpse was interred in the cemetery adjoining that of Mr. Drayton.

Mr. Hewes, having at an early period demonstrated his zealous attachment to the cause of American Freedom, he was appointed by the voice of his fellow citizens a Delegate to the First Congress, and from that time to his death enjoyed the fullest confidence of his country. Endued with strong decisive genius and a spirit of industry, his mind was constantly employed in the business of his exalted station, until his health, much impaired by intense application, sunk beneath it. His private life was mild and amicable as his public life was honorable and useful. Adorned with all the social virtues, esteemed by his acquaintance, beloved by his friends and resigned to his fate, unregretting, tho' deeply regretted, his last debt to nature was paid in the service of his country.

Hewes was a member of Unanimity Lodge No. 7, visited in 1776, and was buried with Masonic funeral honors in the Christ Church Burial Ground, Philadelphia, Pennsylvania, the exact spot is unknown however.

== See also ==
- Memorial to the 56 Signers of the Declaration of Independence
