= James Kinsey =

American judge

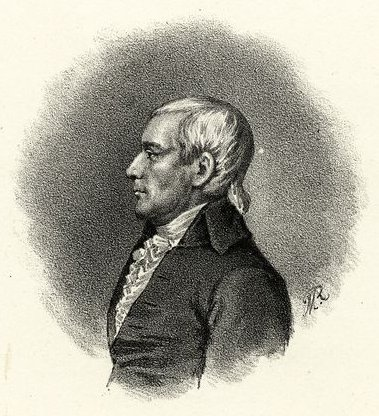
James Kinsey

James Kinsey (March 22, 1731 – January 4, 1802) was an American lawyer from Burlington, New Jersey.

Kinsey was born in Philadelphia on March 22, 1731. He was a Quaker. He attended the common schools, studied law, was admitted to the New Jersey bar in 1753 and practiced in the courts of Pennsylvania and New Jersey, with residence in Burlington County, New Jersey. He was a member of the New Jersey General Assembly from 1772 to 1775, and was a member of the committee of correspondence for Burlington County in 1774 and 1775. He was a member of the Continental Congress from July 23, 1774, until his resignation effective November 22, 1775, and was one of the signers of the Continental Association. He was appointed chief justice of the New Jersey Supreme Court on November 20, 1789, and served until his death. Kinsey also served as a Member of the New Jersey Legislative Council representing Burlington County in 1791.

He died in Burlington on January 4, 1802, and was buried at Friends Burying Ground in Burlington, Section XVII, Number 1.
