= Declaration and Resolves of the First Continental Congress =

Statement by the First Continental Congress

The Declaration and Resolves of the First Continental Congress (also known as the Declaration of Colonial Rights, or the Declaration of Rights) was a statement adopted by the First Continental Congress on October 14, 1774, in response to the Intolerable Acts passed by the British Parliament. The Declaration outlined colonial objections to the Intolerable Acts, listed a colonial bill of rights, and provided a detailed list of grievances. It was similar to the Declaration of Rights and Grievances, passed by the Stamp Act Congress a decade earlier.

The Declaration concluded with an outline of Congress's plans: to enter into a boycott of British trade (the Continental Association) until their grievances were redressed, to publish addresses to the people of Great Britain and British America, and to send a petition to the King.

== Background ==
In the wake of the Boston Tea Party, the British government instated the Coercive Acts, called the Intolerable Acts in the colonies. There were five Acts within the Intolerable Acts:

- the Boston Port Act,
- the Massachusetts Government Act,
- the Administration of Justice Act,
- the Quartering Act, and
- the Quebec Act.

These acts placed harsher legislation on the colonies, especially in Massachusetts, changed the justice system in the colonies, made colonists provide for the quartering of permanent British troops, and expanded the borders of Quebec.

The colonies became enraged at the implementation of these laws as they felt it limited their rights and freedoms. Outraged delegates from the colonies united to share their grievances in the First Continental Congress in Carpenters' Hall in Philadelphia on September 5, 1774 to determine if the colonies should, or were interested in taking action against the British. All the colonies except Georgia sent delegates to this conference. The First Continental Congress produced five resolves, one of which was the Declaration and Resolves of the First Continental Congress:

== Text of the Declaration and Resolves ==
The entire text of Declaration and Resolves can be read at Wikisource:

Text of the Declaration and Resolves of the First Continental Congress

The final resolve in this document refers to all of the intolerable acts, and states that under the Declaration and Resolves of the First Continental Congress, they are prohibited and illegal. The anger over the Intolerable Acts was no secret to the British government, and the issue of taxation without representation was voiced loudly, however this resolve questions the authority of the monarch's and parliament's rule in the colonies.

== Reactions to the Declaration and Resolves of the First Continental Congress ==
In Britain

At this time in history the colonies were perceptibly unhappy with the British monarch and parliament. Despite the palpable tensions that existed between the groups, King George did not waver or give in to colonial demands. He meant to maintain political unity between the colonies and the United Kingdom even at the expense of the happiness of the colonists. King George famously said to the Prime Minister Lord North "The die is now cast, the colonies must either submit or triumph." This sentiment continued after the publication of the Declarations and Resolves of the First Continental Congress, as he would not negotiate with them.

Reacting to the Declaration, Samuel Johnson published a pamphlet called Taxation no Tyranny, questioning the colonists' right to self-government in light of Parliamentary sovereignty in the United Kingdom, and asking "How is it that we hear the loudest yelps for liberty among the drivers of negroes?"

In the Colonies

The Declaration and Resolves of the First Continental Congress served many purposes. Among those who supported achieving full autonomy from Britain, it served to rouse their spirits together towards gaining independence. For those who were on the fence about supporting or opposing American independence, this document, which outlined all the wrongdoings of the King, could turn their support against the King. In addition, before this document was released the goal of the Continental Congress was to discuss grievances, however after the publication American opinion turned from wanting respect and recognition from the crown, to wanting to become separate from the mother country. Not all Americans felt this way, there were many loyalists who wanted to remain a part of the empire of Great Britain especially in the South, but the public opinion was turning.

== See also ==
- Journals of the Continental Congress
