= John De Hart =

American judge

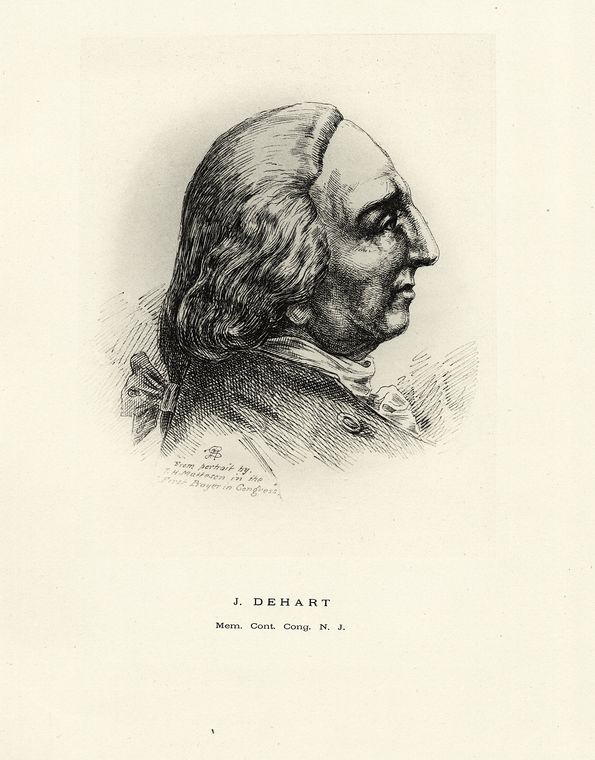
Portrait of John De Hart

John De Hart (July 25, 1727 – June 1, 1795) was an American lawyer, jurist, and politician from Elizabeth, New Jersey. He represented New Jersey as a delegate to the Continental Congress in 1774 and 1775 and signed the Continental Association.

== Biography ==
De Hart was born at Elizabethtown (since renamed as Elizabeth, New Jersey) to Jacob De Hart (1699–1777) and Abigail (Crane) De Hart. He studied law and was admitted to the bar in 1770. He married Sarah Dagworthy, and they had eight children (John, Jacob, Matthias, Stephen, Sarah, Abigail, Jane, and Louisa).

In 1774 he was named as a delegate to the First Continental Congress. While he supported the non-importation agreement and the first petition to the King, he was in favor of reconciliation. He was returned to the Second Congress in 1775, but as differences with Great Britain became more pronounced, the Congress began to adopt a harder line. Finally, on November 13, 1775, he wrote his resignation to the New Jersey General Assembly, and they accepted it on November 22.

In 1776, New Jersey began crafting an independent government. De Hart attended the convention and served on the committee that drafted the New Jersey State Constitution in June. He was appointed to serve on the New Jersey Supreme Court on September 4, 1776, but also made a living practicing law. Governor William Livingston replaced him in February 1777 for failing to attend court sessions.

De Hart's last act of public service was as Mayor of Elizabeth, New Jersey (then Elizabethtown). He was elected in November 1789 and served until his death. He died at his home in 1795 and is buried in St. John's Episcopal Churchyard in Elizabeth. The home that he built in 1766 and lived in for 29 years was called the De Hart House and stood at the intersection of Rahway Avenue and Cherry Street in Elizabeth.

His daughter Abigail married John Mayo, a prominent Virginia planter, and had a daughter, Maria D. Mayo, who was married to General Winfield Scott.
