= Taxation no Tyranny =

Political essay

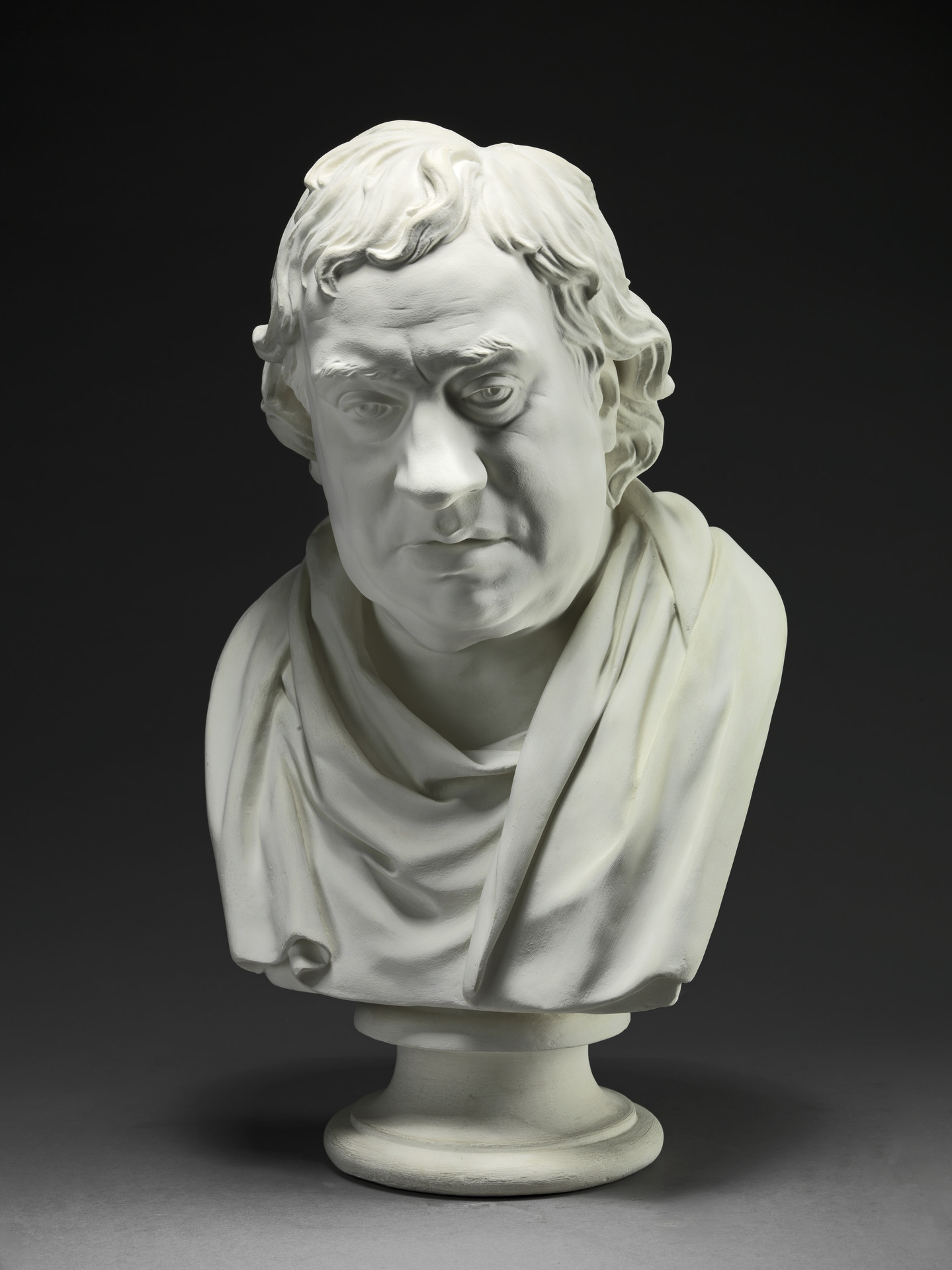
Bust of Samuel Johnson

Taxation no Tyranny is an influential essay written by Samuel Johnson in 1775 which addressed the issue of Parliamentary sovereignty in the United Kingdom in response to the Declaration and Resolves of the First Continental Congress.

Historian Gordon S. Wood noted of the essay that the "doctrine of sovereignty almost by itself compelled the imperial debate to be conducted in the most theoretical terms of political science." Johnson believed that "there must, in every society, be some power or other from which there is no appeal". As noted by Gordon Wood, this meant that for Johnson, "Such a sovereignty needed no representational justification" whereas "those zealots of anarchy" (in the 13 colonies) were promoting an effrontery that "no one had ever had".

Johnson's phrase "in sovereignty, there are no gradations" is widely quoted, and even influenced John Wesley in his "A Calm Address To Our American Colonies".

Johnson won the praise of William Searle Holdsworth for his much clearer description of Parliamentary Sovereignty than the one described by William Blackstone. Holdsworth was particularly focused on Johnson's belief that such sovereignty does not "exempt itself from question or control, and bounded only by physical necessity."

According to Bertrand Harris Bronson, Taxation no Tyranny contained Johnson's whole political theory that "legal rights are emanations, which, whether equitably or not, may be legally recalled." This is in stark contrast with the citizens of the Colonies who believed that the Rights of Englishmen were immutable. Historian A. J. Beitzinger drew parallels between Johnson's phrase of sovereignty and gradations with Royal Governor Thomas Hutchinson, who said he knew of "no line that can be drawn between the supreme authority of Parliament and the total independence of the colonies."

President John Quincy Adams considered Johnson's tract "controversial" given its expressly laid down argument that "in sovereignty, there are no gradations. That there may be limited royalty; there may be limited consulship; but there can be no limited government.", which seemed to chide American malcontents.

Still, other scholars and historians have noted Johnson's essay for its phrase "How is it that we hear the loudest yelps for liberty among the drivers of negroes?" Yale's Sterling professor of History Edmund Morgan wrote that "Virginians may have had a special appreciation of the freedom so dear to republicans, because they saw every day what life without it would be like." Some historians have juxtaposed Johnson's phrase with Edmund Burke's observation that "in Virginia and the Carolinas they have a vast multitude of slaves. Where this is the case in any part of the world, those who are free, are by far the most proud and jealous of their freedom."
