= Raleigh Tavern =

Historic commercial building in Virginia, United States

Coordinates: 37.271910°N 76.695670°W

- U.S. National Historic Landmark District – Contributing property
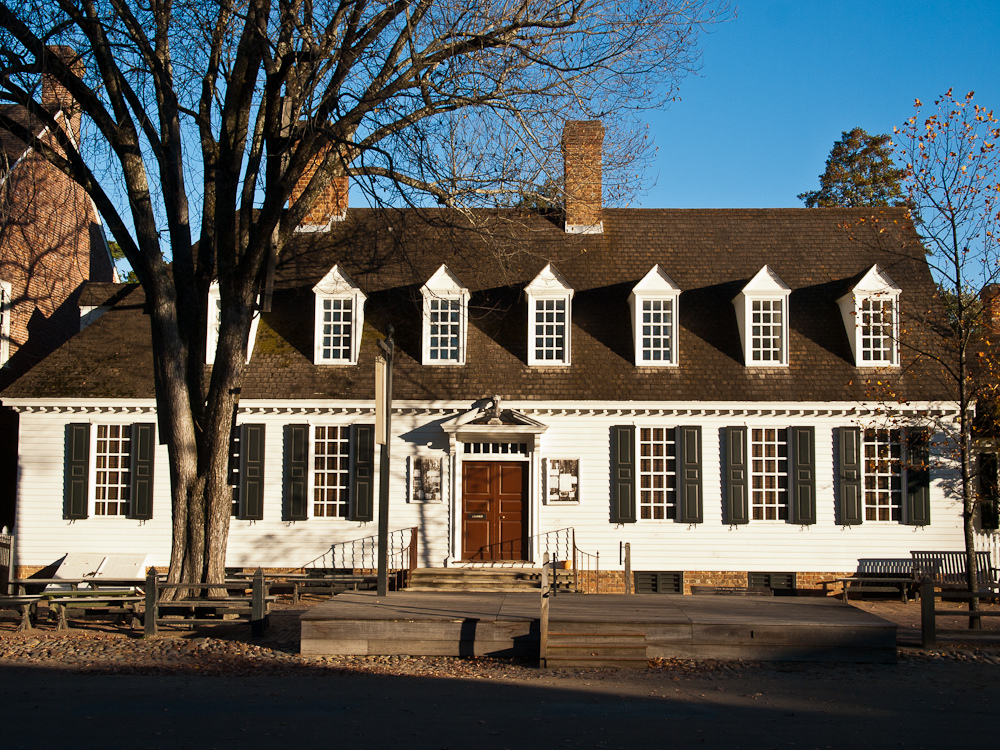
- Reconstructed Raleigh Tavern from Duke of Gloucester Street

- Location within Virginia Location within the United States
- Interactive map showing the location of Raleigh Tavern
- Location: Williamsburg, Virginia
- Built: 1930-31
- Architectural style: Colonial Revival
- Part of: Williamsburg Historic District (ID66000925)
- Added to NRHP: October 15, 1966

The Raleigh Tavern was a tavern in Williamsburg, Virginia, and was one of the largest taverns in colonial Virginia. It gained some fame in the pre-American Revolutionary War Colony of Virginia as a gathering place for legislators after several Royal Governors officially dissolved the House of Burgesses, the elected legislative body, when their actions did not suit the Crown. It was also the site of the founding of the Phi Beta Kappa Society on December 5, 1776.

Rebuilt in 1930–31, it was both the first building to be reconstructed and to be opened as part of Colonial Williamsburg. Unlike several other taverns in Williamsburg that operate as restaurants or inns, the reconstructed Raleigh Tavern building serves as a museum, showing visitors how the tavern would have appeared.

It was named after Sir Walter Raleigh, an important figure in the English settlement of Virginia. A lead bust of Raleigh sat above the entrance door.

== History ==
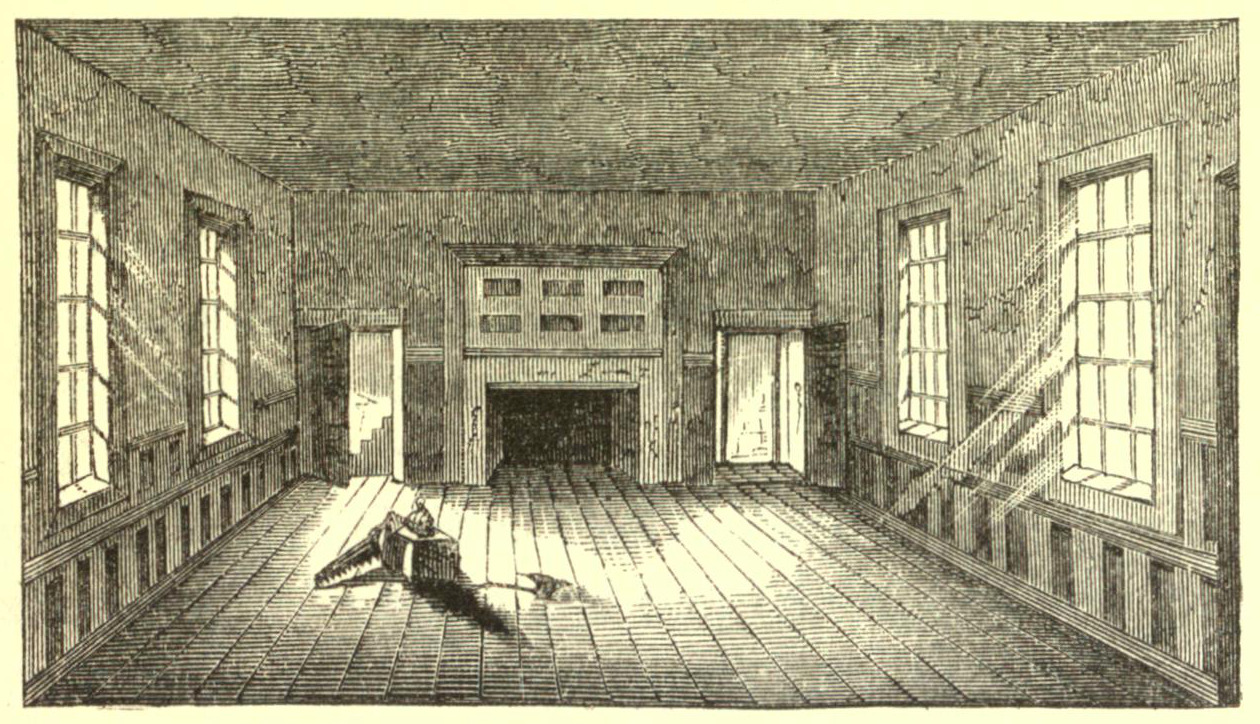
Engraving of the Apollo Room as it appeared in the 1850s during the visit by Benson Lossing

From 1699 to 1779, Williamsburg served as the capital of the colony of Virginia. As such, there were numerous taverns to host legislators and other visitors having business with the government while the House of Burgesses was in session.

The original tavern is believed to have been built some time before 1735. It changed ownership and keepers numerous times, continuing in use as a tavern, eventually being acquired by local cabinetmaker Anthony Hay (father of jurist George Hay) in 1767.

The tavern was an institution in Williamsburg; auctions as well as balls were held under the Raleigh's aegis. The tavern was the site of reception dinners held for at least two Royal Governors upon their arrival to Virginia: Robert Dinwiddie in November 1751, and Lord Botetourt in October 1768.

In May 1769, the Raleigh Tavern began its role as a center of sedition when Governor Botetourt dissolved the House of Burgesses, because of resolutions against the Townshend Acts. After its dissolution, the burgesses (Note: Signatories present included George Mason, George Washington, Thomas Jefferson, Peyton Randolph, Thomas Nelson, Jr., Richard Henry Lee, Richard Bland, Patrick Henry, and Carter Braxton) immediately convened in the Apollo Room as the 'late representatives of the people' and adopted the Non-Importation Agreement. The House of Burgesses was reconvened by the Governor in November that year.

This room was the frequent rendezvous of Thomas Jefferson, Patrick Henry, and other Revolutionary patriots. They met here in 1773 to develop intercolonial committees of correspondence. Dissolved by Governor Dunmore, the Burgesses met again in the Apollo Room in May 1774.

The Marquis de Lafayette was entertained at a banquet here in 1824, and the building remained in continual use as a tavern until it burned at the hands of an arsonist in 1859.

== Architecture ==
Based on period prints, the present reconstruction is an L-shaped white weatherboard building with 18 dormer windows.

The main room of the Raleigh Tavern was a banqueting hall known as the Apollo Room. Accounts note that the Latin motto Hilaritas sapientiae et bonae vitae proles ("Jollity is the offspring of wisdom and good living") was written over the mantel. Historian Lyon Gardiner Tyler wrote of the room that it "witnessed probably more scenes of brilliant festivity and political excitement than any other single apartment in North America".

== Reconstruction ==
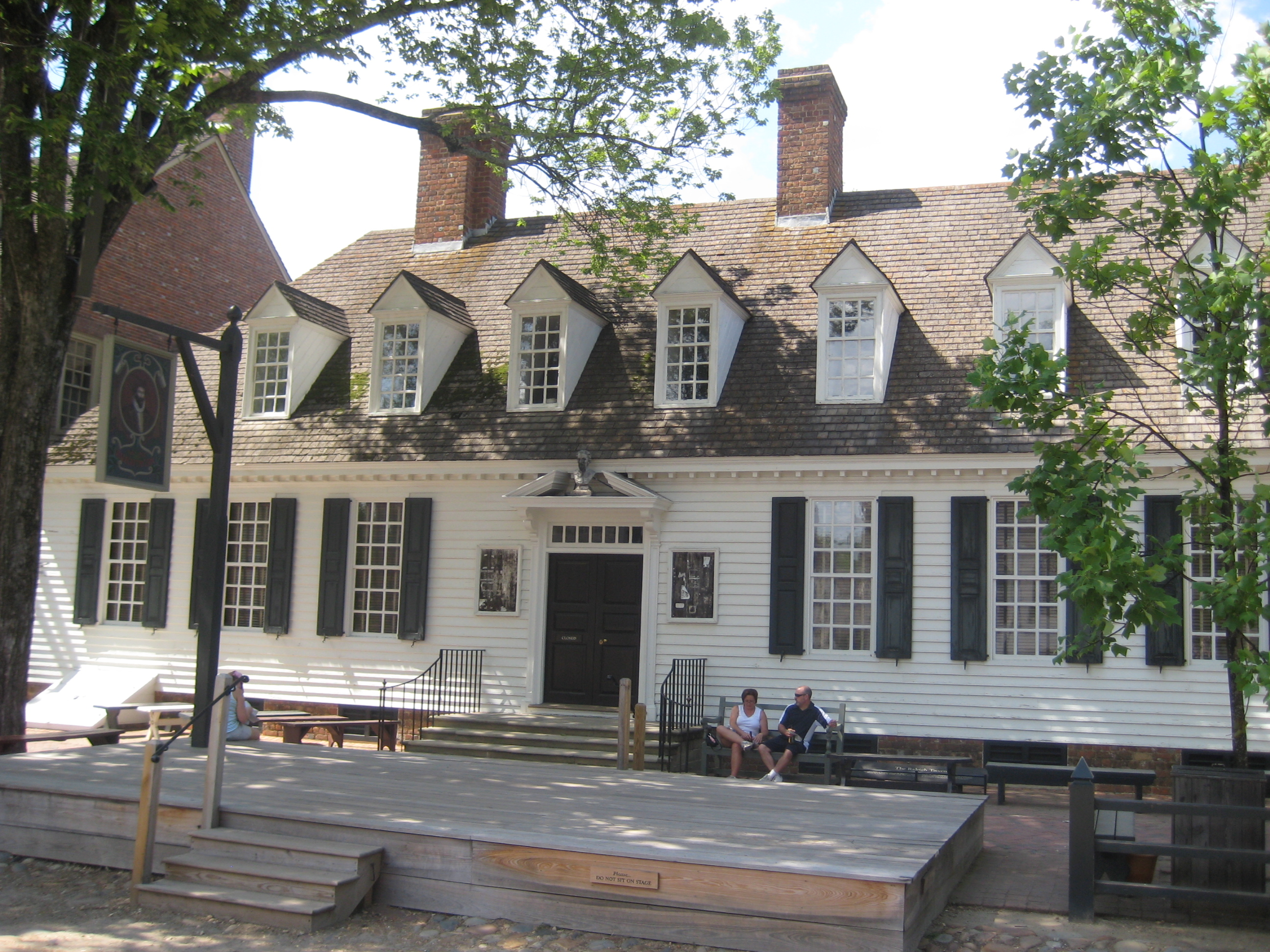
The reconstructed tavern

The tavern was reconstructed in 1930–31 on its original foundation. At a ceremony overseen by Virginia Gov. John Garland Pollard, the tavern opened to the public on September 16, 1932, thus marking the opening of Colonial Williamsburg.

The reconstructed Raleigh Tavern is one of the more modest but popular attractions of Colonial Williamsburg, a living history museum depicting life in Virginia's colonial capital city. It stands on Duke of Gloucester Street in contrast to the elaborate Capitol Building.
