= John Morton (American politician) =

American Founding Father and jurist (1725–1777)

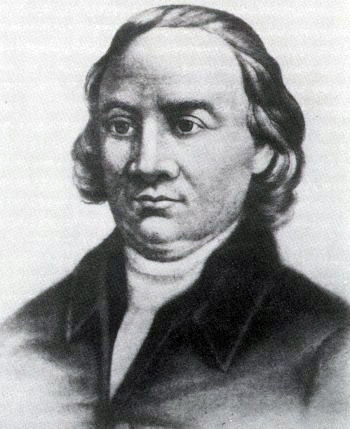
- 1750 portrait
- Born: 1725; Ridley, Pennsylvania, British America
- Died: 1 April 1777 (aged 51–52)
- Burial place: Chester, Pennsylvania, U.S.
- Children: 5 daughters and 3 sons

John Morton (1725 – April 1, 1777) was an American farmer, surveyor, and jurist from the Province of Pennsylvania and a Founding Father of the United States. As a delegate to the Continental Congress during the American Revolution, he was a signatory to the Continental Association and Declaration of Independence. Morton provided the swing vote that allowed Pennsylvania to vote in favor of the Declaration. Morton chaired the committee that wrote the Articles of Confederation, though he died before signing.

== Early life ==
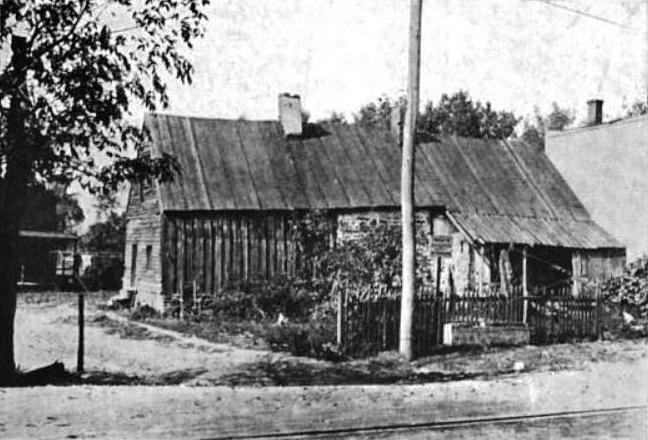
Morton's birthplace

Morton was born in Ridley, in Chester County, present-day Delaware County, Pennsylvania, in 1724 or 1725. His father, also named John Morton, died before his birth. His mother, Mary Archer, later married John Sketchley, a land surveyor of English ancestry. Sketchley raised and educated Morton, also training him in surveying.

Both of Morton's parents were of Finnish descent. His family background can be traced to the Forest Finns, settlers from eastern Finland who moved to central Sweden in the 16th and 17th centuries to practice slash-and-burn farming. Although his family roots have traditionally been traced to Rautalampi in northern Savo, DNA research suggests that they may have originally come from Kangasniemi parish in southern Savo. The long-standing story of the Rautalampi origin began when priest Salomon Ilmonen told about Morton's family roots without solid evidence. In 1654, Morton's great-grandfather Mårten Mårtensson emigrated with his family to the Swedish colony of New Sweden on the Delaware River. After New Sweden became English territory, his descendants anglicized their name to Morton.

Like his stepfather's father, Morton was a respected member of his community. He was an active member of the Anglican Church in Chester County, and served as a church elder.

== Political career ==
Morton was elected to the Pennsylvania Provincial Assembly in 1756. The following year he was also appointed justice of the peace, an office he held until 1764. He served as a delegate to the Stamp Act Congress in 1765. He resigned from the Assembly in 1766 to serve as sheriff of Chester County. He returned to the Assembly in 1769 and was elected speaker in 1775. Meanwhile, his judicial career reached its pinnacle with his appointment as an associate justice of the Supreme Court of Pennsylvania in 1774.

Morton was elected to the First Continental Congress in 1774 and the Second Continental Congress in 1775. He cautiously helped move Pennsylvania towards independence, though he opposed the radical Pennsylvania Constitution of 1776. When in June 1776 Congress began the debate on a resolution of independence, the Pennsylvania delegation was split, with Benjamin Franklin and James Wilson in favor of declaring independence, and John Dickinson, Robert Morris, Charles Humphreys and Thomas Willing opposed. Morton was uncommitted until July 1, when he sided with Franklin and Wilson. When the final vote was taken on July 2, Dickinson and Morris absented themselves, allowing the Pennsylvania delegation to support the resolution of independence. Morton signed the Declaration on August 2 with most of the other delegates.

Morton was chairman of the committee that wrote the Articles of Confederation, although he died, probably from tuberculosis, before the Articles were ratified. He was the first signer of the Declaration of Independence (and writer of the Articles of Confederation) to die, barely nine months after the Declaration's signing on July 4, 1776.

== Legacy ==
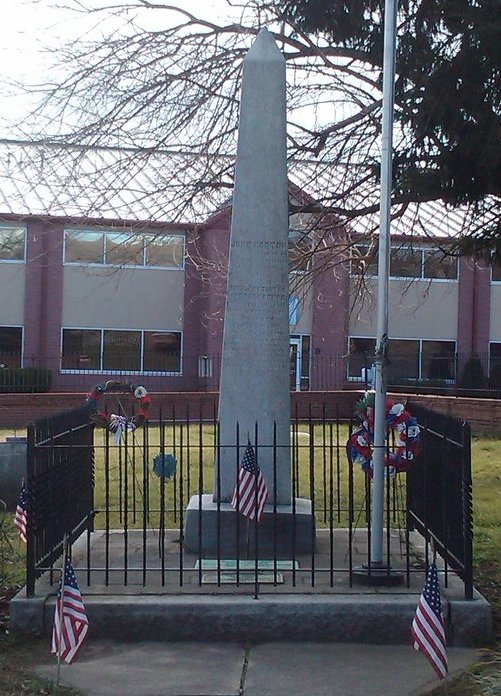
John Morton's grave in the Old St. Paul's Church Burial Ground, Chester, Pennsylvania.

Morton was the first signer of the Declaration of Independence to die and was buried in Old St. Paul's Church Burial Ground (also known as the Old Swedish Burial Ground) in Chester, Pennsylvania. Morton's grave remained unmarked until October 1845, when the present-day 11-foot marble obelisk was erected by his descendants.

The inscription on the west side of the memorial reads:

Dedicated to the memory of John Morton, A member of the First American Congress from the State of Pennsylvania, Assembled in New York in 1765, and of the next Congress, assembled in Philadelphia in 1774. Born A.D., 1724 - Died April 1777.

The inscription of the east side of the memorial reads:

In voting by States upon the question of the Independence of the American Colonies, there was a tie until the vote of Pennsylvania was given, two members of which voted in the affirmative, and two in the negative. The tie continued until the vote of the last member, John Morton, decided the promulgation of the Glorious Diploma of American Freedom.

The inscription on the south side of the memorial reads:

In 1775, while speaker of the Assembly of Pennsylvania, John Morton was elected a Member of Congress, and in the ever memorable session of 1776, he attended that august body for the last time, establishing his name in the grateful remembrance of the American People by signing the Declaration of Independence.

The inscription on the north side of the memorial reads:

John Morton being censured by his friends for his boldness in giving his casting vote for the Declaration of Independence, his prophetic spirit dictated from his death bed the following message to them: 'Tell them they shall live to see the hour when they shall acknowledge it to have been the most glorious service I ever rendered to my country.

John Morton's role in signing the Declaration of Independence has been important for the identity of Finnish Americans. In the early 20th century, Finnish immigrants asserted their place among the "founding nationalities" of the United States through Morton and the Delaware colony. Amateur historian Reverend Salomon Ilmonen helped promote this connection during Delaware's 300th anniversary. Celebrations of the New Sweden colony and Morton's legacy in 1938 and in 1988 boosted Finnish Americans' pride in their heritage.

In 2013 University of Turku established the John Morton Center for North American Studies, after it was concluded that the field of studies regarding North America was fragmented and a national institute was needed.

== Personal life ==
In 1754, Morton married Ann Justis of Chester County, and together they had three sons and five daughters; Aaron, Sketchley, John, Mary, Sarah, Lydia, Ann and Elizabeth. Like Morton, Ann Justis was of Finnish or Swedish descent. Their second son, Sketchley, later served as a major in the Pennsylvania Militia of the Continental Army during the American Revolutionary War.

== See also ==
- Memorial to the 56 Signers of the Declaration of Independence
