= Simon Boerum =

American politician

Coordinates: 40°39′8″N 73°59′23″W

- Born: 29 February 1724; Brooklyn, New York, British Empire
- Died: 11 July 1775 (aged 51); Brooklyn, New York, British Empire
- Burial place: New York City, New York, United States

Simon Boerum (February 29, 1724 – July 11, 1775) was a farmer, miller, and political leader from Brooklyn, New York. He represented New York in the Continental Congress in 1774 and 1775. He signed the Continental Association.

Boerum's family settled on Long Island when it was a part of the Dutch colony of New Netherland. His parents were William Jacob Boerum (1687–1766) and Rachel (Bloom) Boerum (1690–1738), who farmed in the town of New Lots, in Kings County, New York, which is now part of Brooklyn. Simon was born there on February 29, 1724, and was baptized in the Dutch Reformed Church on March 8. He attended and graduated from the Dutch school in Flatbush. Boerum farmed and operated a mill in Flatbush. In 1748, he bought a home and garden at what is today the southwest corner of Fulton and Hoyt streets in downtown Brooklyn. On April 30, 1748, he married Maria Schenck (1726–1771), and the house became their home for the rest of their lives.

In 1750, Governor George Clinton appointed Boerum as county clerk for Kings County. He would hold that office for the rest of his life, as well as a seat in the Province of New York Assembly after 1761. In 1774, the Assembly could not reach agreement about the Continental Congress. Kings County selected him to represent them, and on October 1, 1774, the Congress added him to the New York delegation. In the Congress, he supported the non-importation agreement and the more radical members in general. He helped to defeat the Galloway Plan for union and reconciliation with England.

Early in 1775, the Colony's Assembly rejected the work of the first Congress and was hurriedly adjourned to prevent further measures from consideration. In April, Boerum was elected to the revolutionary New York Provincial Congress. That body in turn named him once again to the Continental Congress, but illness soon forced his return from Philadelphia. Simon died at home on July 11, 1775, and was originally buried in the Dutch Burying Ground in New Lots. In 1848, he and his wife, Maria, were re-interred in the Green-Wood Cemetery in Brooklyn.
