= Nathaniel Folsom =

American politician

Nathaniel Folsom (September 28, 1726 – May 26, 1790) was an American merchant and statesman. He was a delegate for New Hampshire in the Continental Congress in 1774 and 1777 to 1780, signing the Continental Association. He served as major general of the New Hampshire Militia during the American Revolutionary War.

== Private life ==
Folsom was born into a large family in Exeter, New Hampshire. His ancestors were among Exeter's earliest settlers, having arrived with the Gilman family, to whom they were related, from Hingham, Massachusetts, where both families settled for a time before moving on to New Hampshire. The original spelling of the family name was Foulsham. The Folsoms continued to hold land outside Hingham, Norfolk, England, many years after leaving for the Massachusetts Bay Colony. In 1673, John Folsom of Exeter gave his son Peter 50 acres (200,000 m^{2}) of land in Norfolk County, England, which he had inherited from his family.

Nathaniel Folsom's father Jonathan (c. 1685–1740) married Ann Ladd (1691–1742), and she gave birth to Anna, Sarah, Lydia, Elizabeth, Abigail, John, Mary, Nathaniel, Jonathan, Samuel, Josiah and Trueworthy (named for Folsom's Treworgy ancestors). When Folsom's father died in January 1740, the thirteen-year-old Nathaniel went to work for a merchant. He invested in timber and opened a sawmill. Then in 1761, he went into business with some distant cousins, Joseph and Josiah Gilman. They became Folsom, Gilman & Gilman and opened a general store, built ships, and carried on an import/export business. The firm operated in Exeter and Portsmouth. Though the partners separated in 1768, Folsom continued in foreign commerce, timber, and lumber operations for the rest of his life.

Folsom married twice, first to Dorothy Smith (1726–1776). Their children included: Nathaniel, Dorothy, Jonathan, Anna, Arthur, Mary, and Deborah. Deborah was New Hampshire Governor John Taylor Gilman's first wife, and Mary was his second). Folsom married again to Mary Fisher, and they had one daughter, Ruth Weare.

== Military career ==
Folsom joined the militia as did most young men. During the French and Indian War he was captain of a company in the New Hampshire Provincial Regiment during the Crown Point expedition led by Sir William Johnson in 1755. At the Battle of Lake George, his company, supported by artillery from Massachusetts, surprised and captured Baron Dieskau, the French commander-in-chief. Besides capturing the Baron, they dispersed the French troops, took the French baggage train and seized a critical mass of supplies, with the loss of only six men.

Folsom went on to become a colonel of the Fourth Regiment of New Hampshire Militia. His formal commission was revoked by Governor John Wentworth after the raid on Fort William and Mary in December 1774. Disregarding this, Colonel Folsom marched his regiment to Portsmouth and escorted the captured cannons safely back to Durham.

Near the beginning of the Revolutionary War, the Provincial Congress named him brigadier general in command of New Hampshire's forces. This created some confusion, as the Massachusetts provisional government had named John Stark to the same position. At the time, Colonel Stark was the senior commander of the New Hampshire men who had marched to the Siege of Boston. The confusion was resolved in June 1775, when the Continental Congress named John Sullivan general of those New Hampshire forces in service with the Continental Army. Folsom was the senior officer for militia forces within the state. He was later named a major general, and continued recruiting, training, and supply efforts throughout the war.

== Political career ==
Folsom had served several years as moderator of the town meetings at Exeter. When the revolutionary Provincial Congress first met on July 21, 1774, he was a delegate. The Provincial Congress named him their delegate to the First Continental Congress that met in Philadelphia, during which he was a signatory to the Continental Association.

Folsom was a member when everything relating to the success of the Revolution wore a dubious aspect. At this period too, when there were so many scattered and dispersed throughout the country who sympathized with the mother country and who were denominated Tories, it became necessary to adopt some method, or to institute some measure, by which it could be known who were friends and who were enemies of the cause of Independence. Accordingly, the Continental Congress made a provision whereby all persons friendly to the cause of liberty and independence were required to associate and sign an obligation to oppose, by arms and money, the hostilities of the British. This obligation was denominated the Association Test. All who refused to sign it were disarmed and watched with jealous care, and every hostile demonstration noted and reported to the Committee of Safety, which was composed of a body of men appointed by the General Assembly. Their order and recommendations had all the force and effect and was considered equally binding as the acts and resolves of the General Assembly.

In 1775, Folsom continued his service in the provincial congress, as he would do until 1783. He became a close political ally of Meshech Weare and Josiah Bartlett, as he was named to the New Hampshire Committee of Safety. In January 1776, he also became a justice in the Rockingham County court of common pleas. In 1777 and 1779 he was returned as a delegate to the Second Continental Congress.

In 1783, he became the chief judge in the common pleas court. That same year he went to, and presided over, the state's constitutional convention. When a constitution was adopted, as president of the convention, he wrote a cover letter, then forwarded it to the towns for ratification. Ironically, one problem addressed by the constitution was to limit the number of offices held by one man. Folsom thus resigned from the Assembly, as head of the militia, and from the Governor's Council. He held the position of chief judge in Rockingham County until his death in Exeter on May 26, 1790. He is buried in Exeter's Winter Street Cemetery.
