= Richard Smith (Continental Congress) =

American lawyer and politician (1735-1803)

Richard Smith (March 22, 1735 – September 17, 1803) was a lawyer and politician who served in the Continental Congress and signed the Continental Association.

== Personal life and education ==
Richard Smith was born in Burlington, Province of New Jersey, to Richard Smith, a member of the West Jersey Assembly, and Abigail Raper Smith. Smith was educated under private teachers and in Quaker schools and studied law.

Smith moved to Laurens, New York, in 1790, and then to Philadelphia in 1799. He died September 17, 1803, near Natchez, Mississippi, and was interred in Natchez Cemetery.

== Career ==
Smith was admitted to the bar in 1762 and practiced in Philadelphia, Pennsylvania, and later in Burlington. He was commissioned county clerk of Burlington on December 7, 1762.

Smith was chosen as a New Jersey delegate to the Continental Congress from July 23, 1774, to June 12, 1776, when he resigned. He was a member of the New Jersey Legislative Council (now the New Jersey Senate) in 1776 and was elected treasurer of New Jersey, serving 1776 until he resigned on February 15, 1777.
