= Eliphalet Dyer =

American judge

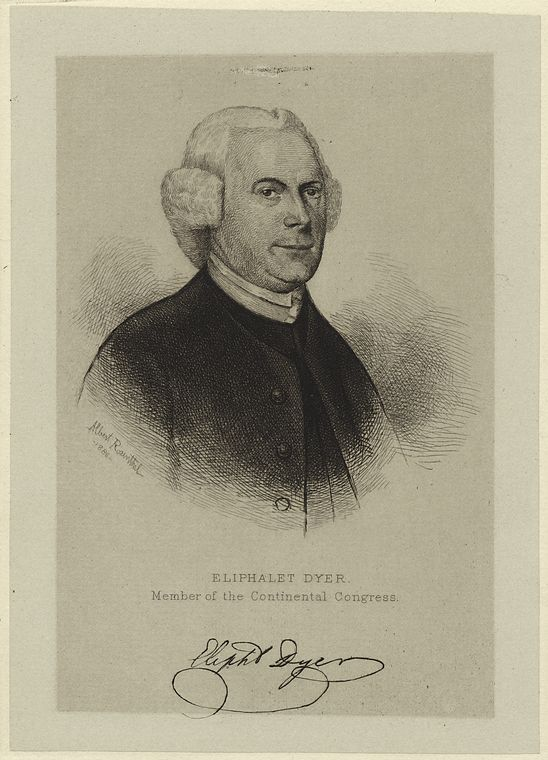

Chief Justice of the Connecticut Supreme Court
- In office 1789–1793

Delegate to the Continental Congress
- In office 1774–1779
- In office 1782–1783

Member of the Connecticut House of Representatives
- In office 1756–1784

Personal details
- Born: September 14, 1721 Windham, Connecticut, U.S.
- Died: May 13, 1807 (aged 85) Windham, Connecticut, U.S.
- Resting place: Windham Cemetery
- Spouse: Huldah
- Children: 6
- Education: Yale College (1740)

Military service
- Rank: Colonel
- Battles/wars: French and Indian War

Eliphalet Dyer (September 14, 1721 – May 13, 1807) was an American lawyer, jurist, and statesman from Windham, Connecticut. He was a delegate for Connecticut to many sessions of the Continental Congress, where he signed the 1774 Continental Association.

== Early life and education ==
Dyer was born in Windham and attended Yale, where he graduated in 1740. He read law and was admitted to the bar in 1746.

== Career ==
After completing his legal education, Dyer became a member of the militia. In 1747, he was elected justice of the peace and a member of the colonial assembly. He was also involved in several of the land development schemes for the Susquehanna and Wyoming Valley areas.

During the French and Indian War, Dyer served as a lieutenant colonel in the militia. He participated in the expedition that captured Crown Point from the French, as a Colonel of the Third Connecticut Provincial Regiment in 1755. In 1758, he was commissioned again by the Connecticut legislature as colonel of a new iteration of the Third Connecticut Provincial Regiment, but he declined the appointment and Colonel Eleazer Fitch was appointed in his place.

In 1763, he visited London as an agent for the Susquehanna Land Company in a failed attempt to gain a title for a colonial venture to the Wyoming region. Connecticut sent Dyer to New York City for the Stamp Act Congress. This Congress of protest was an important precursor to the American Revolution. In 1766, he was elected a justice of Connecticut’s superior court. He held that post until 1793, serving as chief justice after 1789.

As the Revolution began, Dyer was named to the state’s Committee of Safety and named a delegate to the Continental Congress in 1774. He served in the Congress during 1774–1775, 1777–1779, and 1782–1783. John Adams, in his diary, characterized Dyer as "...longwinded and roundabout, obscure and cloudy, very talkative and very tedious, yet an honest, worthy man; means and judges well."

== Personal life ==
Dyer retired from public life in 1793. He died at home in Windham on May 13, 1807, and is buried in the Windham Cemetery. His daughter Amelia was married to Joseph Trumbull, who officially served with Dyer in the Continental Congress but did not attend any sessions.
