= George Ross (American politician) =

American Founding Father and politician

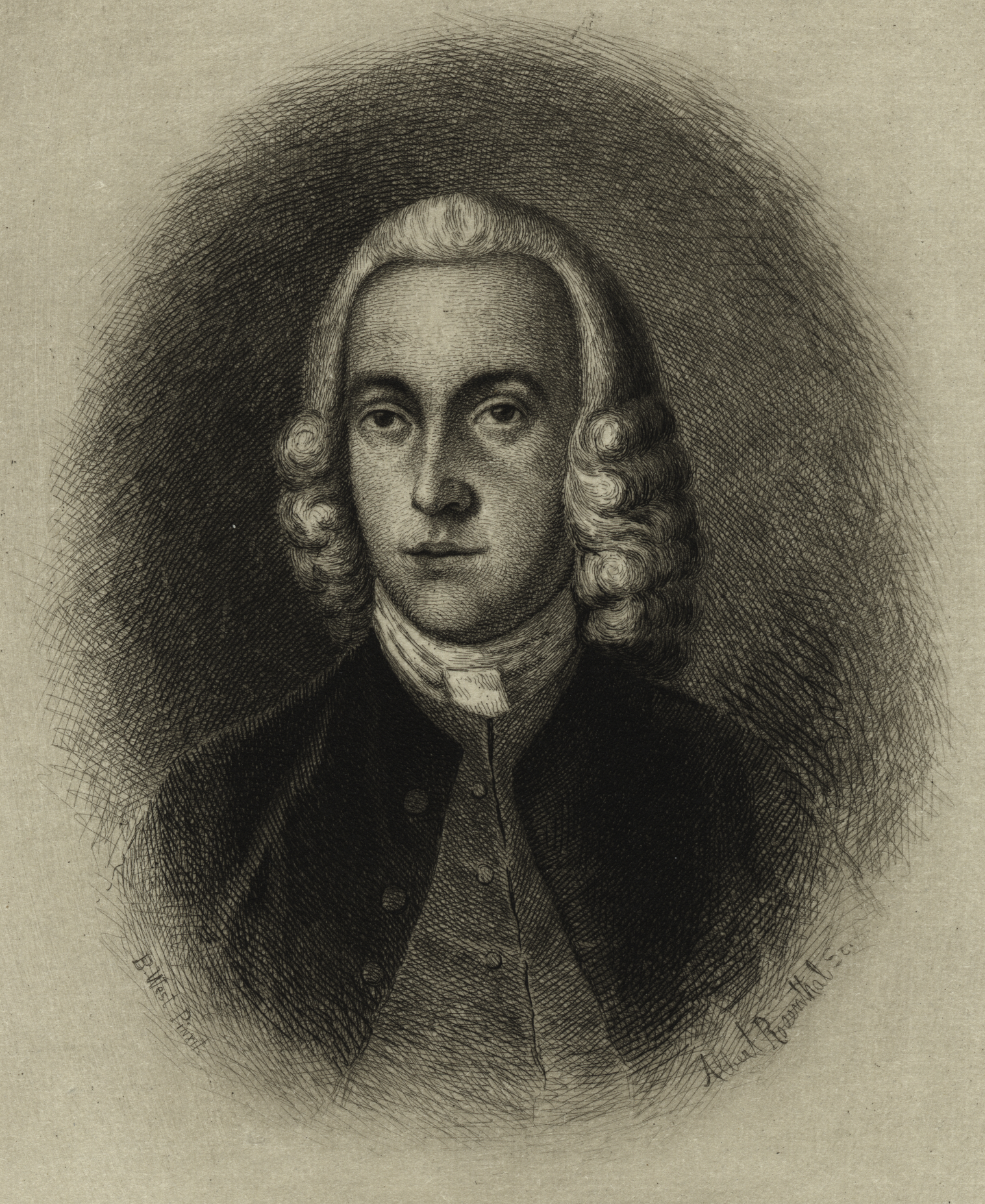
- Born: May 10, 1730; New Castle, Delaware Colony, British America
- Died: July 14, 1779 (aged 49); Philadelphia, Pennsylvania, U.S.
- Resting place: Christ Church Burial Ground, Philadelphia
- Known for: signer of the United States Declaration of Independence

Signature
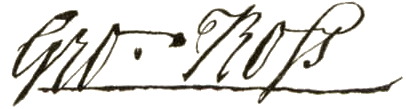

George Ross Jr (May 10, 1730 – July 14, 1779) was a Founding Father of the United States who signed the Continental Association and the United States Declaration of Independence as a representative of Pennsylvania. He was also the uncle of the man who married Betsy Griscom in 1773, more famous under her married name, Betsy Ross. In 1952, Ross, George Washington, and Robert Morris appeared on a three-cent stamp commemorating Betsy Ross.

== Early life and family ==
Coat of Arms of George Ross

Ross was born on May 10, 1730, in New Castle, Delaware. He was educated at home and later studied law with his brother, before being admitted to the bar in Philadelphia.

His father was Rev. George Ross (1679–1754), who had 2 wives and 16 children, and was an Anglican clergyman who had emigrated from Scotland. Their paternal line goes back to Farquhar Ó Beólláin (1173–1251) whom King Alexander II of Scotland named 1st Earl of Ross in 1226 after great victories in battle.

George's sister Gertrude married Thomas Till, the son of William Till, a prominent Sussex County judge and politician; after his death, she married George Read, another signer of the Declaration of Independence.

== Career ==
Ross was a member of the committee of safety and was elected to the Continental Congress. He was a colonel in the Pennsylvania militia (1775–1776) and vice-president of the first constitutional convention for Pennsylvania. Ross was the last of the Pennsylvania delegation to affix his signature to the Declaration of Independence. He had been loyal to the king, but he became disgusted with Tory politics and began to support the cause of the Patriots.

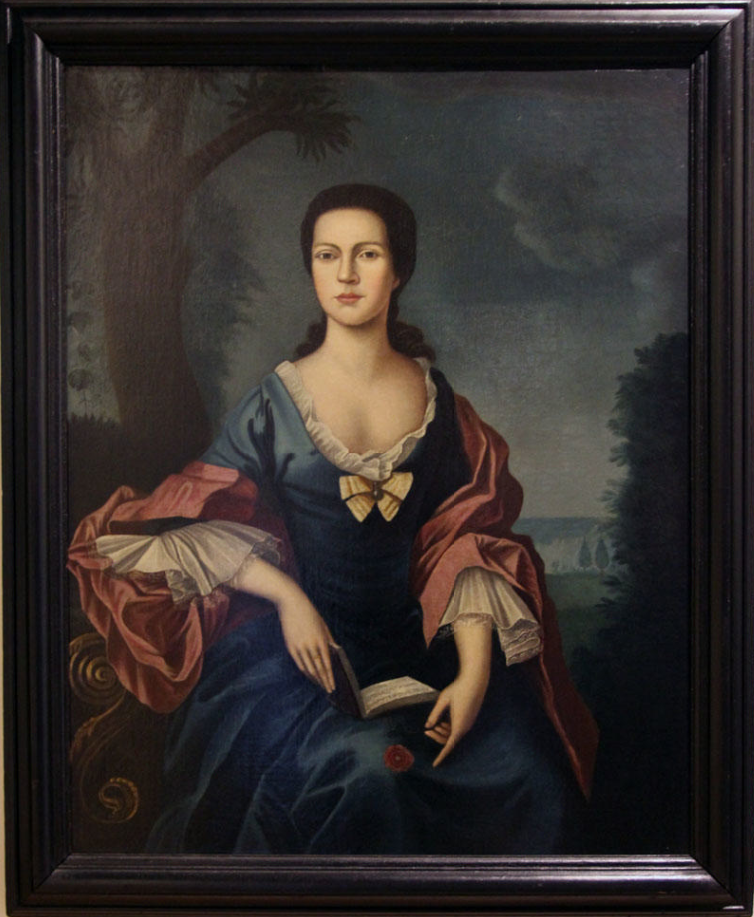
Ann Lawler, c. 1755 portrait by Benjamin West

In 1750, he was admitted to the Pennsylvania Bar (member of Pennsylvania) when he was 20 years old, and he established his own practice in Lancaster, where he married Ann Lawler in 1751. Together they had two sons and a daughter.

Initially a Tory, he served as Crown prosecutor for 12 years from 1768 to 1776. His sympathies began to change, and he became a strong supporter of the colonial assemblies in their disputes with Parliament. In 1768 he was elected to the provincial legislature of Pennsylvania. He was elected to Continental Congress in 1774, 1776, and 1777. He was a colonel in the Continental Army in 1776. In 1776, he undertook negotiations with the northwestern Indians on behalf of his colony, and that year he acted as vice president of the state constitutional convention, so then that led to helping draft a declaration of rights. He was re-elected to the Continental Congress in January 1777 but resigned that same year because of poor health. He was vice president of the Pennsylvania constitutional convention and was the Judge of the Admiralty Court of Pennsylvania in 1779. In 1778, while he was acting as admiralty judge, a congressional court of appeals overruled his decision in a case involving a dispute between a citizen of Connecticut and the state of Pennsylvania. He refused to acknowledge the authority of the higher court to counter state decisions, which initiated a dispute between manifestation of the states' rights controversy and did not subside until 1809.

He resigned from the Continental Congress in 1777 because of poor health and was appointed to the Pennsylvania Court of Admiralty where he died in 1779 at age 49. He was buried at Christ Church Burial Ground in Philadelphia.

== See also ==
- Memorial to the 56 Signers of the Declaration of Independence
