= Journals of the Continental Congress =

Official records of the first national legislative body of the US

The Journals of the Continental Congress are official records from the first three representative bodies of the original United Colonies and ultimately the United States of America.

The First Continental Congress was formed and met from September 5 to October 26, 1774, at Carpenters' Hall in Philadelphia, at the beginning of the American Revolution. Its purpose was to address "intolerable acts" and other infringements imposed on the colonies by the British Parliament. On October 20, 1774, the First Continental Congress passed the Continental Association, and it ultimately formed the Second Continental Congress in May 1775 which, through 1781, was responsible for authoring and considering issuance of the Declaration of Independence and other critical articles, which are considered founding documents of the nation.

The Congress of the Confederation, which also convened in Philadelphia and existed from 1781 to until the establishment of American independence in 1789, succeeded the Second Continental Congress.

These are the important papers, letters, treaties, reports, and assorted records, some of which are iconic and famed and others of which remain obscure, that contributed to the revolutionary establishment of American independence and subsequent establishment of the United States government.

Between 1904 and 1937, the Library of Congress in Washington, D.C. published a complete edition of these papers titled Journals of the Continental Congress, a 34-volume edition edited by Worthington C. Ford.

== See also ==
- Bibliography of the American Revolutionary War
- Founding Fathers of the United States
- List of delegates to the Continental and Confederation congresses
- Syng inkstand
- Charles Thomson, secretary of the three Congresses
