= Charles Humphreys =

American politician

Charles Humphreys (September 19, 1714 – March 11, 1786) was a signatory to the Continental Association while representing the Province of Pennsylvania in the First Continental Congress. A miller and fuller, he benefitted from the system of chattel slavery that existed in the province during that time by using enslaved laborers to operate his businesses.

== Biography ==
Humphreys was born in Haverford, Pennsylvania. The son of Daniel and Hannah (née Wynne; daughter of Dr. Thomas Wynne) Humphreys, he and his two sisters, Elizabeth and Rebecca, became the enslavers during their adult years of multiple Black men, women and children, including: Thomas Craill, Caesar Waters, Judy Miller, Nany, Nancy, Dolly, Alice, Fanny, and Tommey in 1780. Tom and Caesar were adult men. Judy, Nany, Nancy, and Dolly were adult women; and Alice, Fanny, and Tommey were children.

Charles Humphreys served as a delegate for Pennsylvania to the Continental Congress from 1774 to 1776. He was a signatory to the Continental Association; however, he voted against the Declaration of Independence because he felt the action would place him into conflict with his Quaker beliefs because he believed the Declaration's passage could escalate into war. He withdrew from the Congress soon afterwards. Despite not taking part in the Revolutionary War, he sympathized with the Patriot cause and was critical of incidents of oppression by the British government and its representatives.

Humphreys became the owner of a grist and fulling mill in 1782.

== Death ==
Humphreys died in Haverford in 1786.
