= Pennsylvania Provincial Conference =

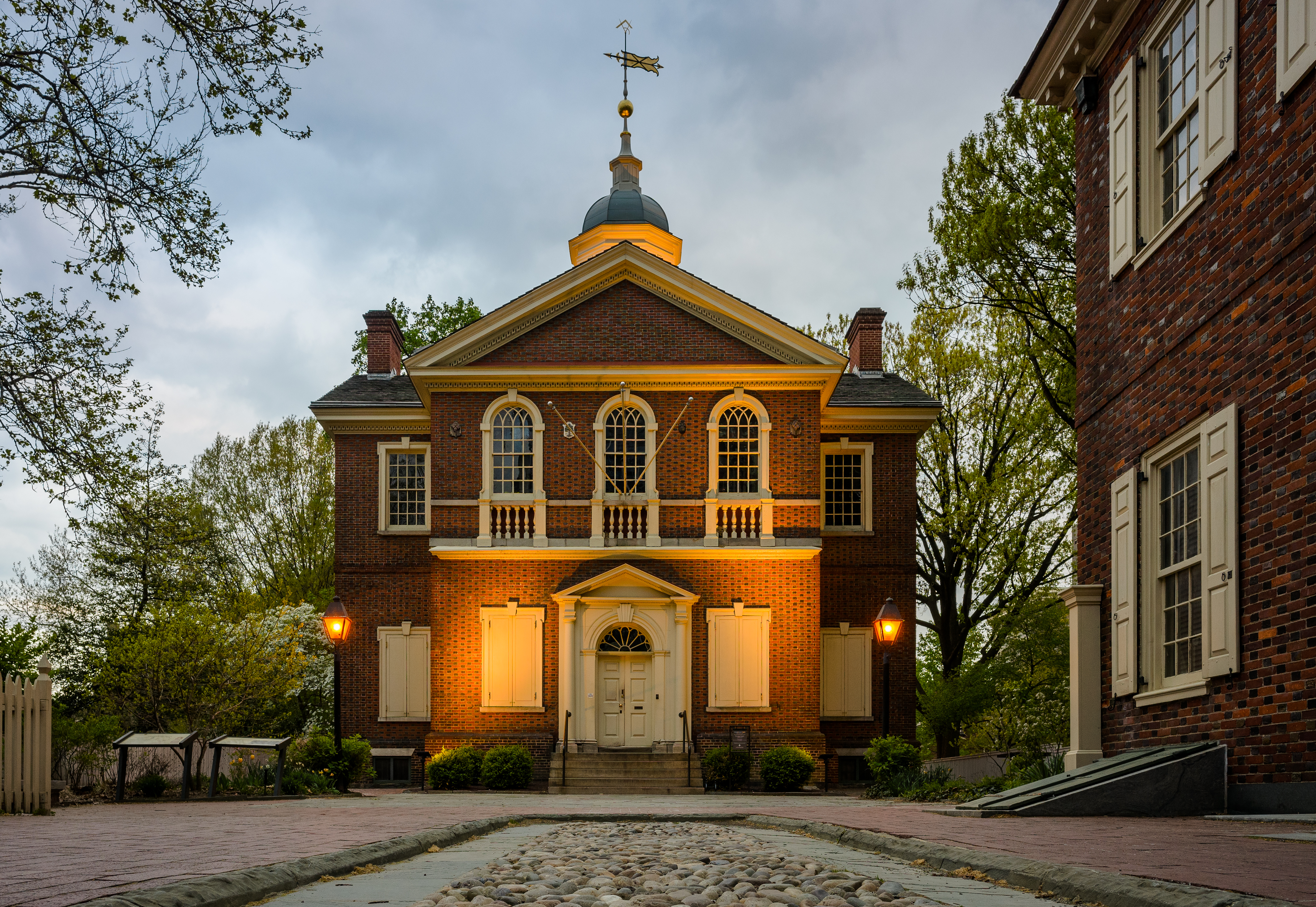
- Date: June 18–25, 1776
- Venue: Carpenters' Hall
- Location: Philadelphia, Pennsylvania; 39.94814°N 75.14722°W
- Type: Provincial Congress
- Cause: Outbreak of the American Revolutionary War
- Outcome: Pennsylvania declared its independence from Great Britain; Procedure set for electing delegates to state constitutional convention

The Pennsylvania Provincial Conference, officially the Provincial Conference of Committees of the Province of Pennsylvania, was a Provincial Congress, which met in Carpenters' Hall in Philadelphia between June 18 and June 25, 1776. The 97 delegates in attendance (out of 103 appointed) involved themselves in issues relating to declaring Pennsylvania's support for independence and to planning for a subsequent gathering that would develop Pennsylvania's new Frame of Government. They achieved these objectives by formally:

- Declaring Pennsylvania's independence from the British Empire, thus birthing the Commonwealth of Pennsylvania,
- Mobilizing the Pennsylvania militia for the American Revolutionary War,
- Organizing elections to select delegates to a constitutional convention – which framed the Pennsylvania Constitution of 1776.

As the last holdout among the Thirteen Colonies to declare independence, the conference's actions had a profound impact on American public opinion and facilitated the issuing of the Declaration of Independence shortly afterward by the Continental Congress.

== Delegates ==
Following is a list of those who attended the Pennsylvania Provincial Conference.

From Bedford County:

- David Davidson
- David Espy
- John Piper

From Berks County:

- Mark Bird
- Valentine Eckerd
- Henry Haller
- Joseph Hiester
- David Hunter
- Nicholas Lutz
- Jacob Morgan
- Bodo Otto
- Charles Shoemaker
- Benjamin Spiker

From Bucks County:

- Joseph Hart
- John Kidd
- Benjamin Single
- John Wallace
- Henry Wynkoop

From Chester County:

- Caleb Davis
- Evan Evans
- William Evans
- Samuel Fairlamb
- Lewis Grono
- Thomas Horkley
- Thomas Levis
- Colonel Hugh Lloyd
- William Montgomery
- John Morton
- Elisha Price
- Richard Reiley
- Richard Thomas

From Cumberland County:

- Hugh Alexander
- William Clark
- John Maclay
- John Colhoon
- John Creigh
- William Elliot
- John Harris
- James M. Lane
- Hugh McCormick

From Lancaster County:

- William Augustus Atlee
- William Brown
- James Cunningham
- Bartram Galbraith
- Andrew Graaf
- David Jenkins
- Lodowick Lowman
- Alexander Lowrey
- John Smiley

From Northampton County:

- David Deshler
- Benjamin Dupue
- Nicholas Depue
- Neigal Gray
- Robert Levers
- John Wetzel

From Philadelphia:

- Jacob Barge
- John Bayard
- Joseph Brusstar
- Samuel Brusstar, Sr.
- William Coates
- John Cox
- Joseph Dean
- Sharp Delany
- George Goodwin
- Francis Gurney
- William Lowman
- Christoper Ludwig
- Benjamin Loxley
- Christopher Marshall
- Timothy Matlack
- Thomas McKean
- Samuel Morris
- James Moulden
- James Mulligan
- Benjamin Rush
- George Schlosser
- Jacob Schriner
- Jonathan Bayard Smith

From Philadelphia County:

- Frederick Antes
- Mathew Brook
- John Bull
- Enoch Edwards
- Henry Hill
- Robert Lewis
- Robert Loller
- Joseph Mather

From Westmoreland County:

- Edward Cook
- James Perry

From York County:

- Richard M. Chester
- James Egar
- David Kennedy
- Robert McPherson
- William Rankin
- James Read
- Henry Slagle
- James Smith

== See also ==
- Pennsylvania in the American Revolution
- 111th Infantry Regiment, a U.S. National Guard unit, formerly Pennsylvania's Revolutionary War era militia
- Sweet Land of Liberty: The Ordeal of the American Revolution in Northampton County, Pennsylvania. By Francis S. Fox
