= Davis-Lenox House =

Row house in Philadelphia, Pennsylvania, U.S.

Coordinates: 39°56′41″N 75°08′44″W

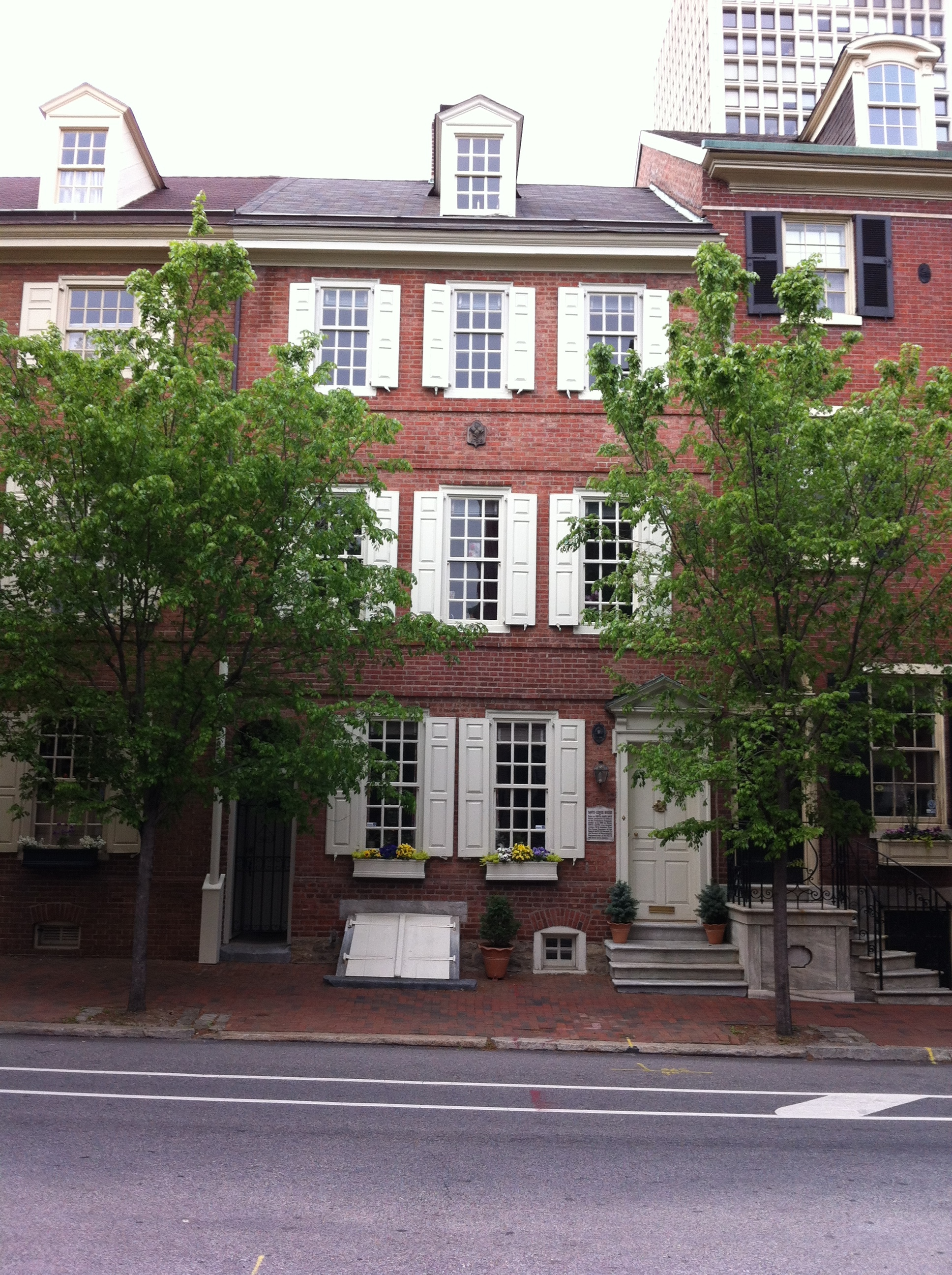
Historic Davis-Lenox House in Philadelphia, Pennsylvania USA

The Davis-Lenox House is an historically significant 18th-century row house in the colonial style located at 217 Spruce Street in the Society Hill neighborhood of Philadelphia, Pennsylvania, United States.

== Construction ==
The house was first built by James Davis, Jr., a Master Builder and an early member of the Carpenters' Company of the City and County of Philadelphia, America's first builders’ guild. Davis served as Assistant Warden of the organization from 1767 to 1770 and was a major contributor towards the construction of Carpenters' Hall in Philadelphia. Davis had acquired the lot on which the Davis-Lenox house stands in 1758 for 5 pounds yearly ground rent and completed construction of a two-story brick house and kitchen in 1759.

== Early history ==
Following Davis' death, his heirs sold the house in 1779 to Revolutionary War hero and prominent Philadelphian David Lenox. Lenox and his wife, Tacy (née Lukens), added a third floor bedroom and sitting room, garret, and new kitchen in 1784.

Lenox was born in Kirkcudbright, Scotland and emigrated to Philadelphia sometime before the outbreak of the Revolutionary War. When war broke out, he joined the Continental Army and was commissioned captain of the 3rd Battalion of the Pennsylvania Militia. While fighting the Hessians at Fort Washington in 1776, he was wounded, taken prisoner, and held by the British for eighteen months. Following his release, he served as aide-de-camp with the rank of Major to Major General Anthony Wayne. Lenox also joined Philadelphia's First City Troop. While a member, he led a successful rescue of James Wilson, one of the "founding fathers" of the United States and a signatory of the Declaration of Independence, when Wilson and others barricaded themselves in Wilson's home ("Fort Wilson") during a riot in response to Wilson's successful defense of 23 people from property seizure and exile by the state government.

== After the Revolutionary War ==
Following the Revolutionary War, Lenox became a successful merchant, government official, diplomat, and banker. In 1793 President George Washington appointed Lenox to be the second U.S. Marshal for the District of Pennsylvania where he was instrumental in suppressing the Whiskey Rebellion. After Lenox left his position as Marshal, he served as Agent for the United States to the Court of St. James's, during which he worked to exchange American sailors who were captured by the British and French. Later, he distinguished himself in commerce, banking and finance, including as Trustee of the Girard Bank and as President of the Philadelphia Bank. Lenox died in 1828 and is buried near the house in Old Pine Street Church Cemetery.

== Various owners and occupants ==
The Davis-Lenox House has had many owners and occupants since Lenox sold it in 1810, and the steady flow of immigrants through Philadelphia's port nearby is reflected in the nationalities of those who have lived there since then. Regrettably, its condition deteriorated in the late 19th and early 20th centuries, but in 1960 it was carefully restored to its original 18th-century condition by Mr. and Mrs. C. Jared Ingersoll, descendants of a signer of the Declaration of Independence. It was one of the first and most successful examples of Philadelphia's urban renewal endeavor to restore Society Hill to its former colonial era glory. A second third floor bedroom and two bathrooms were added to the house in 1990.

== Architectural integrity ==
Today, the house still conforms closely to the period of Lenox's ownership of the house, and the fundamental architectural integrity of the building remains largely intact. It has been said that the Davis-Lenox House “is one of the finest examples of colonial city houses in Philadelphia in the late 18th century.” Built of old brick, the house is three and a half stories high, with brick belt courses between the floors. The front door is eight paneled, with a pediment above. A brick water table is positioned between the first floor windows and the foundation. The half story contains a dormer window. The interior room layout is essentially the same as it was in the early 19th century.

Of the seven fireplaces in the house, six have the original paneling, mantles, firebacks, marble facings, and hearths. The facings of three fireplaces are King of Prussia blue marble. Most of the other woodwork and floors are original as is the exterior brick and the frontispiece over the front door. Three fire insurance marks appear on the second floor facade, representing the Philadelphia Contributorship, the Insurance Company of North America, and the Mutual Assurance Company.

The house is registered with the Philadelphia Register of Historic Places and is included in the Historic American Buildings Survey.

The house is privately owned.
