= St. Peter's Episcopal Church (Philadelphia) =

Historic church in Pennsylvania, United States

- St. Peter's Church
- U.S. National Register of Historic Places
- U.S. National Historic Landmark
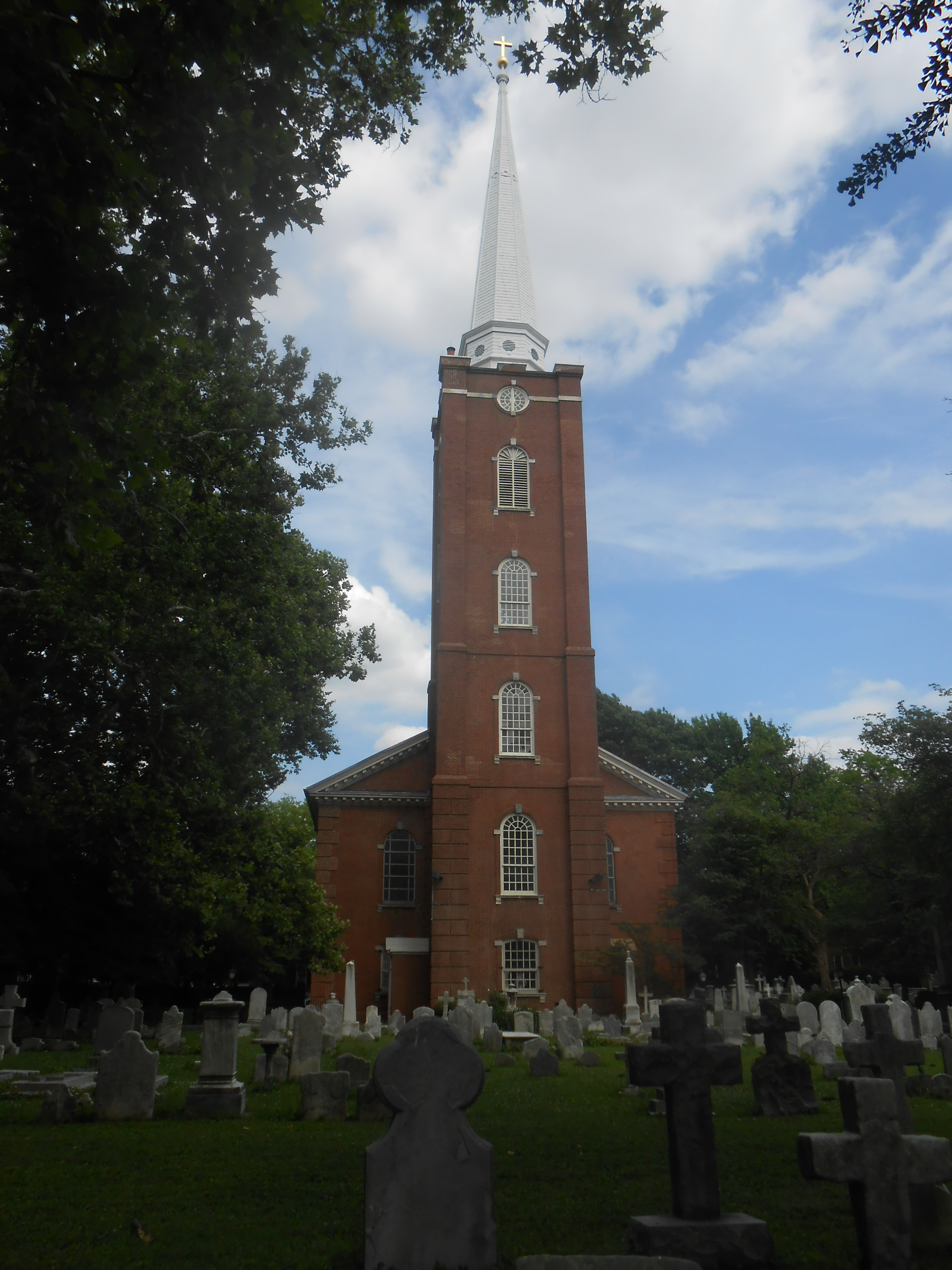
- St. Peter's Episcopal Church in Philadelphia, 2014

- Location within Philadelphia Location within Pennsylvania Location within the United States
- Location: 3rd and Pine Streets, Philadelphia, Pennsylvania, U.S.
- Coordinates: 39°56′35.3″N 75°8′51.7″W
- Built: 1758
- Architect: Robert Smith; William Strickland
- Architectural style: Georgian
- NRHP reference No.: 96000969

Significant dates
- Added to NRHP: June 18, 1996
- Designated NHL: June 18, 1996

St. Peter's Church is a historic Episcopal church located on the corner of Third and Pine Streets in Philadelphia, Pennsylvania, United States. It opened for worship on September 4, 1761 and served as a place of worship for many of the United States Founding Fathers during the period of the Continental Congresses. The building was designated a National Historic Landmark in 1996. The church remains an active parish; the current rector is the Rev. Laurie Wurm.

== Founding and erection ==
By the mid-1750s, Philadelphia's Christ Church was becoming overcrowded. About 60 parishioners organized themselves into a committee, headed by Colonel Jacob Duché Sr., to build a new church.

St. Peter's was founded in 1758 in newly settled Society Hill with the first service held on September 4, 1761. The land used was donated in 1757 by Governor Thomas and Richard Penn, sons of William Penn. The Penn family coat of arms can be seen above the wine-glass pulpit and sounding board.

St. Peter's was designed by Scottish architect/builder Robert Smith, who designed other noted buildings of the day, among them Carpenters' Hall and the tower of Christ Church in Philadelphia, and Nassau Hall at Princeton University. Much of the £5,000 expense needed to build St. Peter's was raised by lottery.

== Early history and architecture ==
St. Peter's and Christ Church were run jointly until 1832. William White, rector of both churches from 1779 until his death in 1836, was chaplain to the U.S. Congress during the Revolution, founder of the Episcopal Church of the United States in 1784, its first presiding bishop and first bishop of the Diocese of Pennsylvania.

Most of the church remains as it was in the eighteenth century. Smith designed it in the mid-Georgian auditory style, with the classical lines and clear glass windows of the Age of Reason. The pulpit and lectern are set at the opposite end of the aisle from the altar, projecting into the congregation, in order to focus attention on the Word of God, a reflection of the religious thought of the day. The original high-backed box pews, including Mayor Samuel Powel's box which George and Martha Washington often frequented, were designed to retain heat in winter. With the advent of central heating, many churches removed their box pews, but since St. Peter's services are conducted at both ends of the church, the original arrangement has been kept.

Slaves and servants of members sat on hard benches at the west end of the gallery. One of these slaves, Absalom Jones, became a highly respected leader of the free black community of Philadelphia. Together with Richard Allen, he founded the Free African Society, a non-denominational group. Later he founded the first African-American Episcopal Church, the African Church of St. Thomas, in 1794. He was ordained as the first black Episcopal priest in 1804.

The tower and steeple, designed by renowned Philadelphia architect William Strickland, were added in 1842 to house a chime of eight bells, donated by Benjamin Chew Wilcocks and cast at the Whitechapel Bell Foundry in London (which cast the Liberty Bell).

== Notable interments ==
Some of the notable people interred in St. Peter's churchyard include:

- Charles John Biddle (1819–1873), American soldier, lawyer, congressman, and newspaper editor, son of Nicholas Biddle
- Nicholas Biddle (1786–1844), American financier who served as the third and last president of the Second Bank of the United States
- Samuel Breck (1771–1862), served as a member of the U.S. House of Representatives for Pennsylvania's 1st congressional district from 1823 to 1825
- Gustavus Conyngham (1747–1819), officer in Continental Navy and privateer
- Alexander James Dallas (1759–1817), American statesman who served as the 6th United States Secretary of the Treasury from 1814 to 1816 under President James Madison
- George M. Dallas (1792–1864), American politician, 11th vice president of the United States from 1845 to 1849
- Stephen Decatur (1779–1820), American naval officer and Commodore, killed in duel
- Reverend Jacob Duché (1737–1798), rector of Christ Church, Philadelphia, first chaplain to the Continental Congress
- Samuel Fraunces (1722/23–1795), restaurateur and owner / operator of Fraunces Tavern in New York City
- Robert Graham (1841–1919), Medal of Honor recipient for heroism in action while serving aboard the USS Tacony
- John Hazelwood (1726–1800), Commodore in the Pennsylvania Navy and Continental Navy
- Joseph Reed Ingersoll (1786–1868), American lawyer and statesman
- William Jones (1760–1831), U.S. Secretary of the Navy during the War of 1812
- Robert Tait McKenzie (1867–1938), Canadian physician, educator, sculptor, athlete, soldier and Scouter, pioneer in physical therapy
- John Nixon (1733–1808), made the first public proclamation of the Declaration of Independence and read it from the steps of the Pennsylvania State House, now known as Independence Hall
- Charles Willson Peale (1741–1827), American painter, soldier, scientist, inventor, politician and naturalist
- Raphael Peale (1774–1825), first professional American painter of still-life
- Richard Peters (1743–1828), Pennsylvania lawyer, Continental Army soldier, Federalist politician, author and United States Federal Judge
- Eliza Lucas Pinckney (1722–1793), plantation owner who developed indigo as a cash crop
- Isaac Roach (1786–1848), fought in War of 1812, mayor of Philadelphia (1838–39)
- John Rutledge Jr. (1766–1819), United States Representative from South Carolina, Chief Justice of the Supreme Court of the United States
- James Searle (1730–1797), American merchant, Patriot, and delegate to the Continental Congress
- Raynor Taylor (1747–1825), English organist, music teacher, composer, and singer
- Thomas Wignell (1753–1803), English-born actor and theatre manager
- The chiefs of eight American Indian tribes, who died from Yellow fever while visiting Philadelphia in 1793 to meet with President George Washington, including:
  - Barkskin, Chief of the Penkishow Nation
  - La Gese, Chief of the Pottawatomie Nation
  - Apuatapea, Piankashaw War Chief
  - Bigigh Weautons, Wabash Nation War Chief
  - Toma, War Chief of the Pawaunia
  - Grand Joseph, Chief of the Veattonns Nation
  - Wapeteet, War Chief of Payagheya
  - Little Elk

== See also ==
- List of National Historic Landmarks in Philadelphia
- List of burial places of presidents and vice presidents of the United States
- National Register of Historic Places listings in Center City, Philadelphia
