= Constitution of Vermont =

American state constitution

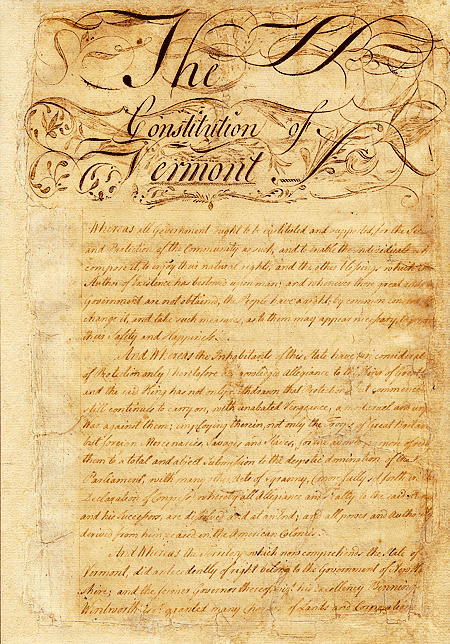
Vellum manuscript of the Constitution of Vermont, 1777. This constitution was amended in 1786, and replaced in 1793 following Vermont's admission to the federal union in 1791.

Marble tablet with a passage from the Constitution of Vermont in the Hall of Inscriptions at the Vermont State House.

The Constitution of the State of Vermont is the fundamental body of law of the U.S. state of Vermont, describing and framing its government. It was adopted in 1793 following Vermont's admission to the Union in 1791 and is largely based upon the 1777 Constitution of the Vermont Republic which was drafted at Windsor in the Old Constitution House and amended in 1786. At 8,295 words, it is the shortest U.S. state constitution. Largely unchanged since 1777, Vermont's Constitution is the only active state constitutional document to have been drafted and ratified outside of the United States.

== History ==
=== 1777 ===
From 1777 to 1791, Vermont was an independent country, often referred to in the present day as the Vermont Republic. During that time it was usually called the State of Vermont but sometimes called the Commonwealth of Vermont or the Republic of Vermont. Its first constitution, drafted in 1777, was among the most far-reaching in guaranteeing personal freedoms and individual rights. In particular, it banned adult slavery, saying male slaves became free at the age of 21 and females at 18. The 1777 constitution's Declaration of Rights of the Inhabitants of the State of Vermont anticipated the United States Bill of Rights by a dozen years. The first chapter, a "Declaration of Rights of the Inhabitants of the State of Vermont", is followed by a "Plan or Frame of Government" outlining the structure of governance. It provided that the governor would be elected by the freemen of the state, who could vote regardless of whether they owned property, that each town would be represented in the legislative assembly, that there would be a court of law in each county, and that the legislative assembly and the governor's council would jointly hold legislative power. Pennsylvania's Constitution inspired Vermont (and Georgia) to similarly establish a unicameral legislature.

=== 1786 ===
In 1786, the Constitution was extensively revised to establish a far greater separation of powers than what had prevailed under the 1777 Constitution. In particular, it forbade anyone to simultaneously hold more than one of certain offices, including those of judges, legislators, members of the governor's council, the governor, and the surveyor-general. It also provided that the legislature could no longer function as a court of appeals nor otherwise intervene in cases before the courts, as it had often done.

The 1786 Constitution continued in effect when, in 1791, Vermont made the transition from independence to the status of one of the states of the Union. In particular, the governor, the members of the governor's council, and other officers of the state, including judges in all courts, simply continued their terms of office that were already underway.

=== 1793 ===
The 1793 Constitution was adopted two years after Vermont's admission to the Union and continues in effect, with various later amendments, to this day. It eliminated all mention of grievances against King George III and against the State of New York. In 1790, New York's legislature finally renounced its claims that Vermont was a part of New York, the cessation of those claims being effective if and when Congress decided to admit Vermont to the Union.

Vermont held constitutional conventions in 1777, 1786, 1793, 1814, 1822, 1828, 1836, 1843, 1850, 1857, and 1870.

== Council of Censors ==
"In order that the freedom of this Commonwealth may be preserved inviolate" the 1777 constitution established a Council of Censors. This body consisted of thirteen elected members, chosen every seven years, but not from the Council or General Assembly. They were to check that "the legislative and executive branches of government have performed their duty as guardians of the people". They also had the power to call a convention, if needed, to amend the constitution. This council had been based on a similar element of the Pennsylvania Constitution of 1776.

In 1786, the constitution was amended with language proposed by the 1785 Council of Censors, their first meeting, and adopted by the 1786 Constitutional Convention. The section on the Council of Censors remained generally unchanged, with only an added clarification of scope.

In 1793, the constitution was amended with language proposed by the 1792 Council of Censors and adopted by the 1793 Constitutional Convention. The Council now had the "power to send for persons, papers, and records".

In 1870, the constitution was amended with language proposed by the 1869 Council of Censors, their last meeting, and adopted by the 1870 Constitutional Convention. The Council of Censors was abolished and replaced by a new procedure to amend the constitution.

== Amending the constitution ==
The Vermont Constitution, Chapter 2, Section 72 establishes the procedure for amending the constitution. The Vermont General Assembly, the state's bi-cameral legislature, has the sole power to propose amendments to the Constitution of Vermont. The process must be initiated by a Senate that has been elected in an "off-year", that is, an election that does not coincide with the election of the U.S. president. An amendment must originate in the Senate and be approved by a two-thirds vote. It must then receive a majority vote in the House. Then, after a newly elected legislature is seated, the amendment must receive a majority vote in each chamber, first in the Senate, then in the House. The proposed amendment must then be presented to the voters as a referendum and receive a majority of the votes cast.

== 1994 revision to gender-neutral language ==
In 1994 voters approved changing Vermont's constitution to read "persons" rather than "men".

== See also ==
- Impeachment in Vermont
