= William Dean (clergyman) =

Irish clergyman (1719–1748)

Rev. William Dean (1719 - July 9, 1748) was an Irish born Presbyterian clergyman and Evangelist Old Side minister who was best known as “the apostle of Virginia." In 1745 he became one of the first ministers to lead revivals to slaves, Native Americans and poor farmers in the Virginia Valley including at Rockbridge, Augusta County, and the James River. Upon his death, Samuel Davies resumed his work in Virginia from 1748 - 1749.

== Early life ==
Dean was born in Ballymena, Ireland to William Dean and Sarah Campbell, and the cousin of Joseph Deane who served Ireland as Chief Baron of the Irish Exchequer, whose father-in-law was John Parker, was Archbishop of Dublin and Primacy of Ireland.

In 1739, Dean and his family, including his one-year-old son Joseph Dean, immigrated to Philadelphia where his father had received permission to receive them. Dean was trained at the Log College under William Tennent, who was ordained by the Church of Ireland before migrating to Philadelphia in 1718. Dean attended Log College and was their 6th alumnus, and was licensed by the New Brunswick Presbytery on October 13, 1742, and ordained at Brandywine Manor in Chester, Pennsylvania in May 1745. He gave the sermon during Samuel Davies licensing ceremony as a clergyman, and was a close friend.

On January 22, 1747, Dean purchased 265 acres for £11 from Benjamin Borden. The transaction records Dean's name and address as, "Rev. William Dean, of Brandywine Manor and Chester County in Pennsylvania" which was part of 92,100 grant; and corner to Robert Huston and John Gray, on Mill Creek. John Gray, also from Ireland, was a member of the Timber Ridge Church in Rockbridge where Rev. Dean preached.

== Affiliated churches ==
According to the American Antiquarian Society which maintained a record of all clergyman from 1628 - 1776 in the Middle Colonies, William Dean was listed as a minister in: Warwick (Bucks) Neshaminy Church, 1742–1743; Forks of the Delaware, Lehigh Valley, Pa., 1742–1743; Salisbury (Lancaster) Pa., Pequea Church, 1743–1744; Forks of the Delaware, Lehigh Valley, Pa., Oct. 1744–1745; Cold Spring (Cape May) N.J., 1744–1745; Cohansey (Cumberland) N.J., 1744–1745; Greenwich (Cumberland) N.J., 1744-May 1745; Timber Ridge and Forks of the James (Rockbridge) Va., 1745–1746; Forks of the Delaware, Lehigh Valley, Pa, 1746–1747, Timber Ridge and Forks of the James (Rockbridge) Va., 1747–1748; and Forks of the Delaware, Lehigh Valley, Pa, 1748.

== Ministry ==
Dean was licensed to preach by the Presbytery of New Brunswick on October 13, 1742. His ministry involved arduous journeys, often covering several hundred miles on horseback. His itineraries included preaching at Neshaminy, Delaware Forks, Cohansie (Fairfield), Cape May (Cold Spring), and Rockbridge (Augusta County). Despite harsh conditions, he was known for his dedication to his congregations.

From May 1745 until his death, Dean was listed as the third pastor at Brandywine Manor Presbyterian Church.

For sixteen years, there was no settled minister in Rockbridge. In August 1745, Dean and Eliab Bryam ventured to Rockbridge in Augusta County after requests for ministers in Virginia's far western settlements grew louder. Due to the large influx of Scotch-Irish in the Borden Grant, many immigrant settlers did not identify with the Anglicans. For over a year Dean lead revivals in many parts of Virginia to not only wealthy Planters, but small farmers, slaves, and Native Americans, which led Davies to call Dean the "apostle of Virginia" after his death. During this period another clergyman joined him, Alexander Craighead, who acquired land in the Borden Grant or on the South River. Dean lived on Brandywine Creek in Pennsylvania while Craighead resided on the Cowpasture near Millboro Springs. Dean would eventually purchase a tract in 1747 within the same Grant.

In 1746, church organization efforts were initiated by John Blair Sr. New Providence, Timber Ridge, Monmouth, and Falling Springs. However, these areas did not have a resident minister for another seven years. Dean would be called back to Pennsylvania in 1747. In 1748, the Synod of New York considered sending him back to Timber Ridge and the Forks of the James River, Virginia, but this did not come to fruition due to his declining health.

Upon his death he was buried next to John Blair, Samuel Blair, and William Tennent.
