= James Cannon (mathematician) =

Scottish-born American mathematician and political figure

James Cannon (1740–1782) was a Scottish-born American mathematician, and one of the principal draftsmen of the 1776 Constitution of the State of Pennsylvania.

== Biography ==
Born in Edinburgh in 1740, Cannon was educated at the University of Edinburgh and moved to Pennsylvania to continue his studies at The Academy and College of Philadelphia, now the University of Pennsylvania. He graduated with a B.A. in 1767 and returned in 1773 as a Professor of Mathematics, a position he held until his death in 1782.

During the American Revolution, Cannon was one of the leaders of a radical faction campaigning for independence, in opposition to Philadelphia's majority support for an accommodation with Britain. The radical group included Cannon, George Bryan, Timothy Matlack, Thomas Young and Thomas Paine.

Cannon was a founder of the Philadelphia Society for the Promotion of American Manufactures, which organized citizens of Philadelphia in making woolen, linen and cotton fabrics. According to Christopher Marshall's diary, Cannon was a leading organizer in private meetings held to select radical candidates for the 1776 elections to the Pennsylvania Provincial Assembly.

The moderate faction won a majority in the elections on May 1, 1776, but were outmaneuvered by the radicals, who successfully persuaded the Continental Congress to resolve that all local governments deriving their authority from the British Crown should be "totally suppressed." This resolution hastened the end of British authority in the United States and effectively undermined the Charter and Assembly of Pennsylvania.

On May 20, a public meeting of over 4,000 in the Philadelphia State House yard supported the resolution of Congress. The citizens called for a special constitutional convention to establish a new state government. The Provincial Assembly was denied any role in the formation of a new government and promptly voted itself out of existence.

On July 15, 1776, Cannon became a member of the Constitutional Convention of Pennsylvania, and was put in charge of drafting the instructions for Pennsylvania's delegates to Congress. The Convention made him a Justice of the Peace for Pennsylvania, and also enabled him to serve as a member of the Council of Safety from July 24, 1776, to December 4, 1777. Cannon is regarded as one of the two principal draftsmen of the Constitution of 1776.

Drawing on the language of the Declaration of Independence, the new constitution conferred detailed rights on citizens and enfranchised all tax-paying free men, who would vote in annual elections for a unicameral legislature. This radical constitution was replaced in 1790 by a more cautious document.

Cannon died on January 28, 1782, in Philadelphia.
