= Council of Censors =

Periodic constitutional review body in Pennsylvania (1776–1790)

Pennsylvania Council of Censors
Agency overview
- Formed: 1776
- Dissolved: 1790
- Jurisdiction: Commonwealth of Pennsylvania
- Headquarters: Philadelphia, Pennsylvania

The Pennsylvania Council of Censors was a constitutionally mandated review body created by the Pennsylvania Constitution of 1776 to examine whether the legislative, executive, and judicial branches had acted in conformity with the state constitution. Meeting every seven years, it was one of the earliest American institutions expressly charged with enforcing a written constitution against ordinary legislation. The council met only once, in 1783–1784, and was abolished by the Pennsylvania Constitution of 1790.

The council was empowered to inspect public records, censure officials, recommend repeal of unconstitutional statutes, and call a constitutional convention when necessary. Modern scholars describe it as a distinctive experiment in popular constitutional guardianship that prefigured later debates over judicial review.

== Origins and purpose ==
The Council of Censors emerged from the radical democratic theory underlying Pennsylvania’s 1776 constitution. Reformers sought to prevent legislative overreach and to ensure that the written constitution—understood as an expression of popular sovereignty—remained supreme over ordinary law. Unlike later judicial review, the council was a periodic, popularly elected body whose role was corrective and political rather than adjudicative. It was intended to provide a public accounting of constitutional violations and to recommend structural remedies, including calling a convention to revise the constitution.

== Composition and procedures ==
The 1776 constitution required that a council be elected every seven years for a one‑year session. Its powers included examining public records, summoning officers, censuring misconduct, and recommending repeal of statutes deemed unconstitutional. The council could also call a constitutional convention if it concluded that the government had departed from constitutional principles.

== Activities and notable petitions ==
The council met only once, in 1783–1784. Its surviving minutes document extensive debates over executive power, legislative conduct, and constitutional violations.

One of the most prominent petitions came from leaders of Philadelphia’s Jewish congregation (Mikveh Israel) on 23 December 1783. Figures including Gershom Seixas and Haym Salomon asked the council to address a religious‑test oath requiring belief in the Old and New Testaments, which excluded Jews from certain offices. Although the council did not act on the petition, the issue contributed to the broader debate that led to changes in Pennsylvania’s 1790 constitution and influenced discussions of religious tests during the drafting of the United States Constitution.

== Reception, influence, and abolition ==
Contemporaries sharply criticized the council as destabilizing and impractical. Delegates to the 1787 Federal Convention cited Pennsylvania’s constitution and the Council of Censors as cautionary examples of excessive legislative dominance and inadequate separation of powers.

The idea nevertheless influenced other states: Vermont adopted a similar Council of Censors in its 1777 constitution, explicitly drawing on Pennsylvania’s model.

By the late 1780s, political opposition to the council had grown, and the Pennsylvania Constitution of 1790 abolished the institution entirely. Historians continue to debate its significance: some view it as a failed experiment, while others see it as an important early attempt to institutionalize constitutional supremacy.
