= James Searle =

American politician

James Searle (c.1730—August 7, 1797) was an American merchant, Patriot, and delegate to the Continental Congress.

== Formative years and family ==
Searle was born in New York City, the son of Catherine Pintard and John Searle, but on coming of age, he moved to Madeira, where he engaged in business with his brother John for 16 years. Between 1753 and 1759, he made several trips to America, particularly Philadelphia. In 1762, he married Nancy Smith of Waterford, England.

== Career ==
Searle relocated to Philadelphia in 1765, where he continued working as a merchant and an agent for his brother's firm, accumulating great wealth. He signed the 1765 Non-Importation Agreement in which merchants pledged not to buy goods from England to protest the Stamp Act.

He was elected by Congress in 1776 a commissioner for a national lottery that partially funded the Revolutionary War from 1776 to 1778. He then represented Pennsylvania as a delegate to the Continental Congress in 1778. While serving as a delegate, Searle started a cane fight with Charles Thomson, the Secretary of the Congress, and claimed that Thomson had misquoted him in the official minutes. The altercation resulted in both men receiving slashes to the face.

Searle was a close friend of both John Adams and Benjamin Franklin.

== Death and interment ==
Searle died on August 7, 1797, in Philadelphia, where he was interred at St. Peter's Churchyard.
