= Forks of the Brandywine Presbyterian Church =

Coordinates: 40.0605°N 75.8095°W

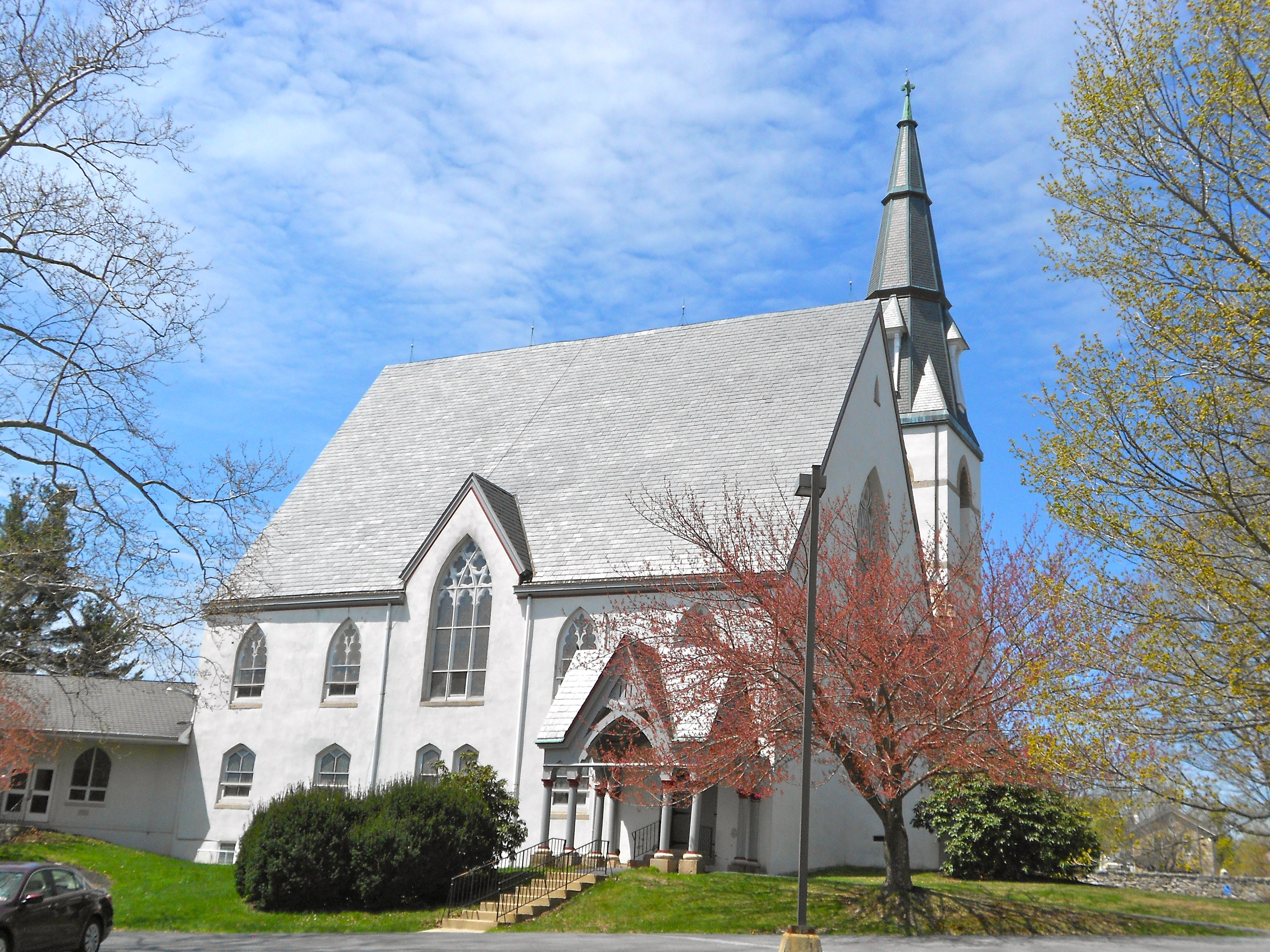

The Forks of the Brandywine Presbyterian Church, sometimes called Brandywine Manor Presbyterian Church, is a historic church located in West Brandywine Township, Chester County, Pennsylvania at 1648 Horseshoe Pike (US 322), about 4 miles southwest of the crossroads of Glenmoore.

== History ==
A log meetinghouse was built on the current site in 1734 by Scots and Scots-Irish settlers and the congregation was officially founded on September 26, 1735. Many of the members are believed to have come from the Reformed Presbyterian church in Octorara, Lancaster County, Pennsylvania. A stone church was built in 1761. It is thought that this was the largest stone building in Chester County at the time. The church burned in 1785 and was restored in 1787 with gifts from Benjamin Franklin, Benjamin Rush, and David Rittenhouse. This church was replaced by the current American gothic style church in 1875.

The first pastor was the Reverend Samuel Black. The Rev. John Carmichael served as pastor from 1761 until his death in 1785. Carmichael, according to the church website, was called the "Revolutionary Pastor," helped recruit soldiers for the American cause, preached before Congress and was "a counselor of General George Washington."

The pastors of the church include:

- Rev. Samuel Black, 1736–1741
- Rev. Adam Boyd (New Side), 1741–1758
- Rev. William Dean (Old Side), 1745–1748
- Rev. John Carmichael, 1761–1785
- Rev. Nathan Grier, 1787–1814
- Rev. J.N.C. Grier, 1814–1869, son of Nathan Grier
- Rev. William Heberton, 1869–1872
- Rev. John McColl, D.D. 1873–1888
- Rev. Hector Alexander McLean, 1888-1914
- Rev. H. Medley Price, 1915-1917
- Rev. Michael B. Bubb, 1910-1923
- Rev. Harry H. Kurtz, 1924-1952

The pulpit was filled by temporary supply, 1952-1958

- Rev. Roger Edmund Kellogg, 1958-1962
- Rev Harry Willis Weber, 1962-1965
- Rev. John D. Kauffroth, 1965-1977
- Rev. Robert G. Stier, 1978-1995
- Rev. James Andrew Curtis, 1997-2008
- Rev. Dr.John W. ("Will") Snyder, 2010–2018
- Rev. Wesley M. Grubb, 2020-Present

== Current building ==
In March 1874 the congregation decided to replace the church building. By September $10,000 was raised and the project was begun. The building was designed by Samuel Sloan and William Poole was selected as the main contractor. Construction of the foundation was begun on June 28, 1875 and the cornerstone was laid on August 7, 1875. After completing the stonework, Poole abandoned the contract in 1876 and others were called in to complete the work. Ulysses K. Beam supervised the carpentry, Samuel B. Buchannan the plastering, and S. B. Williams the painting. Everything except part of the tower was completed by December and the building was dedicated on December 17, 1876. The final cost, including the value of donated labor, was $21,000.

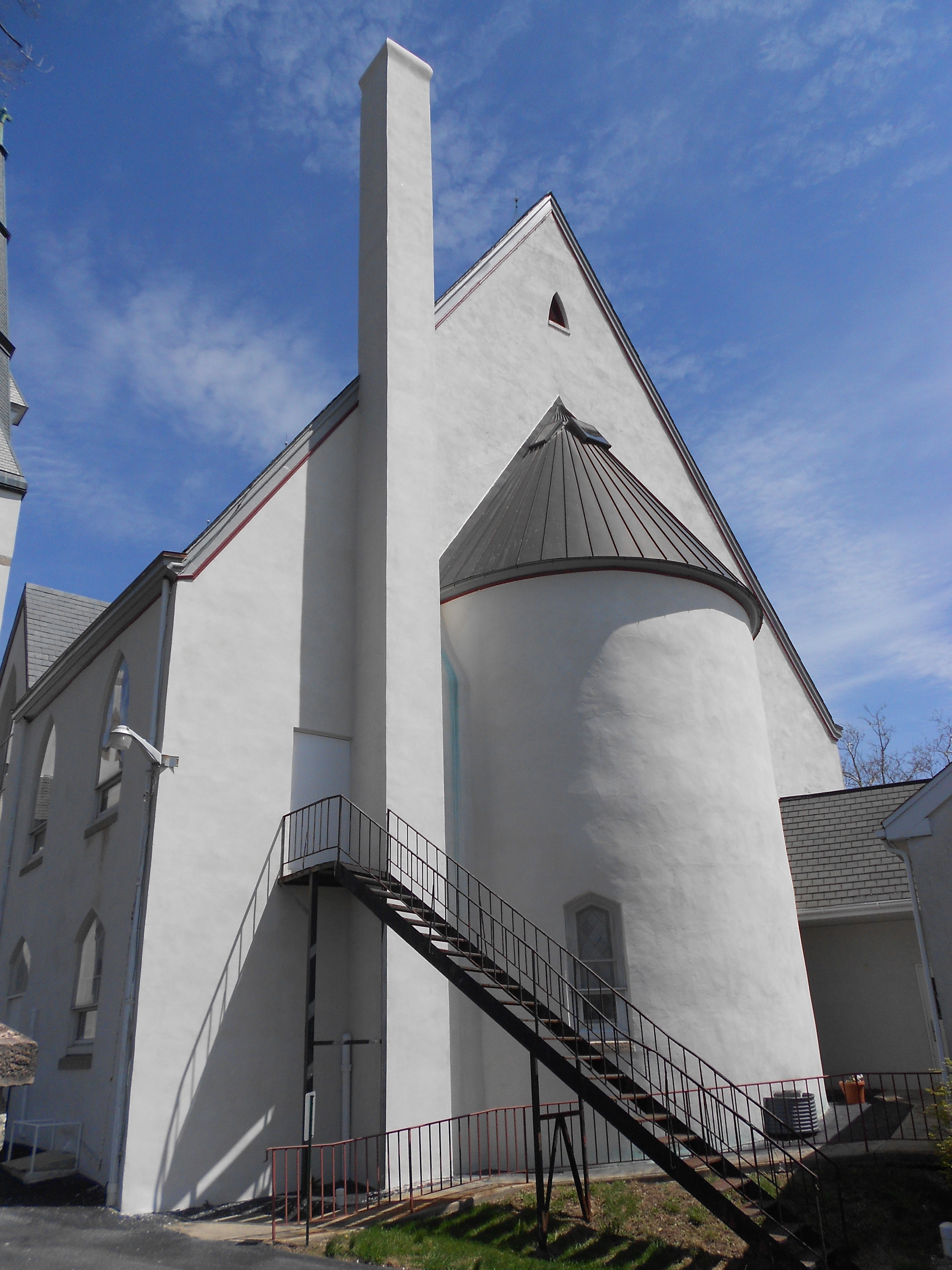
Rear of church

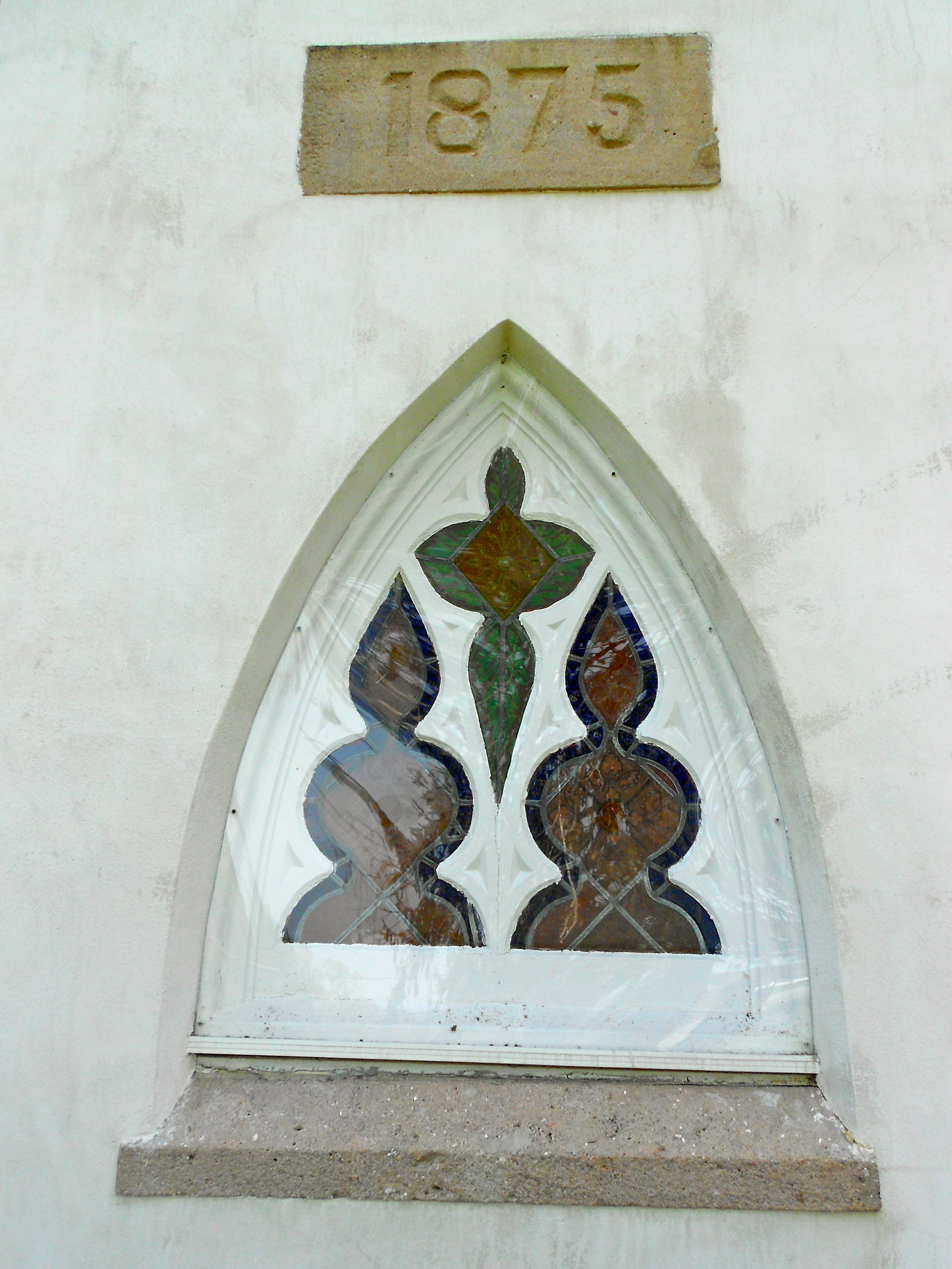
Window with 1875 datestone

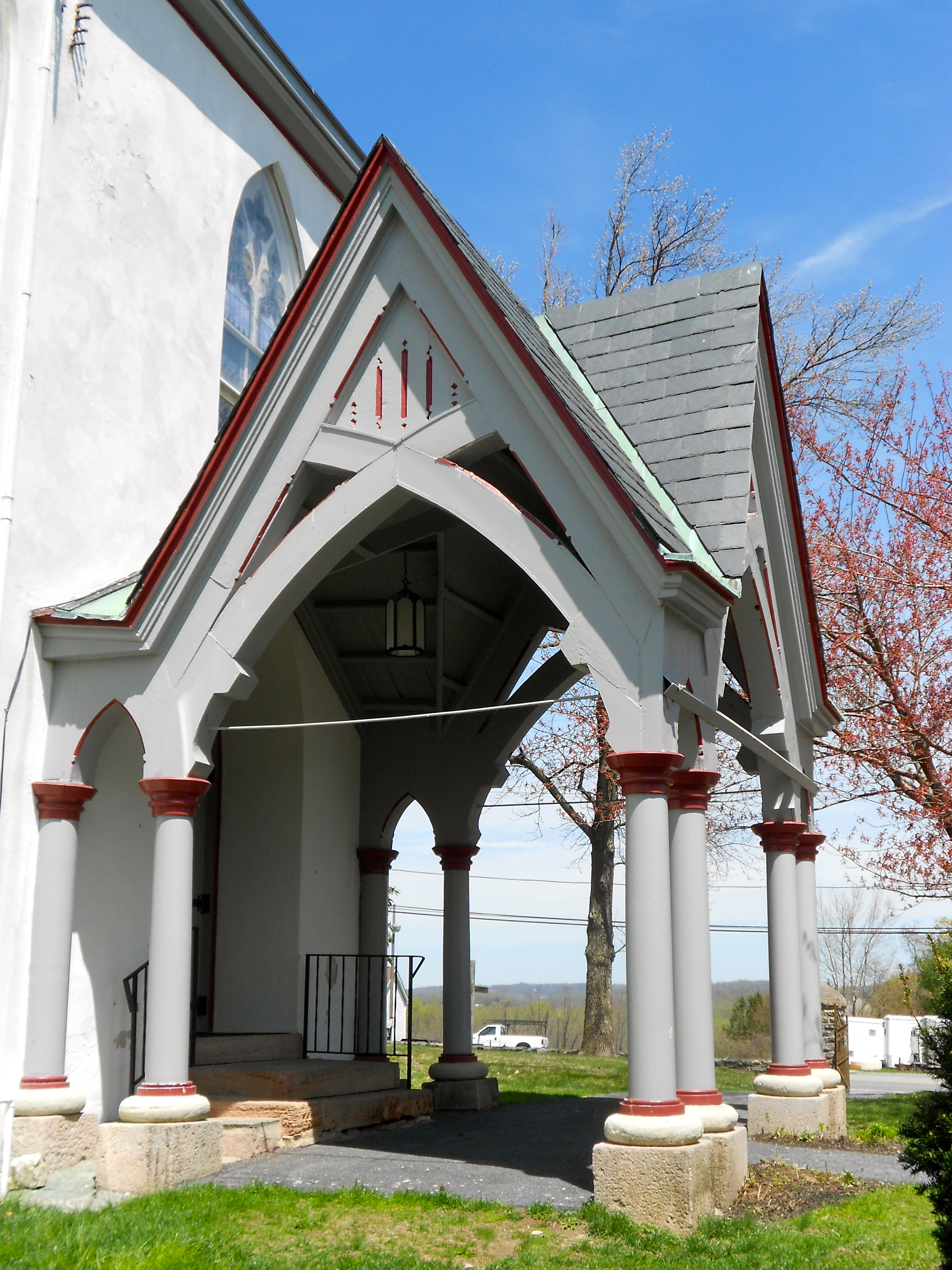
Carriage entrance
