= Worshipful Company of Carpenters =

Livery company of the City of London

Coordinates: 51.51660°N 0.08606°W

The Worshipful Company of Carpenters coat of arms

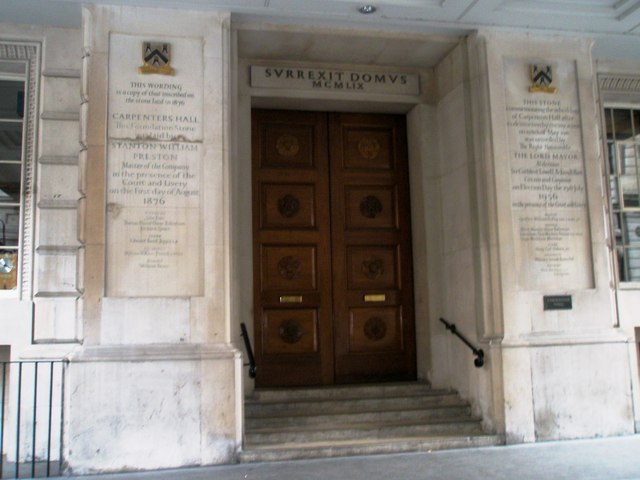
Entrance to Carpenters Hall in Throgmorton Avenue

The Worshipful Company of Carpenters is a livery company of the City of London. The Carpenters were traditionally different from a fellow wood-crafting company, the Worshipful Company of Joiners and Ceilers, in that carpenters utilised nails while joiners used adhesives to attach wood.

The organisation existed in 1271; it received a Royal Charter of incorporation in 1477. As is the case with most of the other livery companies, the Company no longer has a role as a trade association of tradesmen and craftsmen. Instead, it acts as a charitable institution and supports education in wood-related fields.

In 1767 the Company purchased an estate at Stratford, London. In 1886 it opened an evening institute on the Carpenters Estate there, offering classes in carpentry, joinery, plumbing, geometry, mechanical drawing and cookery. In 1891, the Carpenter's Institute had become a day school for boys. The school closed in 1905 when the local authority opened its own school.

The Company ranks twenty-sixth in the order of precedence of livery companies. The Company's motto is "Honour God". Its guild church is All Hallows-on-the-Wall, where the Company has held its annual elections for over 600 years. The livery hall, Carpenters Hall, is at Throgmorton Avenue; it is a Grade II listed building.

Founded in 1724, the Carpenters' Company of the City and County of Philadelphia was modelled after the Worshipful Company of Carpenters.
