= Benjamin Loxley =

American architect (1720–1801)

- Born: December 20, 1720; Wakefield, England
- Died: October 1801 (aged 80); Darby, Pennsylvania, U.S.
- Occupations: Carpenter-architect, master builder, investor
- Organization: Carpenters' Company of the City and County of Philadelphia
- Military career
- Allegiance: Province of Pennsylvania; United States
- Branch: Philadelphia Associators
- Service years: 1742–1780
- Rank: Major
- Conflicts: Battle of Red Bank; Battle of Brandywine

Benjamin Loxley, also known as Benjamin Lockley (December 20, 1720 – October 1801) was a Philadelphia carpenter-architect, master builder, investor and military leader in the American Colonial Period. He began his career by working as a carpenter-architect and renting out land outside the city. He then worked as a master builder and built various properties in the city. He invested in many schemes and was a member of the Carpenters' Company of the City and County of Philadelphia.

Loxley was a Patriot military leader and was engaged in several battles. He rose through the ranks and eventually became a major in command of artillery. He fought in battles under George Washington. He was taken as a prisoner of war when the British captured and overtook Philadelphia and eventually released in a prisoner exchange.

== Early life ==
Loxley was born in Wakefield, England, on December 20, 1720. He was the son of Benjamin Loxley and Elizabeth (Pullen). Loxley immigrated to America in 1734 to live with his uncle in Pennsylvania. His uncle then indentured him to W. J. Watkins for the carpenter's and cabinet making trades.

== Career ==
=== Construction business ===
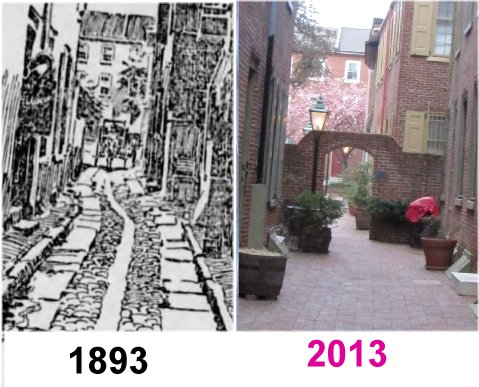
Loxley Place court entrance from Arch Street

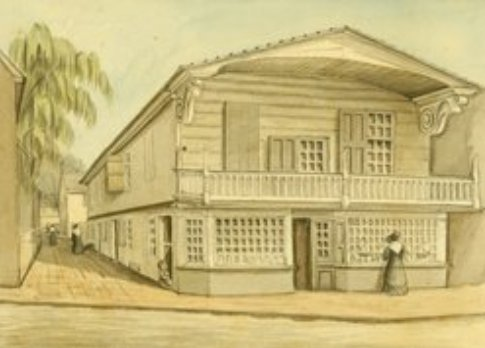
A depiction of Benjamin Loxley house in Philadelphia at 177 South Second Street.

Loxley built a home in Philadelphia around 1744 which became known as Loxley's Place. He constructed a second group of houses known as Loxley's Court. One of his houses was on 177 South Second Street and known as the Benjamin Loxley house.

Loxley then became a partner with carpenter William Henderson. He was a member of the Carpenters' Company of the City and County of Philadelphia with architects Thomas Nevell and Robert Smith. They purchased a lot on Chestnut Street for the Carpenters' Company and built the Carpenters' Hall there.

=== Military service ===
Pennsylvania did not have an official militia, since it had been founded by pacifist Quakers, and so prominent Pennsylvanians like Benjamin Franklin established a voluntary organization, known as the Philadelphia Associators, to help defend the province. Loxely had joined the Associators by 1742, and would serve for the next thirty years, primarily as an artillery officer. He trained recruits during King George's War (1744–1748). With the coming of the French and Indian War in 1754, Loxely was appointed captain lieutenant in the Associators. He received training in artillery from British officers and in turn trained other colonists.

In 1758, when British General John Forbes was preparing an expedition into western Pennsylvania to expel the French, he put Loxley in charge of military supplies stored in Philadelphia. Loxley did not see action in the French and Indian War, but in 1764, a frontier vigilante mob known as the Paxton Boys marched on Philadelphia. Loxley arranged his cannons and artillerymen in the streets while Franklin negotiated with the Paxton leaders, which ended the crisis.

With the coming of the American Revolution, one of Loxley's first acts was to turn over the city stores he was in charge to the Patriots. He was elected to the Philadelphia Committee of Safety in 1775. After news was received of the Battles of Lexington and Concord, the Philadelphia Associators was reorganized, with Captain Loxley placed in command of the 174 men of the 1st Company of the Artillery Battalion under Major Samuel Mifflin.

In July 1776, Loxley took his company in boats down the Delaware River to an engagement with British gunboats at the Battle of Red Bank. He was promoted to the rank of major in August 1776.

== Personal life ==
Loxley's great-grandson stated that Loxley was a friend of Benjamin Franklin, and that he provided a key to the No. 2 house in a courtyard of his houses at Loxley's Court to Franklin.

Loxley married Jane Watkins on March 28, 1743. The Loxley family bible's entries show that they had two sons, Benjamin Jr. (born June 6, 1746) and Abram (born January 16, 1750). Jane died on September 22, 1760, and he remarried on September 1, 1761, to Catherine Cox, the eldest child of John and Mary (Potts) Cox of Freehold, New Jersey. He had a total of twelve children with Catherine, five of which lived to adulthood. The name of their third child was Jane. Loxley died in October 1801. He was first buried in the First Baptist Church of Philadelphia and later reinterred in Mount Moriah Cemetery.

== Societies and clubs ==
- Member of Carpenters' Company of Philadelphia.
- Member of Committee of Safety in 1774–1776.
- Member of American Philosophical Society.
- Member of Pennsylvania Hospital.
