= Nicholas Lutz (military officer) =

Pennsylvania militia officer during the American Revolutionary War

Nicholas Lotz
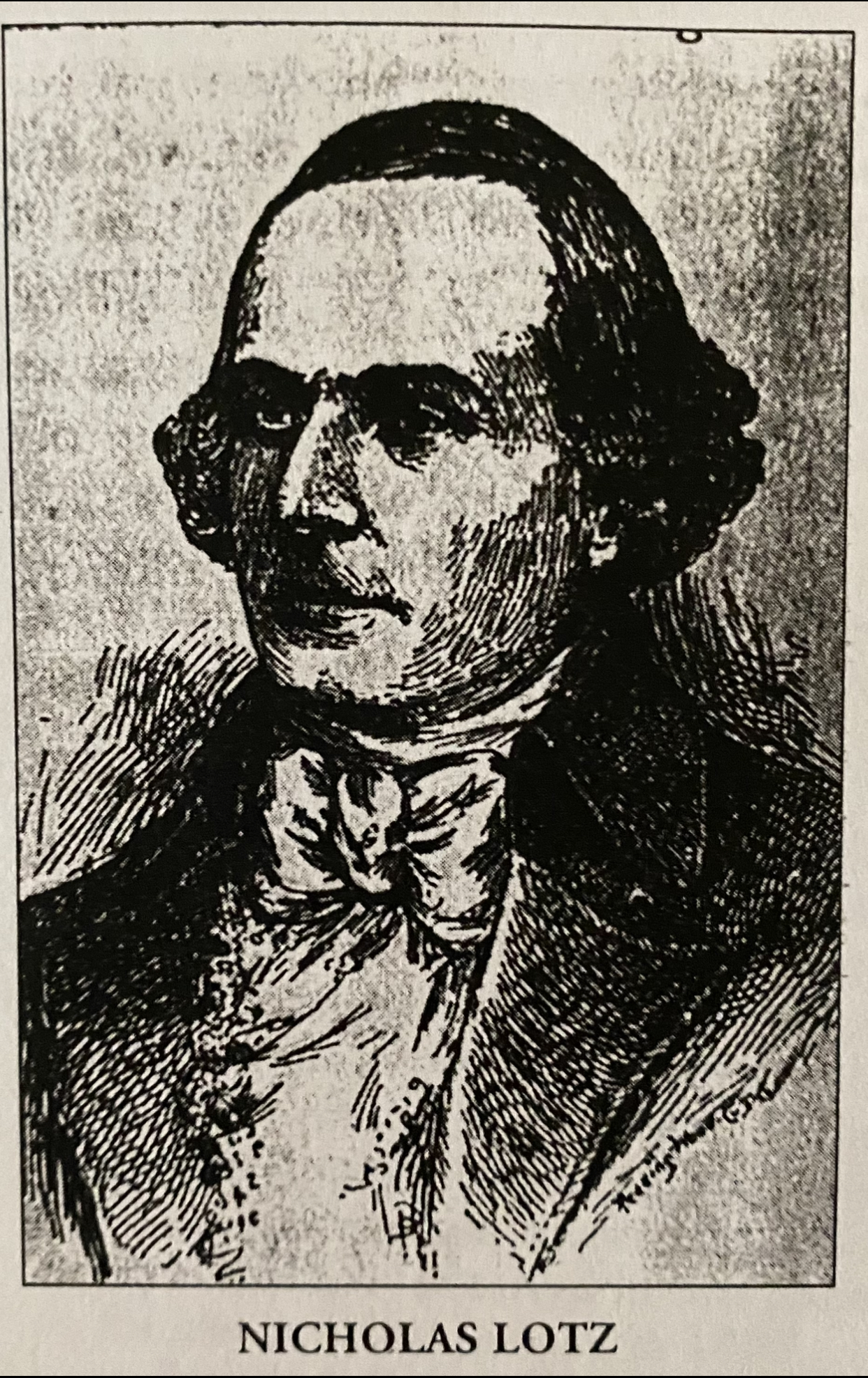
- Born: February 20, 1740; Germany
- Died: November 30, 1807 (aged 67); Reading, Pennsylvania, U.S.
- Resting place: Charles Evans Cemetery
- Other name: Nicholas Lutz
- Occupations: Military officer, politician
- Known for: Lieutenant colonel, Pennsylvania Militia (American Revolutionary War); member, Pennsylvania General Assembly

Nicholas Lotz, also spelled Lutz, (February 20, 1740 – November 28, 1807) was a Pennsylvania militia officer during the American Revolutionary War and later served in the Pennsylvania General Assembly as a representative of Berks County.

== Formative years ==
Lotz was born on February 20, 1740, in the Palatinate region in Germany. After emigrating with his family sometime around 1752, he settled in the western section of Berks County, Pennsylvania, where he married Rosina Meyer. Prior to the American Revolution, he relocated to Reading, Pennsylvania, where he became the owner of two mills at the mouth of the Wyomissing Creek.

== American Revolutionary War ==
At the outbreak of the American Revolution, Lotz was prominently identified with the patriotic movements at Berks County to the Provincial Conference, which assembled at Philadelphia in June 1776. Upon his return home, he took an active part in the enlistment of men. He was commissioned a lieutenant colonel, and participated in the movement of the "Flying Camp" Regiment from Philadelphia to New York, where he was engaged in the Battle of Long Island and taken prisoner. He was admitted to parole within certain bounds on April 16, 1777, and exchanged on September 10, 1779.

In 1780, he was appointed commissioner of Forage, and while serving this appointment he purchased a large amount of supplies for the army, consisting of flour, oats, cattle, sheep, etc. A receipt book of his still extant in 1893, shows receipts for money paid out from August 12, 1780, to December 5, 1781, aggregating $202,033. He advanced large sums of money from his own purse for the government, but was never fully repaid.

Lotz represented Berks County in the Pennsylvania General Assembly from 1784 to 1786, and again from 1790 to 1794. He then filled the appointment of associate judge of the county from 1795 to 1806, having succeeded Colonel Joseph Hiester in that office.

Lotz died in Reading, Pennsylvania, on November 28, 1807. His grave is located at Reading's Charles Evans Cemetery.
