= Carpenters' Hall =

- U.S. National Register of Historic Places
- U.S. National Historic Landmark
- U.S. Historic district – Contributing property
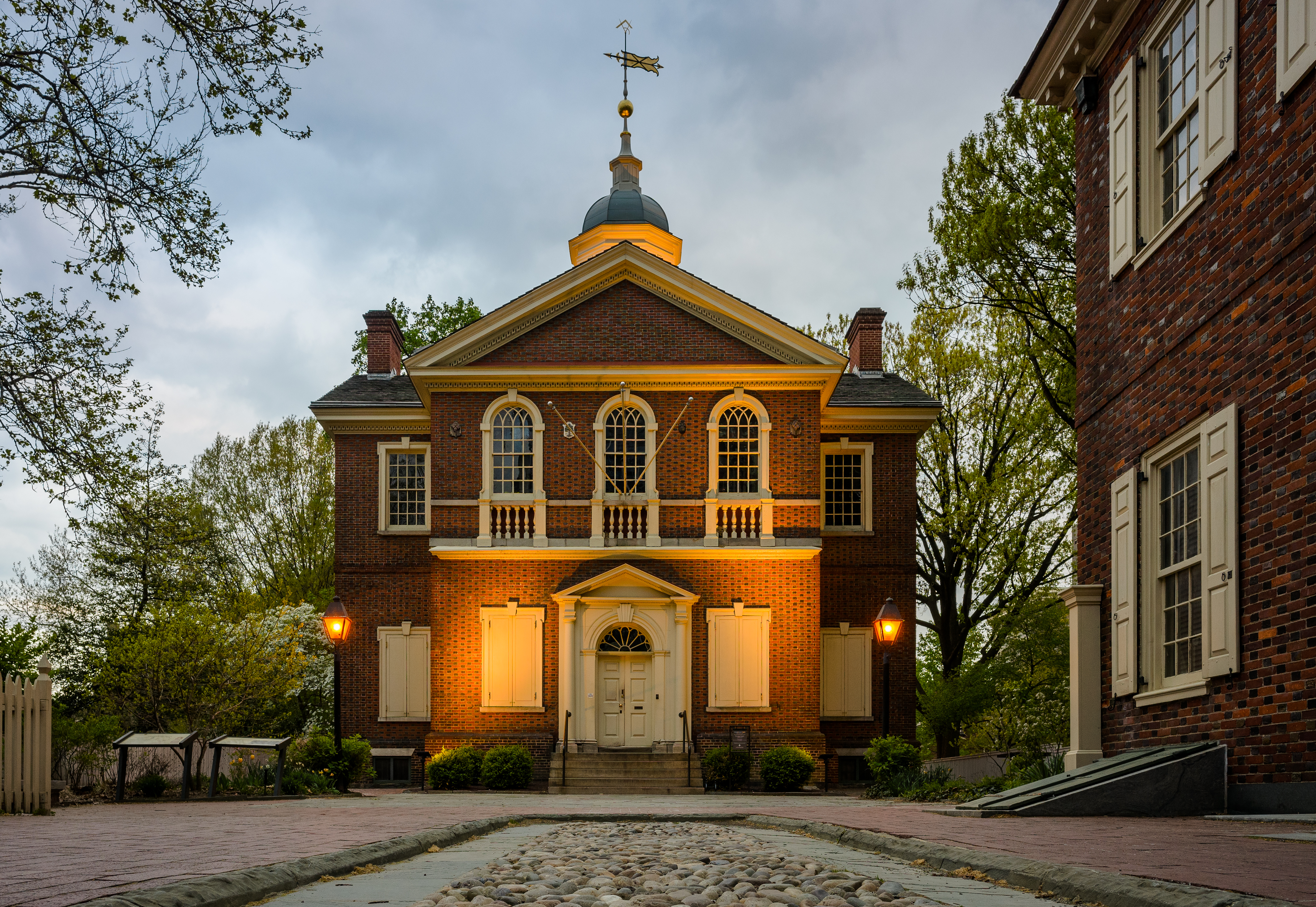
- Carpenters' Hall in May 2015
- Location: 320 Chestnut Street; Philadelphia, Pennsylvania, U.S.
- Coordinates: 39.9481°N 75.1472°W
- Built: 1775
- Architect: Robert Smith
- Architectural style: Georgian
- NRHP reference No.: 70000552

Significant dates
- Added to NRHP: April 15, 1970
- Designated NHL: April 15, 1970

Carpenters' Hall, in Independence National Historical Park in Philadelphia, Pennsylvania, is the official birthplace of the Commonwealth of Pennsylvania and a key meeting place for colonial delegates during the early part of the American Revolution. Completed in 1775, the two-story brick meeting hall was built for and is still privately owned by the Carpenters' Company of the City and County of Philadelphia, the country's oldest extant craft guild.

The First Continental Congress met at the building in 1774 and passed and signed the Continental Association. In June 1776, it was where the Pennsylvania Provincial Conference officially declared the Province of Pennsylvania's independence from the British Empire and established the Commonwealth of Pennsylvania, mobilized the Pennsylvania militia for the American Revolutionary War, set up the machinery for the Pennsylvania Provincial Convention from July 15 to September 28, 1776, which framed the Pennsylvania Constitution of 1776 and enabled the Declaration of Independence to be written and ultimately adopted. It was briefly occupied in 1777 by the British Army during the war.

The site was designated a National Historic Landmark on April 15, 1970. On November 30, 1982, the Pennsylvania Historical and Museum Commission succeeded in passing Pennsylvania General Assembly 166(R) HR180 to recognize "Carpenters' Hall as the official birthplace of the Commonwealth of Pennsylvania".

The building is free to enter and receives 120,000 visitors per year. Numerous dignitaries have visited Carpenters' Hall, including Chief Justice of the United States Warren E. Burger, King Carl XVI Gustaf and Queen Silvia of Sweden, Czech Republic president Václav Havel, Latvian president Guntis Ulmanis, Texas governor and future U.S. president George W. Bush, and Governor of Pennsylvania Tom Ridge.

== History ==
=== 18th century ===
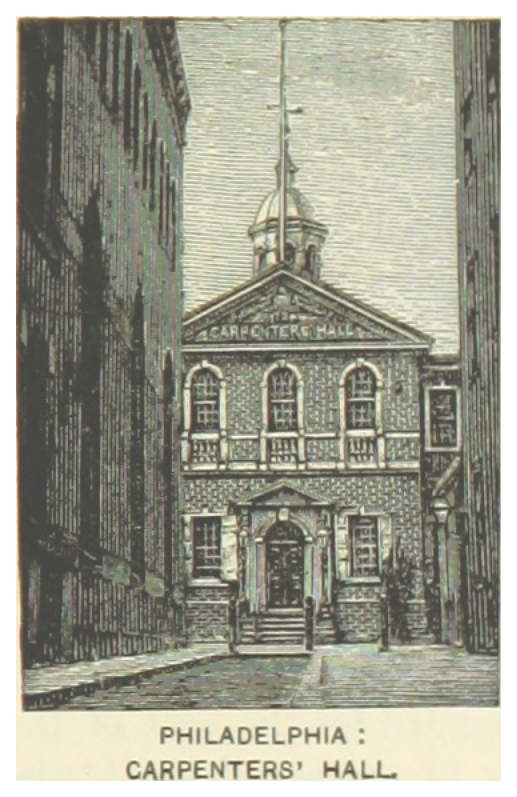
An 1891 illustration of Carpenters' Hall in Philadelphia

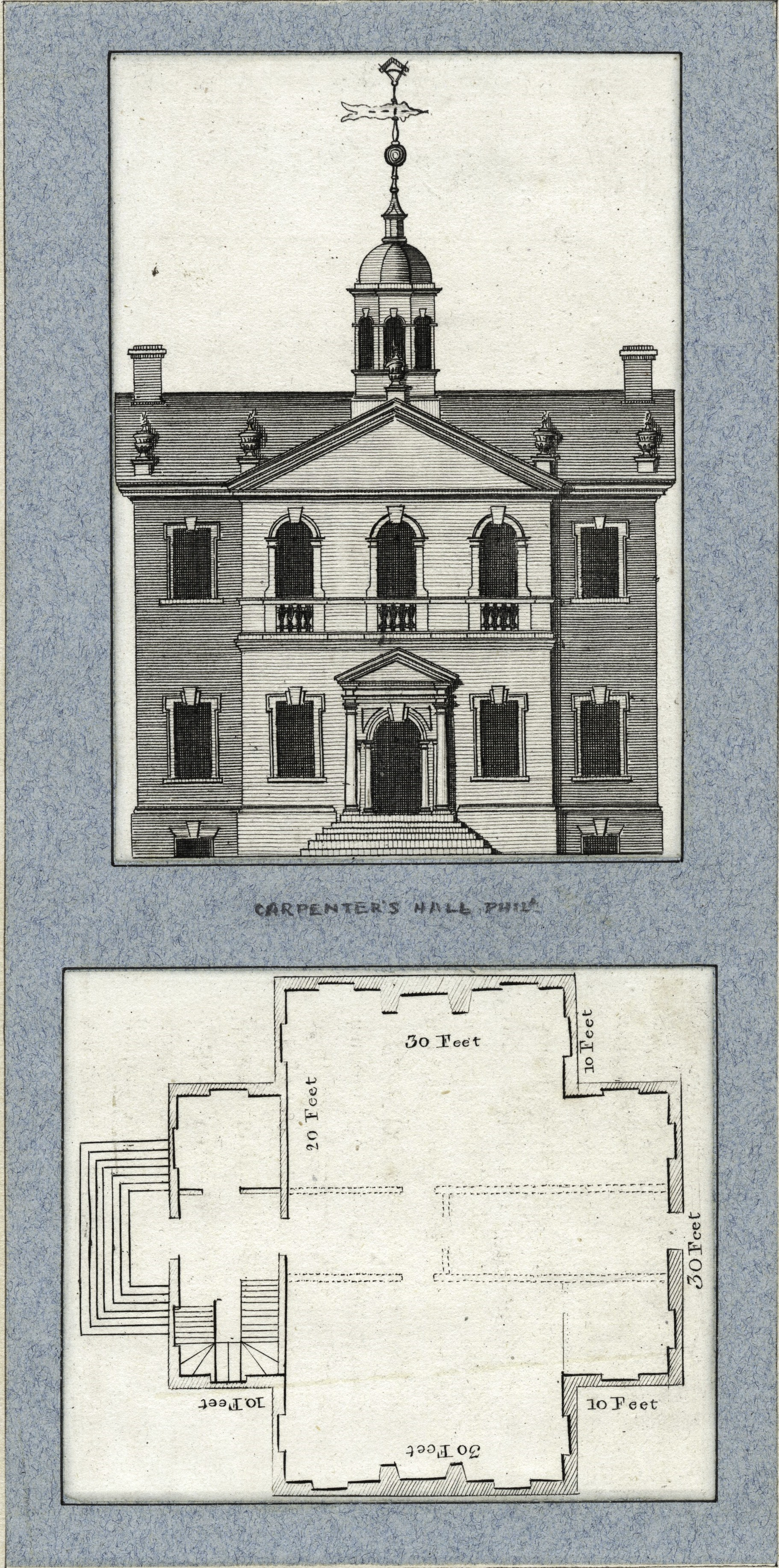
Carpenters' Hall

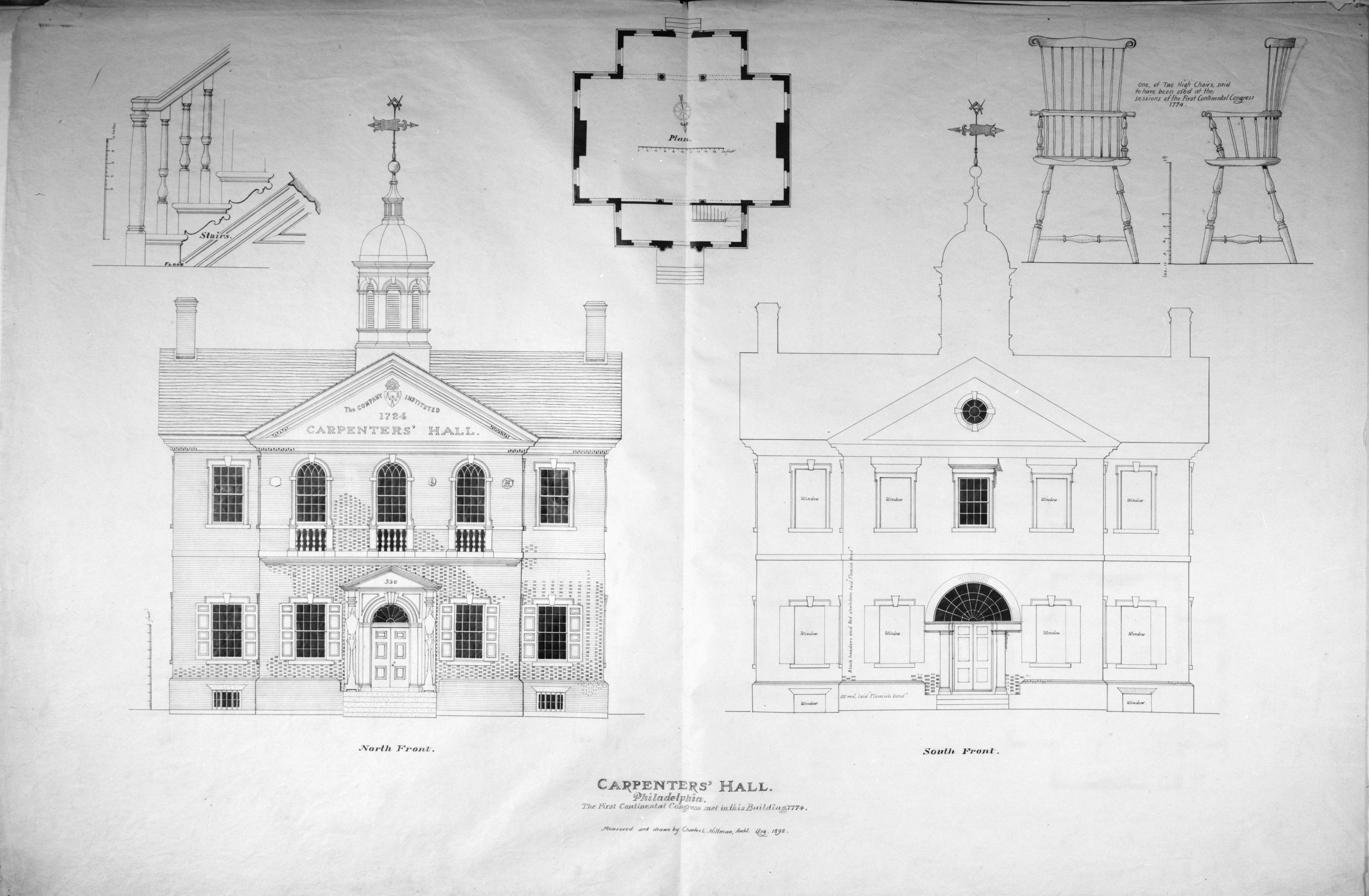
Historic American Buildings Survey's elevation and plans, circa 1898

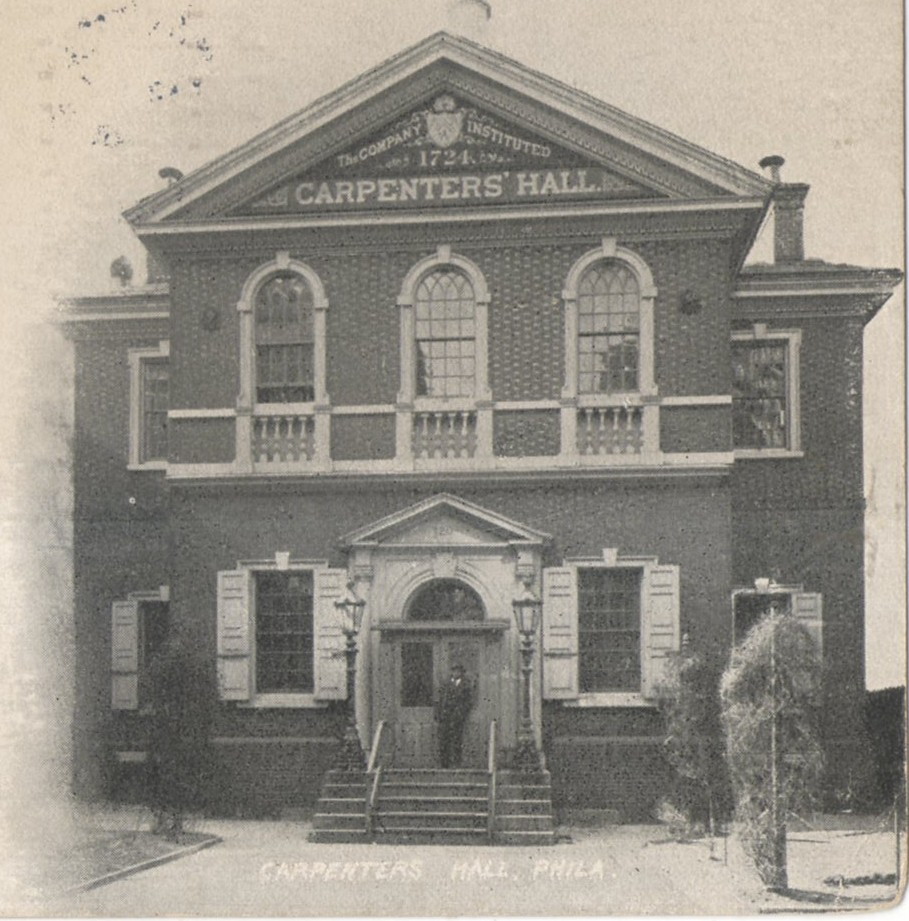
A 1905 postcard of Carpenters' Hall

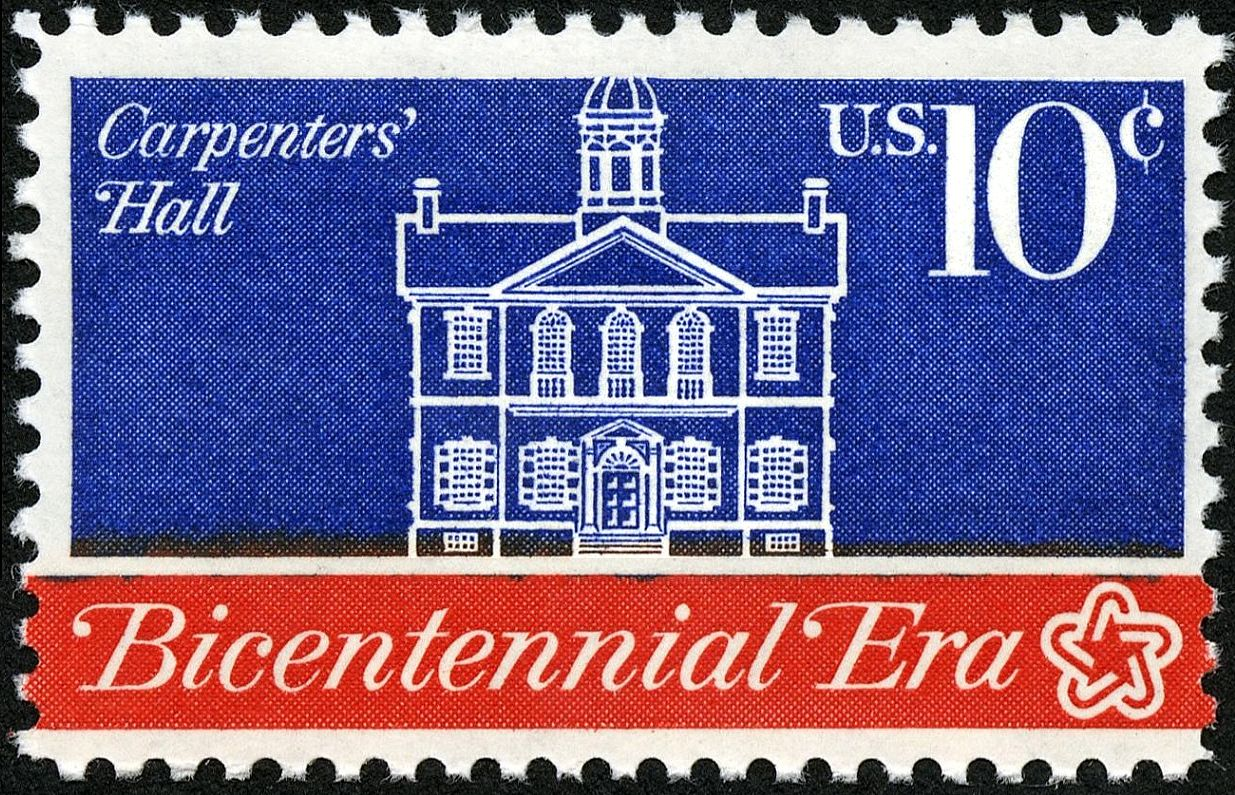
Carpenters' Hall commemorative stamp issued on the 200th anniversary in 1974

The land on which Carpenters' Hall is built was purchased on behalf of the Carpenters' Company of Philadelphia in 1768 by Benjamin Loxley, Robert Smith, and Thomas Nevell. The hall was designed by Robert Smith in the Georgian style based on both the town halls of Scotland, where Smith was born, and the villas of Palladio in Italy. The carpenters' guild held their first meeting there on January 21, 1771, and continued to do so until 1777 when the British Army captured Philadelphia. On April 23, 1773, which was Saint George's Day, it was used for the founding meeting of the St. George Society of Philadelphia.

The First Continental Congress of the Thirteen Colonies of North America met at Carpenters Hall from September 5 to October 26, 1774. The First Continental Congress resolved to ban further imports of slaves and to discontinue the slave trade within the colonies, a step toward phasing out slavery in British North America. It also passed and signed the Continental Association.

In June 1776, meeting at Carpenters' Hall, the Pennsylvania Provincial Conference declared the Province of Pennsylvania's independence from the British Empire and established the Commonwealth of Pennsylvania, mobilized the Pennsylvania militia for the American Revolutionary War, set up the machinery for the Pennsylvania Provincial Convention from July 15 to September 28, 1776, which framed the Pennsylvania Constitution of 1776.

In the Second Continental Congress, which met inside present-day Independence Hall in Philadelphia, delegates established the Continental Army and appointed George Washington as its commander-in-chief in 1775. The following year, in July 1776, the Second Continental Congress unanimously adopted the Declaration of Independence, which Thomas Jefferson largely authored from his second-floor apartment on Market Street within walking distance of Carpenters' Hall. From September 1777 to June 1778, the hall and all of Philadelphia was occupied by the British Army during the Revolutionary War.

The meeting hall served as a hospital for both British and American troops in the Revolutionary War, and other Philadelphia institutions have held meetings in Carpenters' Hall, including Ben Franklin's Library Company of Philadelphia, the American Philosophical Society, and the First and Second Banks of the United States.

Carpenters Hall was the site of the 1798 Bank of Pennsylvania heist.

=== 19th century ===
The federal Custom House in Philadelphia was located at Carpenters' Hall between 1802 and 1819, except for a brief interruption between January and April 1811.

=== 20th century ===
In 1970, Carpenters' Hall was declared a National Historic Landmark.

On November 30, 1982, the Pennsylvania Historical and Museum Commission passed Pennsylvania General Assembly 166(R) HR180 to recognize Carpenters' Hall as the official birthplace of Pennsylvania.

=== 21st century ===
In 2022, a fire in the basement of the building was suspected to be arson; at the time, the building were closed for renovations.

== Construction and design ==
The Carpenters Company was founded in 1724, but had no meeting house of their own, resorting to rented tavern rooms for their meetings. Carpenters Company members finally selected a new building site in 1768 on Chestnut Street, a few hundred feet from Benjamin Franklin's home. Robert Smith submitted the plans for the design, but did not supervise the construction of the hall. The decision to proceed with construction was made on January 30, 1770. Construction was completed in August 1774.

== Inscription ==
Over the south door of Carpenters' Hall reads the following inscription:

Within these Walls Henry, Hancock, & Adams inspired the Delegates of the Colonies With Verve and Sinew for the Toils of War

— Inscription over south doorway of Assembly Room

== See also ==
- Continental Association, the 1774 founding document and system created by the First Continental Congress for implementing a trade boycott with Great Britain
- List of National Historic Landmarks in Philadelphia
- National Register of Historic Places listings in Center City, Philadelphia
- Founding Fathers of the United States
