= Fort Piper =

American Revolution-era settler's fort in Pennsylvania, U.S.

Coordinates: 40.1295°N 78.3302°W

Fort Piper was an American Revolution Era settler's fort in the Yellow Creek Valley in Bedford County, Pennsylvania. The fort was built under the direction of John Piper (1729–1816), who was a member of the Pennsylvania militia.

== Background ==
In around 1771 Colonel John Piper settled in the Yellow Creek Valley where, upon the south end of Black Oak Ridge, he constructed a log fort for the protection of himself and the local settlers. He came to the area as Lieutenant Colonel of the county during the Revolutionary War and was active in the protection of the local settlements from hostile Indian attacks. A period of time after the construction of the wooden fort, Colonel Piper constructed a two story stone dwelling and it is said that settlers fled there for refuge during hostilities. This became known as Fort Piper and still stands of this present day in remarkable condition.

== Location and construction ==
The site of this fort is in Pennsylvania's Hopewell Township six miles northwest of Everett and in the center of Yellow Creek Valley.
