= Carpenters' Company of the City and County of Philadelphia =

Oldest United States craft guild (1724)

Coordinates: 39.948124°N 75.147205°W

The Carpenters’ Company of the City and County of Philadelphia
- Company seal
- Founded: 1724; 302 years ago
- Headquarters: Carpenters' Hall, 320 Chestnut Street, Philadelphia, Pennsylvania, U.S.
- Members: Approximately 200
- Website: Official website

The Carpenters' Company of the City and County of Philadelphia, founded in 1724, is the oldest extant craft guild in the United States. The Company consists of nearly 200 prominent Philadelphia-area architects, building contractors and structural engineers, and has had over 900 members over its three centuries of existence. The Company built, owns, and continues to operate Carpenters' Hall in Philadelphia's Independence National Historical Park. In 1774 the Hall served as the site of the First Continental Congress.

== History ==
Although it was founded in 1724, The Carpenters’ Company traces its roots back to the very beginning of Philadelphia. Its earliest members arrived with William Penn in 1682 and took part in constructing the first homes and public spaces in what are now the Old City and Society Hill neighborhoods of Center City, Philadelphia. These master builders, many of whom began their careers in carpentry before also becoming skilled in both construction and architectural design, banded together to create a guild to support their industry.

The guild (then referred to as a "Company") was modeled after the Worshipful Company of Carpenters of London. Many early members were Quakers, whose beliefs influenced the Company's mission to promote fair business dealings, expand educational opportunities and support members in times of need.

In Building Early America, author Roger W. Moss writes, "The generation of Carpenters that emerged in the early eighteenth century were leaders of the community, men of some wealth and position who, if not of the first rank, were in daily social and political association with city and provincial leaders." With strong connections to major civic leaders, early members were able to play instrumental roles in the design and construction of such important colonial era Philadelphia buildings as Christ Church, Independence Hall, City Tavern, and Old Swedes' Church (Gloria Dei). This involvement in civic life extended to politics as well, as virtually the entire Company membership later actively supported the American Revolution, and most of the members volunteered to serve in the American army.

In 1770, after decades in existence, the Company voted to build a meeting space and headquarters. That project would become Carpenters' Hall, which just months after completion in 1774 came to serve as the meeting ground not just for the First Continental Congress, but also later for Benjamin Franklin's negotiations with French spy Julien Alexandre Achard de Bonvouloir and the site for Franklin's Library Company. Carpenters' Hall itself was designed and built by Carpenters' Company member Robert Smith, who today is acknowledged as "one of the most prominent and skilled architect/builders in colonial America."

As Philadelphia grew and prospered in the 19th and 20th centuries, Carpenters' Company members continued their involvement in the creation of important public buildings both in and outside of Philadelphia. Philadelphia City Hall, Reading Terminal, and more recent projects at prestigious centers of higher education such as the University of Pennsylvania, Bryn Mawr College, and Temple University were all shaped by Carpenters’ Company members.

== Company library ==
The Carpenters' Company sponsored a school of architecture in the 19th century for which they assembled an impressive collection of architectural pattern books for the use of members, their apprentices and the students. This collection survives intact and constitutes one of the finest pre-Civil War architectural libraries in the United States. Due to fragility of the rare items, the library is not open to the public except by special permission.

== Today ==
Over 300 years old, the Carpenters' Company remains an active and influential organization. It operates as a 501(c)(3) Public Charity. In 2024 it claimed total revenue of $1,886,690 and total assets of $3,925,124.

In addition to preserving and maintaining Carpenters' Hall, the Company serves as an important forum for cooperation amongst many of Philadelphia's most successful architects, structural engineers and builders. The Company also has a scholarship program supporting students pursuing careers in architecture, structural engineering, or construction management/engineering.

Candidates for membership of the Carpenters' Company must be nominated and elected by current members.

== See also ==
- Benjamin Loxley
- Worshipful Company of Carpenters

== Notes ==
1. Charles E. Peterson, "Carpenters' Hall" Historic Philadelphia (Philadelphia: American Philosophical Society, 1953), pp. 96–128 2. Roger W. Moss. "Carpenters' Hall," Historic Landmarks of Philadelphia (Philadelphia: University of Pennsylvania Press, 2008), pp. 42–47 3. Roger W. Moss, "The Origins of The Carpenters' Company of Philadelphia," in Charles E. Perterson (ed), Building Early America (Radnor, PA: Chilton Book Company, 1976), pp. 35–53
