= Joseph Dean (merchant) =

Irish-American merchant (1738–1793)

Joseph Dean Esq.
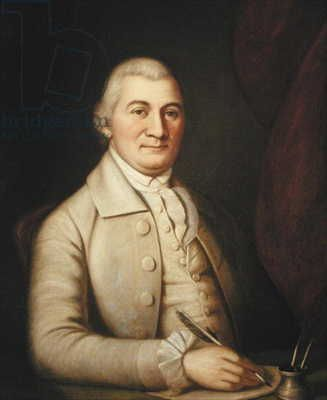
- Portrait by Charles Willson Peale (private collection)
- Born: August 10, 1738; Ballymenagh, Antrim, Ireland
- Died: September 9, 1793 (aged 55); Philadelphia, Pennsylvania, United States
- Spouse(s): Frances McCracken (d. 1776); Hannah Boyd (d. 1823)
- Military career
- Allegiance: United States of America
- Branch: Continental Army; Pennsylvania Militia
- Service years: 1775–1783
- Rank: Colonel
- Units: 4th Battalion, Philadelphia City Militia
- Commands: 6th Battalion, Philadelphia City Militia Second Troop, Philadelphia City Cavalry
- Conflicts: American Revolutionary War
- Awards: Recognized by Robert Morris for financial contributions to the war effort
- Other work: Signed Pennsylvania non-importation resolutions (1765); Delegate in the vote for independence (1776); Pennsylvania Board of War (1777–1780); Auditor of Public Accounts (1781); Warden of the Port of Philadelphia (1781); Auctioneer, City of Philadelphia (1790)

Joseph Dean, Esq. (August 10, 1738 – September 9, 1793) was an Irish-born American merchant, Colonel, attorney, privateer, financier, and prominent figure during the American Revolutionary War. He served alongside notable figures during the war such as Benjamin Franklin and Robert Morris. In June 1776 Dean discussed the vote for independence in Philadelphia. Dean would bankrupt himself for the American cause and donate his own ships to be used as privateering vessels against the British. He played significant roles in the early political and military efforts of Pennsylvania and Virginia, contributing to the fight for independence from Great Britain.

== Early life and family ==
Joseph Dean was born on August 10, 1738, in Ballymenagh, Antrim, Ireland, to William Dean (1719–1749), an Irish Presbyterian clergyman. His grandfather, William Dean (Deane), born in 1699, was the cousin of the notable Irish politician Joseph Deane, who served as the Chief Baron of the Irish Exchequer and was a member of the Privy Council of Ireland. Deane's father, Sir Matthew Deane, 1st Baronet of County Cork married Elizabeth Parker, the daughter of John Parker, Archbishop of Dublin.

Joseph's grandfather, William Dean, initially came to Philadelphia sometime in the 1720s or early 1730s to establish his family's presence in the New World during greater religious persecution of Scotch-Irish Presbyterians and in the aftermath of the Jacobite Rebellion. Once established, William would begin the undertakings of importing his family from Ireland. Joseph Dean would ultimately arrive in the early 1740s.

Reverend Dean was licensed on August 12, 1741, and served congregations in the American colonies in Pennsylvania, Delaware and Virginia. Rev. Dean was sent by the Presbyterian Church in Ireland (Ulster), immediately after becoming ordained, to Neshaminy, Bucks County, Pennsylvania, and the settlements on the Forks of Delaware. Which was still partially inhabited by the Lenape, or Delaware tribe, where he became acquainted with prominent Swedish and Dutch families of Mans Jones, Andrew Bird and John Rambo who were noted interpreters and former politicians.

In 1744, Rev. Dean traveled to Rockbridge, Augusta County, Virginia to serve as one of the temporary ministers at Timber Ridge Presbyterian Church, where remained for two years. In 1739, Benjamin Borden, received authorization for 100,000 acres to settle one hundred settlers in this region. The tract was heavily purchased from the Scotch-Irish the area became known as the "Irish Tract", who for a large extent identified as presbyterian which necessitated the Synod to bring ministers. On January 22, 1747, "Rev. William Dean, of Brandywine Manor and Chester County in Pennsylvania" purchased 265 acres from Benjamin Borden for £11, which bordered the land of John Gray and the McClung family. Dean's sister, Margaret and husband, John Bird, alongside a family friend and cousin of Anthony Morris (II), William Morris, moved to Virginia during 1745 from Pennsylvania. After Rev. Dean died in 1748, his father William Dean, took custody of the property and subsequently purchased additional property further west along Indian Camp Creek and the Jackson River – which he gifted to his son, John Dean.

Joseph Dean had several brothers, including Benjamin, John, and William. John later served as a Major in the Continental Army, while William rose to the rank of Colonel and distinguished himself in battles at Princeton, Trenton, and Germantown. Benjamin was a merchant.

Joseph Dean's first cousins in Virginia included: Mary (daughter of Margaret Dean and John Bird) who married Henry Morris (son of William Morris); and John Dean, who married Agnes McClanahan (sister of Col. Alexander McClanahan, Capt. Robert McClanahan, and Capt. John McClanahan). John McClanahan was married to Margaret Lewis, the niece of General Andrew Lewis and Col. Charles Lewis. Alexander McClanahan was married to Elizabeth Shelton, whose sister Sarah married Patrick Henry.

Joseph Dean is sometimes spelt Joseph Deane.

== Career and pre-revolution ==
Before the American Revolution, Joseph Dean established himself as a successful importing merchant in Philadelphia and attorney where he worked alongside Benjamin Franklin, Samuel C. Morris, Major Jacob Morris, Samuel Morris Sr., Robert Morris, and others. In 1788, when Franklin wrote his will, he mentioned William Dean. In Dean was a signer of the non-importation resolutions of 1765, which were early protests against British Stamp Act 1765. With the outbreak of the Revolutionary War, Dean became actively involved in the colonial resistance against British rule.

Dean was a co-owner alongside John Bayard of "John Bayard, John Dean, & Company" a merchant partnership turned privateering company that owned several privateer vessels, including the brigantine Hancock, the sloop Chance, and the sloop Congress. Dean also owned Joseph Dean, Philip Moore & Co.

In December 1775, Dean wrote to the Continental Congress requesting the court to allow Dean to send a vessel to Suriname, which John Hancock delivered to the congress.

== Revolutionary War ==
On April 11, 1776, the Continental Congress issued a commission authorizing John Adams, a mariner, to command the sloop Chance as a privateer which had been given a Letter of marque. The vessel, owned by Joseph Dean, Philip Moore & Co. of Philadelphia, was licensed to attack and seize British ships. The captured vessels were to be brought to colonial ports for legal condemnation as lawful prizes. The commission required adherence to the customs of civilized nations and was signed by John Hancock and John Adams, remaining in force until further notice from Congress.

On June 17, 1776, the Committee of Safety issued commissions to Wingate Newton and John Craig to command privateer vessels. Wingate Newton was granted command of the brigantine Hancock, armed with twelve carriage guns, and owned by John Bayard, John Dean, & Company. John Craig was given command of the sloop Congress, a privateer of seventy tons, with six cannons and thirty men, also owned by John Bayard, Joseph Dean, & Company. These commissions were granted in accordance with a resolve from Congress.

In August 1776, the sloop Congress seized the British brig Richmond, which amounted to a prize of over 20,000 sterling. In October 1776, the sloop Congress had instructions from the Commander in Chief of the Philadelphia armed boats (privateering vessels), Andrew Caldwell (1722–1788), to not pursue any British vessels from Bermuda or the Caribbean Islands. The sloop Congress became infamous to the British Navy for its Capture of HMS Savage in 1781.

During the Pennsylvania Provincial Conference in June 1776 Dean was one of 93 delegates voting to declare Pennsylvania's support for independence from England. Representing Philadelphia included, Timothy Matlack, Benjamin Franklin, Col. Joseph Dean, Samuel Cadwalader Morris, Capt. Jonathan Bayard Smith, Col. Thomas McKean, John Bayard, and Francis Gurney.

In December 1776, Dean was appointed to the Committee of Safety by the Pennsylvania Assembly.

On April 14, 1777, Dean was appointed onto the newly established Pennsylvania Board of War by Thomas Wharton, alongside David Rittenhouse, Samuel Morris, William Moore, and Owen Biddle. Robert Morris was selected as a delegate in the same announcement to the Continental Congress.

From 1776 - 1779, Dean's cousin's father-in-law, William Morris, also served as a privateer and captain in Virginia and was appointed by the Virginia Board of Trade to superintendent of the shipyard at Cumberland on the York River from 1779 - 1780 until it was shut-down, and later he was superintendent of the shipyard on the Pamunkey River until it was destroyed during the Siege of Yorktown. Morris oversaw the Commercial Department relating to import-export during the latter years of the war.

In 1780, he was one of the Auditors for the Pennsylvania Council on Safety. Also in 1780, Lt. Colonel Joseph Dean was commander of the 4th Battalion in the Philadelphia City Militia. On April 21, 1783, he was promoted Colonel with command over the 6th Battalion, Second Troop Philadelphia City Cavalry.

In January 1781, he was chosen by the Supreme Executive Council as Auditor of Public Accounts and Commissioner of Philadelphia County responsible for settling and adjusting the accounts of Pennsylvania troops serving the United States. He was a signer of several Pennsylvania paper currencies including the nine pence bill. Later that year, he was appointed Warden of the Port of Philadelphia. In 1790, he was selected as an auctioneer for the city.

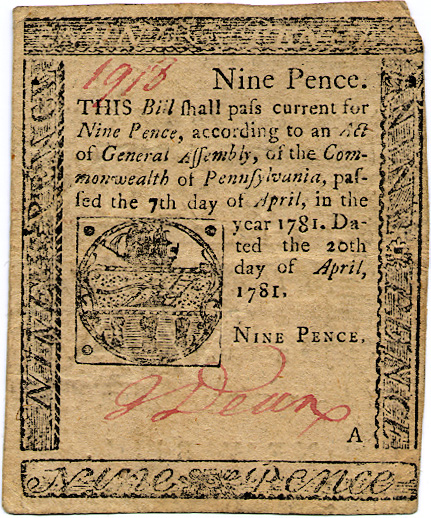
Nine Pence Bill signed by John Dean

During the Revolution, Dean was a significant financial supporter of the American cause. He loaned the general government $60,000, a substantial sum at the time, which he ultimately lost and resulted in bankruptcy. Dean's financial contributions were acknowledged by Robert Morris, who was a member of the Pennsylvania delegation in Congress.

After the Revolution, Joseph Dean invested heavily in real estate, purchasing properties that had been confiscated from loyalists and other attainted individuals, as well as receiving properties as payment for his loans to the government.

== Personal life and death ==
Joseph Dean was married twice. His first wife, Frances McCracken who died on March 1, 1776. He later married Hannah Boyd, who died on June 28, 1823. Both Joseph and Hannah Dean are buried in the Moravian burying ground at the corner of Franklin and Vine Streets in Philadelphia.

Joseph Dean died on September 9, 1793, in Philadelphia. His portrait, painted by the renowned artist Charles Willson Peale is in the possession of William F. Dean, Esq., a descendant.
