= Robert Smith (architect) =

Scottish-born American architect (1722-1777)

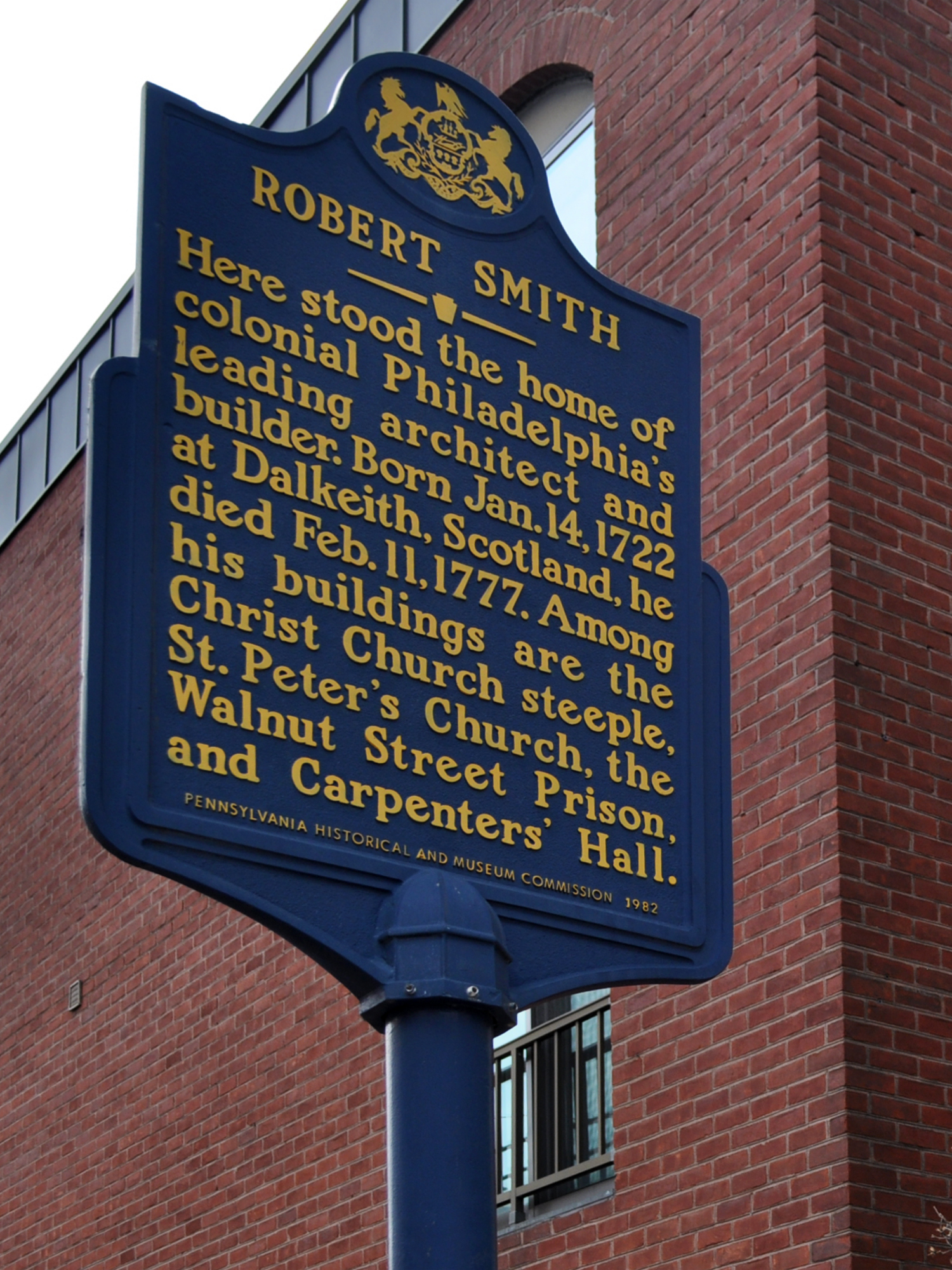
- Robert Smith's historical marker at 606 South 2nd Street in Philadelphia
- Born: January 14, 1722; Dalkeith, Scotland
- Died: February 11, 1777 (aged 55); Fort Billingsport, Gloucester County, New Jersey, United States
- Resting place: Philadelphia
- Occupation: Architect
- Known for: Carpenters' Hall; St. Peter's Episcopal Church; Nassau Hall

Robert Smith (January 14, 1722 - February 11, 1777) was a Scottish-born American architect who was based in Philadelphia and was the architect for some of the city's most prominent early building structures, including Carpenters' Hall, St. Peter's Episcopal Church, and the steeple on Christ Church. These structures constituted the greater part of Philadelphia's early skyline.

Other works by Smith include Nassau Hall at Princeton University and Williamsburg, Virginia's public hospital. He worked exclusively in the Georgian style.

== Early life ==
Smith was born in Dalkeith Parish, Midlothian, Scotland into a family that included many masons. As a young man, he apprenticed in the building trades. In late 1748, he emigrated from either Scotland or London to America.

== Career ==
Smith quickly became a member of the Carpenters' Company of Philadelphia, and is considered by many to be the foremost master-builder, or carpenter-architect, of the Colonial era. Smith has been called "America's most important 18th Century architect." He served as the master carpenter for Carpenters' Hall in Philadelphia, and oversaw the hall's design and construction from 1770–1774.

Working from published architectural sketchbooks or models of the past, a master-builder would adapt his designs to the building needs and materials of the colonial city. A famous client of Smith's was Benjamin Franklin. While living abroad, Franklin wrote a letter to his wife Deborah in which he complained that Smith was taking too long to complete their house.

Other notable projects on which Smith worked on in and around Philadelphia include the steeple of Christ Church, Walnut Street Prison, Nassau Hall at Princeton University and St. Peter's Church.

It is likely that Smith had a hand in shaping the Carpenter's Company's 1783 handbook for standards of workmanship and pricing. Entitled The Rules of Work of the Carpenter's Company of the City and County of Philadelphia, this pattern and specifications booklet was one of the first trade manuals printed in America. It was "loaned" to every member of the Company and kept a closely guarded trade secret.

Smith was active in cultural and political affairs. In addition to membership in the Carpenters' Company, Smith was also in the American Philosophical Society and the First Continental Congress. He was appointed by the city of Philadelphia as a Regulator of Party Walls and Partition Fences, a plum political position roughly akin to building inspector.

During the American Revolutionary War, Smith constructed chevaux-de-frise. These were boxes containing sharp metal-tipped wooden spikes which were weighted down with stones and sunk in the Delaware River to rip holes in the hulls of British warships.

== Death ==
Smith died during the Revolutionary War while working on the Continental Army barracks at Fort Billingsport in Gloucester County, New Jersey, which was part of the Continental Army's defenses on the Delaware River. He is buried in Philadelphia.
