= Pennsylvania Constitution of 1776 =

First constitution of Pennsylvania, US

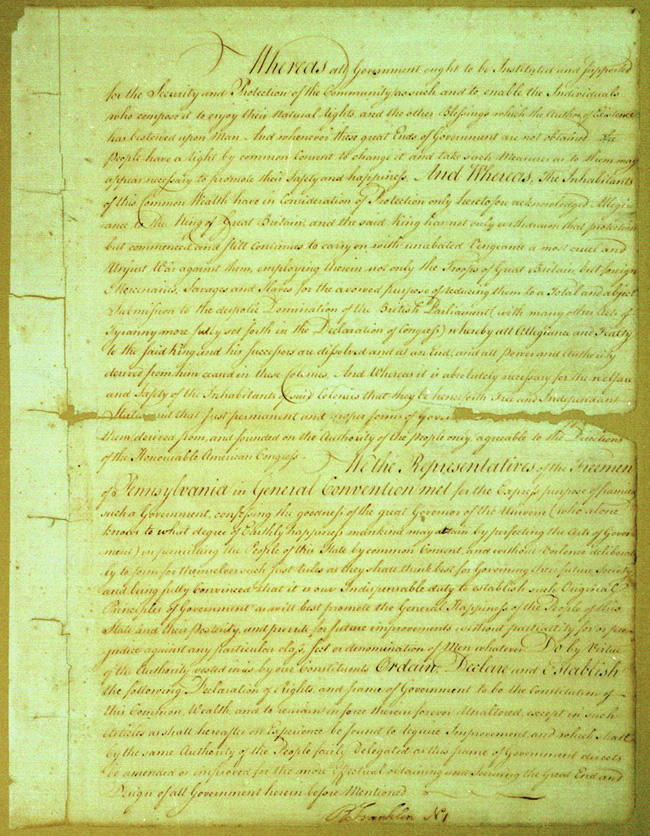
Pennsylvania Constitution of 1776

The Pennsylvania Constitution of 1776 (ratified September 28, 1776) was the state's first constitution following its declaration of independence and has been described as the most democratic in North America. It was drafted by Robert Whitehill, Timothy Matlack, Dr. Thomas Young, George Bryan, James Cannon, and Benjamin Franklin. Many of the men who took part in its creation were not members of Pennsylvania's government at the time, but rather an elected court composed of many non-landowners. Pennsylvania's innovative and highly democratic government structure, featuring a unicameral legislature and collective executive, may have influenced the later French Republic's formation under the French Constitution of 1793. The constitution also included a declaration of rights that coincided with the Virginia Declaration of Rights of 1776. It was replaced in 1790 by a new constitution.

== Background ==
Pennsylvania's new constitution was tied to ongoing political changes within the province in 1776. As the Revolution evolved, the views of some political leaders differed from those of the Provincial Assembly (and its supporters) and of the Deputy Governor, John Penn. Extralegal committees were established that would eventually displace and take over the government.

For example, in June 1774, after Governor Penn refused to convene the Assembly to consider the question of discussing some action to the British government's response to the Boston Tea Party, a public meeting held under the leadership of John Dickinson and Thomas Willing inspired 8,000 people in Philadelphia to call for the First Continental Congress and the establishment of a committee of correspondence to communicate with the other colonies. Although these measures were subsequently adopted by the Assembly, other public-action committees that had been supported by large public demonstrations (with attendees numbering in the thousands) outpaced Assembly action, for example establishing a military association for defense (though this action was later validated by the Assembly's establishment of the Committee of Safety). In May 1776, the Second Continental Congress called for dispensing with Royal Governors and Assemblies that did not act with the groups (parties) opposing the Crown. The Pennsylvania Provincial Conference in June 1776 resolved "that the present Assembly of the Colony is 'not competent to the exigencies of affairs' and that a Provincial Convention ought to be called for inaugurating a form of Colonial government, in compliance with the recommendation of Congress".

== Creation ==
Until this point, many influential leaders in Pennsylvania had not supported independence from the Crown, but had favored reconciliation. The Continental Congress, however, inspired the more radical elements in Pennsylvania to overmaster these more conservative leaders. Shortly afterwards, in June 1776, these committees called a state convention, which met on July 15, 1776. The decisions made at that convention would, when ratified, cause the previous government to be completely superseded; it established a Council of Safety to rule in the interim, and it drew up the commonwealth (state) constitution, which was adopted on September 28, 1776. The change of government, was, however, opposed by many of the commonwealth's citizens - John Dickinson, James Wilson, Robert Morris, and Frederick Muhlenberg, among others.

The main goal of this new constitution was not only to limit but to completely prevent the creation of an aristocracy, as many radicals, "employed a brand of rhetoric laden with appeals to patriotism and bromides against the British Empire". Specifically, it was based on Thomas Paine's Common Sense. It played a major role in the rewriting of this constitution. According to many sources, Paine "played a conspicuous part." This fear can be seen in the amount of emphasis placed on terms like "liberty" and "the people's government". In the new constitution, the lower class would wield a much larger amount of power than they had ever had access to. Additionally, the unicameral legislature had been added for the same purpose. The framers believed that adding an upper house would lead to the creation of an aristocracy down the line.

The constitutional convention met in Philadelphia and elected Benjamin Franklin, president, Colonel George Ross, vice-president, John Morris, secretary, and Jacob Garrigues, assistant-secretary. From its inception, the convention arrogated to itself the interim political power of the state. The constitution was completed on September 28, at which time it was read in convention for the last time, signed by the president and members, and transmitted to the Committee of Safety, with directions to deliver it to the general assembly of the state at their first meeting, immediately after they should have chosen their speaker. The first meeting of the Pennsylvania General Assembly took place on November 28, 1776. Thomas Wharton Jr., who had been the President of the Committee of Safety, was chosen as President of the Supreme Executive Council in June 1777 and became, in effect, the first Governor of the Commonwealth.

== Innovations ==
It contained several innovations that were quite radical for that era. Many of these changes came directly from other sources or complaints regarding the old ways of government. These innovations all expanded the democracy of the constitution. The most noticeable change in the new constitution is that all men who had paid taxes were permitted to vote, an innovation because it was somewhat less restrictive than the requirement that voters own property. Voting rights now included African American men who paid this tax.

Additionally, a unicameral legislature, with members elected for one term, was put in place by the constitution. The goal of this change was to prevent the elite from having sole control over the government. There was no house for the aristocracy, but rather just one that was controlled by the large number of newly enfranchised people who could replace the legislature every year. This was highly contested by the colonists given it, "presupposed a social condition that did not exist," as not all citizens of the state were equal in wealth and wisdom. Additionally, the government had a twelve-member Supreme Executive Council to administer the government, made up of a small council and a president elected by the Assembly and Council together. Thomas Wharton Jr. was chosen in 1777 to be the first President of the Supreme Executive Council. This group was not granted a veto, nor were they given much other power at all. The bulk of government affairs and the power were held by the unicameral legislature. This was done to prevent an aristocratic government from forming, where one man was able to limit the Assembly that was elected by the people.

Council of Censors (elected every seven years) to conduct an evaluation of the activities of the state government. The members were elected every seven years but could be removed at any time should the people agree. This gave the people significant power when it came to deciding on fair and responsible judges. It could censure actions by the government, order impeachments and recommend to the legislature the repeal of laws that appeared to violate the constitution. The Council of Censors was the only body with the authority to call a convention to amend the constitution.

Another major difference in this constitution that made it stand apart from all other constitutions is the level of transparency that was expected and required from the government. The Assembly, or the legislative branch, kept all of its meetings public. The people were allowed to watch and observe what was going on at any point in time. Additionally, the provision that all approved legislation would take effect only at the next session of the Assembly, so the people of the state could assess the utility of the proposed law. This was the first instance in the colonies where the government was expected to share this information publicly. This level of transparency that existed in the government would prevent the Assembly from growing its own power or keeping secrets from its constituents.

A few additional aspects of the constitution were added that separate this constitution from others of its time:

- Included in the oaths required to swear in is a statement that denounces George III and the North ministry.
- A judiciary appointed by the legislature for seven-year terms, removable at any time.
- The inclusion of a public school system that is open to all white, male children, regardless of landowning status.
- Prohibition of imprisonment as a punishment for being in debt.
- The constitution also established Pennsylvania's official title, the "Commonwealth of Pennsylvania." Three other states (Kentucky, Massachusetts, and Virginia) are presently self-designated as "commonwealths."

These innovations caused much of the strife that led to the creation of a new constitution in 1790, as "They wanted the government of Pennsylvania to be cleansed of the vestiges of monarchical and proprietary rule and become representative, but argued that further deviations from colonial tradition were unnecessary."

== Impacts ==
The lasting effect of the Pennsylvania 1776 Constitution can be seen in many constitutions around the world, but especially in that of Vermont. Additionally, the constitution served as a template for Vermont's 1777 constitution, which gave birth to the state (or what historians refer to as the Vermont Republic, because claim over the land was disputed by both New York and New Hampshire, until it was formally admitted into the Union in 1791). While looking at the other constitutions of the time, "the representatives took up the question of a state constitution, and after concluding that the recent New York Constitution of 1777 was a "horrible example," they proposed a constitution modeled closely after Pennsylvania's." Vermont took many details from the Pennsylvania Constitution, including a unicameral legislature and nearly universal voting rights for white men. The Pennsylvania Constitution places the Bill of Rights before the rest of the Constitution, which creates the framework for the government. Virginia will also follow this format in their own Constitution. The rights that are included in the Pennsylvania Bill of Rights are very similar to those in the United States Constitution. Freedom of speech, freedom of religion, and the right to a trial by jury are also present in the national Bill of Rights created in 1787. However, the majority of the other rights listed in the Pennsylvania Constitution involved the people defining and creating their government under democracy. This was defined as an unalienable right of the people and was listed over and over again in the Bill of Rights.

== See also ==
- James Wilson (Founding Father)
- Frame of Government of Pennsylvania
- Uniform Firearms Act
