= Philadelphia Election Riot =

1742 political/religious riot in Pennsylvania, USA

Coordinates: 39.9500°N 75.1437°W

The Philadelphia Election Riot in 1742 was a riot that occurred due to political disagreements among the constituents of the increasingly diverse population in the city. Politics in Pennsylvania, including Philadelphia, had long been dominated by the Quakers but, with their political dominance increasingly threatened by the predominantly Anglican Proprietary Party, tensions grew in the city. The Quakers and Anglicans were predominantly led by Isaac Norris II and William Allen, both of whom were well respected and held significant political power. In an attempt to swing the vote, the Proprietary Party "hired armed sailors" to disrupt the Quakers who, in their own attempt, were bringing "unnaturalized Germans from the country to vote." On voting day, October 1, 1742, violence broke out between the two sides.

== Background ==
The Quakers had dominated the political landscape of Philadelphia for years and the growing German population seemed to be a means by which they could continue this domination. Realizing this, John Kinsey and, particularly, Isaac Norris II led the Quakers in attempting to convince the Germans to vote along with their interests. Attempts to persuade the increasing German population seemed to be paying off, as voter turnout tripled between 1739 and 1740. The German population found the pacifism of the Quakers attractive, as the former saw it as protection from the draft and high taxes. However, John Isaac also drew the Germans to their cause by making property available to them, in addition to doing regular business with the Germans.

Although the Quakers had won the favor of the German citizens, they, like the Anglicans, resented the Germans who had begun migrating to the colony after 1715. By the 1750s, the German population of Pennsylvania had increased greatly, with 40% of the colony's constituents being German. Throughout the same decade, the German vote was effectively split and didn't play much of a role in elections; however, that began to change in the 1760s, when the Propriety Party began to recruit the equally disliked Dutch to their side, and the Quakers saw it necessary to redouble their efforts to gain the support of the Germans. The Germans were much more fond of farming than politics, thus, rather than striving to gain political power themselves, they fancied their position as swing voters, as it ensured that they would also benefit from those who needed their support.

Failing to win the favor of the German vote, William Allen and his fellow Anglicans sought to amend the election process by reviving a 1739 election law that provided party-specific election inspectors. In part, this was because of the distrust of the Quakers which derived from their prior electoral day transgressions. The Quakers, from 1739 to 1741, had taken advantage of the voting process. The elected official would collect the filled out ballot from the citizen and run it upstairs to the counting area, by blocking the stairs and only allowing favorable ballots through. Allen hoped that the revival of the election law would allow for a fair vote. However, the two sides could not agree on the means by which to guarantee a fair election and, as such, distrust grew between the two sides.

With election day coming fast, both sides had damning rumors swirling around their respective camps. The Quakers believed that the Anglicans were going to attack the polls with a large number of vigilantes, which they were, as a few dozen sailors had been hired. On the other hand, the Anglicans believed that the Quakers were upping their effort to obstruct the voting officials by bringing even more Germans, which they were, and other citizens who were seen as unqualified to vote.

== Election day ==
On October 1, 1742, the "Bloody Election," as scholars refer to it, led to an outbreak of violence between the Quakers and Proprietary Party. The voting was to take place in the "Market Place" in the city of Philadelphia and Philadelphia County elections at 9:00 am, and city officials had asked that no weapons be carried due to a fear of violence. At the polls, the two sides debated once more over who should be the inspectors of the election. While the debate was occurring, about fifty to eighty sailors carrying blunt objects, mostly clubs, gathered among the crowd. Just as Isaac Norris II was chosen as an inspector, the mob of sailors violently assaulted the crowd.

Even though the sailors were destroying property and injuring many, when Allen was asked to call the sailors off, he claimed they had as much right to be there as the Dutch and Germans. Eventually, German and Dutch citizens picked up makeshift weapons of their own to beat back the assailant sailors, who retreated to their ships.

== Aftermath ==
William Allen was widely blamed for the riots and, thus, the riot politically benefitted the Quakers, who did better in the coming elections, as the Anglican's Proprietary Party lost the election in a landslide. Reports show that many voters had altered their original ballots, crossing out their original vote for the Proprietary Party and instead voting for the Quaker Party.

Fifty-four sailors and party leaders were jailed. Allen, the Proprietary leader, in an effort to clear his name, sued one of the Quaker leaders for claiming that Allen had planned the assault. The matter was turned over to the Quaker-led Assembly (over Allen's objections) for investigation. The Assembly cast the investigation as the result of public outcry, when it is likely none truly existed. After questioning forty-nine witnesses, most of whom were Quakers and included none of the sailors, the Assembly ruled that Allen, his business partner, the mayor, and two others (all Anglicans) should be investigated for being negligent in their duties and subverting the Pennsylvania Charter. Allen was ruled the instigator of the riot. After months of investigation, they turned the matter over to the Quaker-controlled Supreme Court.

Governor George Thomas, an Anglican, stated that the city's Mayor's Court had jurisdiction, meaning the Recorder, Aldermen, and Mayor Clement Plumsted (all Anglicans) would hear the case. The Assembly protested that these parties could not hear the case because they were among the accused. Eventually, a Quaker-devised compromise was reached. Charges were withdrawn, as was the original slander suit, and steps were taken to define election procedures and prevent future riots.

The Philadelphia Election Riot, along with other riots taking place during the same time period in cities like New York and Boston, are important in examining the American Revolution. Riots taking place in these cities represented a radical change in the way that citizens interacted with their government. "This transformation involved quiescent lower-class elements; the organization of political clubs, caucuses, and tickets; the employment of political literature and inflammatory political rhetoric as never before; the involvement of the clergy and churches in politics; and the organization of mobs and violence for political purposes."

== See also ==
- List of riots in Philadelphia
- Lombard Street riot
- Philadelphia nativist riots
