= William Allen (loyalist) =

American judge (1704–1780)

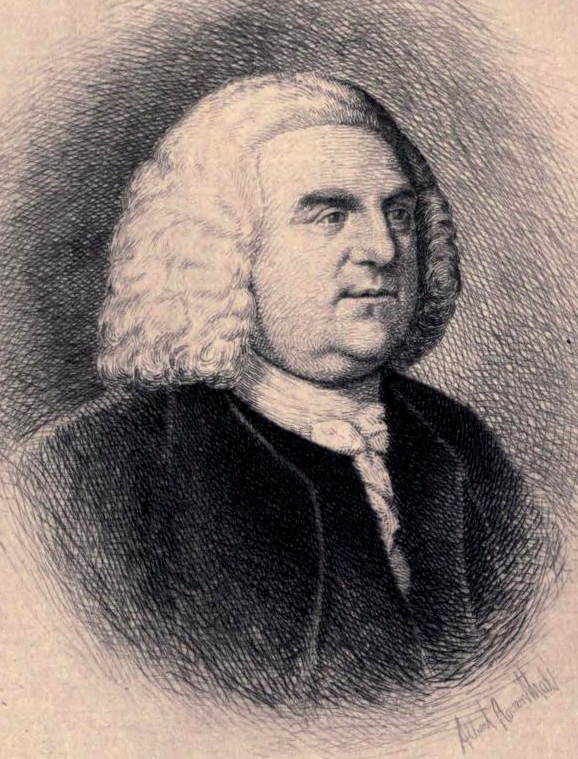
- Born: August 5, 1704; Philadelphia, Province of Pennsylvania, British America
- Died: September 6, 1780 (aged 76); Mount Airy, Philadelphia, Pennsylvania, U.S.
- Occupations: Merchant, Jurist
- Spouse: Margaret Hamilton
- Children: 6, including Andrew

William Allen (August 5, 1704 – September 6, 1780) was a wealthy merchant, attorney and chief justice of the Province of Pennsylvania, and mayor of Philadelphia during the colonial era. At the time of the American Revolution, Allen was one of the wealthiest and most powerful men in Philadelphia. A Loyalist, Allen agreed that the colonies should seek to redress their grievances with British Parliament through constitutional means, and he disapproved of the movement toward independence.

He built a manor and country estate, known as Mount Airy, in 1750 outside Philadelphia; the neighborhood became known by his estate's name and is now part of the city. In 1762, he founded what became Allentown, Pennsylvania, and had a hunting lodge there.

== Early life and education ==
Allen was born in Philadelphia on August 5, 1704, the son of William Allen Sr., a successful Philadelphia merchant of Scots-Irish descent who had immigrated from Dungannon, County Tyrone, Ireland along with his brother, John, and father. The elder Allen had risen to prominence through close ties to William Penn, the proprietor of Pennsylvania.

As a youth, Allen spent much of his time in England for his education and refinement. In 1720, he was admitted to the Middle Temple in London to study law, and at the same time became a pensioner at Clare College at the University of Cambridge.

== Career ==
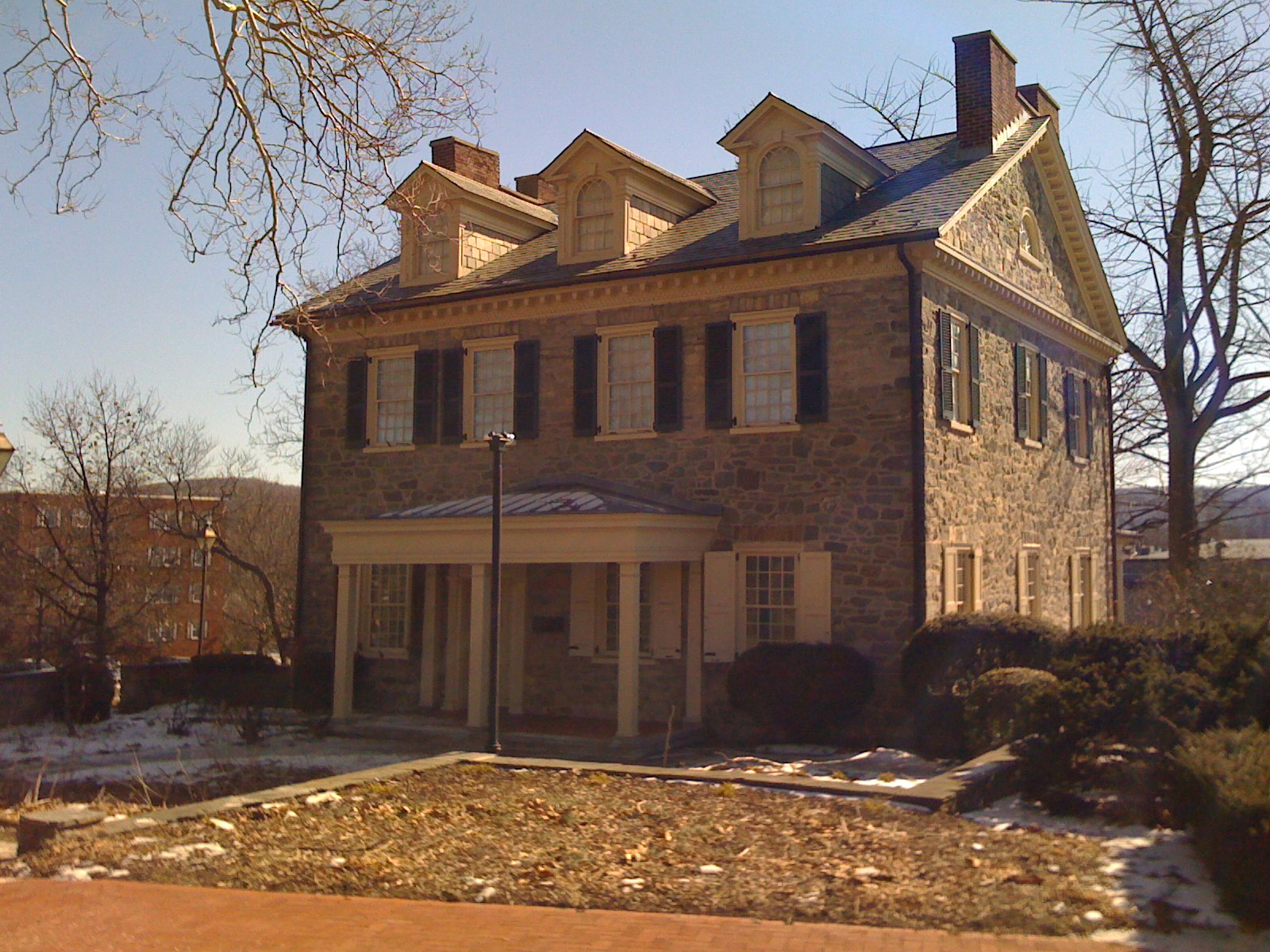
Trout Hall, built in 1770 by William Allen's son James Allen, is one of the oldest houses in Allentown, Pennsylvania; from 1867 to 1905, it served as the home of Muhlenberg College.

Following his father's death in 1725, Allen returned to Philadelphia to manage the family's business interests.

=== Land acquisition for State House ===
In spring 1729, Allen was named alongside lawyer Andrew Hamilton, his future father-in-law, as a trustee for the purchase and building fund to develop the State House in Philadelphia, then the capital of the province. Both men were authorized to buy the land for the project. By October 1730, Allen and Hamilton began to purchase lots on Chestnut Street at their own expense, the property on which the Pennsylvania State House, later known as Independence Hall, was built. By the will of Andrew Hamilton, dated July 31–August 1, 1741, Allen inherited all the land of the yard for the state house and its surrounding public grounds. They were to be managed by him and his brother-in-law James Hamilton. On September 13, 1761, Allen and Hamilton conveyed Lot no. 1 and the other pieces of land acquired to Isaac Norris II and the other trustees of the province. This completed the yard, which became the site of the State House and its surrounding public space.

=== Political career ===
Allen's political career began in 1727 within Philadelphia's city government, and by 1730, he was elected to the Pennsylvania House. There he supported William Penn's sons and Andrew Hamilton, who had become speaker in 1729. Together, Hamilton and Allen led the Proprietary Party, which controlled the House for much of the 1730s. Allen also communicated with Proprietor Thomas Penn regarding colonial politics. In 1735, Allen was appointed mayor of Philadelphia. The following year, in 1736, he celebrated the opening of the nearly complete State House, later renamed Independence Hall, by hosting a feast for all residents and guests of the city; it was described at the time as "the most grand, the most elegant entertainment that has been made in these parts of America."

In 1739, when both Allen and Hamilton retired from the House, the opposition Quaker Party, unhappy with the Proprietors' paper money policies and the governor's support for war with Spain, regained control for the next seventeen years. Allen lost his bid for a seat in 1740, and in 1742, the Quakers accused him of inciting sailors to riot during the Philadelphia election to intimidate their voters. The riot was unsuccessful, and Allen never ran for a legislative seat in Philadelphia again.

Allen was appointed as Chief Justice of the Supreme Court of colonial Pennsylvania, serving from 1751 to 1774. He resigned due to increasing tensions resulting from his Loyalist beliefs and health concerns. He was succeeded by Benjamin Chew.

In 1768, he was elected as a member of the American Philosophical Society.

=== Freemason ===
Allen was a Freemason, a member of St. John's Lodge No. 1, "Moderns," Philadelphia, known as the Tun Tavern Lodge. Appointed Provincial Grand Master of Pennsylvania, "Moderns" on June 24, 1731, he is the second Grand Master of the Provincial Grand Lodge of Pennsylvania and also the youngest at 26 years old. Allen served two terms as Grand Master, the first from 1731 to 1732 and the second from 1747 to 1761.

=== Benefactor ===
In 1760, encouraged by William Smith, Allen sponsored the young painter Benjamin West's trip to Italy. He established a £100 line of credit for West and, in a letter of introduction in 1760, called him "a young ingenious Painter of this City, who is desirous to improve himself in that Science, by visiting Florence and Rome." A year later, Allen and his brother-in-law, the Governor James Hamilton, provided more money for West. He developed as one of the century's most important painters and, from 1792 until his death in 1820, served as president of Britain's Royal Academy. West referred to Allen as "the principal of my patrons."

== Founding of Allentown, Pennsylvania ==
In 1762, Allen laid out the plan of present-day Allentown, Pennsylvania, which he then called Northampton Town. The property was part of a 5,000-acre (20 km^{2}) plot which Allen had purchased in 1735 from his business partner Joseph Turner. He bought it from Thomas Penn, son of William Penn. Allen hoped that Northampton Town would displace Easton as the seat of Northampton County and also become a commercial center, due to its location along the Lehigh River and its proximity to Philadelphia.

Allen gave the property to his son James in 1767. Three years later, in 1770, James built a summer residence, Trout Hall, in the new town, near the site of his father's former hunting lodge.

On March 18, 1811, the town was formally incorporated as a borough. On March 6, 1812, Lehigh County was formed from the western half of Northampton County, and Northampton Town was selected as the county seat. The town was officially renamed "Allentown" in 1838 after years of popular usage. It was formally incorporated as a city on March 12, 1867. Today, Allentown is the third largest city in Pennsylvania. In 1959, William Allen High School, the largest public high school in Allentown, was named in his honor.

== Mount Airy, Pennsylvania ==
Allen built a mansion and country estate, called Mount Airy, on Germantown Avenue in 1750. The area eventually took the estate's name, Mount Airy, as its own. The estate stood on what is today the campus of the Lutheran Theological Seminary at Philadelphia.

In 1774, Allen, a Loyalist, moved to England, where he published The American Crisis: A Letter, Addressed by Permission of the Earl Gower, Lord President of the Council, on the present alarming Disturbances in the Colonies, which proposed a plan for restoring the American colonies to rule under British Crown. He remained in England throughout most of the American Revolution, and did not return to Philadelphia until 1779, after the British Army had evacuated.

== Personal life ==
On February 16, 1734, Allen married Margaret Hamilton, daughter of Andrew Hamilton, defense lawyer in the 1735 Zenger case and sister of James Hamilton. William and Margaret had six children: John, Andrew, James, William, Anne, and Margaret. Like their father, Allen's sons were Loyalists in the American Revolution.

Anne Allen married John Penn, a proprietor of the province with a one-fourth interest, who served as the last colonial governor of Pennsylvania. She lived with him for a time in exile in New Jersey during the British occupation of Philadelphia, but they returned to the city in 1788 and lived the remainder of their lives near there.

== Death ==
On September 6, 1780, Allen died at home in the Mount Airy section of Philadelphia, at age 76, a year prior the end of the Revolutionary War in 1781.

Advertisements from The Pennsylvania Gazette in 1732 show that Allen and his business partner Joseph Turner participated in the slave trade. Allen manumitted slaves he owned in his will.

== Honors ==
- William Allen High School in Allentown, Pennsylvania, the third-largest public high school in Pennsylvania, is named in his honor.
- Allens Lane, a street in Mount Airy, Pennsylvania is named in his honor.
- Richard Allen Lane station, a SEPTA regional rail station, was named in his honor until 2022 when it was renamed in honor of Richard Allen.

Legal offices
| Preceded by Jeremiah Langhorne | Chief Justice, Supreme Court of Pennsylvania; 1750–1774 | Succeeded by Benjamin Chew |
Political offices
| Preceded by Thomas Lawrence | Mayor of Philadelphia; 1735–1736 | Succeeded by Clement Plumsted |
