= Mary Norris Dickinson =

American landowner

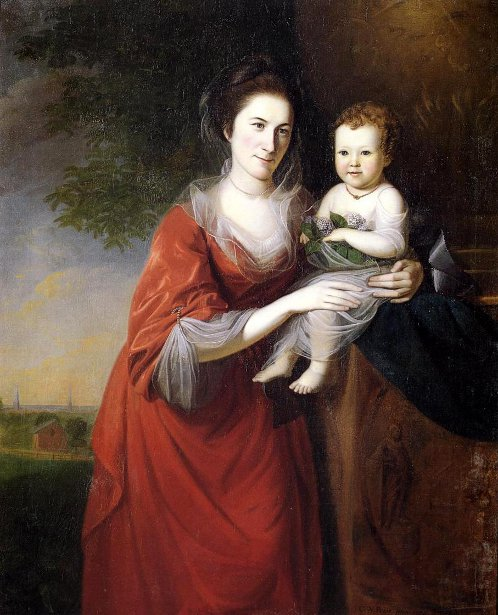
- Portrait of Dickinson and daughter Sallie by Charles Willson Peale
- Born: July 17, 1740; Philadelphia, Province of Pennsylvania, British America
- Died: July 23, 1803 (aged 63); Wilmington, Delaware, U.S.
- Resting place: Friends Burial Ground in Wilmington, Delaware
- Other name: Polly Norris Dickinson
- Occupations: Land and estate owner and manager
- Spouse: John Dickinson (m. 1770)
- Children: 5

Mary Norris Dickinson (July 17, 1740, in Philadelphia, Pennsylvania – July 23, 1803, in Wilmington, Delaware) was an early American land and estate owner and manager. She is known for her ownership of one of the largest libraries in the American colonies, her participation in political thought of the time, and her presence in or near events of the Constitutional Convention, including her marriage to Framer John Dickinson, one of the early drafters of the Constitution and one of its signers on behalf of the colony of Delaware. They bequeathed much of their combined library to the first college founded in the new United States. The college was originally named "John and Mary's College", by Benjamin Rush, for Norris Dickinson and her husband and is now called Dickinson College.

== Early life and economic and political position ==
Mary "Polly" Norris was born on July 17, 1740, in Philadelphia, Pennsylvania, the daughter of Isaac and Sarah (née Logan) Norris. The Norris family were members of the Quaker Meeting, also known as the Religious Society of Friends. Her extended family included members of the Logan and Norris families, who were either loyal to the British Crown but advocates for nonviolent protest of British policies; or advocates for American independence. One of her Logan cousins was the Quaker poet Hannah Griffitts (aka "Fidelia"), one of the advocates for nonviolent protest but not independence, who had lived with Norris at her family's home for a time as a child.

Norris was well-educated and owned one of the largest libraries in the colonies at the time, holding approximately 1,500 books, as well as personal and real property, including the estate of Fair Hill in the Philadelphia area. After her parents had died, when she was age 26, Norris ran the estate, either by herself or with her sister Sally, for a number of years. Measured by the time of her marriage at age 30, she also held personal property of between £50,000 and £80,000 (about $7.8 million to $12.4 million, adjusted for inflation to 2013).

Norris was a participant in correspondence with Milcah Martha Moore, Hannah Griffitts, Samuel Fothergill, Patrick Henry, Susanna Wright, Benjamin Franklin, and other politically and economically engaged men and women of the colonial era in Pennsylvania that was documented in Moore's book of that time.

== Marriage ==
On July 19, 1770, at the age of 30, Norris married John Dickinson. While both were raised as Quakers, they married in a civil ceremony, rather than in the Quaker Meeting, because of objections they had to certain of its tenets, including prohibitions on defending oneself if attacked. This caused controversy in her extended family. Although they had five children, only their daughters Sarah "Sally" Norris Dickinson and Maria Mary Dickinson survived to adulthood.

John Dickinson was one of the Founding Fathers of the United States. Although he declined to sign the Declaration of Independence, because he and those he represented in Pennsylvania believed it would lead to violence (they preferred civil disobedience and verbal protest) and the colonies were not ready to self-govern, he was named as the chair of the committee that drafted the Articles of Confederation, which he and others drafted around a concept of person rather than man as was used in the Declaration of Independence. He later enlisted in the Pennsylvania Militia as a private and later was named a brigadier general in the Continental Army, while Mary Norris continued to manage their property. Along with James Madison, he was also a principal writer of the first draft of the Constitution of the United States, converting it from the Articles of Confederation. Dickinson was then a delegate from Delaware and signed the Constitution as such.

The couple shared common social, political and economic ideals and often discussed these matters. In John Adams' frustration with Dickinson's refusal to sign the "[divine] rights of man" Declaration of Independence, Adams, who believed women should be subordinate, is said to have noted after having dinner at the Dickinsons, "if I should have had such a wife . . . ., I should have shot myself." While direct decision-making in political, economic and educational matters were not openly afforded women in fora such as the Constitutional Convention, in the Quaker Meeting women held position equal to men in keeping with the Quaker view that "in souls there is no sex" and in the colonial era in the Delaware Valley region, heavily populated with Quakers and others holding similar views, women held more influence than in other parts of the colonies, including voting rights (although these often included property ownership requirements, and the Coverture laws could sometimes prevent married women from meeting such requirements). Women also often worked in the marketplace and were quite inventive, as the truth and the legend of Betsy Ross indicates, although for married women, the Coverture laws again sometimes meant their recognition and compensation in the marketplace varied.

In the culture of the Delaware Valley, men took roles as nurturing fathers. Late in his life, John Dickinson wrote much about the need for education of youth in civic matters and Quaker thought for the health and stability of the new nation.

== Fair Hill estate ==
Dickinson and her husband lived at Fair Hill while they were in Philadelphia despite his having previously built another house in Philadelphia. During the Revolutionary War, British maps identified the estate as belonging to "the patriot Dickinson," and it was subsequently burnt during the Battle of Germantown by British forces. The library survived due in part to its thick walls and its separation from the main house.

The ownership of Fair Hill after her marriage has been a confused issue in historical records, with a member of the Logan family saying in a diary written years later that the property was transferred to a paternal male cousin, Joseph Parker Norris, at the time of the Norris-Dickinson marriage while other records show that after the marriage, she and her husband used their combined wealth to modernize Fair Hill and to live there for many years at her request despite his having previously built another house in Philadelphia.

The norm in Quaker families of this time was the equal division of the estate among children of both sexes, rather than division of property exclusively between the sons (or only to eldest sons). In some families, the daughters would receive only personal property and not real property, however, in Norris' family, only she and her sister survived to adulthood. (Quaker families also sometimes used inheritance as an instrument of communal control over younger people, however, specifically in regard to the problem they saw of marrying outside the Quaker Meeting.) The Logan family diary record, written by a descendant of her maternal aunt, suggests the aunt and others sought transfer of some of Norris' real property, including Fair Hill, to Joseph Parker Norris at the time of the marriage or later, although there is no record that this transfer actually happened until possibly in 1790.

== John and Mary's College ==
In 1784, Norris and Dickinson bequeathed much of their combined library and some land in Carlisle, Pennsylvania, to the first university founded in the new United States, originally named John and Mary's College in their honor by its founder Benjamin Rush and later renamed Dickinson College.

== Death ==
Mary Norris Dickinson died in Wilmington, Delaware, on July 23, 1803.

== Children ==
- Sarah "Sally" Dickinson (December 10, 1771 – 1832)
- Mary Dickinson (May 7, 1774 – May 5, 1775)
- John Dickinson (August 9-September 2, 1778)
- stillborn son (July 5, 1779)
- Maria Dickinson (November 6, 1783 – 1854), married Albanus Charles Logan and had the following children:
  - Sarah Elizabeth Logan (1812-1859)
  - Gustavus George Logan (1815-1876)
  - John Dickinson Logan (1817-1881)
