= Susanna Wright =

American poet

- Born: August 4, 1697; Warrington, Lancashire, England
- Died: December 1, 1784 (aged 87); Columbia, Pennsylvania, United States
- Occupations: Frontierswoman and writer

Susanna Wright (August 4, 1697 – December 1, 1784) was an 18th-century American poet, pundit, botanist, business owner, and legal scholar who was influential in the political economy of the Province of Pennsylvania, one of the Thirteen Colonies that ultimately engaged in the American Revolution and founded the United States.

== Early life and education ==
Wright was born in Warrington in Lancashire, England, on August 4, 1697, to the Quaker businessman John Wright and Patience Gibson. She was the eldest of two brothers, John Jr. and James (who was not born until 1714), and two younger sisters, Elizabeth and Patience.

In 1714, her entire family left for the Province of Pennsylvania in what was then British America. Her youngest brother, James was born in 1714 in Chester County, Pennsylvania. Her mother died around 1721. As the eldest child, Wright largely raised her brothers and sisters, especially James, who was 16 years younger than her. Around 1724, her father began exploring the Conejohela Valley, and he, Susanna, John and James, along with two other Quaker families settled in an area known as "Shawanna town on Susquehanna" in 1726. Her two sisters married and remained in Chester County. Wright purchased 100 acres of land along the Susquehanna River in present-day Columbia, Pennsylvania. Her father, John Wright Sr., purchased the neighboring 150 acres, where he built a small house that was torn down in the 1800s. In 1730, John Wright Sr. obtained a patent to operate what became known as Wright's Ferry on the lower Susquehanna River. The ferry was built on Susanna's property and run by her two brothers. She had a house built in 1738, which is still standing today.

Wright was well educated and, in addition to her native English, knew Latin, French, and Italian, and displayed wide-ranging scientific, agricultural, and literary interests typical of 18th century Enlightenment culture.

== Career ==
Wright never married and lived in the lower Susquehanna River area for the rest of her life. She managed her father's household after her mother's death in 1721 and, after her father died in 1749, helped to take care of her brother James's family. In the 1750s, Wright moved into a mansion named Bellmont (since demolished), having been bequeathed a life interest in it by one of her father's partners in the ferry venture, Samuel Blunston.

Among other pursuits, she raised hops, hemp, flax, indigo, and silkworms, establishing the first silk industry in Pennsylvania and receiving an award from the Philadelphia Silk Society in 1771. Silk extracted from her several thousand silkworms was dyed locally and then sent to England to be woven into the heavier grades of silk cloth suitable for mantuas, and the lighter grades needed for stockings. There is folklore that in the 1770s, Benjamin Franklin took a piece of Wright's cloth to Queen Charlotte of Britain as a gift. Wright wrote an essay on silkworm culture that was published posthumously. She also studied the medicinal uses of herbs and formulated medicines for her neighbors.

Known for her good judgment and integrity, she became a prothonotary or principal clerk of the court, in which capacity she drew up legal documents such as land deeds, indentures, and wills for her less-literate neighbors. She was also called on informally to settle local disputes, especially those involving colonists and Native Americans.

Through letter writing, Wright cultivated connections among the literary, political, and scientific elites of the eastern seaboard. Her correspondents included the politicians Isaac Norris and James Logan, and many writers. Wright's Ferry was well positioned as a stopover point between Philadelphia and the western frontier, and consequently Wright met a number of notable travelers over the years, including Benjamin Franklin and physician Benjamin Rush.

Franklin sought out her help in outfitting the Braddock Expedition of 1753 and in dealing with the Paxton Boys troubles of 1763–1764, and he remained a regular correspondent of hers, sending her such presents as a thermometer from London. When Wright took part in local election campaigns in 1758, one local politician grumbled about her acting "so unbecoming and unfemale a part."

In 1784, just a few months before Wright died, Benjamin Rush wrote in his journal about "the famous Suzey Wright, a lady who has been celebrated above half a century for her wit, good sense and valuable improvements of mind." Wright died on December 1, 1784, at the age of 88, after showing some signs of dementia.

=== Poetry and punditry ===
Wright was part of an informal but influential group of Mid-Atlantic women and men writers; female members included the poet and pundit Hannah Griffitts, who considered her a mentor, and Milcah Martha Moore, the writers Elizabeth Graeme Fergusson and Anna Young Smith, and the historian and diarist Deborah Norris Logan. She wrote poetry throughout her life, and many of her known poems were produced in later years. Some 30 of her poems are included in Moore's commonplace book, a compilation of poetry and prose that was published in 1997 under the title Milcah Martha Moore's Book. One of the poems is written to Mary Norris Dickinson. Wright is one of the three dominant female contributors to Moore's commonplace book, along with Griffitts and Fergusson. Contrary to the then-usual practice, Wright did not write under a pseudonym; in Moore's book, her poems are attributed either to 'S. Wright' or to 'S.W.' It is uncertain how many poems Wright produced in total, but it is likely that many are now lost. An early 19th-century reminiscence of Wright by the much younger Deborah Norris Logan states that Wright "wrote not for fame, [and] never kept copies" of her work.

Wright's poems range from occasional verses to mystical poetry and meditations on such enduring themes as justice, time, death, immortality, friendship, family, and marriage. In one poem, for example, she calls memory "A Bubble on the Water's Shining Face." Some of her poems could be quite trenchant.

A long poem written for one of her close friends and fellow unmarried women, "To Eliza Norris—at Fairhill," debunks the "divine law" bing claimed by some during the Framing Era to justify women's inequality, including in marriage. Eliza Norris raised her niece, Mary Norris. Mary Norris in 1770 married Framer of the Constitution John Dickinson in a civil ceremony. A passage reads:

"But womankind call reason to their aid,
And question when or where that law was made,
That law divine (a plausible pretence)
Oft urg'd with none, & oft with little sense."

== See also ==
- Midlands Enlightenment
