= John Dickinson =

Founding Father of the United States (1732–1808)

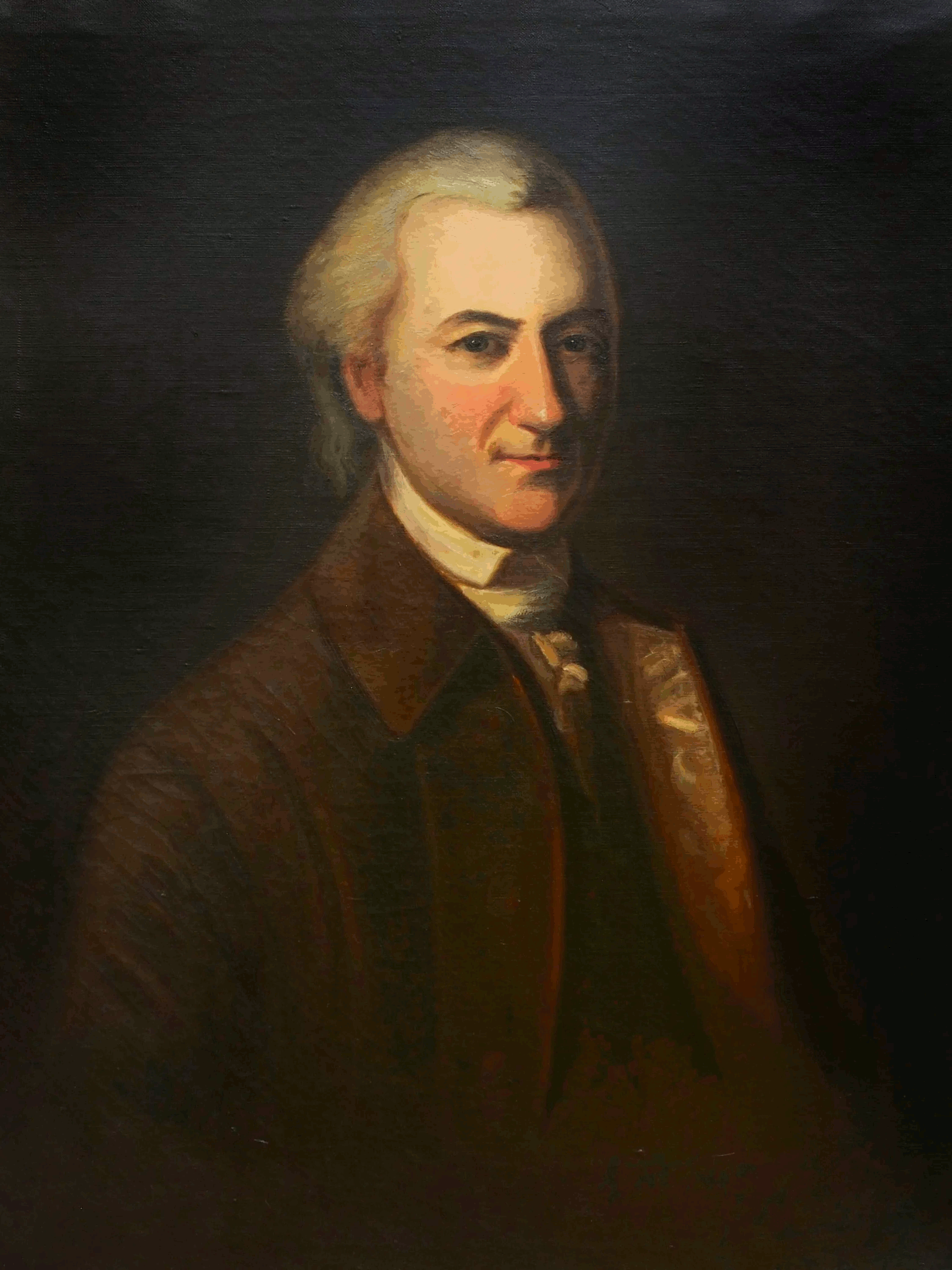

5th President of Pennsylvania
- In office November 7, 1782 – October 18, 1785
- Vice President: James Ewing; James Irvine; Charles Biddle
- Preceded by: William Moore
- Succeeded by: Benjamin Franklin

5th President of Delaware
- In office November 13, 1781 – January 12, 1783
- Preceded by: Caesar Rodney
- Succeeded by: John Cook

Continental Congressman from Delaware
- In office January 18, 1779 – February 10, 1781

Continental Congressman from Pennsylvania
- In office August 2, 1774 – November 7, 1776

Personal details
- Born: November 2, 1732 (Note: Various sources indicate a birth date of November 8, 12 or 13, but his biographer Flower, as of 1983, offers November 2 without dispute.) Talbot County, Province of Maryland, British America
- Died: February 14, 1808 (aged 75) Wilmington, Delaware, U.S.
- Resting place: Friends Burial Ground in Wilmington, Delaware
- Party: Democratic-Republican
- Occupation: Planter (until 1777), Abolitionist (after 1777), Lawyer

John Dickinson (November 13, [O.S. November 2, 1732 – February 14, 1808) was an American Founding Father, attorney and politician from Philadelphia, Pennsylvania, and Wilmington, Delaware. Dickinson was known as the "Penman of the Revolution" for his 12 Letters from a Farmer in Pennsylvania, published individually in 1767 and 1768, and he also wrote "The Liberty Song" in 1768.

As a member of the First Continental Congress, where he signed the Continental Association, Dickinson drafted most of the 1774 Petition to the King, and then, as a member of the Second Continental Congress, wrote the Olive Branch Petition in 1775. Both of these attempts to negotiate with King George III of Great Britain failed. Dickinson also reworked Thomas Jefferson's language to write the final draft of the 1775 Declaration of the Causes and Necessity of Taking Up Arms.

As a delegate to Congress, Dickinson served on the committee that wrote the Model Treaty, a template for seeking alliances with foreign countries, but he opposed independence from Great Britain. He either abstained or was absent from the vote on the Declaration of Independence and refused to sign the document after its passage. Nevertheless, Dickinson wrote the first draft of the 1776–1777 Articles of Confederation and Perpetual Union and served as a militia officer during the Revolution. He was later elected president of the 1786 Annapolis Convention, which called for the Constitutional Convention of 1787, and as a delegate from Delaware, he signed the United States Constitution.

One of the wealthiest men in the British American colonies, Dickinson served as president of Delaware (1781–1783) and president of Pennsylvania (1782–1785). Upon Dickinson's death, President Thomas Jefferson referred to Dickinson as "(a)mong the first of the advocates for the rights of his country when assailed by Great Britain" and called him "one of the great worthies of the revolution."

Together with his wife Mary Norris Dickinson, he is the namesake of Dickinson College, Penn State Dickinson Law, and the Dickinson Complex at the University of Delaware. John Dickinson High School in Wilmington, Delaware, was dedicated in his honor in 1959.

== Early life and education ==
Dickinson's coat of arms

Dickinson was born at Crosiadore Plantation, his family's tobacco plantation near the village of present-day Trappe, Maryland, in the Province of Maryland in British America. He was the great-grandson of Walter Dickinson who came from England as an indentured servant to the Colony of Virginia in 1654 and, having joined the Society of Friends, came with several co-religionists to Talbot County on the eastern shore of the Chesapeake Bay in 1659. There, with 400 acres (1.6 km^{2}) on the banks of the Choptank River, Walter began a plantation, Croisadore, meaning "cross of gold." Walter also bought 800 acres (3.2 km^{2}) on St. Jones Neck in what became Kent County, Delaware.

Croisadore passed through Walter's son, William, to his grandson, Samuel, the father of John Dickinson. Each generation increased the landholdings so that Samuel inherited 2,500 acres (1,000 ha) on five farms in three Maryland counties; over his lifetime, he increased that to 9,000 acres (3,600 ha). He also bought the Kent County property from his cousin and expanded it to about 3,000 acres (1,200 ha), stretching along the St. Jones River from Dover to the Delaware Bay. There he began another plantation and called it Poplar Hall. These plantations were large, profitable agricultural enterprises worked by slave labor, until 1777 when John Dickinson freed the enslaved of Poplar Hall.

Samuel Dickinson married Judith Troth (1689–1729) on April 11, 1710. They had nine children: William, Walter, Samuel, Elizabeth, Henry, Elizabeth "Betsy", Rebecca, and Rachel. The three eldest sons died of smallpox while in London seeking their education. Widowed with two young children, Henry and Betsy, Samuel married Mary Cadwalader in 1731. She was the daughter of Martha Jones, the granddaughter of Dr. Thomas Wynne, and the prominent Quaker John Cadwalader, who was the grandfather of General John Cadwalader of Philadelphia. Their sons, John, Thomas, and Philemon were born in the next few years.

For three generations, the Dickinson family had been members of the Third Haven Friends Meeting in Talbot County, and the Cadwaladers were members of the Meeting in Philadelphia. But in 1739, John Dickinson's half-sister, Betsy, was married in an Anglican church to Charles Goldsborough in what the Meeting called a "disorderly marriage." The couple would be the grandparents of Maryland governor Charles Goldsborough.

Leaving Croisadore to elder son Henry Dickinson, Samuel moved to Poplar Hall, where he had already taken a leading role in the community as judge of the Court of Common Pleas of Kent County. The move also placed Mary nearer her Philadelphia relations. Poplar Hall was situated on an artificially straightened section of the St. Jones River. There was plenty of activity delivering necessities and shipping the agricultural products produced. Much of this product was wheat that, along with other wheat from the region, was milled into a "superfine" flour. Most people at this plantation were servants and slaves of the Dickinsons.

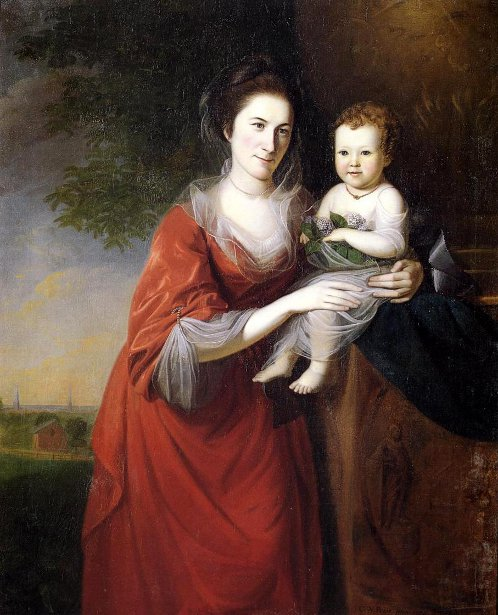
A 1773 portrait of Mary Norris Dickinson, Dickinson's wife, and Sallie Dickinson, their daughter, by Charles Willson Peale

Dickinson was educated at home by his parents and by recent immigrants employed for that purpose. Among them was the Presbyterian minister Francis Alison, who later established New London Academy in Chester County, Pennsylvania. Most important was his tutor, William Killen, who became a lifelong friend and who later became Delaware's first chief justice and chancellor. While Dickinson was precocious and energetic and adored Poplar Hall, his family's heart was set on Philadelphia.

At age 18, Dickinson began studying law under John Moland in Philadelphia. While there, he became friends with fellow students George Read, Samuel Wharton, and others. In 1753, he went to London to study for three years at the Middle Temple. He spent those years studying the works of Edward Coke and Francis Bacon at the Inns of Court, following in the footsteps of his lifelong friend, Pennsylvania Attorney General Benjamin Chew. (Note: Page 28 details Dickinson's 1764 address to the Pennsylvania Assembly, where he advocated against making the colony directly ruled by the crown to preserve constitutional freedoms.)

== Personal life ==
On July 19, 1770, Dickinson married Mary Norris, known as Polly, a prominent and well educated 30-year-old woman in Philadelphia with a substantial holding of real estate and personal property, including a 1,500-volume library, one of the largest in the colonies at the time, who had been operating her family's estate, Fair Hill, for several years by herself with some support from her sister. She was the daughter of wealthy Philadelphia Quaker and Speaker of the Pennsylvania General Assembly Isaac Norris and Sarah Logan, the daughter of James Logan. She was also cousin to the Quaker poet Hannah Griffitts. Dickinson and Norris had five children, but only two survived to adulthood: Sarah Norris "Sally" Dickinson and Maria Mary Dickinson. Dickinson never formally joined the Quaker Meeting because, as he explained, he believed in the "lawfulness of defensive war". He and Norris were married in a civil ceremony.

In Philadelphia, they lived at Fair Hill near the present-day Germantown neighborhood, which they modernized through their combined wealth. Meanwhile, Dickinson built an elegant mansion on Chestnut Street, but never lived there as it was confiscated and turned into a hospital during his 1776–1777 absence in Delaware. It then became the residence of the French ambassador and then the residence of Dickinson's brother, Philemon Dickinson. On November 22, 1777, Fair Hill was one of a number of houses burned by the British. While in Philadelphia as state president, Dickinson lived at the confiscated mansion of Joseph Galloway at Sixth and Market Streets, which is now the State Presidential Mansion.

Dickinson lived at Poplar Hall for extended periods from 1776 to 1777 and from 1781 to 1782. In August 1781, Poplar Hall was sacked by Loyalists and was badly burned in 1804. It is now owned by the state of Delaware and is open to the public. In 1785, following his service as president of Pennsylvania, Dickinson lived in Wilmington, Delaware, and built a mansion at the northwest corner of 8th and Market Streets in Center City Philadelphia.

== Career ==
In 1767 and 1768, in protest to the Townshend Acts, Dickinson published Letters from a Farmer in Pennsylvania, which were first published in the Pennsylvania Chronicle. Dickinson's letters were reprinted by numerous other newspapers and emerged as among the most influential American political documents prior to the American Revolution. Dickinson argued that the British Parliament had the right to regulate commerce but lacked the right to levy duties for revenue. Dickinson further warned that if the colonies acquiesced to the Townshend Acts, Parliament would lay further taxes on the colonies in the future. After publishing these letters, he was elected in 1768 to the American Philosophical Society as a member.

=== Continental Congress ===
Dickinson was one of the delegates from the Province of Pennsylvania to the First Continental Congress in 1774 and the Second Continental Congress in 1775 and 1776. In support of the cause, he continued to contribute declarations in the name of the Congress. Dickinson wrote the Olive Branch Petition as the Second Continental Congress's last attempt for peace with King George III, who did not read the petition. But through it all, agreeing with George Read and many others in Philadelphia and the lower counties, Dickinson's objective at first was reconciliation, not independence and revolution. Dickinson prepared the first draft of the Articles of Confederation in 1776, after others had ratified the Declaration of Independence despite his concerns that the Declaration would escalate the Revolutionary War, which began in 1775 at the Battle of Lexington and Concord. At the time, he chaired the committee charged with drafting the Articles of Confederation, while serving in the Continental Congress as a delegate from the province of Pennsylvania.

When the Second Continental Congress began the debate on the Declaration of Independence on July 1, 1776, Dickinson reiterated his opposition to declaring independence at that time. Dickinson believed that Congress should complete the Articles of Confederation and secure a foreign alliance before issuing a declaration. Dickinson also objected to violence as a means for resolving the Thirteen Colonies' dispute with Britain. He abstained or absented himself from the votes on July 2 that declared independence and absented himself again from voting on the wording of the formal declaration on July 4. Dickinson understood the implications of his refusal to vote, saying, "My conduct this day, I expect will give the finishing blow to my once too great and, my integrity considered, now too diminished popularity." Dickinson refused to sign the declaration, and since a proposal had been brought forth and carried that stated "for our mutual security and protection", no man could remain in the Continental Congress without signing it, so Dickinson voluntarily departed and joined the Pennsylvania patriot militia. John Adams, a fierce advocate for independence and Dickinson's adversary on the floor of Congress, remarked, "Mr. Dickinson's alacrity and spirit certainly become his character and sets a fine example."

In the Pennsylvania militia, known as the Associators, Dickinson was given the rank of brigadier general and led 10,000 soldiers to Elizabeth, New Jersey, to protect the area against a British attack from Staten Island. But because of his unpopular opinion of abstaining from supporting independence, two junior officers were promoted above him.

=== Return to Poplar Hall ===
Dickinson resigned his commission in December 1776 and went to stay at Poplar Hall in Kent County. While there, Dickinson learned that his home on Chestnut Street in Philadelphia had been confiscated and converted into a hospital. He stayed at Poplar Hall for more than two years. The Delaware General Assembly tried to appoint him as their delegate to the Second Continental Congress in 1777, but he refused. In August 1777, he served as a private with the Kent County militia at Middletown, Delaware, under General Caesar Rodney to help delay General William Howe's march to Philadelphia during the Philadelphia campaign. In October 1777, Dickinson's friend Thomas McKean appointed him as a brigadier general in the Delaware Militia, but he again declined the appointment. Shortly afterward, Dickinson learned of the burning of Fair Hill during the battle of Germantown.

In 1777, Dickinson, by then Delaware's wealthiest farmer and largest slaveholder, decided to free his slaves. While the number of slaves in Kent County was not as large as the Southern Colonies and Dickinson had only 37 slaves, this action has been described as requiring considerable personal courage on Dickinson's part. The strongly abolitionist Quaker influences around them likely influenced his decision, and his action was facilitated by his farm's shift from farming tobacco to less labor-intensive crops, including wheat and barley. Dickinson was the only Founding Father to free his slaves prior to 1786 when others also began doing so, except for Benjamin Franklin, who had freed his slaves by 1770.

=== President of Delaware ===
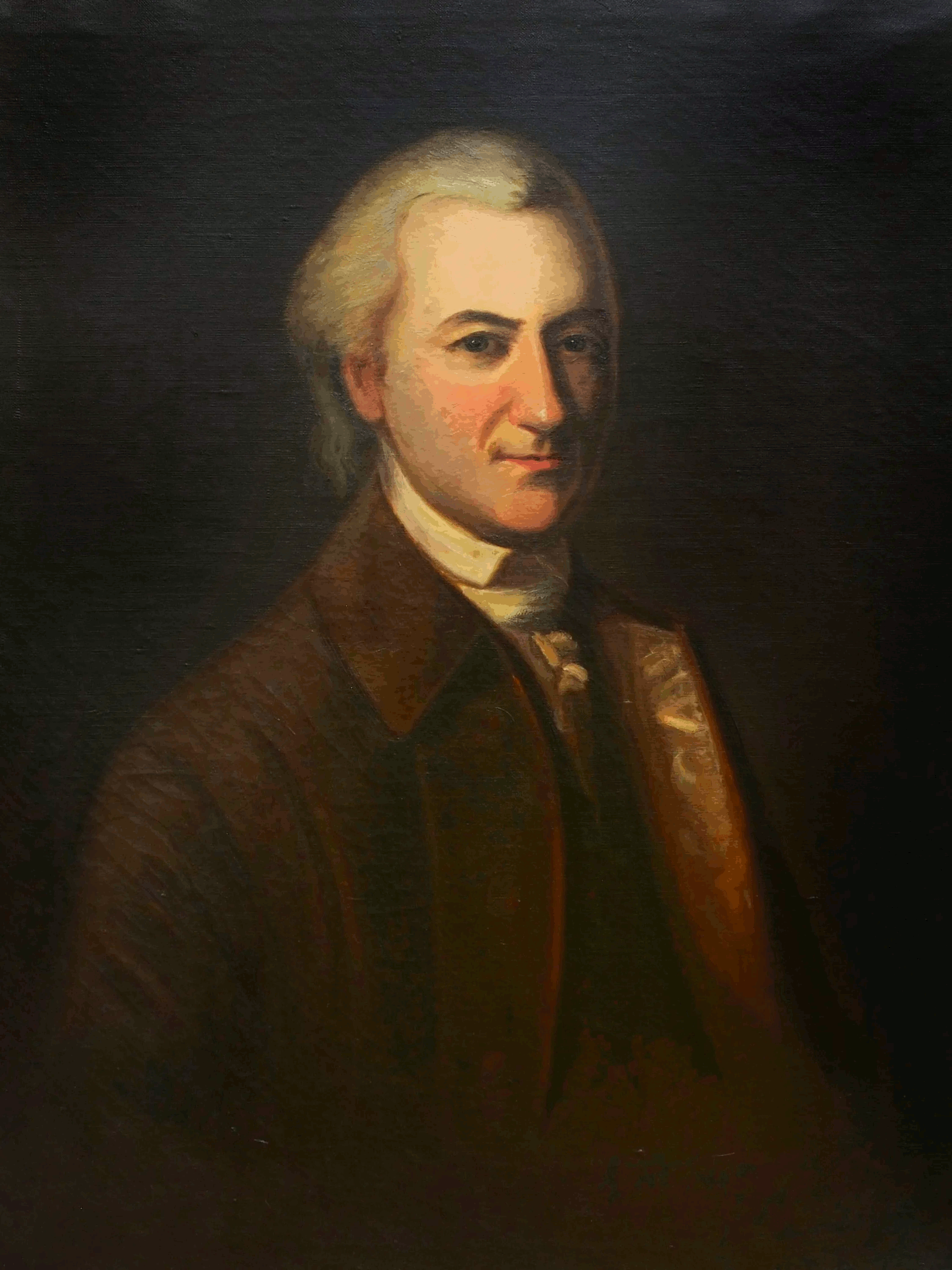
Dickinson as President of Delaware

On January 18, 1779, Dickinson was appointed to be a delegate for Delaware to the Second Continental Congress, which was convening at what today is Independence Hall in Philadelphia. During this term, he signed the Articles of Confederation, which he authored while serving in the First Continental Congress as a delegate from Province of Pennsylvania. In August 1781, while still a delegate in Philadelphia, he learned that Poplar Hall had been severely damaged by a Loyalist raid. Dickinson returned to the property to investigate the damage and remained there for several months.

In October 1781, while at Poplar Hall, Dickinson was elected to represent Kent County in the State Senate. Shortly after, the Delaware General Assembly elected him president of Delaware. The General Assembly's vote was nearly unanimous; the only dissenting vote was cast by Dickinson himself. Dickinson took office on November 13, 1781, and served until November 7, 1782. Beginning his term with a "Proclamation against Vice and Immorality," he sought to bring an end to what he perceived to be the disorder of the American Revolution. It was a popular position and enhanced his reputation both in Delaware and Pennsylvania. Dickinson then successfully challenged the Delaware General Assembly to address lagging militia enlistments and to properly fund the state's assessment to the Confederation government. Recognizing the delicate negotiations then underway to end the American Revolution, Dickinson secured the Assembly's continued endorsement of the French alliance, even as no agreement on a separate peace treaty with Great Britain.

On October 10, 1782, Dickinson was elected to the Supreme Executive Council of Pennsylvania. On November 7, 1782, a joint ballot by the Council and the Pennsylvania General Assembly elected him as president of the council and thereby president of Pennsylvania. But he did not actually resign as president of Delaware. Even though Pennsylvania and Delaware shared the same governor until very recently, attitudes were changing, and many in Delaware were upset at being seemingly cast aside so readily, particularly after Philadelphia newspapers began criticizing Delaware for permitting its officeholders to be non-residents. Dickinson's constitutional successor, John Cook, was considered too weak in his support of the Revolution. On January 12, 1783, Cook called for a new election to choose a replacement, leading Dickinson to formally resign.

Delaware General Assembly (sessions while President)
Year	Assembly	Senate Majority	Speaker	House Majority	Speaker
1781/82	6th	non-partisan	Thomas Collins	non-partisan	Simon Kollock
1782/83	7th	non-partisan	Thomas Collins	non-partisan	Nicholas Van Dyke

=== President of Pennsylvania ===
When the American Revolution began, Dickinson fairly represented centrist views in Pennsylvania politics as opinions on independence were still divided. The Pennsylvania General Assembly at the time was dominated by the Loyalists and moderates who, like Dickinson, did little to support the burgeoning Revolution or independence, except to protest. The Radicals took matters into their own hands, using irregular means to draft the Pennsylvania Constitution of 1776, which by law excluded from the franchise anyone who would not swear loyalty to the document or the Christian Holy Trinity. In this way, all Loyalists, moderate Whigs, and Quakers were kept out of government. This peremptory action seemed appropriate to many during the crises of 1777 and 1778, but less so in the later years of the Revolution, and the moderate Whigs gradually became the majority.

Dickinson's election to the Supreme Executive Council was the beginning of a counterrevolution against the Constitutionalists. He was elected president of Pennsylvania on November 7, 1782, garnering 41 votes to James Potter's 32. As president, he presided over the state's intentionally weak executive authority and served as its chief officer, but always required the agreement of a majority to act. He was re-elected twice and served the constitutional maximum of three years; his election on November 6, 1783, was unanimous. On November 6, 1784, he defeated John Neville, who also lost the election for vice president the same day. Working with small majorities in the General Assembly in his first two years and with the Constitutionalists in the majority in his last year, all issues were contentious. At first, he endured withering attacks from his opponents over his alleged failure to fully support the new government, both in large and small ways. He responded ably and survived the attacks. He managed to settle the old boundary dispute with Virginia in southwestern Pennsylvania, but was never able to satisfactorily disentangle disputed titles in the Wyoming Valley, resulting from Connecticut's prior claims to those lands. An exhausted Dickinson left office on October 18, 1785. On that day, a special election was held in which Benjamin Franklin was unanimously elected to serve the ten days left in Dickinson's term.

Perhaps the most significant decision of his term was his patient, peaceful management of the Pennsylvania Mutiny of 1783. This was a violent protest of Pennsylvania veterans who marched on the Continental Congress demanding their pay before being discharged from the Continental Army. Somewhat sympathetic to their case, Dickinson refused Congress's request to take full military action against them, prompting Congress to vote to remove itself to Princeton, New Jersey. And when the new Congress agreed to return in 1790, it was to be for only 10 years, until a permanent capital was found elsewhere.

Pennsylvania General Assembly (sessions while President)
Year	Assembly	Majority	Speaker
1782/83	7th	Republican	Frederick A. C. Muhlenberg
1783/84	8th	Republican	George Gray
1784/85	9th	Constitutional	John Bubenheim Bayard

=== United States Constitution ===
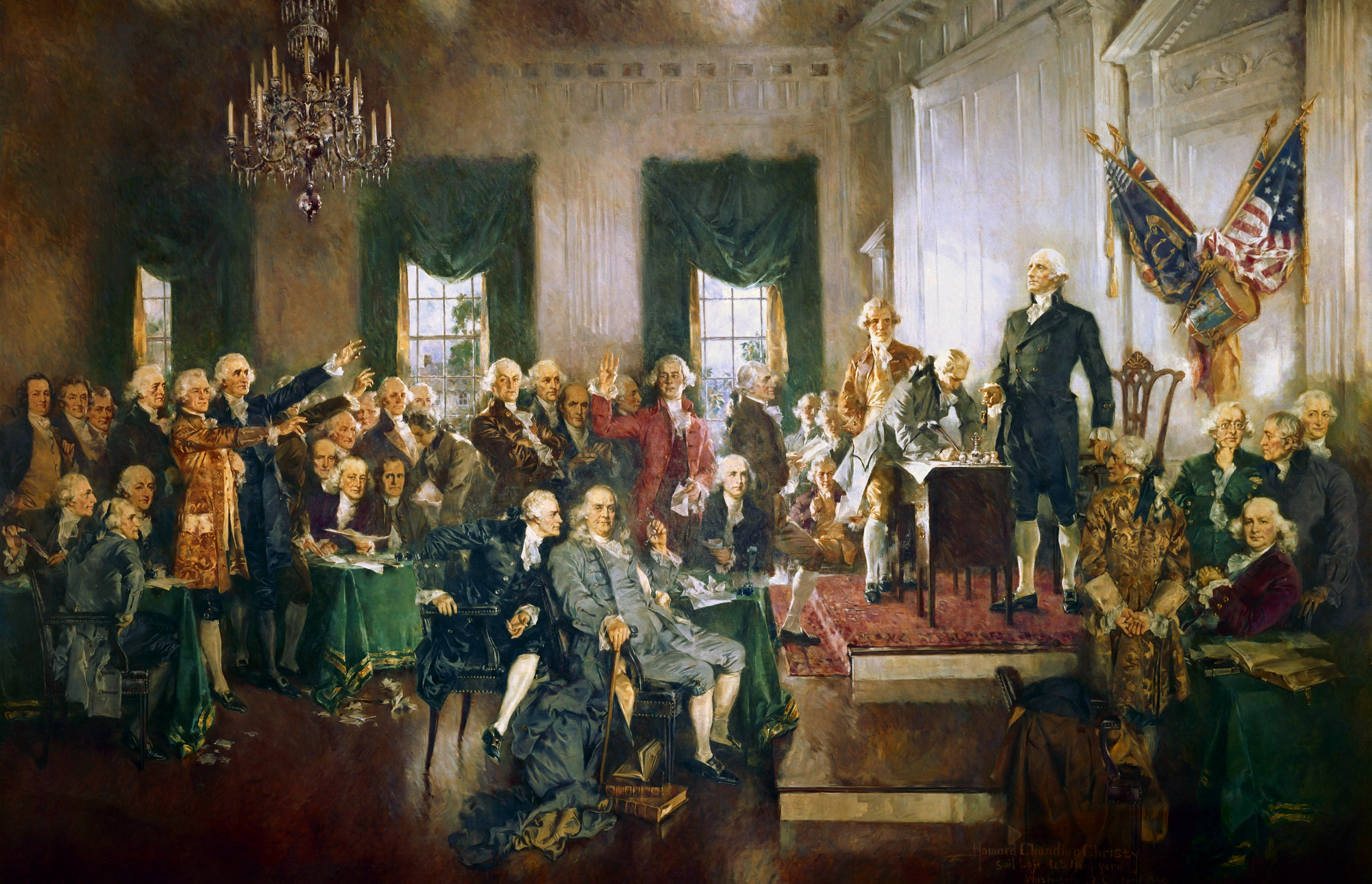
Scene at the Signing of the Constitution of the United States a 1940 portrait by Howard Chandler Christy depicting the ratification of the Constitution at Independence Hall on June 21, 1788

After his service in Pennsylvania, Dickinson returned to Wilmington, Delaware, where he was quickly appointed to represent Delaware at the Annapolis Convention, where he served as its president. In 1787, Delaware sent him as one of its delegates to the Constitutional Convention of 1787, along with Gunning Bedford Jr., Richard Bassett, George Read, and Jacob Broom. There, he supported the effort to create a strong central government but only after the Great Compromise assured that each state, regardless of size, would have an equal vote in the future United States Senate. As he had done with the Articles, he carefully drafted it with the term "Person" rather than "Man" as was used in the Declaration of Independence. He prepared initial drafts of the First Amendment. Following the Convention, he promoted the resulting Constitution in a series of nine essays, written under the pen name Fabius.

Dickinson himself did not sign the constitution as he left early due to chronic illness but instead a colleague, George Read signed his name.

In 1791, Delaware convened a convention to revise its Constitution, which had been hastily drafted in 1776. Dickinson was elected president of this convention, and although he resigned the chair after most of the work was complete, he remained highly influential in shaping the final document. Major changes included the establishment of a separate Chancery Court and the expansion of the franchise to include all taxpayers. Dickinson remained neutral in an attempt to include a prohibition of slavery in the document, believing the General Assembly was the proper place to decide that issue. The new Constitution was approved on June 12, 1792. Dickinson had freed his slaves conditionally in 1776 and fully by 1787.

Dickinson returned to the State Senate for the 1793 session but served just one year before resigning because of his declining health. He was the Anti-Administration nominee in the 1795 United States Senate special election in Delaware, losing by one vote to congressman Henry Latimer.

In his final years, he worked to further the abolition movement and donated a considerable amount of his wealth to the "relief of the unhappy." In 1801, Dickinson published two volumes of his collected works on politics.

== Death and legacy ==
Designations

Pennsylvania Historical Marker
- Official name: John Dickinson (1732–1808)
- Type: Roadside
- Criteria: American Revolution, Government & Politics 18th Century, Military
- Designated: September 23, 2001
- Location: Montgomery Ave. at Haverford Ave., Narberth
- Marker Text: Statesman, author. In influential writings, 1765–74, he argued against British policies. Later, as a member of the Continental Congress, 1774–76, he favored conciliation and opposed the Declaration of Independence; nonetheless, he served the patriot cause as a colonel in the 1st Philadelphia Battalion. President, Pa. Supreme Executive Council, 1782–85. Delegate, U.S. Constitutional Convention, 1787; a strong supporter of the Constitution. Deeded land to Merion Meeting, 1801–04.

Dickinson died at Wilmington, Delaware, and was buried in Friends Burial Ground in Wilmington. Shortly before his death, he unconditionally freed all of his slaves. While he had been economically reliant on them, he also wanted slavery to end. By freeing all of his slaves upon his death, he thought this would contribute to the United States having a future without slavery. Like many of the founders, he believed slavery would die "a natural death."

In an original letter discovered in November 2009 from Thomas Jefferson to Joseph Bringhurst, caretaker of Dickinson in his later years, then-President Jefferson responds to news of Dickinson's death ten days earlier: "A more estimable man, or truer patriot, could not have left us. Among the first of the advocates for the rights of his country when assailed by Great Britain, he continued to the last the orthodox advocate of the true principles of our new government and his name will be consecrated in history as one of the great worthies of the revolution."

He shares with Thomas McKean the distinction of serving as chief executive of both Delaware and Pennsylvania after the Declaration of Independence. Dickinson College and Dickinson School of Law (now part of the Pennsylvania State University), separate institutions each operating a campus located in Carlisle, Pennsylvania, on land inherited and managed by his wife, Mary Norris, were named for them. Dickinson College was originally named "John and Mary's College" but was renamed to avoid an implication of royalty by confusion with "William and Mary." And along with his Letters from a Farmer in Pennsylvania, Dickinson also authored The Liberty Song.

Dickinson Street in Philadelphia is named in his honor, as is Dickinson Street in Madison, Wisconsin. The John Dickinson School in the Wilmington area of Delaware was also named for him. The former John Dickinson Residence Hall Complex at the University of Delaware also bore his name.

An original stage play Except, Mr. Dickinson was presented at the 15th Street Meeting House in an off-Broadway setting. The show was written by August Nigro.

== Social and religious views ==
Dickinson was a self-taught scholar of history and spent most of his time in historical research. As an intellectual, he thought that men should think for themselves, and his deepening studies led him to refuse to sign the Declaration of Independence, which was subsequently unanimously adopted by the remaining delegates to the Second Continental Congress. Dickinson did not consider it wise to plunge into war; rather, he thought it best to pursue diplomacy to attain political ends and used the insights he gained from his historical studies to justify his caution. Given that Dickinson was raised in an aristocratic family, his cautious and thoughtful temperament was influenced by his Quaker affiliation and upbringing. As Dickinson learned more about historical movements, however, he came to embrace the Revolutionary cause. Dickinson was very careful and refined in thought. Dickinson wrote in 1767, "We cannot act with too much caution in our disputes. Anger produces anger; and differences, that might be accommodated by kind and respectful behavior, may, by imprudence, be enlarged to an incurable rage." He did not behave rashly, insisting that prudence was the key to great politics. Dickinson used his study of history to further his education to become a lawyer. This pursuit would expose him to more historical schooling. His education and religion allowed him to make important political decisions based on reason and sound judgment. John Powell states, "...these forces of Puritanism had a vigorous expression. It is precisely because Dickinson epitomized the philosophic tenets of the Puritan Revolution that his theories were of enormous importance in the formation of the Constitution, and have considerable meaning for us today." His studies of history and religious viewpoints had a profound impact on his political thought and actions.

Dickinson incorporated his learning and religious beliefs to counteract what he considered the mischief flowing from the perversion of history and applied them to their proper use according to his understanding. His religiosity contributed heavily to his discernment of politics. Quakers disseminated their theologico-political thought aggressively and retained a significant measure of political influence. Dickinson's political thought, given his education and religion, was influential towards the founding of the United States. The political theory of Quakers was informed by their theology and ecclesiology, consequently Dickinson applied his religious beliefs and his belief in adhering to the letter of the law in his approach to the Constitution, referring to his historical knowledge as he did so. Quakers did use secular history as a guide for their political direction, and they considered scripture the most important historical source.

Calvert has argued that Dickinson was an early feminist, partly attributable to Quaker culture. He believed that women were spiritually equal to men and deserved equal religious rights. Unlike many men of the era, Dickinson sought and took political counsel from women, particularly from his wife and his mother. Dickinson was also good friends with Quaker feminist Susanna Wright and corresponded with Catharine Macaulay and Mercy Otis Warren. He encouraged both Warren and Macaulay to continue writing. He bought books that detailed the lives of strong Quaker women. As a lawyer, Dickinson often defended poor women in court, including Rachel Francisco, a "free mollato" who had been charged with infanticide. In 1776, while drafting the Articles of Confederation, Dickinson proposed the first gender inclusive language in an American constitution. In the proposed religious liberty clause, he wrote "No person or persons in any Colony living peaceably under the Civil Government shall be molested or prejudiced in his or their [his or her] persons or Estate for his or her religious persuasion or Practise, nor be compelled to frequent or maintain or contribute to maintain any religious Worship, Place of Worship, or Ministry, contrary to his or her Mind."

== Almanac ==
Delaware elections were held on October 1, and members of the General Assembly took office on October 20 or the following weekday. The State Legislative Council was created in 1776, and its members served a three-year term. Beginning in 1792, it was renamed the State Senate. State Assemblymen had a one-year term. The whole General Assembly chose the state president for a three-year term.

Pennsylvania elections were also held in October. Assemblymen had a one-year term. The Pennsylvania Supreme Executive Council was created in 1776, and counselors were popularly elected for three-year terms. A joint ballot of the Pennsylvania General Assembly and the Council chose the president from among the twelve counselors for a one-year term. Both assemblies chose the Continental Congressmen for a one-year term as well as the delegates to the Constitutional Convention, which convened in Philadelphia from May 25 to September 17, 1787.

Public Offices
Office	State	Type	Location	Began office	Ended office	notes
Assemblyman	Lower Counties	Legislature	New Castle	October 20, 1759	October 20, 1760	
Assemblyman	Lower Counties	Legislature	New Castle	October 20, 1760	October 20, 1761	
Assemblyman	Pennsylvania	Legislature	Philadelphia	October 1762	October 1763	
Assemblyman	Pennsylvania	Legislature	Philadelphia	October 1763	October 1764	
Delegate	Pennsylvania	Legislature	New York	October 7, 1765	October 19, 1765	Stamp Act Congress
Delegate	Pennsylvania	Legislature	Philadelphia	August 2, 1774	October 26, 1774	Continental Congress
Delegate	Pennsylvania	Legislature	Philadelphia	March 16, 1775	October 21, 1775	Continental Congress
Delegate	Pennsylvania	Legislature	Philadelphia	October 21, 1775	November 7, 1776	Continental Congress
Delegate	Delaware	Legislature	Philadelphia	January 18, 1779	December 22, 1779	Continental Congress
Delegate	Delaware	Legislature	Philadelphia	December 22, 1779	February 10, 1781	Continental Congress
Councilman	Delaware	Legislature	Dover	October 20, 1781	November 13, 1781	
State President	Delaware	Executive	Dover	November 13, 1781	November 7, 1782	Executive Council
State President	Pennsylvania	Executive	Philadelphia	November 4, 1782	October 18, 1785	
Delegate	Delaware	Convention	Philadelphia	May 14, 1787	September 17, 1787	U.S. Constitution
Delegate	Delaware	Convention	Dover	November 29, 1791	June 12, 1792	State Constitution
State Senator	Delaware	Legislature	Dover	January 6, 1793	January 6, 1794	

Delaware General Assembly service
Dates	Assembly	Chamber	Majority	Governor	Committees	District
1781/82	6th	State House	non-partisan	Caesar Rodney		Kent at-large
1793	17th	State Senate	Republican	Joshua Clayton		New Castle at-large

== See also ==
- Delaware Historical Society – website
- University of Delaware – Library website
- Historical Society of Pennsylvania – website
- John Dickinson Plantation – website
- Wilmington Quaker Meeting House (burial site)

Political offices
Preceded by Caesar Rodney	President of Delaware; 1781–1783	Succeeded by John Cook
Preceded by William Moore	President of Pennsylvania; November 7, 1782 – October 18, 1785	Succeeded by Benjamin Franklin

== Bibliography ==
- Bell, Whitfield J.; Greifenstein, Charles Jr. (1997). Patriot-Improvers: Biographical Sketches of Members of the American Philosophical Society. Vol. 1. Philadelphia: American Philosophical Society. pp. 383–390. ISBN 9780871692269.
- Bushman, Claudia L.; Hancock, Harold Bell; Homsey, Elizabeth Moyne (1988). Proceedings of the House of Assembly of the Delaware State, 1781-1792, and of the Constitutional Convention of 1792. University of Delaware Press. ISBN 978-0-87413-309-7.
- Calvert, Jane E. (2009). Quaker Constitutionalism and the Political Thought of John Dickinson. Cambridge University Press. ISBN 978-0-521-88436-5.
- Calvert, Jane (July 4, 2019). "The Friendly Jurisprudence and Early Feminism of John Dickinson". In Dreisbach, Daniel L.; Hall, Mark David (eds.). Great Christian Jurists in American History. Cambridge University Press. pp. 80–89. ISBN 978-1-108-47535-8.
- Conrad, Henry C. (1908). History of the State of Delaware. Lancaster, Pennsylvania: Wickersham Company.
- Dickinson, John (1769). Letters from a Farmer in Pennsylvania. Philadelphia: Printed by William and Thomas Bradford, at the London coffee-house.
- Dickinson, John (March 3, 2026). Letters from a Farmer in Pennsylvania. Mercer University Press. ISBN 979-8-89736-020-8.
- Ehrlich, Eugene; Carruth, Gorton (1982). The Oxford Illustrated Literary Guide to the United States. New York: Oxford University Press. p. 217. ISBN 0-19-503186-5.
- Garrison, Webb B. (1997). Lincoln's Little War. Rutledge Hill Press. ISBN 978-1-55853-460-5.
- Ferling, John (2011). Independence: The Struggle to Set America Free. New York: Bloomsbury Press. p. 132. ISBN 9781608193974.
- Flower, Milton E. (1983). John Dickinson – Conservative Revolutionary. Charlottesville, Virginia: University Press of Virginia. ISBN 0-8139-0966-X.
- Hoffecker, Carol E. (2004). Democracy in Delaware. Wilmington, DE: Cedar Tree Books. ISBN 1-892142-23-6.
- FTP, Fodor's Travel Publications (2003). The Thirteen Colonies: Travel Historic America. Fodor's Travel Publications. ISBN 978-1-4000-1231-2.
- Lubert, Howard L. (2008). "John Dickinson". In Gregg; Hall, Mark David (eds.). America's Forgotten Founders. University of Louisville. p. 97.
- Middlekauff, Robert (2005). The Glorious Cause: The American Revolution 1763–1789. Oxford University Press. pp. 161–162.
- Powell, John H. (1936). "John Dickinson and the Constitution". The Pennsylvania Magazine of History and Biography. 60 (1).
- Smith, Page (1962). John Adams. Doubleday, Incorporated.
- Stillé, Charles J. (1891). The life and times of John Dickinson. Philadelphia, The Historical Society of Pennsylvania.
- Stille, Charles J. (2010). The Life and Times of John Dickinson 1732–1808. Kessinger Publishing.
- McGuire, Thomas J. (2007). The Philadelphia Campaign, Volume II: Germantown and the Road to Valley Forge. Stackpole Books.
