= Hannah Griffitts =

18th century American poet

Hannah Griffitts (1727–1817) was an 18th-century American poet and Quaker who championed the resistance of American colonists to Britain during the run-up to the American Revolution.

== Early life ==
Griffitts was born into a Quaker family in Philadelphia, and lived in that city for the entirety of her long life. Her parents were Thomas and Mary Norris Griffitts, and she had a sister, Mary, and a brother, Isaac. As a granddaughter of the merchant Isaac Norris, Griffitts was a member of a prominent Pennsylvania Quaker family. One of Griffitts' second cousins was Mary Norris, who would marry Founding Father John Dickinson, and another cousin was Hannah Harrison, who later married leading Patriot Charles Thomson.

Griffitts knew early on that she wanted to be a poet, and when she was just 10 years old she made a promise to God that her poetry would include "no trifling themes". In 1751, with both her parents dead and her brother Isaac in disgrace because of financial misdeeds and alcoholism, she went to live with some of her Norris cousins at an estate known as Fairhill. She stayed at Fairhill for over a decade, becoming especially close to Mary Norris, and the two corresponded regularly as adults. Griffitts never married, at one point writing, "everyone is not fitted for the single Life, nor was I ever moulded for the wed[d]ed one." From the 1770s to the 1790s she took in and cared for several elderly relatives, among them her sister Mary.

== Poetry ==
Griffitts is best known for a series of scathing satires that celebrate the American colonists' opposition to Britain in the decades before the American Revolution. For example, she wrote several proto-feminist poems about the Daughters of Liberty, a group of women active in protesting British policies in the Thirteen Colonies. "The Female Patriots" (1768) contains references that are implicitly critical of the Sugar Act 1764 and the Townsend Duties of 1767, which were measures intended to raise revenues in the colonies by taxing and controlling goods such as molasses and tea. In the poem, Griffitts also castigates male colonists who fail to stand up to the British:

Since the Men from a Party, on fear of a Frown,
Are kept by a Sugar-Plumb, quietly down.
Supinely asleep, & deprived of their Sight
Are stripped of their Freedom, and robbed of their Right.
If the Sons (so degenerate) the Blessing despise,
Let the Daughters of Liberty, nobly arise,
And tho' we've no Voice, but a negative here.
The use of the Taxables, let us forebear.
—from Hannah Griffitts, "The Female Patriot"

Despite her stirring rhetoric, Griffitts, like many other Quakers of the period, was uneasy at the prospect of violence and supported a negotiated solution to overtaxation rather than outright revolution. After war broke out, she raged against radicals like Thomas Paine, calling him a "Snake beneath the Grass" in one of her poems, whose views had prevailed over those of the moderates. She refused to leave Philadelphia even after it was seized by the British in the Philadelphia campaign, and she continued to maintain her antiwar stance. Although the neutralist American Quakers were sometimes seen as de facto Loyalists during the war, Griffitts was as quick to criticize the British as the Americans. For instance, she perceived the Mischianza—an elaborate fête that the British arranged in 1778 to honor General George Howe on his departure for England—as an example of the degeneracy of British culture.

Griffitts' writing throughout her life reflected empathy with people's suffering, and she wrote many elegies for parents who had lost their children, as well as for fellow Quakers and friends like the poet Susanna Wright.

In this period, the British and American literary establishments were largely hostile to the work of women poets. Perhaps in reaction to this situation, Griffitts did not attempt to publish her poems, instead circulating them among her largely female network of friends and acquaintances. A few found their way into print, probably without her authorization, in such publications as the Pennsylvania Chronicle, and the Pennsylvania Evening Post.

Recent scholarship has shown how women of the period used commonplace books as a method of creating a private, informal historical record of their own era. Some 60 of Griffitts' poems are included in her second cousin Milcah Martha Moore's commonplace book, a compilation of poetry and prose that was first published in 1997 under the title Milcah Martha Moore's Book. Under the pen name 'Fidelia' (derived from the Latin fidelitas meaning 'faithfulness' or 'loyalty'), Griffitts is one of the three dominant contributors to Moore's commonplace book, along with Susanna Wright and Elizabeth Graeme Fergusson, whose salon at Graeme Park was one of the literary centers of Philadelphia. Apparently, Griffitts used this pseudonym only when sending out clean copies of her poems; she signed her letters with her real name, and her own rough drafts often carry her initials. A small paperback volume of draft poems and working notes is still extant.

Griffitts died in 1817, and her manuscripts (including several hundred poems and a large number of letters) are now held by the Historical Society of Pennsylvania.
