= New London Academy =

New London Academy may refer to:

- United States Coast Guard Academy, New London, Connecticut
- New London Academy (Pennsylvania)
- New London Academy (Virginia)
- A former name for Colby–Sawyer College, New Hampshire
