= Proprietary Party =

The Proprietary Party, also known as the Gentleman's Party, was a political party in the Pennsylvania Colony, primarily concerned with Anglicanism and supporting the rights of the colonies hereditary proprietors, the Penns. They were typically in opposition to the Quaker Party, which sometimes resulted in violence.

They were originally called the Proprietary Party, changed their name to the Gentlemen's Party in the 1740s, and reverted to the Proprietary Party in the 1750s.

The Paxton Boys' March on Philadelphia was preventing from entering by a delegation of Philadelphians with the promise that the legislature would discuss their complaints; however, this did not happen, and the party took advantage of publicizing it in 1764.

The party opposed the Stamp Act of 1765, allying themselves with Benjamin Franklin's opposition to the Act and placing themselves in leadership positions. They later opposed Franklin's appointment to the position of Colonial Agent in London.

== Ideology and policies ==
The Proprietary Party primarily focused on supporting the Penns, in political and property rights. They also wanted military defense for the province, including the drafting of indentured servants, as well as the ability to print paper money. They attempted to comparatively weaken the Quaker party in the General Assembly of Pennsylvania by appealing to those on the Frontier.

== Notable individuals ==
James Logan was the first leader, as the Proprietary Council's Secretary, and mobilized Proprietary supporters. In the 1740s, William Allen became the party leader, and lead with Richard Peters. Nicholas Scull II was a Placeman for the party in the position of Surveyor General of Pennsylvania. George Thomas, a Proprietary governor, led a Quaker assembly.

== Andrew Hamilton and Isaac Norris ==
Andrew Hamilton, of the party, abdicated from the assembly in 1739. Isaac Norris and Hamilton had an enmity. This abdication led to increased determination on William Allen's part to attain power in the assembly.

== Election day riot ==
On October 1, 1742, Election Day in Pennsylvania, a physical fight over voting occurred between the Quakers and the Proprietary Party, each respectively represented by Isaac Norris and William Allen in the election for the Inspector of Elections. The Philadelphia County Courthouse was the only place to vote. Quakers arrived first and blocked Proprietary voters. Many more votes for Norris were cast (by physically standing near him), but, before the election was finished, 60 sailors, thought to be employed by Allen, armed with clubs entered and began attacking Pennsylvania Germans. They responded, and a vigorous fight between the two occurred, with the Proprietary sailors losing and retreating.
