= Family of William Allen (loyalist) =

On February 16, 1734, William Allen married Margaret Hamilton, daughter of Andrew Hamilton, famed defense lawyer in the John Peter Zenger case of 1735, and brother of James Hamilton. William and Margaret had six children: John, Andrew, James, William, Anne and Margaret. Like their father, all of Allen's sons were loyalists opposed the overthrow of British rule in the American Colonies.

== John Allen ==
John was elected to the Provincial Congress of New Jersey in 1776, but left over his opposition to the war. He married Mary Johnston (b. 1754), a daughter of merchant David Johnston, in 1775. Allen died in Philadelphia in 1778.

== Andrew Allen ==
Andrew became Attorney-General of Pennsylvania, was a member of Pennsylvania's delegation to the Continental Congress, and served on the Council of Safety. Upon his resignation from the Continental Congress, he joined Howe's army as a non-combatant, and returned to Philadelphia during the British occupation. His estate was confiscated as a result of the Pennsylvania Attainder Act of 1778. In 1792, he was pardoned, and unsuccessfully attempted to recover some of his assets under the Jay Treaty of 1794. He left for England, and died in London in 1825.

== James Allen ==
James Allen was the third son of Chief Justice William Allen and his wife Margaret, daughter of Andrew Hamilton, Attorney-General of the Province. He was born about 1742. He studied law with Edward Shippen and afterwards at the Temple. He was elected a Common Councilman of Philadelphia October 6, 1767, and in May, 1776, was sent to the Assembly from Northampton County. During the war, he retired to his home in Northampton (present-day Allentown) and lived as a non-combatant. He was a guest of Washington at Harlem Heights in November, 1776, and was summoned before the Committee of Public Safety for "disaffection." He died at Trout Hall, his residence in Northampton County, in 1778.

== William Allen, Jr. ==
William was one of the first officers commissioned by the Continental Congress, and served under Montgomery in the 1775 Canadian campaign. Immediately after the adoption of the Declaration of Independence, however, he resigned his officer's commission in the Continental Army, and became the Lieutenant-Colonel of a regiment called the "Pennsylvania Loyalists," which he commanded throughout the war. He left for London at the war’s end, and died there in 1838.

== Anne Allen ==
In 1766, Anne married John Penn, the last proprietary governor of Pennsylvania..

== Margaret Allen ==
In 1771, Allen's daughter Margaret married James De Lancey, the eldest son of former New York provincial governor James De Lancey.
