= Ronald Frank Thiemann =

American political theologian

Ronald Frank Thiemann (1946 – November 29, 2012) was an American political theologian and Benjamin Bussey Professor of Theology at Harvard Divinity School. His research in large part focused on the role of religion in public life. He was dean of Harvard Divinity School from 1986 to 1998.

== Biography ==
Thiemann, an ordained Lutheran minister, held an M.A. from Concordia Senior College, a M.Div. from Concordia Seminary, and both an M.A. and a Ph.D. from Yale University. He was a professor in the Religion Department at Haverford College, where he also served as acting provost and acting president (1985–86) before joining Harvard University in 1986.

Thiemann held the Benjamin Bussey Professorship of Theology, the oldest endowed chair in theology at Harvard. He was a faculty associate of the Weatherhead Center for International Affairs in the Faculty of Arts and Sciences, and was a Faculty Fellow at the John F. Kennedy School's Hauser Center for Nonprofit Organizations, where he served on the steering committee of the center's Joint Program in Religion and Public Life. He was a faculty affiliate at the Kennedy School's Harvard Center for Public Leadership and received a fellowship from the center in support of his research project. He worked on a book-length project entitled Prisoners of Conscience: Public Intellectuals in a Time of Crisis, which examines the courageous stance of four public figures—Anna Akhmatova, Albert Camus, Langston Hughes and George Orwell—during the tumultuous period of 1914–45. In 2006 Thiemann represented the U.S. National Academies of Science on a lecture tour of universities and research centers in the Islamic Republic of Iran.

While acting president of Haverford College, Thiemann officiated at the May 1986 graduation ceremonies during which honorary doctorates were to be awarded to Edwin Bronner, Robert M. Gavin Jr., Eleanor Holmes Norton and Andrew L. Lewis, Jr. Lewis, head of the Union Pacific Railroad, had recently served as U.S. Secretary of Transportation in the cabinet of Ronald Reagan and overseen the lockout of striking air traffic controllers in 1981. 28 of the college's 90 faculty had signed a letter protesting the award of the honorary doctorate to Lewis. On the dais, Lewis unexpectedly declined the award citing the lack of consensus, prompting the stunned audience to rise in applause at his action which honored the college's commitment to operating by consensus. President Thiemann later praised Lewis, calling his decision "an act of great courage and integrity".

== Pornography case ==
Thiemann lived in a Harvard-owned residence, using a Harvard-owned computer. In fall 1998 he requested that a bigger hard drive be installed in the computer. A technician then uploaded the old files to the university's mainframe computer in order to install a new drive. When asked by his supervisor why this process took so long, the technician at first did not want to reply, but later mentioned the large number of image files with file names that suggested sexually explicit content. The supervisor informed University President Neil L. Rudenstine who then suggested that the dean resign but be allowed to stay as a tenured member on the Harvard faculty. Thiemann resigned in November 1998. The story was broken by the Boston Globe beginning in May 1999, and attracted the notice of national media such as Newsweek.

After a review, the University President stated that the staff had acted properly in the incident.

The Harvard law professor Alan Dershowitz wrote, in a letter to the editor of the Boston Globe, "Surely Dean Thiemann would not have been asked to resign if he had been found using his Harvard-owned computer to keep track of his private stamp collection. Nor would he have been asked to leave if a cleaning person had found a copy of a pornographic magazine in the desk drawer of his Harvard-owned residence. What, then, is the principle, and where are the lines to be drawn?"

== Bibliography ==
=== Books ===
- Thiemann, Ronald F. The Humble Sublime: Secularity and the Politics of Belief. New York: I.B. Tauris, 2013. ISBN 1780767447.
- ------. Constructing a Public Theology: The Church in a Pluralistic Culture. Louisville, Kentucky: Westminster/John Knox, 1991. ISBN 0-664-25130-7.
- ------. Revelation and Theology: The Gospel as Narrated Promise. Notre Dame, Indiana: University of Notre Dame Press, 1985. ISBN 0-268-01629-1.
- ------. Religion in Public Life: A Dilemma for Democracy. Washington, District of Columbia: Georgetown University Press, 1996. ISBN 0-87840-610-7.

=== Book chapters ===
- Thiemann, Ronald F. "The Constitutional Tradition: A Perplexing Legacy", in Law and Religion: A Critical Anthology, edited by Stephen M. Feldman. New York: New York University Press, 2000. ISBN 0-8147-2679-8.
- ------. Introduction to Joan Halifax, A Buddhist Life in America: Simplicity in the Complex. New York: Paulist, 1998. ISBN 0-8091-3785-2.

=== Editor ===
- Bane, Mary Jo, Brent Coffin and Ronald F. Thiemann, eds. Who Will Provide: The Changing Role of Religion in American Social Welfare. Boulder, Colorado: Westview, 2000. ISBN 0-8133-3876-X.
- Noll, Mark A. and Ronald F. Thiemann, eds. Where Shall My Wond'ring Soul Begin? The Landscape of Evangelical Piety and Thought. Grand Rapids, Michigan: Wm. B. Eerdmans, 2000. ISBN 0-8028-4639-4.
- Thiemann, Ronald F., ed. The Legacy of H. Richard Niebuhr. Minneapolis, Minnesota: Fortress, 1991. ISBN 0-8006-7084-1.
- ------ and William C. Placher, eds. Why Are We Here? Everyday Questions and the Christian Life. Harrisburg, Pennsylvania: Trinity International, 1998. ISBN 1-56338-236-9.
