= Fidelia (pseudonym) =

English pseudonym

Fidelia was a favoured female pseudonym among writers in English in the 18th century. It was derived from the Latin fidelitas, meaning faithfulness.

== Usage ==
Hester Chapone adopted Fidelia as her protagonist's pseudonym in "The Story of Fidelia" (1753–1754), in Nos 77–79 of the English newspaper The Adventurer. Mary Ann Radcliffe did likewise in a short piece of sentimental fiction.

Among the writers who used Fidelia as an author's pseudonym for their own work were the Englishwomen Mary Astell (1666–1731) and Jane Barker (1652–1732), and the Americans Sarah Prince Gill (1728–1771), Hannah Griffitts (a Quaker, 1727–1817) and Sukey Vickery (1779–1821).

Back in England, the Lincoln poet who used the name Fidelia in The Gentleman's Magazine in 1734–1735 may have been Keziah (died 1742), a sister of John Wesley. She wrote to belittle an award of £50 offered as a poetry prize ("you forget the price of a candle") and propose instead that the prize should be the hand of Jonathan Swift in marriage. This sparked off exchanges of verses with the Welsh poet Jane Brereton (1685–1740) and the English poet Elizabeth Carter (1717–1806).

== Compliment ==
In modern times, the description Fidelia has sometimes been used as a compliment to a woman.

== See also ==
- List of pseudonyms
