= New London Academy (Pennsylvania) =

The New London Academy was the first public school established in Pennsylvania. It was formed in 1743, by Presbyterian minister Francis Alison, as a "Free School" in his home in New London, Pennsylvania. Among its alumni were George Read, Thomas McKean and John Dickinson.

During its early years, the school was run under the auspices of the Philadelphia Synod of the Presbyterian Church. The school changed its name and location several times, moving to Newark, Delaware, by 1765.

The original building in New London later housed the New London High School. Students from New London now attend the Avon Grove High School.

== Sources ==
- Presentation on history of Avon Grove schools
