= John Kinsey (Quaker leader) =

American Quaker leader and politician (c. 1693 – 1750)

Presiding Clerk of the Philadelphia Yearly Meeting
- In office 1730–1750

Speaker of the Pennsylvania Provincial Assembly
- In office 1739–1745
- Preceded by: Andrew Hamilton
- Succeeded by: John Wright
- In office 1745/1746 – May 11, 1750
- Preceded by: John Wright
- Succeeded by: Isaac Norris

Attorney General of Pennsylvania
- In office 1738–1741
- Preceded by: Joseph Growden Jr.
- Succeeded by: Tench Francis Sr.

Chief Justice of the Supreme Court of Pennsylvania
- In office 1743 – May 11, 1750

Member of the Pennsylvania Provincial Assembly
- In office January 19, 1731 – ?
- Preceded by: David Potts

Speaker of the New Jersey Assembly
- In office 1730–1733
- Preceded by: John Johnstone
- Succeeded by: Joseph Bonnell

Member of the New Jersey Assembly
- In office 1727–1733

Personal details
- Born: c. 1693 Philadelphia, Pennsylvania, US
- Died: May 11, 1750 (aged 56–57)
- Children: 7 (including James)
- Occupation: Politician; Quaker leader; lawyer

John Kinsey (c. 1693 – May 11, 1750) was an American lawyer, politician, and Quaker leader. After being admitted to the bar in Philadelphia and in New Jersey, he was elected to the New Jersey Assembly and as speaker before moving to Philadelphia. A member of the Pennsylvania Provincial Assembly, he served as speaker near-continuously from 1739 until his death. He also served in other positions in colonial politics, including attorney-general (1738–1741), chief justice (1743–1750), and presiding clerk of the Philadelphia Yearly Meeting (1730–1750). Since his death, he has risen from obscurity for his important role in Quaker history.

== Early life and career ==
Kinsey was born circa 1693 in Philadelphia, to Sarah (née Stevens) and John Kinsey. Raised in a Quaker family, he was the son of a Quaker minister (who was also speaker of the New Jersey Assembly) and attended the local Friends' School before family moved out of the city in the early 1700s, settling in Woodbridge, New Jersey. He worked as an apprentice for a New York joiner, but went for a law career due to his "Inquisitive disposition, and a Genius for something above his then employ".

After presumably studying law in Philadelphia under David Lloyd, Kinsey was admitted to the bar in Philadelphia (1724) and in New Jersey (1725).

== Political and Quaker career ==
Kinsey joined the New Jersey Assembly in 1727 and became speaker in 1730. In 1730 or 1731, he moved to Philadelphia, though he still held both New Jersey legislative positions until 1733. On January 19, 1731, he was elected a member of the Pennsylvania Provincial Assembly to succeed David Potts. With the exception of a brief period in 1745 and possibly 1746, he served as speaker from October 15, 1739 until his death.

Kinsey served as attorney-general from 1738 until 1741, when the colonial deputy governor Sir George Thomas, 1st Baronet fired him after the assembly refused to provide Thomas' gubernatorial salary. Kinsey reconciled with Thomas in 1743 on several conditions: the assembly would release Thomas' salary; Thomas would reverse his opposition to passing several laws; and Kinsey would become chief justice, a position he served until his death. He was also trustee of the Pennsylvania General Loan Office trustee from 1739 until 1750.

Outside of politics, Kinsey became a prominent Quaker leader within the city, becoming known among the community's "men of renown". He led the Philadelphia Yearly Meeting as presiding clerk from 1730 until 1750 and served as a correspondent for the London Yearly Meeting. Kinsey was part of a 1737 commission on the Maryland–Pennsylvania border and chaired a 1745 commission to negotiate an alliance with the Haudenosaunee during the French and Indian Wars, and he his leadership positions to oppose the province's involvement in King George's War.

Thomas Wendel remarked in a 1973 Pennsylvania Magazine of History and Biography article that "Kinsey, by virtue of his leadership in Quaker affairs and his positions of attorney general and afterwards of chief justice, had a near monopoly on the reins of power until his death".

== Personal life, death, and legacy ==
In 1725, Kinsey married Mary Kearney; they had seven children, including James Kinsey.

Kinsey died on May 11, 1750, after falling ill while litigating before the New Jersey Supreme Court in Burlington. Edwin B. Bronner and Susan A. Hoffman argue that this illness may have been a stroke. He was buried two days after his death, though his exact burial place has been lost. It was discovered that Kinsey had been engaging in embezzlement, with a £3,000 debt to the General Loan Office; this was a blow to the Quaker community amidst their warnings against poor behavior and he fell to obscurity afterwards.

Despite his obscure nature, Kinsey has been subject to academic study, with Bronner calling him "one of the most important Quaker political figures in the colonial era since William Penn". He has widely received credit for several political reforms within New Jersey, including the first compilation of the state's laws.

== Works ==
- The Acts of the General Assembly of the Province of New-Jersey (1732)
- The Charters and Acts of Assembly of the Province of Pennsylvania (1742)
