= Margaret Hill Morris =

American diarist

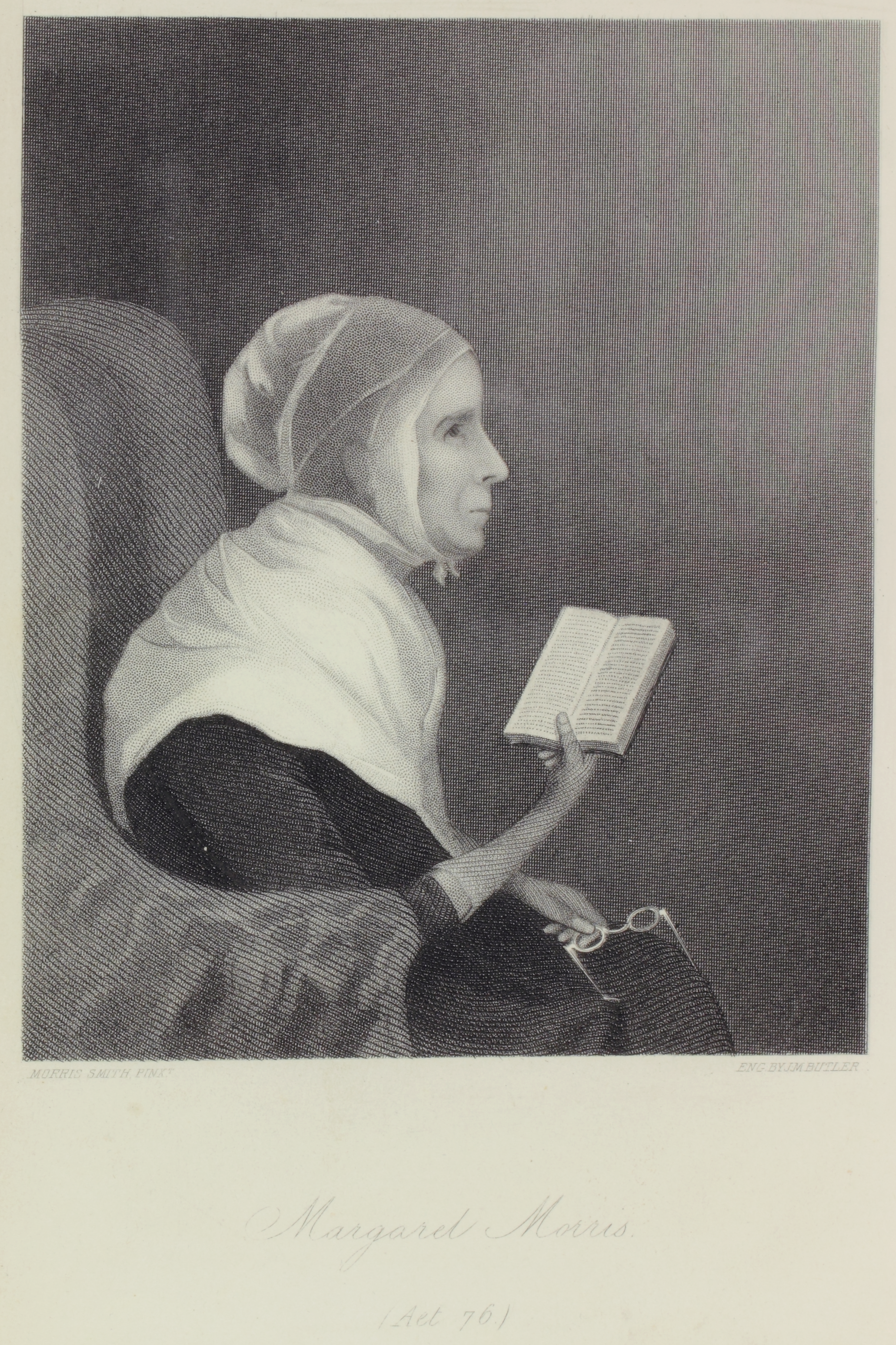
- Born: Margaret Hill; November 2, 1737; South River
- Died: October 10, 1816; Burlington
- Occupation: Diarist
- Spouse(s): William Morris, Jr. (m. 1758; died 1766)
- Children: 6
- Relatives: Milcah Martha Moore

Margaret Hill Morris (November 2, 1737 – October 10, 1816) was a Colonial American Quaker medical practitioner and diarist. Her journal provides a first hand account of events of the American Revolutionary War in and around Burlington, New Jersey, including the 1776 Battle of Trenton.

== Life ==
Margaret Hill was born on November 2, 1737 in South River, Maryland. She was the daughter of Richard Hill, a Quaker doctor, merchant, amateur botanist, and slaveholder, and Deborah Moore, granddaughter of Lieutenant Governor Thomas Lloyd. She had eleven siblings, including poet Milcah Martha Moore.

In 1739, Hill's business ventures failed and he and his wife fled to Madeira to avoid creditors. They left Margaret and three of her siblings in Philadelphia with their eldest daughter, Hannah Hill Moore.

In 1758, she married William Morris, Jr., a Philadelphia dry goods merchant from a prominent Quaker family. He died in 1766, leaving her a widow with four children. In 1770, she relocated to Burlington, New Jersey near her sister, Sarah Hill Dillwyn, purchasing a house on the Delaware River formerly belonging to Governor William Franklin.

Though she had wealthy relations she could seek assistance from, Morris desired self-sufficiency and planned "getting into a little business", opening a medical and apothecary practice in 1779. She had a wealthy of knowledge to draw on as many of the women in her family were experienced healers and her father and brothers-in-law were physicians.

As pacifists Quakers, Morris and her family refused to participate in the Revolutionary War. In her journal, she lamented "What sad havoc will this dreadful war make in our land!" Morris treated soldiers on both sides of the conflict Morris' original journal is at Haverford College. Copies were published in 1836, and again in 1854 by her grandson, John Jay Smith.

After the war, Morris returned to Philadelphia. She treated patients during the 1793 Philadelphia yellow fever epidemic.

Margaret Hill Morris died in Burlington on October 10, 1816.

== Family ==
Margaret Hill Morris had six children, four of whom lived to adulthood:

- Richard Morris (September 28, 1759 – September 29, 1760) - Richard and John were twins, but Richard died at one year old.
- John Morris (September 28, 1759 – September 8, 1793) - became a physician and died of yellow fever.
- Deborah Morris Smith Collins (November 29, 1760 – March 15, 1822)
- Richard Hill Morris (September 5, 1762 – December 6, 1841)
- Mary Morris (June 19, 1764 – February 14, 1765)
- Gulielma Maria Morris Smith (August 18, 1766 – September 9, 1826)
