= Joseph Turner (loyalist) =

American lawyer

Joseph Turner (1701–1783) was a seaman, merchant, iron manufacturer, and politician in Philadelphia, where he served during the colonial era when the city was the capital of the Province of Pennsylvania, and following American independence, when it was the new nation's capital and largest and most influential city.

== Early life ==
Turner was born in 1701 in Hampshire, England.

== Career ==
In January 1714, Turner left England with his parents for Philadelphia in British America. Philadelphia records identify him as a sea captain in 1724 and a businessman in 1726. Decades prior to the American Revolution, he was a business partner of William Allen, the chief justice, and his firm, Allen and Turner, which was one of the most important in the Thirteen Colonies.

=== Commerce ===
Turner entered into trade agreements and iron mining and manufacture ventures, including the Union Iron Works in present-day High Bridge, New Jersey. With Allen and others, Turner participated in the importation and trade of slaves, which was then legal.

On March 18, 1732, Turner acquired the land that comprises present-day Allentown from Thomas Penn, a son of William Penn. The land was sold two years later, on September 10, 1735, to William Allen.

=== Politics ===
Turner was also engaged in politics. He was elected as a member of the Philadelphia City Council in 1729, an alderman in 1741, and as a member of Province of Pennsylvania's provincial council in 1747.

In 1745, Abram Taylor was elected mayor of Philadelphia, then a non-paying office, but declined to serve, for which he was fined thirty pounds. The Philadelphia city council then elected Turner to the office but he likewise refused it, for which he was similarly fined.

During the American Revolution, which lasted from 1775 to 1783, Turner was a staunch loyalist.

=== Other endeavors ===
Turner was a member of Benjamin Franklin's Junto and of the Dancing Assembly of 1748. He was a founder in 1749 of the Academy and Charitable School of Philadelphia, and then of the College of Philadelphia, which is now the University of Pennsylvania, and served as a trustee at both these institutions until his death in 1783.

== Death ==
Turner died in 1783 at approximately age 82.

== Legacy ==
Turner Street in Center City Allentown is named in his honor.
