= Isaac Norris (mayor) =

Mayor of Philadelphia

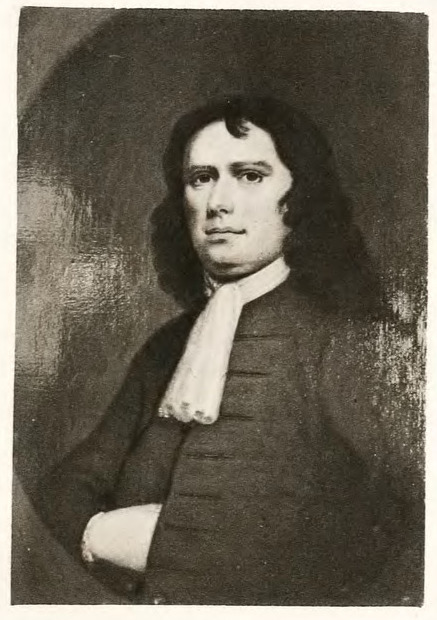
- Born: July 21, 1671; London
- Died: June 4, 1735
- Children: Isaac Norris

Isaac Norris (July 21, 1671 – June 4, 1735) was a merchant, slave trader and prominent figure in provincial Pennsylvania, including mayor of Philadelphia in 1724.

He was born in London, England, but his father, Thomas, moved to Jamaica when Isaac was seven years old. Isaac went to Philadelphia in 1690 to arrange for his family to move to that city, but on his return he found that they had all died in the great earthquake at Port Royal. He returned to Philadelphia, went into business, and became one of the wealthiest proprietors in Pennsylvania.

While he was in England in 1706 he came to the aid of William Penn in his difficulties and rescued him from imprisonment. On his return to Philadelphia two years later, he was elected to the governor's council, and from then until his death continued in public life. He was a member of the Pennsylvania Provincial Assembly for many years, its speaker in 1712, justice for Philadelphia County in 1717, and, on the organization of the high court of chancery, became a master to hear cases with the lieutenant-governor. He was elected mayor of Philadelphia in 1724. On the death of David Lloyd, he was unanimously chosen Justice of the Pennsylvania Supreme Court, but he declined and remained in the county court. For many years he was one of the chief representatives of the proprietaries, and by the will of Penn he was named a trustee of the province of Pennsylvania.

== Family ==
In 1694, Norris married Mary, daughter of Thomas Lloyd, president of the council. Their son, Isaac, succeeded his father in business and also became active in politics, serving as speaker of the Assembly. Norris died in Philadelphia on June 4, 1735.

== Slave ownership and manumission ==
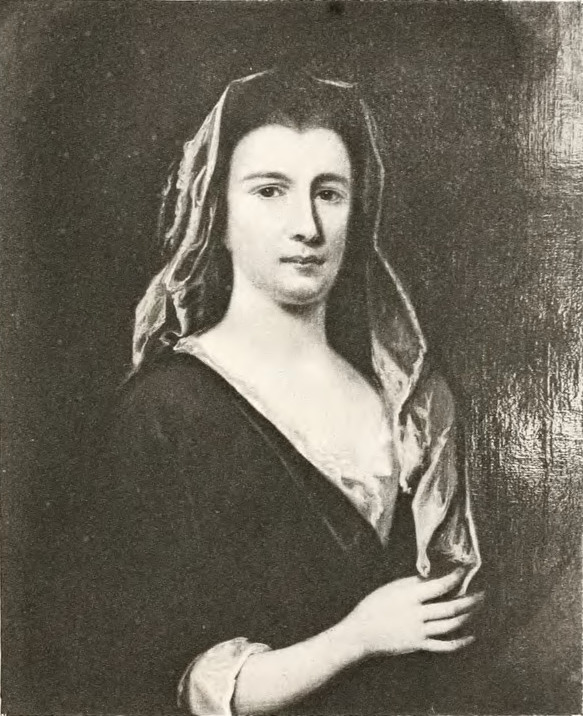
Mary Lloyd Norris

Norris was a slave owner. He and Mary Lloyd freed many of the slaves during their lifetimes or in their wills. Their children, including Elizabeth and Isaac Norris Jr., freed the rest of them.

For example, when Norris Sr. died in 1737, his will freed "Indian servant man Will (born in my house) . . . on or before 2 July 1740 on condition he serve his mistress whose property he will be." When Mary Lloyd Norris died a few years later, she willed to her daughter Elizabeth her "negro girl Dinah." Elizabeth freed Dinah twenty years later.

This was consistent with Quaker manumissions, which began in the 1730s, at the height of Quaker slave ownership, and peaked in the 1770s, by which time only about 19% of all inventoried Quakers owned slaves, and all of them freed them at their deaths.

== Legacy ==
Coat of Arms of Isaac Norris

The borough of Norristown, Pennsylvania is named for Norris, who in 1704 bought a large tract of land there from Penn.

| Preceded by Clement Plumsted | Mayor of Philadelphia; 1724–1725 | Succeeded by William Hudson |
