= Friends Meetinghouse (Wilmington, Delaware) =

Historic Quaker meetinghouse in Delaware, United States

- U.S. National Register of Historic Places
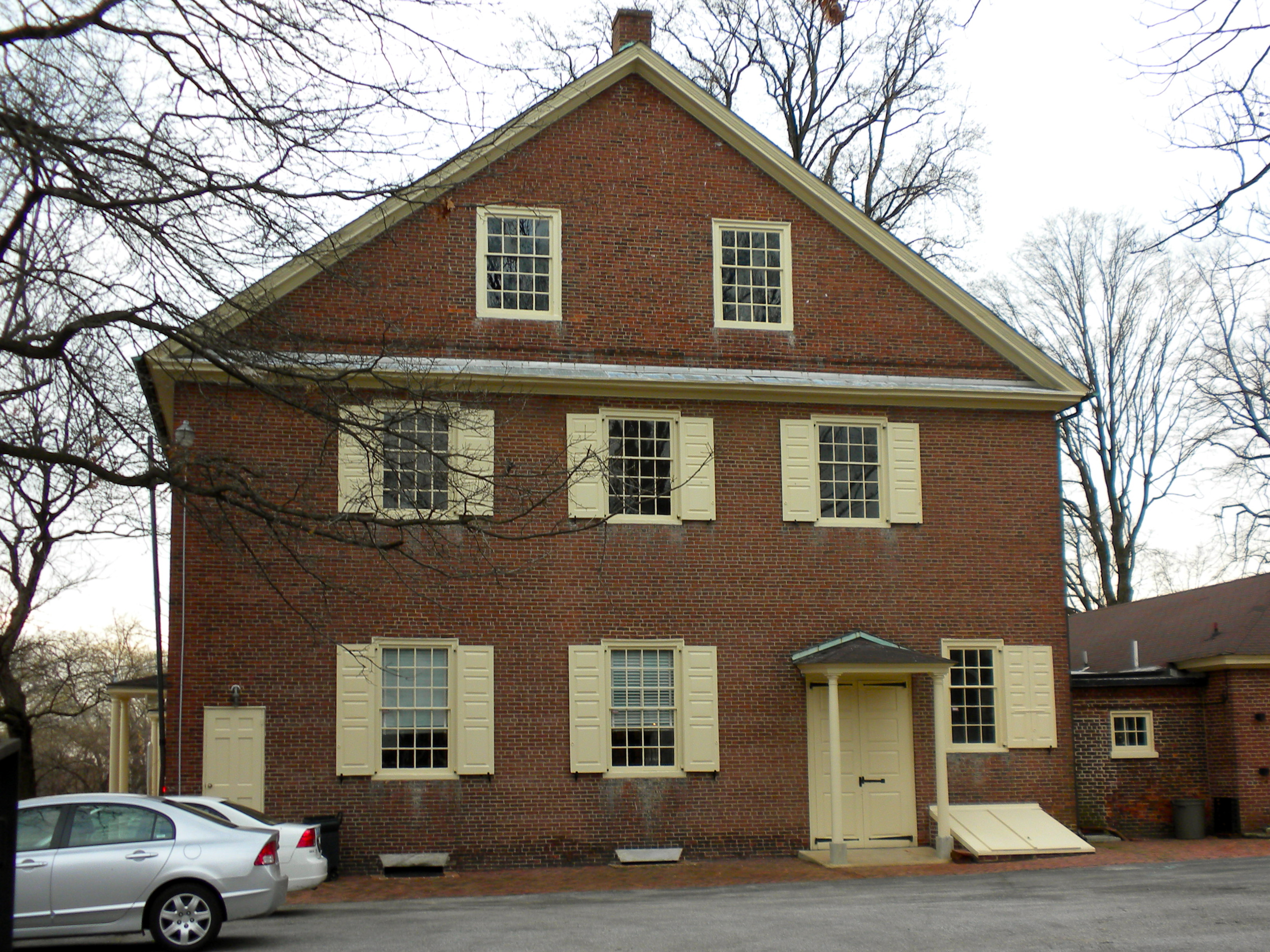

- Location within Delaware Location within the United States
- Location: 4th and West Sts., Wilmington, Delaware
- Coordinates: 39°44′32″N 75°33′15″W
- Area: 1 acre (0.40 ha)
- Built: 1817
- NRHP reference No.: 76000577
- Added to NRHP: November 07, 1976

Friends Meetinghouse is a historic Quaker meeting house at 4th and West Streets in Wilmington, Delaware in the Quaker Hill neighborhood. The meeting has a membership of about 400 and is part of the Philadelphia Yearly Meeting. It was built in 1815–1817 and added to the National Register of Historic Places in 1976.

== History ==
The first Quaker meeting for worship in Delaware was held in New Castle at the house of Governor Lovelace in September 1672, when George Fox visited the town. After William Penn became proprietor of the "Three Lower Counties," as Delaware was then known, regular meetings were formed in Newark, Centre and New Castle. Regular meetings did not begin in Wilmington until 1735 when William and Elizabeth Shipley built a one-story brick house near Fourth and Shipley Streets that was used for worship as a Preparative Meeting, officially beginning in 1738. In 1750 the status of Monthly Meeting was granted by the Concord Quarterly Meeting.

The first dedicated meetinghouse was built across the street from the current site in 1738 and measured 25 feet (7.6 m) square. The second meetinghouse was built in 1748 on the current site and could hold 500 people. The present building was opened on September 25, 1817 and is said to hold 700 people. A school was founded here in 1748 in the meetinghouse built in 1738, which has evolved into the Wilmington Friends School. In 1937 the school moved from Quaker Hill to the Alapocas neighborhood of Wilmington.

John Dickinson, the "penman of the Revolution," is buried in the adjoining burial ground, as are abolitionist Thomas Garrett and Delaware Governor Caleb P. Bennett. Garrett, one of the best known conductors on the Underground Railroad, was a member of the meeting, and lived on Quaker Hill at 227 Shipley Street. He worked closely with Harriet Tubman and is said to have helped 2,700 slaves reach freedom. About 1,500 people came to his funeral at the meetinghouse in January, 1871 where Lucretia Mott spoke.
