= Francis Alison =

Francis Alison (1705–1779) was a leading minister in the Synod of Philadelphia during the Old Side–New Side controversy.

== Biography ==
=== Early life and education ===
Alison was born in Donegal, Ireland and studied at the University of Glasgow. It appears he arrived in the United States in 1734 or 1735 in order to help the fledgling Presbyterian Church as a minister. He was ordained a full-fledged minister in 1737 and served the New London congregation.

=== Career ===
Alison always stood out as a great intellect and was frequently employed as a teacher both within and without the church. The parents of John Dickinson of Delaware, who would grow up to write the Farmer's Letters, hired Alison to tutor their children. His teaching grew from there by adding pupils and he ran an academy at Thunder Hill, near the village of New London, Pennsylvania. According to his letters to Ezra Stiles, President of Yale, he started this school about 1743. His teaching position at this school was funded by the Synod. He was allowed an assistant. In 1744, he was elected to the original American Philosophical Society. Alison left the New London school in 1752 in order to run a grammar school in Philadelphia and at the behest of Benjamin Franklin aid with the College of Philadelphia. He was the vice-provost in 1755. Unhappy with the growing influence of the Church of England at the College, he would later return to Delaware to run the New Ark Academy, which eventually merged with New Ark College to become the University of Delaware. The University of Glasgow made him a Doctor of Divinity in 1756.

=== Controversy ===
Francis Alison was at the center of much of the Old Side – New Side Controversy in the early Presbyterian Church, which was part of the Great Awakening. Alison was against the practices of the Great Awakening going so far as to help his presbytery pen a pamphlet entitled the Querists. This pamphlet was an attack on the doctrine of George Whitefield, a leading revivalist. Alison was part of the cause of the division in that he came to Synod seeking a judgment against Alexander Craighead, a New Side adherent. Alison had complained that Craighead had preached in Alison's church without permission. Craighead refused to let Donegal Presbytery put him on trial for the offense. Alison came to Synod seeking a trial against Craighead. This never occurred as the New Side would not allow it. This led to the Protest of 1741, which Alison signed. As a result of the Protest, Gilbert Tennent and his New Side friends left the Synod and formed their own. Alison did dissent from the ruling of the Synod of 1742. Alison wished the Synod would have revisited the whole affair, but he was in the minority. Alison continued with the Old Side Synod of Philadelphia after the Presbytery of New York left in 1746.

Upon the reunion of the two sides in 1758, which created the new Synod of New York and Philadelphia, Alison preached the opening sermon entitled "Peace and Union" from Ephesians 4:4-7. In the ensuing years, Alison always took the Old Side interpretation of theology; however, he remained a member of the Presbyterian Church.

=== Legacy ===
Alison is best known for his work in the church. His work led to the founding of the first Widows Fund in the church. He was known as the best Latin scholar in America. He taught many people who would go on to productive careers in the church. Foremost among them are Dr. John Ewing, Dr. James Latta, and Matthew Wilson. What is often overlooked is his influence on the founding of America. Three of the signers of the United States Declaration of Independence studied under Alison: Governor Thomas McKean, George Read, and James Smith. Charles Thomson who served as Secretary of the Continental Congress also was a pupil of Alison. Alison was in England when news of the signing of the Declaration of Independence arrived in England. He was far too old to participate, but all knew his sympathies lie with freedom. Upon his death, he freed his slaves.

== Archival collections ==
The Presbyterian Historical Society in Philadelphia, Pennsylvania has a collection of Francis Alison’s papers including sermons from 1752-1774, undated writings and documents relating to the Alison Family.
