= Edwin B. Bronner =

- Born: September 2, 1920
- Died: March 8, 2005

Edwin Blaine Bronner (1920 - 2005) was a historian and author of writings about the early English colonies in North America.

== Life ==
The oldest son of Blaine and Nellie Garretson Bronner, Edwin Bronner was born in Yorba Linda, California in 1920. He studied history at Whittier College from 1937-1941 and then obtained a master's degree from Haverford College in 1947 and a PhD from the University of Pennsylvania in 1952.

Bronner started his teaching career at Temple University in 1947 before teaching at Haverford College from 1962 to 1990, becoming Professor of History, Curator of the Quaker Collection and College Librarian.

Bronner was a Quaker and his father was a Quaker pastor. In 1947, he became a member of the Friend Historical Association, serving as president to the board several times until he became honorary director in 1997.

Bronner wrote several works about Quakerism, and more concretely, about William Penn.

== Books ==
- William Penn's Holy Experiment: The Founding of Pennsylvania, 1681-1701 (1962)
- Quakerism and Christianity (1967)
- "The Other Branch": London Yearly Meeting and the Hicksites, 1827-1942 (1970)
- William Penn, 17th Century Founding Father: Selections from His Political Writings (1975)
- The Papers of William Penn, Volume 5 (1986)
