= Samuel Fothergill =

Samuel Fothergill (1715–1772), was a Quaker minister.

== Education and early career ==
He was the sixth son of John Fothergill and his wife Margaret, well-to-do Quakers of considerable means at Carr End, Wensleydale, Yorkshire. He was born in November 1715. He was educated at Briggflats, near Sedbergh, and afterwards at a school at Sutton in Cheshire, kept by his uncle, Thomas Hough. At the age of seventeen he was apprenticed to a Quaker shopkeeper at Stockport.

As soon as his apprenticeship was over, he went to live at Sutton with his uncle, and united himself with the Society of Friends. For some years he seems to have passed through much mental trouble, and it was not until 1736 that he was accepted as a Quaker minister. No certificate to travel appears to have been issued to him until 1739. Some seven months previously he married Susanna Croudson of Warrington, also a Quaker minister. In this year he pastorally visited the Friends in Wales and the west of England, and in the following year those in Yorkshire and Durham. Early in 1744, he visited Ireland. His letters to his wife show that Quakerism there was declining, and that he made great efforts to revive it. In 1745, his ministerial journeys were much interrupted by the Jacobite rebellion, and from that time till 1750, when he was present at the yearly meeting of the Irish quakers, he chiefly laboured near his residence.

== Work abroad and return ==
In 1754 he obtained a certificate enabling him to pursue his work abroad, and immediately visited North America, where he remained till 1756, visiting nearly all the Quakers' meetings in the northern and many in the southern colonies. He rode 180 miles to visit one isolated family, and, from poverty, had occasionally to go without food himself to provide for his horse. He laboured to reconcile the colonists and the Indians. He was part of a circle that encouraged tax resistance, which was at that time a very controversial stand among English Friends, but which, partially through his efforts on his return, became more acceptable.

On his return to England he organised a subscription for the relief of the poverty occasioned by the scarcity of employment round Warrington during the winter of 1756, and resumed his ministerial work until his incessant labours caused a severe illness. He never completely recovered, and was afterwards mainly occupied in attending to his business as a tea merchant, and in some literary work which he never completed.

== Later appointments and death ==
In 1760 he was appointed one of a committee to visit all the quarterly and other meetings in the kingdom, and in 1762 he visited most of the Quaker meetings in Ireland. A similar service in Scotland two years later led largely to the revival of Quakerism in that country. From this time till his death he was unable to take any active part in the affairs of the Society of Friends, and his later years were passed in great suffering. He died at Warrington in June 1772, and was buried in the Friends' burial-ground at Penketh, Lancashire.

Fothergill was well read in books, and a keen student of men and manners. He is described as having been dignified, courteous, grave, and yet affable. His writings were chiefly tracts or brief addresses, but the number of times they have been reprinted proves them to have been highly valued by the Quakers.

== Works ==
- Memoirs of the life and gospel labours of Samuel Fothergill, with selections from his correspondence
- Ten discourses, delivered extempore, at several meeting-houses of the people called Quakers
- Eleven discourses, delivered extempore, at several meeting-houses of the people called Quakers
- Some discourses, epistles, and letters, by the late Samuel Fothergill (also)
