= Isaac Norris (statesman) =

American politician

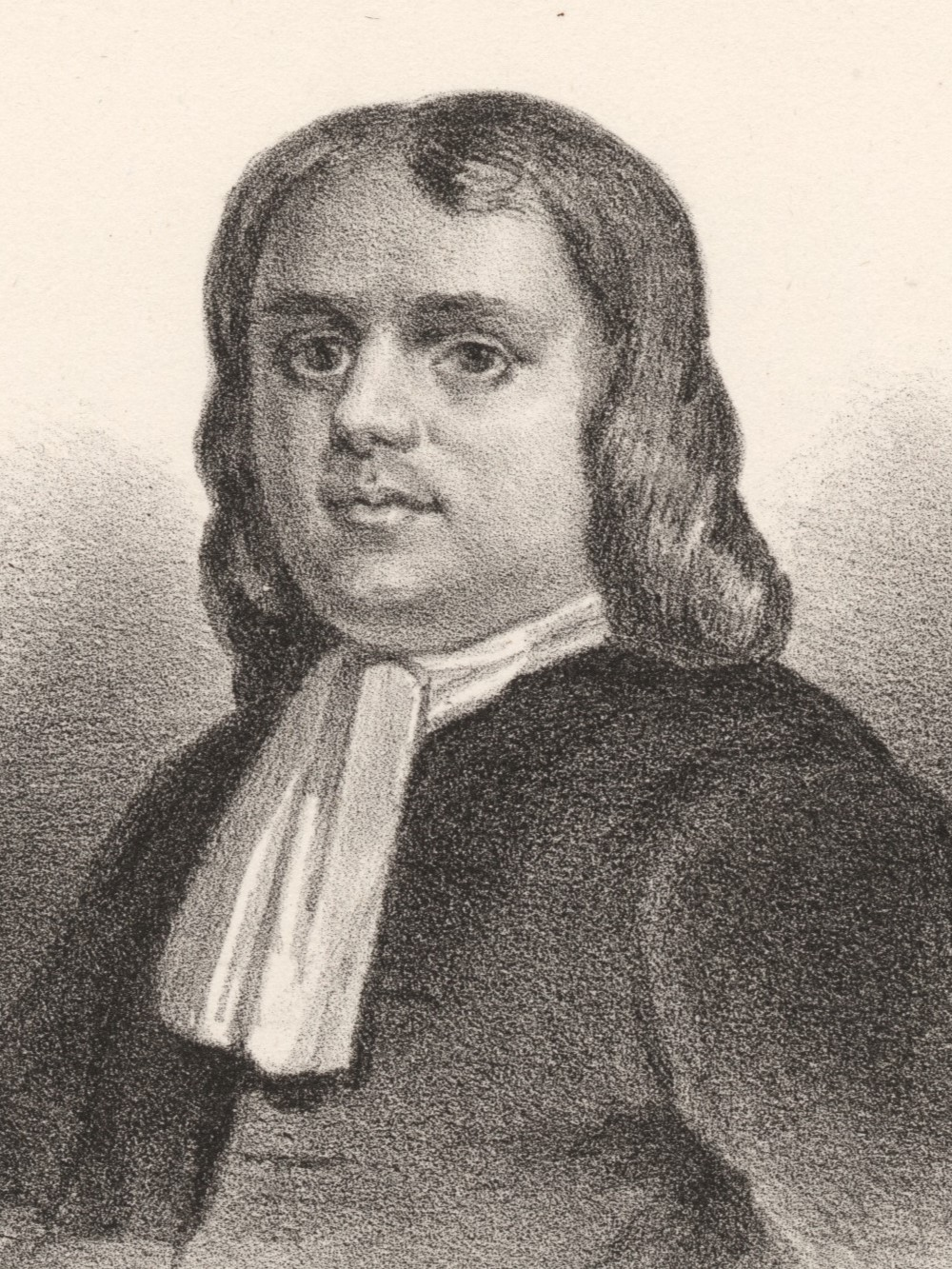
- Portrait of Norris by Max Rosenthal, c. 1853

Speaker of the Pennsylvania Assembly
- In office 1750–1764
- Preceded by: John Kinsey
- Succeeded by: Joseph Fox

Personal details
- Born: October 3, 1701 Philadelphia, Province of Pennsylvania, British America
- Died: June 13, 1766 (aged 64) Philadelphia, Province of Pennsylvania, British America
- Resting place: Friends Arch Street Meeting House Burial Ground in Philadelphia
- Party: Quaker
- Spouse: Sarah Logan (m. 1739)
- Children: Mary Norris Dickinson
- Parents: Isaac Norris; Mary Lloyd
- Education: Friends' School

Isaac Norris (October 3, 1701 – June 13, 1766) was a merchant and statesman in the colonial-era Province of Pennsylvania, in British America.

== Early life and education ==
Norris was born in Philadelphia in 1701, the son of Isaac Norris, a prosperous Quaker merchant and original participant in William Penn's establishment of the Province of Pennsylvania, and Mary Lloyd. Isaac was educated at Friends School in Philadelphia, and went abroad in 1722 and again from 1734 to 1735.

== Career ==
After his schooling in London, Norris returned to manage the family business, Norris and Company, on behalf of his ailing father. After his father died in 1735, the junior Isaac became a senior partner.

=== Political career ===
Engaged in business until 1743, Norris had acquired a large fortune, in addition to what he inherited from his father. He retired from business to devote himself to politics and public life.

Like his father before him, Norris entered into politics at an early age. He served as a councilman and alderman, a member of the Pennsylvania Provincial Assembly in 1734, and chairman of its most important committees. He was a Quaker of the strictest sect, and endeavored to keep the policy of Pennsylvania consistent with the principles of his religion. On the prospect of war with France and Spain in 1739, he opposed the organization of volunteer companies and preparation for the defense of the province. His followers, in opposition to the war party, were known as the "Norris party," and his subsequent election to the assembly was the occasion of violent political struggles between the Quakers and other residents of the city.

He was one of the commissioners to a treaty with the Albany Indians in 1745 and 1755, and he and his colleagues effected the purchase of several million acres comprising the southwestern part of Pennsylvania.

In 1751, he was elected speaker of the Pennsylvania Provincial Assembly, and held that office fifteen years. In the first year of his administration, the statehouse bell was ordered from England. Norris proposed that its inscription should be: "Proclaim liberty throughout the land unto all the inhabitants thereof," based on the Bible's book of Leviticus, chapter 25, verse 10.

During his speakership, the colonial representatives and the proprietaries had a long conflict about the taxation and legislative control of the Penn family estates. A leader of the Quakers, Norris joined the opponents of privilege. In a debate in the Assembly he declared, "No man shall ever stand on my grave and say, 'Curse him, here lies he who betrayed the liberties of his country!'"

In 1754, he was selected as a member of the Pennsylvania delegation, led by Benjamin Franklin, that attended the Albany Congress, a gathering of numerous colonial representatives to plan an approach to their defenses before the pending French and Indian War, the North American front of the Seven Years' War between Great Britain and France. Together with Benjamin Chew and Richard Peters, also of Philadelphia, he was on the committee that reviewed plans and chose Franklin's Albany Plan to propose to the full conference.

In 1757, Norris was appointed with Benjamin Franklin as a commissioner to England to work for the removal of grievances related to the proprietary instructions, but declined on account of failing health. Although he opposed the encroachments of the Penns, he would not support the proposition to convert Pennsylvania into a royal province. He resigned his speakership when, in 1764, a petition to that effect passed the Assembly. Norris was reelected again.

== Death ==
Due to poor health, he retired shortly thereafter. He died at his estate, "Fairhill". His death marked the passing of the Quakers' strong influence in Pennsylvania politics, as more people of other backgrounds came to power.

=== Scholar ===
Norris was an excellent French, Latin, and Hebrew scholar, collected a valuable library, and was active in educational and benevolent enterprises. He served as a trustee of the College and Academy of Philadelphia, now the University of Pennsylvania from 1751 until his resignation in 1755.

== Personal life ==
Well established after inheriting money and property from his father in 1739, Norris married Sarah Logan, the eldest daughter of James Logan. Logan was a former mayor of Philadelphia and former governor of the Province of Pennsylvania, and one of the wealthiest men in the English Colonies.

In 1742, the Norrises moved from Philadelphia to Fairhill, their family estate, in the present-day Northern Liberties section of Philadelphia.

Norris' daughter was Mary Norris Dickinson, who married John Dickinson.
