= Quaker Party =

The Quaker Party of Pennsylvania
- Founder: William Penn
- Ideology: Quakerism

The Quaker Party was a political party in the Pennsylvania Colony and later Commonwealth of Pennsylvania. They were affiliated with the Quakers, formally known as the Society of Friends. They dominated the Pennsylvania Assembly until the second half of the eighteenth century.

== Provincial Hegemony ==
The Quaker Party, under the Society of Friends, held an undisputed hegemony over the colony during its first decades, from 1682 to 1701, though this did not prevent disputes within the party over questions regarding liberty and property. By 1718 and the death of William Penn, this hegemony had vanished, as Penn's sons converted to Anglicanism, but continued to hold the hereditary position of Proprietor.

== Pre-1756 ==
Prior to 1756 the leadership of the party was drawn from the Society of Friends, but this control began to be challenged by a split in the party, between those who held to the traditionally pacifist views of the Quakers and those who felt such principles were inconsistent with the demands of government. This split came to a head in 1755, with the beginning of the French-Indian War, where the pacifist Quakers, now a minority in the assembly, were mostly forced to resign and be replaced by churchmen of the Party. The consequence of this was the Society of Friends losing the leadership of the party, with previously unaffiliated individuals including Benjamin Franklin joining the party and taking up leadership roles.

== Decline ==
In 1775, amongst the political turmoil preceding the revolutionary war, the majority of Quakers still engaged in politics withdrew, opening the door to the Test Act of 1777 that further sidelined the Party.
