= Keasbey =

Keasbey may refer to:

- Keasbey, New Jersey
- Anthony Quinton Keasbey (1824–1895), former US Attorney and author from New Jersey.
- Keasbey Nights album by Catch 22.
- Keasbey and Mattison Company
