= BoRit Asbestos =

Superfund site in Pennsylvania

- Superfund site
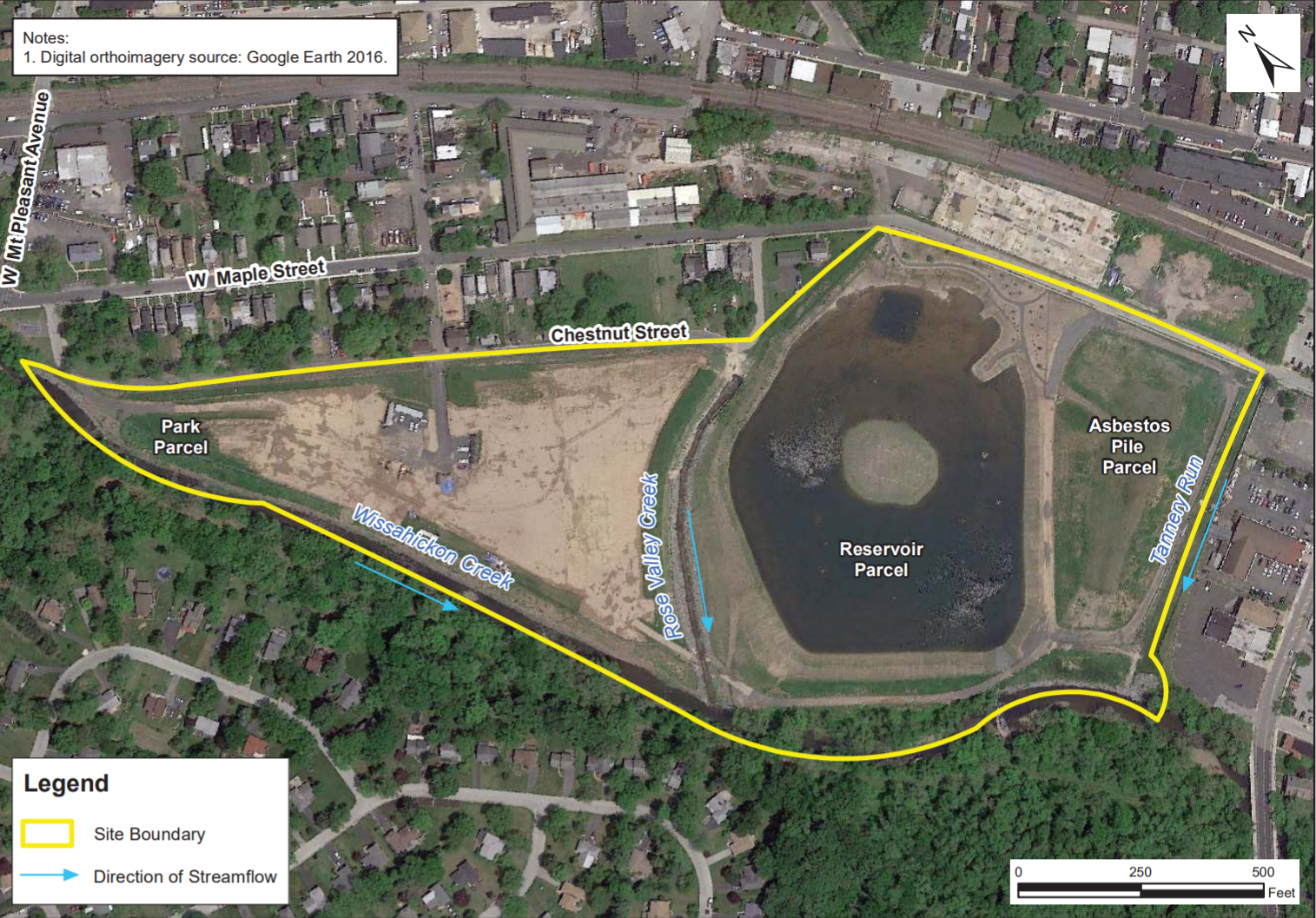
- Aerial view showing the three parcels of the BoRit Asbestos Superfund Site
- Location: Ambler, Upper Dublin, Whitpain, Montgomery County, Pennsylvania; 40°09′18″N 75°13′39″W

Information
- Contaminants: chrysotile asbestos
- Responsible parties: Keasbey and Mattison Company, Turner & Newall, CertainTeed Corporation, Nicolet Industries

Progress
- Proposed: 2006
- Listed: April 9, 2009

The BoRit Asbestos Superfund site is a 32-acre (13 ha) waste dump and reservoir in Ambler, Upper Dublin Township and Whitpain Township, Pennsylvania, that was contaminated with 1.5 million cubic yards (1.1×10^{6} m^{3}) of asbestos containing material due to the waste disposal practices of the Keasbey and Mattison (K&M) Company and Turner and Newall from 1897 to 1962. The site is named BoRit after Bob Rittenhouse, one of the recent owners of the site.

The site is divided into three parcels: an asbestos waste pile, a reservoir and a closed park. The asbestos waste pile was approximately 25 feet (7.6 m) and covered 2 1/2 acres (1.0 ha) of a 6-acre (2.4 ha) property. The reservoir was used for process water for manufacturing and is approximately 11 acres (4.5 ha) in size on a 15-acre (6.1 ha) lot. The berm of the reservoir was constructed from asbestos shingles, millboard and soil. The 11-acre (4.5 ha) Whitpain Wissahickon Park was used as an asbestos waste dump and then filled in and converted for usage as a park from 1973 to 1984 when it was closed and fenced-in due to asbestos contamination. The site also includes portions of Wissahickon Creek, Tannery Run Creek and Rose Valley Creek which run adjacent to the three parcels. The site is located in a densely populated borough with approximately 6,000 people living within 1/2 mile (0.80 km). It is the second largest asbestos dump site in the United States.

The U.S. Environmental Protection Agency (EPA) conducted an emergency removal action in 2008 which included capping the asbestos waste pile with a geotextile material and 2 feet of clean material and stream bank stabilization of the three creeks. The EPA added the site to the Superfund National Priorities List in April 2009. The total cost of site clean-up was approximately $26 million. The site is currently being monitored on a quarterly basis and after significant weather events to ensure the integrity of the cap and stabilized stream banks. A five-year review will be completed by the EPA in 2022.

== History ==
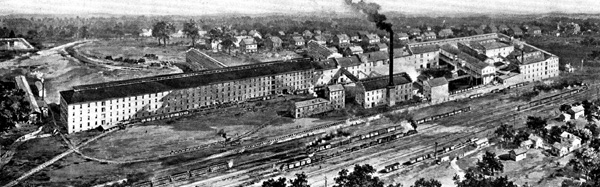
The Keasbey and Mattison Company plant in Ambler, Pennsylvania, (ca. 1900) manufactured asbestos containing material such as insulation and shingles.

In 1881, the Keasbey and Mattison (K&M) Company began the manufacture of asbestos-containing material such as insulation and shingles in Ambler. The location along the North Pennsylvania Railroad line was ideal for operations since raw asbestos could be easily brought in from Quebec and finished products sent out to markets. The close availability of magnesium carbonate from local dolomite mines was also an advantage of the factory location. The original K&M factory was built in 1883.

By World War I, the success of K&M led to Ambler being labeled as the "asbestos capital of the world". From 1897 to 1962, the site was contaminated by the waste disposal practices of K&M and subsequent owners.

The reservoir was used by K&M for process water for manufacturing operations. The reservoir first appeared on Sanborn maps in 1921.

As early as the 1930s, K&M disposed of out-of-specification asbestos-containing manufacturing materials and other solid waste in the park parcel. K&M also disposed of a slurry of spent magnesium and calcium used in manufacturing in the reservoir.

Keasbey and Mattison was purchased by Turner & Newall in 1934. The company was subsequently purchased by CertainTeed Corporation and Nicolet Industries in 1962 and the plant was divided between the two companies. CertainTeed continued the dumping of asbestos-containing material such as broken wallboard and asbestos pipe. Nicolet pumped asbestos-containing water into settling ponds which created wet asbestos piles that gradually dried.

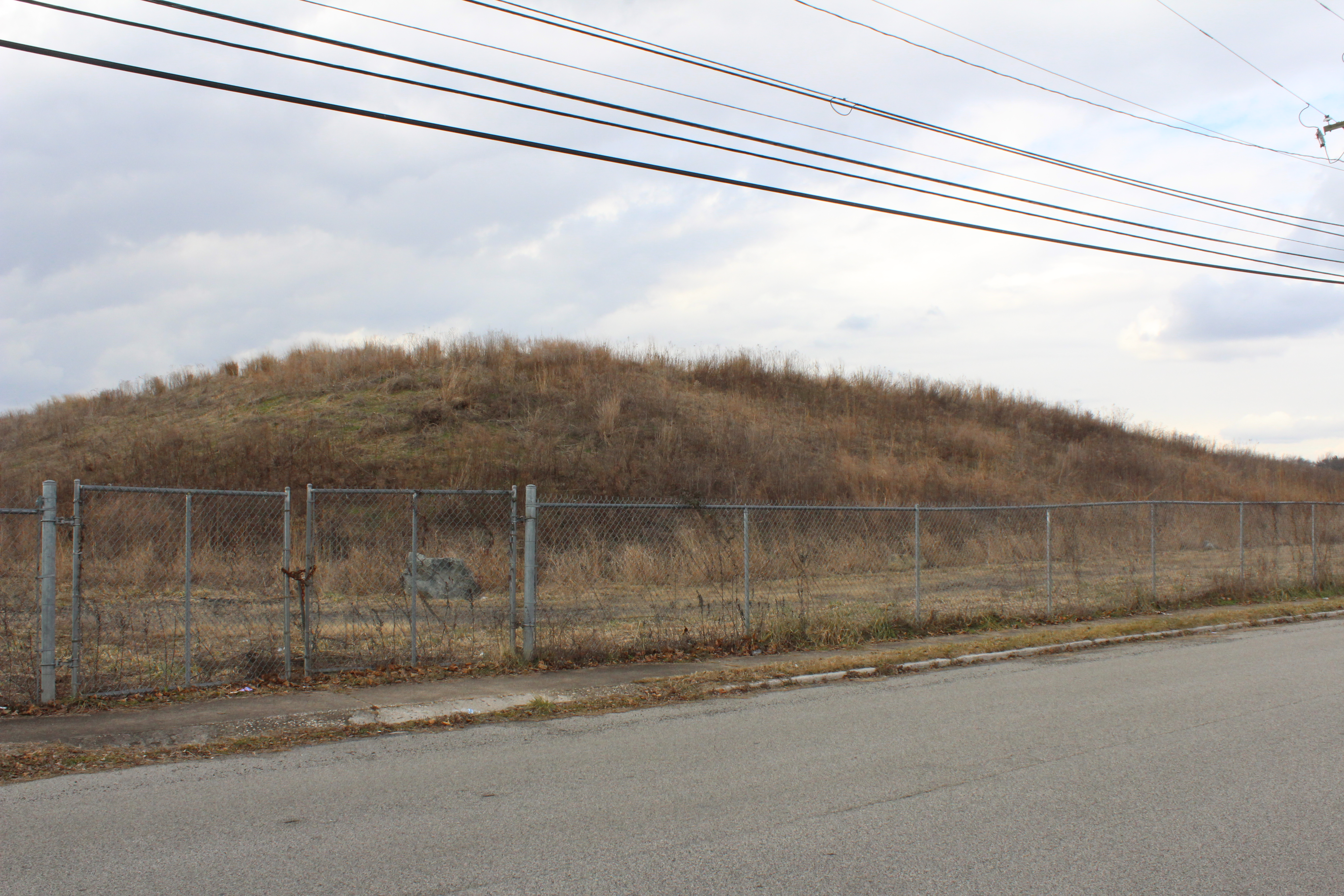
Covered asbestos pile in 2021

By 1962, the asbestos pile had grown to 20–30 feet (6.1–9.1 m) in height. It was known colloquially as the "White Mountains" by local residents. Children would play on the "mountains" and slide down them on cardboard. By 1965, vegetation had begun to grow on the pile. In 1983 and 1984, the EPA and Pennsylvania Department of Environmental Protection (PADEP) conducted sampling at the site and found that asbestos (primarily chrysotile) was the main contaminant at the site. The site was fenced in by 1986 but the EPA determined that the asbestos pile fell below the threshold level of risk to place it on the National Priorities List. At the time, surface water and groundwater contamination were not included in the risk assessment. The site was monitored by the PADEP and continued to be used during the 1980s and 1990s as a trash transfer and storage location as well as for local fire department training.

In 1971 and 1972, Nicolet and CertainTeed filed for permits with the State of Pennsylvania to continue operations at the site. The State denied the application and ordered the companies to stop dumping asbestos and cover the waste piles. CertainTeed signed a consent order and agreed to follow the State's order but Nicolet refused to comply.

In 1987, Nicolet Industries filed for bankruptcy and ceased production of asbestos-containing materials after being named in 50,000 cases of bodily injury caused by asbestos.

In 2005, housing developer Kane Core submitted plans for the construction of a 17-story high rise on the asbestos waste dump parcel. The plans were scrapped due to community concerns that construction would release asbestos dust into the air.

In 2006, the EPA conducted sampling and found asbestos in the air, soil and surface water at the site. Asbestos was visible in Wissahickon Creek, Tannery Run Creek, and Rose Valley Creek. The EPA re-evaluated the risk level and the site was placed on the National Priorities List on April 9, 2009.

The BoRit Asbestos Area Community Advisory Group (CAG) was established by the EPA and community members to represent the interests of the communities regarding the site.

A 2011 study by the Pennsylvania Department of Health reviewed data from 1992 to 2008, and reported that mesothelioma was diagnosed 3.1 times more often in Ambler residents than in other Pennsylvania residents. The study attributed the higher-than-average rates of mesothelioma to exposure to asbestos.

In 2014, the University of Pennsylvania received a $10 million grant from the National Institute of Environmental Health Sciences to study the impact of asbestos on the community of Ambler.

== Clean-up ==
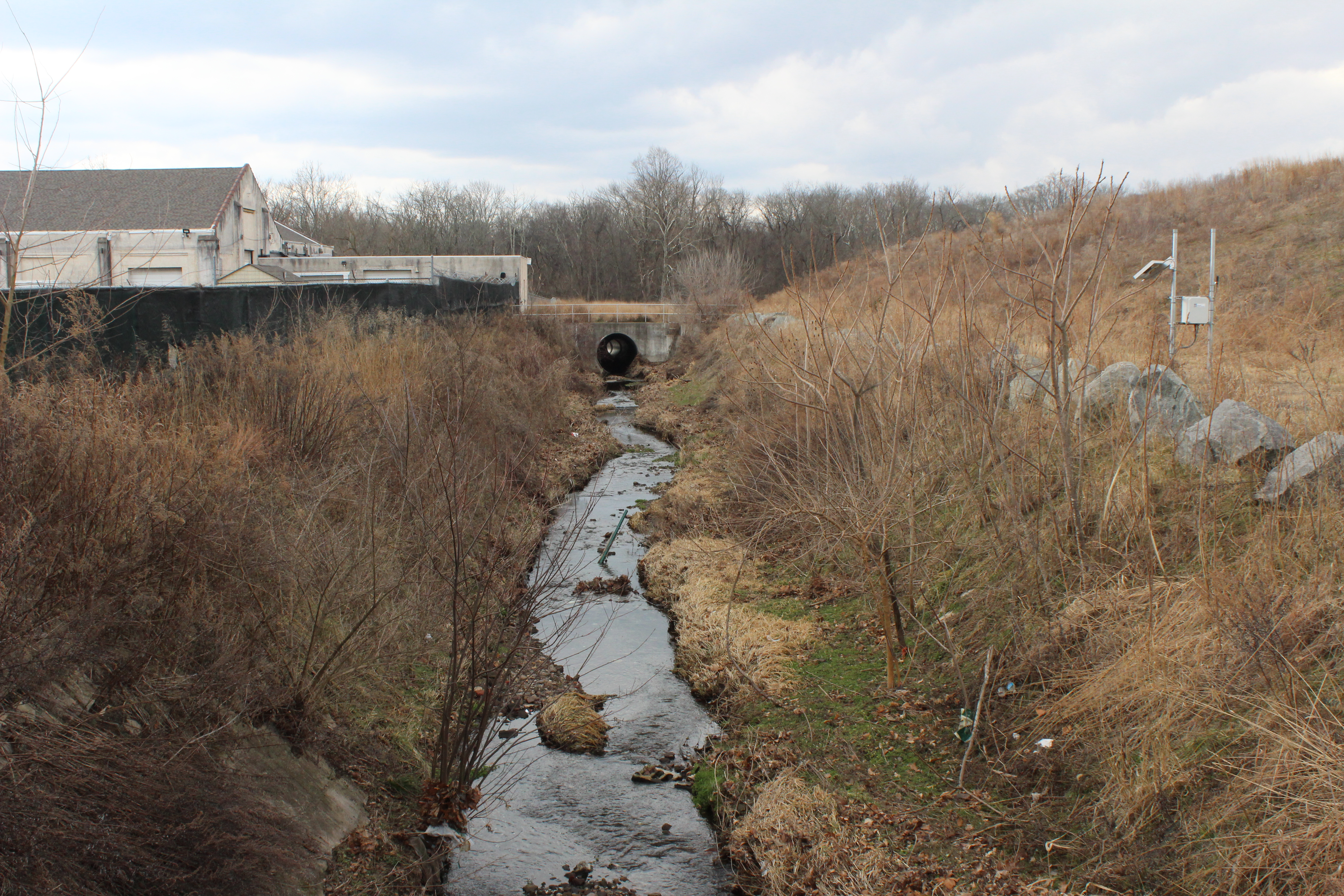
A portion of Tannery Run Creek near the covered asbestos pile was routed through a pipe to prevent erosion from creek flow.

In 1977, CertainTeed contained their asbestos pile with a vegetated cover. Nicolet Industries decontaminated the playground equipment in the park parcel and closed the playground in 1984.

The EPA issued a Record of Decision (ROD) in July 2017 which documented the remediation of the site which included covering the asbestos waste pile with a geotextile material and two feet of clean fill. Remediation work began in 2008 and the capping of the site was completed along with stream bank stabilization on the Wissahickon Creek, Tannery Run Creek and Rose Valley Creek. The stream bottoms were capped with mats and a polyethylene honeycomb filled with soil was anchored to the stream banks. A portion of Tannery Run Creek was routed through a pipe to prevent further soil erosion from the creek flow.

The EPA drained the reservoir and treated 37 million US gallons (140 Ml) of water. A geotextile membrane was placed at the bottom of the reservoir, covered with two feet of clean material and refilled with clean water. An island was built in the middle of the reservoir to provide an area free of predators for migratory birds. The approximate cost for remediation of the site was $26 million.

== Current status ==
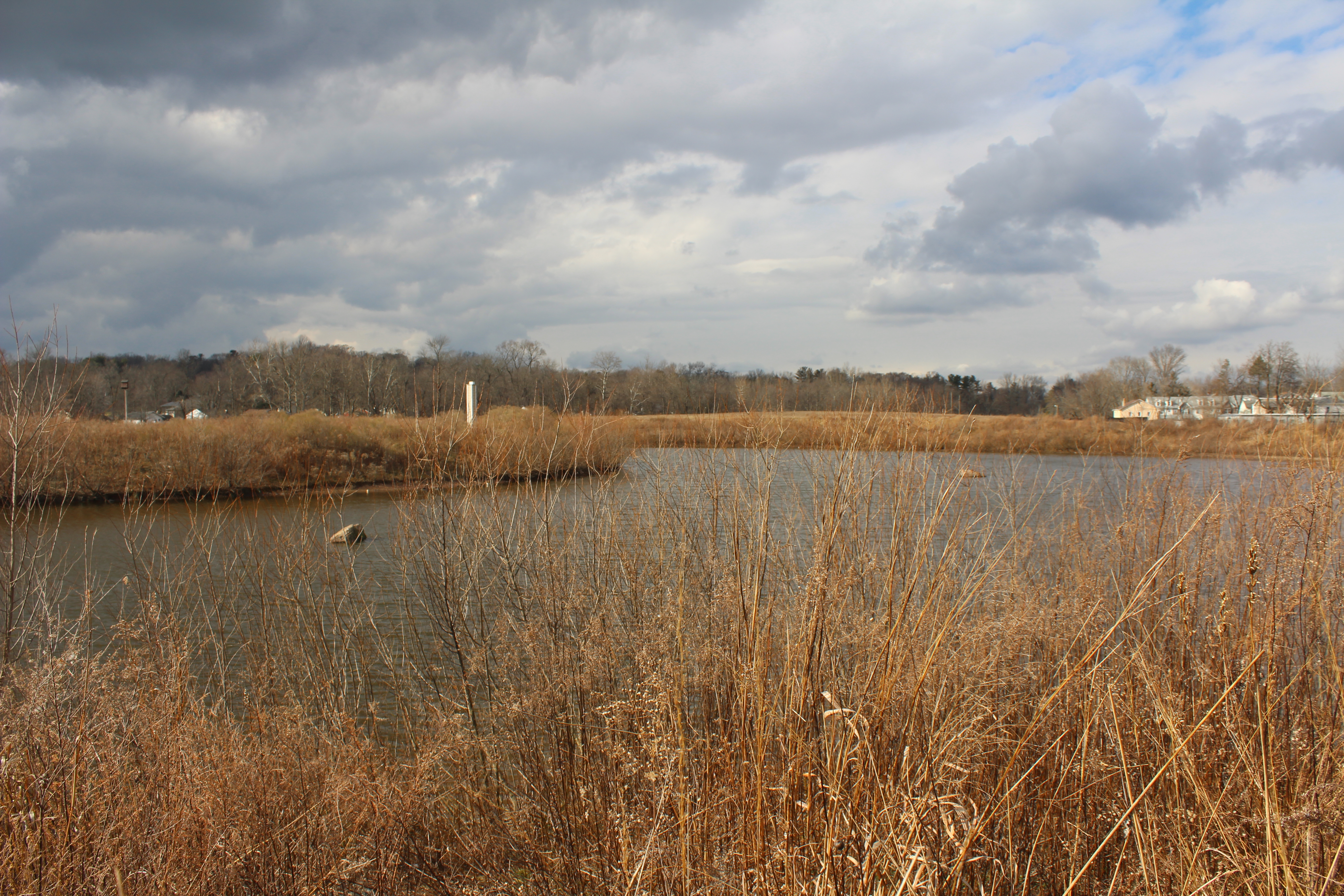
The reservoir parcel has been remediated and repurposed as the Wissahickon Waterfowl Preserve.

The reservoir parcel is currently being used as the Wissahickon Waterfowl Preserve.

The site is monitored on a quarterly basis and after significant weather events to ensure the integrity of the cap, vegetation, and stabilized stream bank areas. Annual monitoring will occur and a five-year review of the site is planned for completion in 2022.
