= Joe Nemechek =

American racing driver (born 1963)

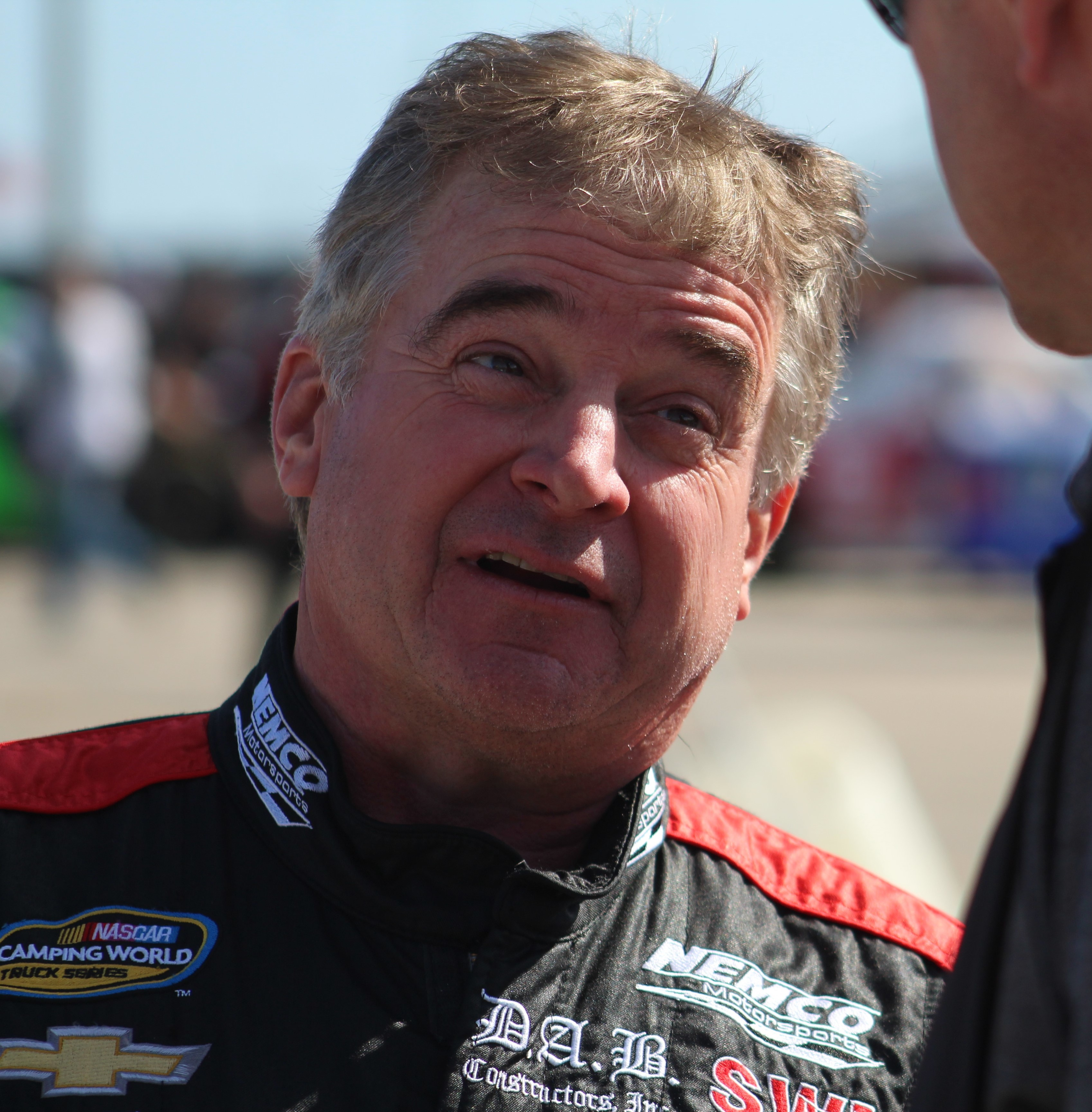
- Nemechek at Daytona International Speedway in 2019
- Born: Joseph Frank Nemechek III; September 26, 1963 (age 63); Lakeland, Florida, U.S.
- Achievements: 1989 All PRO Super Series Champion; 1992 NASCAR Busch Series Champion
- Awards: 1988 USAR Rookie of the Year; 1990 Busch Series Rookie of the Year; 1992, 1993 Busch Series Most Popular Driver

NASCAR Cup Series career
- 674 races run over 24 years
- 2019 position: 57th
- Best finish: 15th (2000)
- First race: 1993 Slick 50 300 (New Hampshire)
- Last race: 2019 Ford EcoBoost 400 (Homestead)
- First win: 1999 Dura Lube/Kmart 300 (New Hampshire)
- Last win: 2004 Banquet 400 (Kansas)
Wins	Top tens	Poles
4	62	10

NASCAR O'Reilly Auto Parts Series career
- 453 races run over 29 years
- 2020 position: 82nd
- Best finish: 1st (1992)
- First race: 1989 AC-Delco 500 (Rockingham)
- Last race: 2020 Ag-Pro 300 (Talladega)
- First win: 1992 Kroger 200 (IRP)
- Last win: 2004 Mr. Goodcents 300 (Kansas)
Wins	Top tens	Poles
16	126	18

NASCAR FedEx Freight Truck Series career
- 70 races run over 10 years
- 2021 position: 119th
- Best finish: 19th (2014)
- First race: 1996 Parts America 150 (Watkins Glen)
- Last race: 2020 Chevrolet Silverado 250 (Talladega)
Wins	Top tens	Poles
0	19	0
- Statistics up to date as of December 31, 2021.

Joseph Frank Nemechek III (born September 26, 1963) is an American professional stock car racing driver. The 1992 NASCAR Busch Series champion, he has the third most national series (Cup, Xfinity, Truck) starts in NASCAR history.

He is the older brother of racing driver John Nemechek. He is the father of John Hunter Nemechek, who competes full-time in the Cup Series for Legacy Motor Club. He is nicknamed "Front-Row Joe", which was coined by former teammate Wally Dallenbach for his tendency in the late 1990s to be a regular contender for a front-row starting position.

== Racing career ==
=== Early career and Busch Series ===
Nemechek began racing at the age of thirteen in motocross and won 300 career races over the next six years. After winning various awards in different short-track series around the country, Nemechek made his Busch Series debut at North Carolina Speedway in 1989, where he started 40th and finished 33rd after suffering an engine failure in his No. 88 Buick.

Nemechek moved up to the Busch Series in 1990, running the No. 87 with sponsorship from Master Machine & Tool, posting two top-fives and finishing 17th in points, winning Rookie of the Year honors. He had sixteen top-ten finishes and finished sixth in points the following year. In 1992, Nemechek got full-time sponsorship from Texas Pete sauce, and got his first two career wins and defeated Bobby Labonte for the championship by three points. He did not win again in 1993, but he won three poles and finished fifth in points. That season, he made his Winston Cup debut at New Hampshire International Speedway for his NEMCO team, starting fifteenth before finishing 36th after suffering rocker arm failure. After running two more races in the No. 87, he ran a pair of races for Morgan-McClure Motorsports, his best finish being a 23rd-place showing at Rockingham.

=== Early Cup career ===
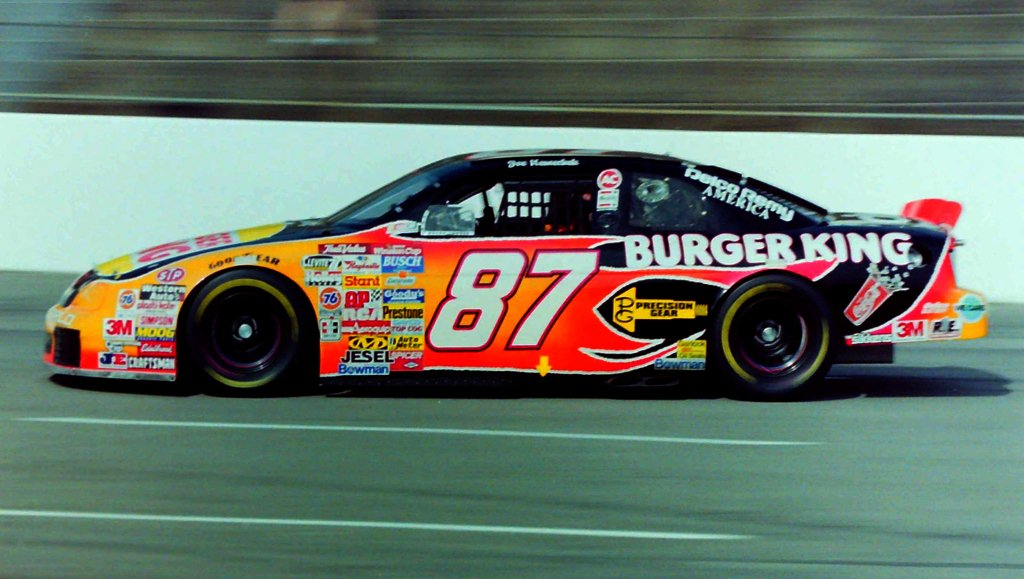
Nemechek's 1996 car

In 1994, Nemechek joined Larry Hedrick Motorsports to drive the No. 41 Meineke Discount Mufflers Chevy. Despite missing two races, he had three top-ten finishes and finished 27th in points. The next season, he moved his No. 87 team up to the Cup Series with sponsorship from Burger King, posted a fourth-place finish at the MBNA 500 and finished 28th in points. After he dropped to 34th in points, he abandoned his Cup Series team and signed to drive the No. 42 Bellsouth car for SABCO Racing. After losing his brother John in an accident at Homestead-Miami Speedway early in the year, Nemechek won the first two pole positions of his career, at California Speedway and Pocono Raceway, respectively. He posted four Top 10's and finished a career-best 26th in points the following year. Midway through 1999, he announced he would not return to the No. 42 team the following season when he picked up his first career victory at Loudon. He won two more poles at Martinsville and Talladega Superspeedway and finished 30th in points that year.

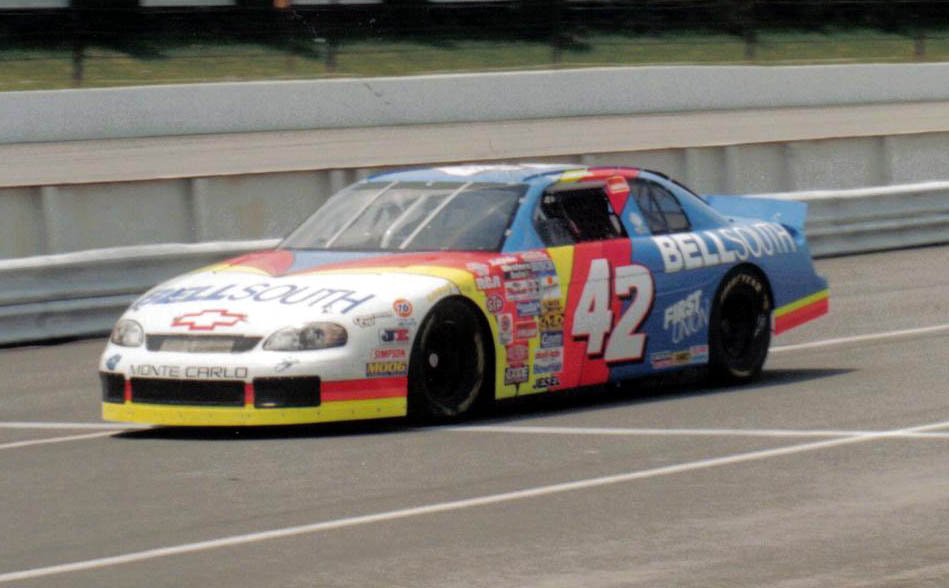
Nemechek's No. 42 BellSouth race car in 1997

=== Andy Petree Racing and Hendrick Motorsports ===
For 2000, Nemechek signed to drive the No. 33 Oakwood Homes Chevrolet for Andy Petree Racing, winning the pole at Talladega and finishing a career-best 15th in points. He missed five races the following year after suffering an elbow injury at a test at Dover in 2001, then went on to win the Pop Secret Microwave Popcorn 400 at North Carolina Speedway that November.

After Petree's team began to run into financial problems, Nemechek's team was left without a sponsor and he left for Haas-Carter Motorsports to take over the No. 26 Kmart Ford Taurus that Jimmy Spencer had left for Chip Ganassi Racing. However, Nemechek went from one financial problem to another, as Kmart filed for bankruptcy early in the 2002 season and stopped sponsoring the Haas-Carter team. This forced Haas-Carter to scale back its operations to one team, and Nemechek was released in favor of keeping Todd Bodine, who was driving the team's other car. Nemechek found an opportunity almost immediately, as Johnny Benson Jr., who was the driver of the No. 10 Valvoline Pontiac for MBV Motorsports, was injured in a crash the previous race and required a substitute. After driving one race in Benson's car at Richmond, Nemechek was hired by Hendrick Motorsports to replace Jerry Nadeau in the No. 25 UAW-Delphi Chevrolet. Nemechek drove the remainder of the season for Hendrick and performed well enough to earn that ride full time the next season, including second place runs at Atlanta and Homestead where in the latter of the two races mentioned, he led the most laps, he lost both races to Kurt Busch however.

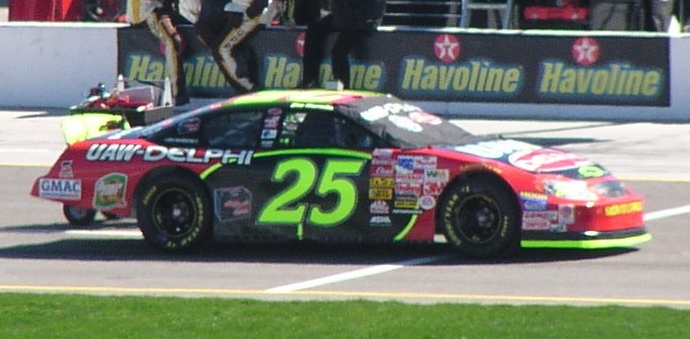
Nemechek in the No. 25 for Hendrick Motorsports in 2003 at Las Vegas

In 2003, Nemechek started in the second spot, led the most laps, and won the Pontiac Excitement 400. The race was rain-shortened with seven laps left, and just three minutes under a red flag, NASCAR called the race official. Nemechek, in an indoor victory lane, dedicated his win to Nadeau, who previously suffered a massive crash during a practice run at Richmond, which would end up ending Nadeau's career in motorsports. After the big win, Nemechek posted five other top-ten finishes but finished 25th in points. It wasn't enough for Nemechek to keep his job at Hendrick, and was announced to be released from his contract at the end of the season in favor of their Busch Series driver, Brian Vickers. The team later ended up releasing Nemechek early to prepare for Vickers' start in the No. 25 in 2004. Nemechek would move to his 2004 team, the No. 01 for MB2 Motorsports, early, as well.

=== MB2 Motorsports/Ginn Racing ===
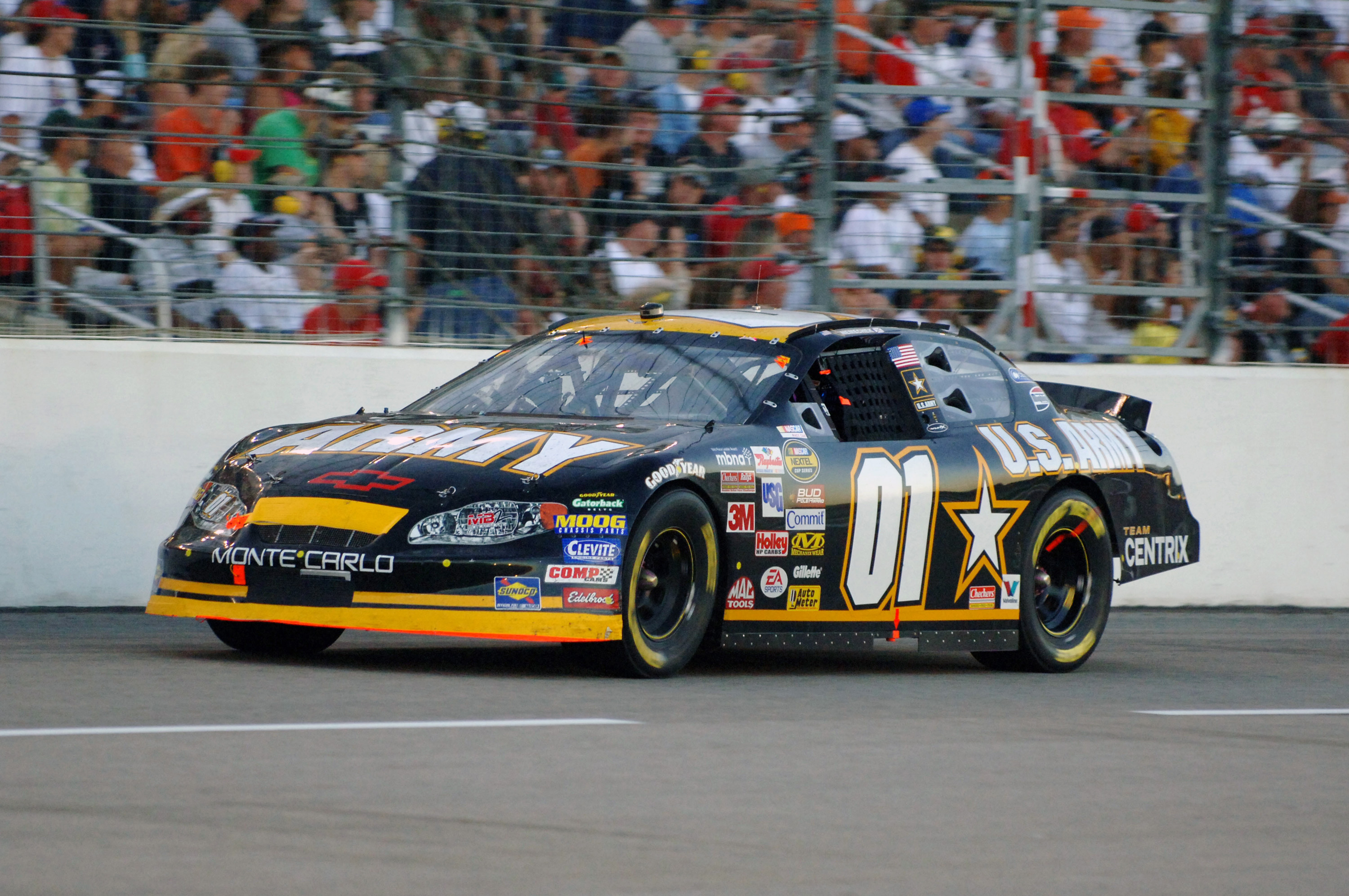
Nemechek in the No. 01 at Texas Motor Speedway in 2005

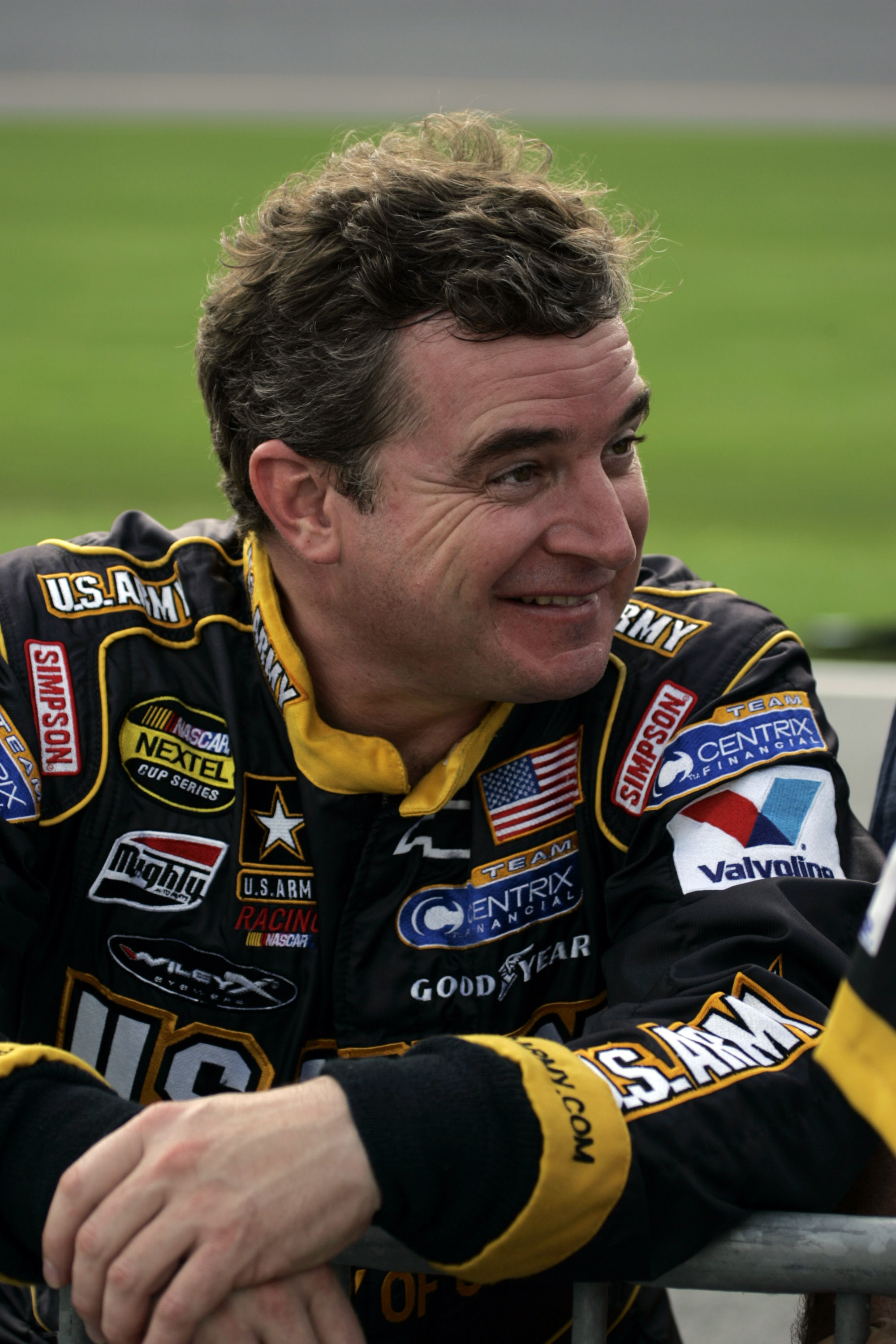
Nemechek in 2005

For the 2004 season, Nemechek returned to MB2 Motorsports, taking over the No. 01 U.S. Army car. He was again replacing Jerry Nadeau as the driver, although this time it was due to Nadeau suffering a severe injury that would eventually end his racing career. He won two poles late in the season. In October, Nemechek won at Kansas Speedway, beating out Ricky Rudd at the finish line. Nemechek also won the Busch Series race at Kansas the day before, making him the first driver to pull the Busch-Cup double win at the track. The victory by Nemechek and MB2 at Kansas was a very emotional victory and Nemechek would say in a post-race interview that it was the biggest win of his career.

In 2005, Nemechek won the pole at Michigan. The season was highlighted by a feud with Kevin Harvick. After Harvick caused a multi-car crash involving Nemechek during practice for the 2005 Daytona 500, Nemechek and Jimmie Johnson were outspoken about their displeasure with Harvick. Later, Nemechek got into a tussle with Harvick during The Nextel Challenge. Nemechek got turned into Harvick by Tony Stewart and, because of their Daytona feud, Harvick took Nemechek's role in the wreck personally, which ignited a heated post-race conversation that nearly came to blows. Nemechek remarked post-race that, "Kevin thinks he owns this world, and he ain't squat." NASCAR would issue no penalties to either drivers.

At the end of the season, Nemechek fell seven points short of matching his career-best points finish.

MB2 was rebranded as Ginn Racing following Bobby Ginn's purchase of the team in 2006. He moved to Ginn's No. 13 with a CertainTeed sponsorship after veteran Mark Martin and rookie Regan Smith were tapped to share the No. 01 car. In July 2007, Nemechek was released due to a lack of sponsorship for the No. 13, which was subsequently shut down.

=== E&M Motorsports and Furniture Row Racing ===
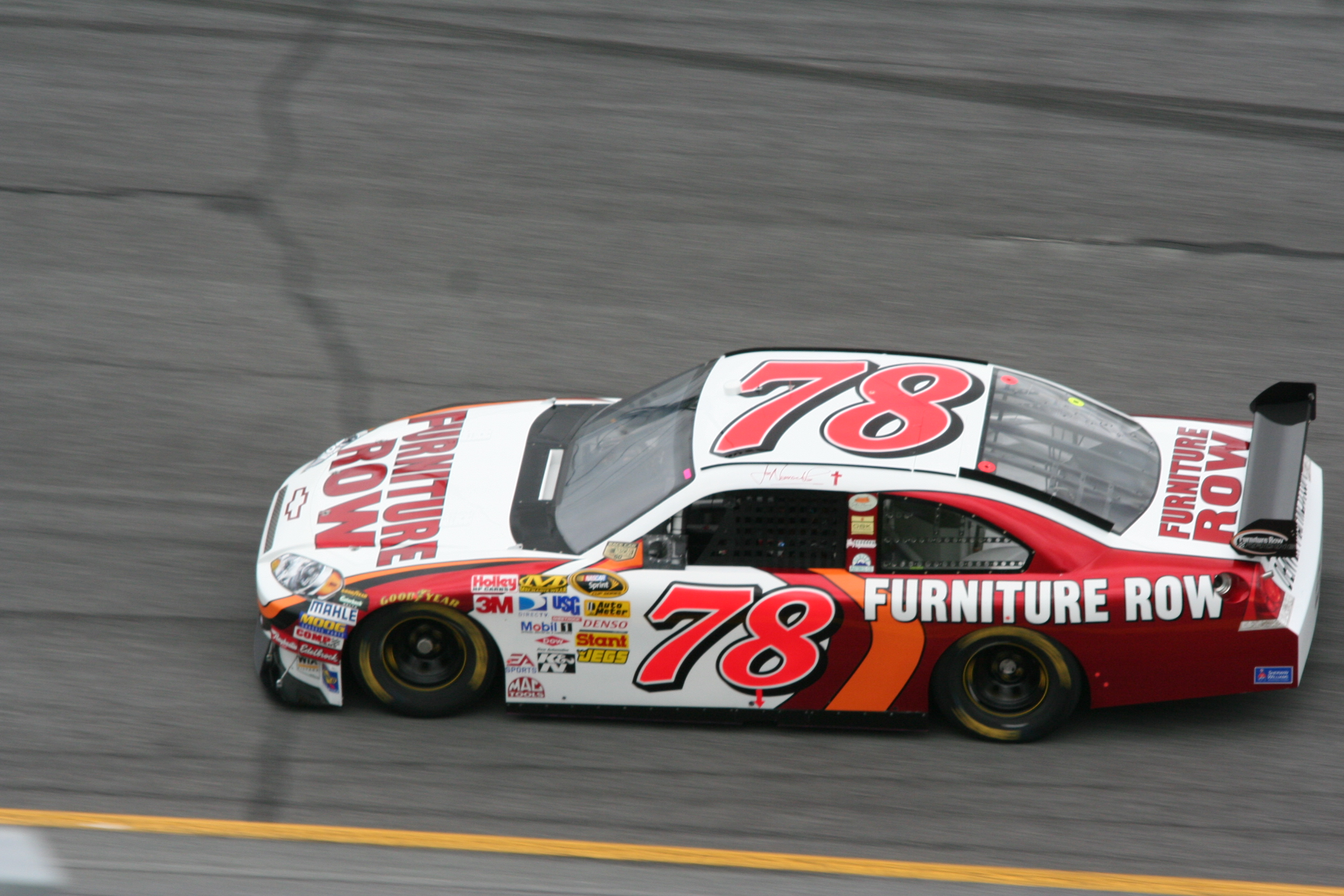
Nemechek in the No. 78 at the 2008 Daytona 500

He signed with E&M Motorsports, and although he failed his first attempt to qualify, at Indy, he made his way into the field for the Michigan race weekend driving the No. 08 Fans On Board Dodge. He spent the rest of the season driving for Furniture Row Racing, and signed a three-year contract with FRR to continue to drive in the No. 78 and help expand the team. In April 2008, at Talladega, Nemechek grabbed his tenth career pole driving the No. 78 National Day of Prayer/Furniture Row car. It marked Furniture Row Racing's first-ever pole. In October 2008, Nemechek finished 11th at the Talladega race. In November 2008, Furniture Row Racing announced that they were planning on running a limited schedule in 2009 or perhaps not at all in light of the economic situation. The day after this announcement Nemechek was released from his contract, and as a result, he was free to pursue other opportunities for 2009 and beyond.

=== Start and parking ===
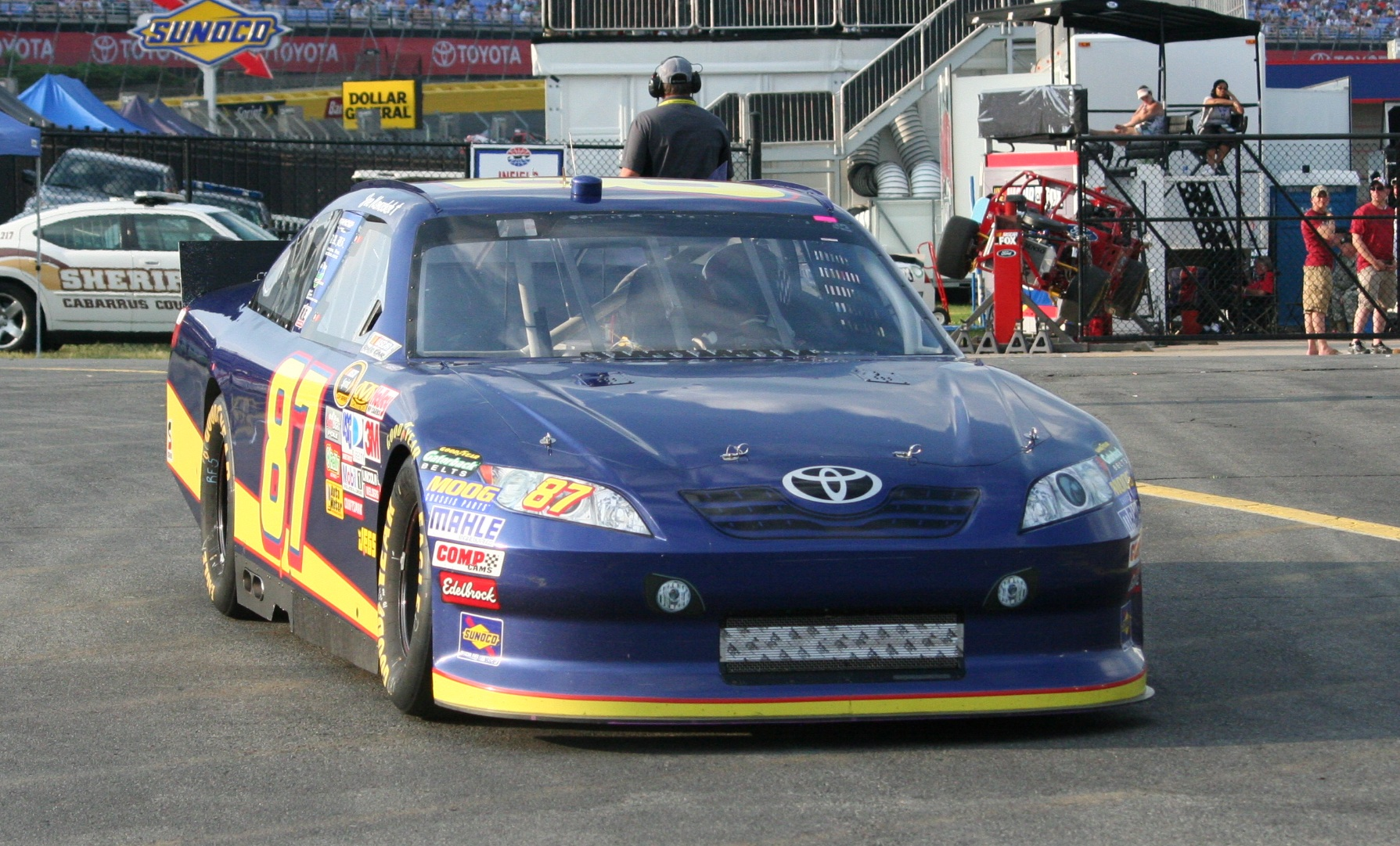
Nemechek in his No. 87 at the 2011 Coca-Cola 600

Shortly thereafter, Nemechek announced that he would be bringing his NEMCO Motorsports team back to full competition in both of NASCAR's top series, Sprint Cup and Nationwide. He would race the No. 87 Chevy in Nationwide and the No. 87 Camry in Cup. Nemechek ran most of the races for both series that season but occasionally had a younger fill in. In the Pepsi 300 at Nashville Superspeedway, Nemechek flipped after contact with several other cars. His car had minor damage, and he was able to drive it back to pit road.

Nemechek raced in 30 Cup races during the 2009 season despite very little funding. He finished just three events and did multiple "start and parks" where a driver starts the race, then parks to conserve parts, tires, etc. and to collect the prize money. On two occasions, he gave up his ride to Scott Speed after his fully funded team failed to qualify for Darlington and Sonoma. He qualified for the 2010 Daytona 500 after missing the race the year before. Nemechek picked up sponsorship from England Stove Works but was involved in an accident on lap 64. Nemechek would go on to compete in thirty more Cup races, with most being "start and parks." That season was highlighted by the 2010 AMP Energy Juice 500, Nemechek led the first lap after starting fourth. He would run the full distance, finishing 27th after suffering a blown tire.

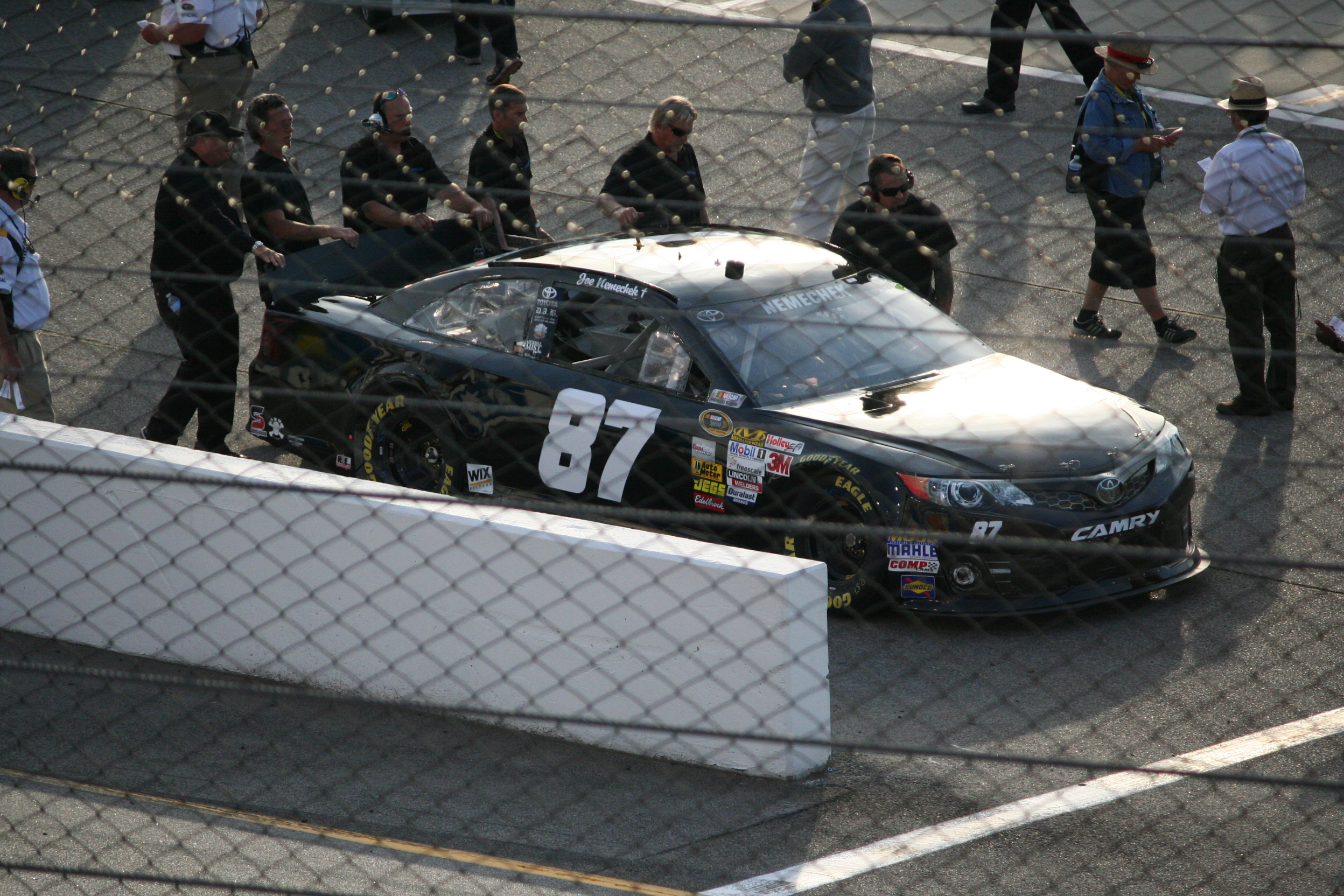
Nemechek in his No. 87 in 2013

Nemechek brought his No. 87 cars back for 2011 to once again run both major NASCAR series. Nemechek successfully qualified for the Daytona 500 for the second year in a row but was once again involved in an early incident, thus failing to finish again. On June 9 at Texas Motor Speedway, along with Jeff Burton he made his 900th NASCAR start in all top three series. In the Nationwide Series, Nemechek scored his first top-five since 2005 with a third-place finish at the Aaron's 312 after being in the position to win with two laps to go. In July, Nemechek picked up sponsorship from Extenze and AM FM Energy to run the full race in both series at Daytona International Speedway. He led laps in both races but was taken out in late accidents. Nemechek collected Nationwide Series points for 2011 under NASCAR's policy that a driver may accumulate points for only one series, and finished 14th in the final standings. He ran the No. 87 in both the Sprint Cup and Nationwide Series in 2012, with the Cup ride as a start-and-park to fund the Nationwide team. Nemechek made his 600th career start at Michigan and finished 40th after starting 37th. Nemechek finished 11th in the 2012 Nationwide Series points.

=== 2014 ===
Nemechek's team became Identity Ventures Racing in 2014, and he drove several races in the No. 66 car, which had a limited partnership with Michael Waltrip Racing.

In April 2014, Nemechek announced that he would be driving the No. 86 Deware Racing Group Chevrolet Camaro with sponsorship from Bubba Burger. In the 2014 Aaron's 312, Nemechek was running towards the front during the entire race. With three laps remaining, Nemechek was running in the top-ten and finished sixth, his 126th top-ten in the Nationwide Series. For the Coke Zero 400, Nemechek entered with the No. 29 RAB Racing Toyota with sponsorship from ToyotaCare, but failed to qualify. Nemechek joined Randy Humphrey Racing for the Oral-B USA 500, qualifying 34th and finishing 37th. He returned to RAB Racing's No. 29 at the 2014 GEICO 500, and initially qualified 24th, putting him in the field for the race. However, his car failed post-race inspection for an improperly sealed oil tank encasement, and he failed to qualify. This became the first season in Nemechek's Cup Series career where he did not race in any of the superspeedway races.

=== 2015–2018 ===
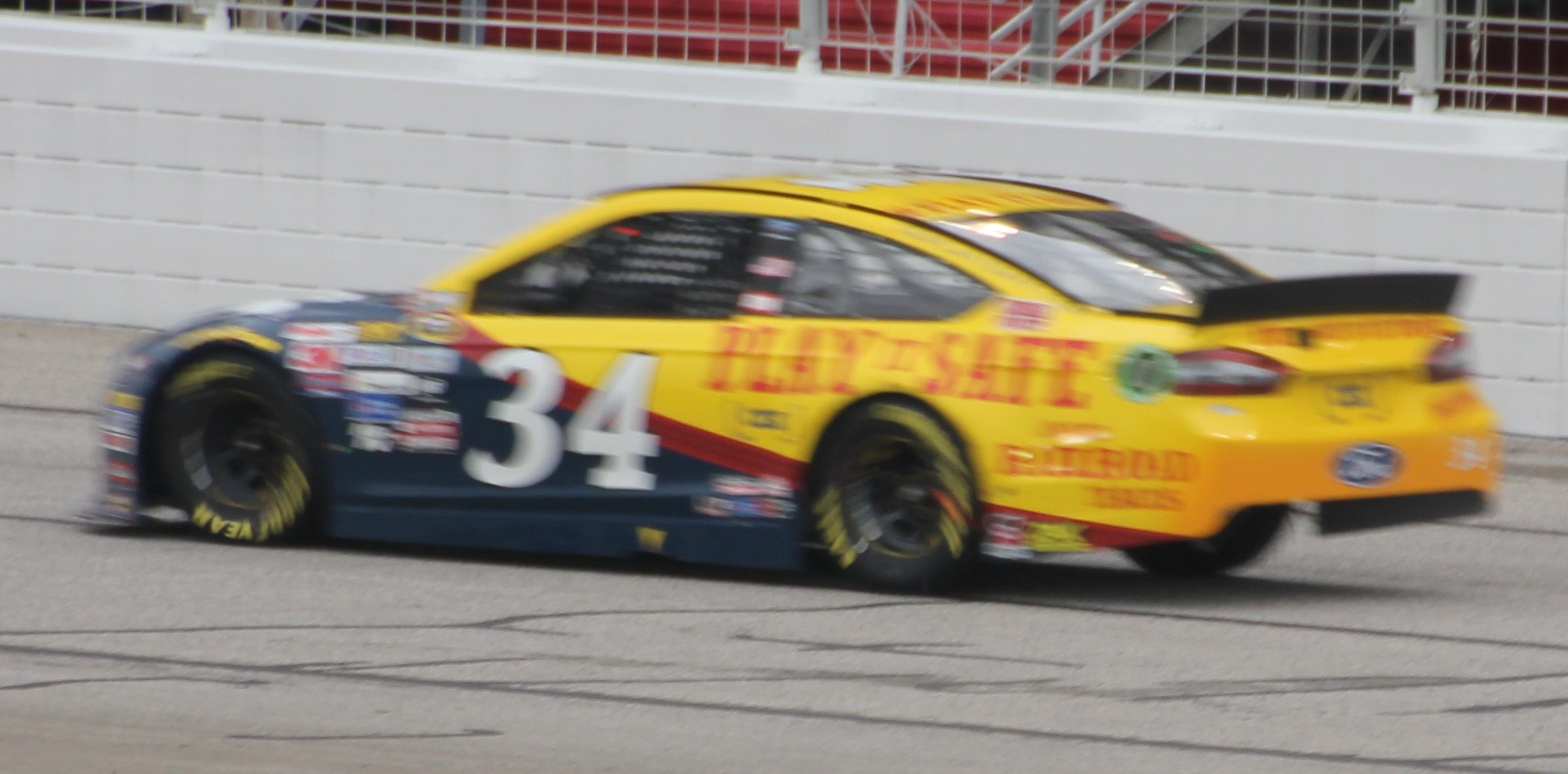
Nemechek's No. 34 car at Atlanta Motor Speedway in 2015

Nemechek's team announced that for the 2015 NASCAR Camping World Truck Series season that his team would be returning to Chevrolet after a three-year tenure with Toyota. Nemechek returned to his own team in the Xfinity and Cup series, running a limited schedule with Chevrolets. Nemechek began the season by failing to qualify for the Xfinity race at Daytona, and withdrawing from the Daytona 500.

The following week at Atlanta, he was announced as the substitute for David Ragan in the No. 34 CSX Ford for Front Row Motorsports. At the time, Ragan was driving for Joe Gibbs Racing in place of the injured Kyle Busch. Nemechek drove the No. 34 car to a 33rd-place finish in what would be his only Cup Series start of the season.

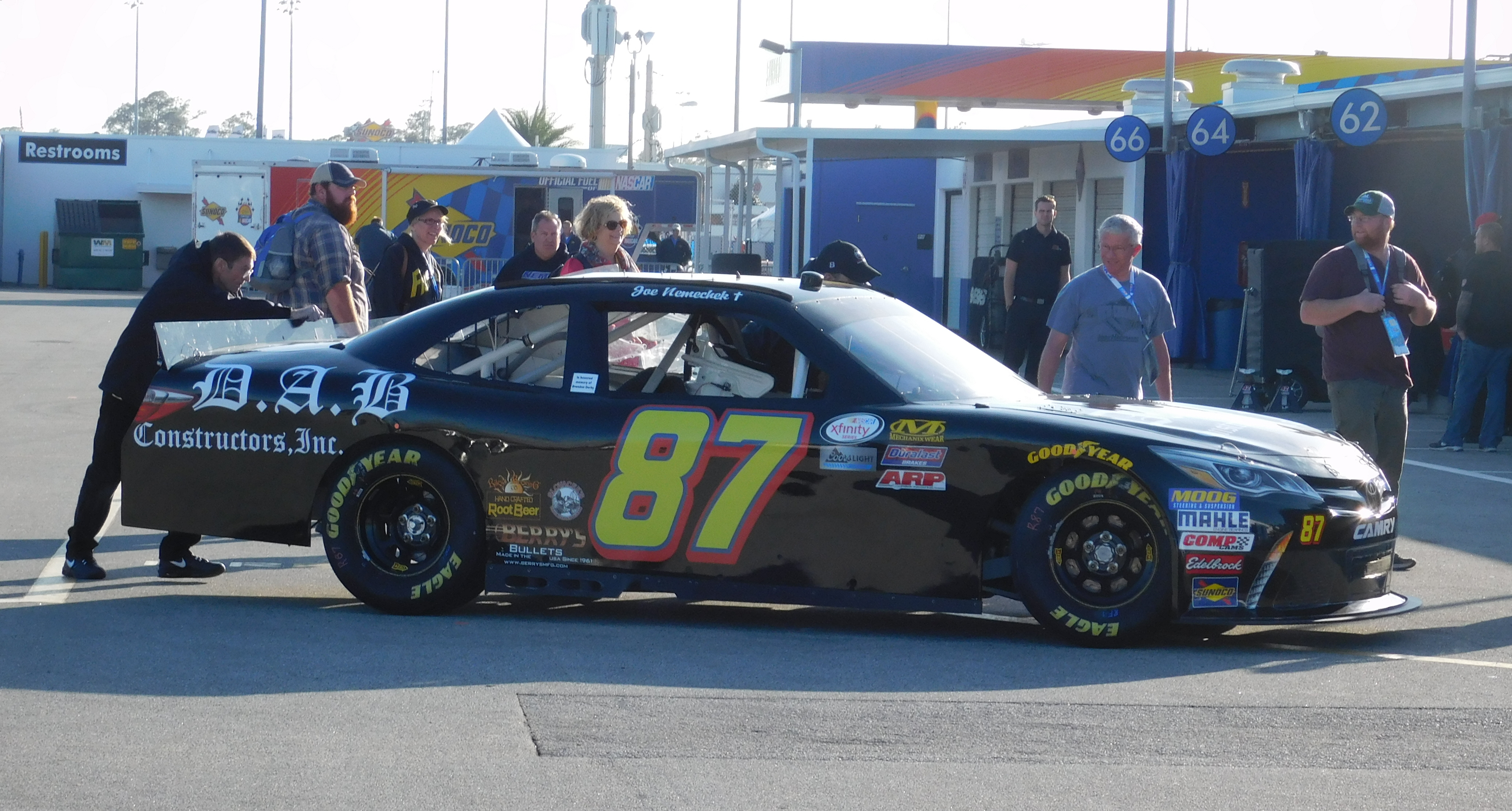
Nemechek's Xfinity Series car in the garage area at Daytona in February 2016

Nemechek made two appearances in 2016, driving his own No. 87 in both Xfinity races at Daytona. Nemechek finished 18th in February and 36th in July after being caught in an early crash while he was running in the Top 10.

On January 20, 2017, it was announced that Nemechek would drive the No. 87 truck in the first three races of the season. Nemechek would finish 5th in the season opening race. The next week he would finish 24th at Atlanta. Beginning at Gateway after a four race break, Nemechek start and parked the No. 87 until the end of the season, skipping only Eldora and Martinsville where he gave up the ride for Ty Dillon, who brought sponsorship to run the full race. Nemechek's son, John Hunter, would win two consecutive Truck Series races at Gateway and Iowa. Nemechek returned to Xfinity Series and drove the final two races of the season for JD Motorsports, beginning with a start and park at Phoenix in the No. 15 and a full race at Homestead in the No. 01 (ironically his old number in the Cup Series from 2003 to 2006), where he would finished tenth in Stage 1.

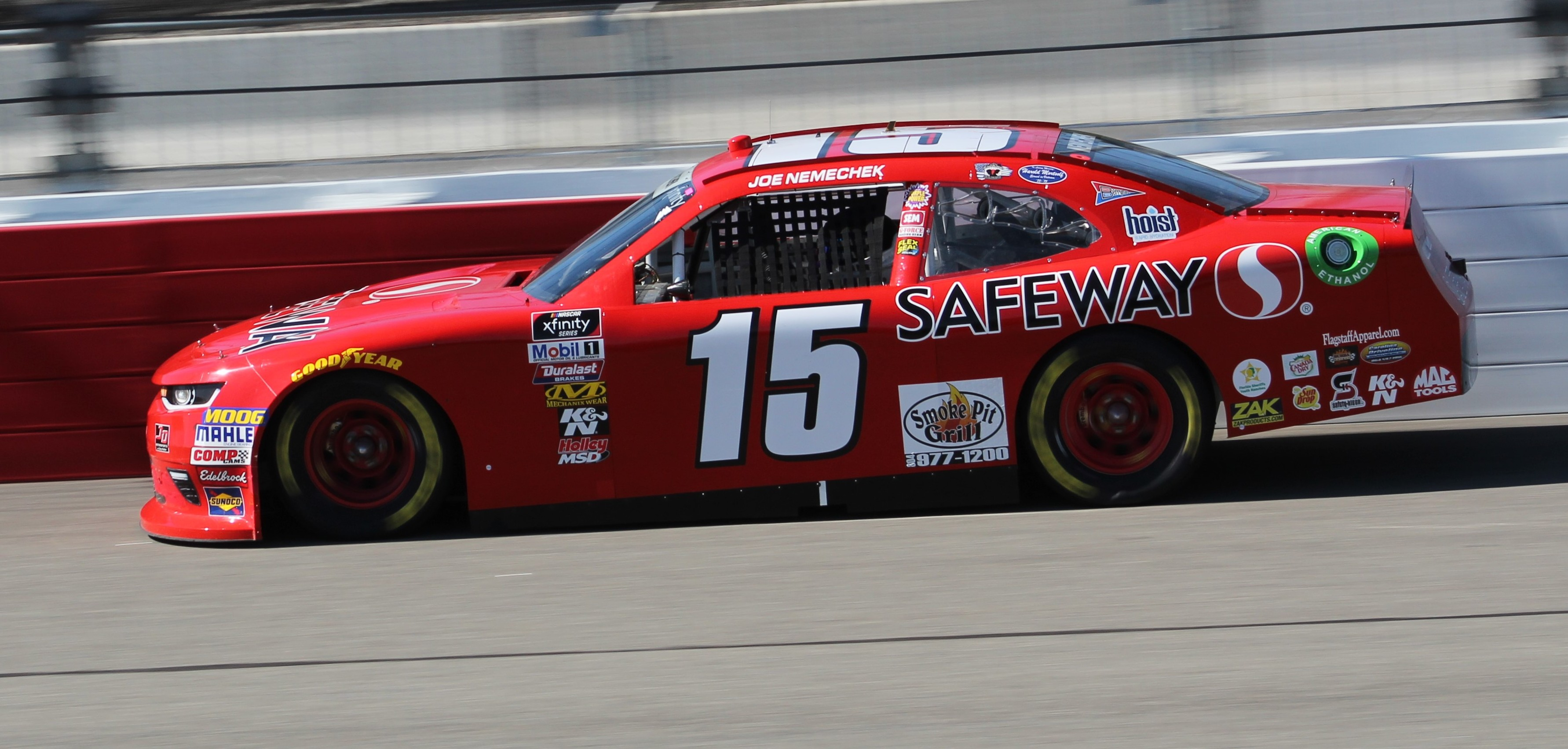
Nemechek driving in the Xfinity Series in the JD Motorsports No. 15 at Richmond in April 2018

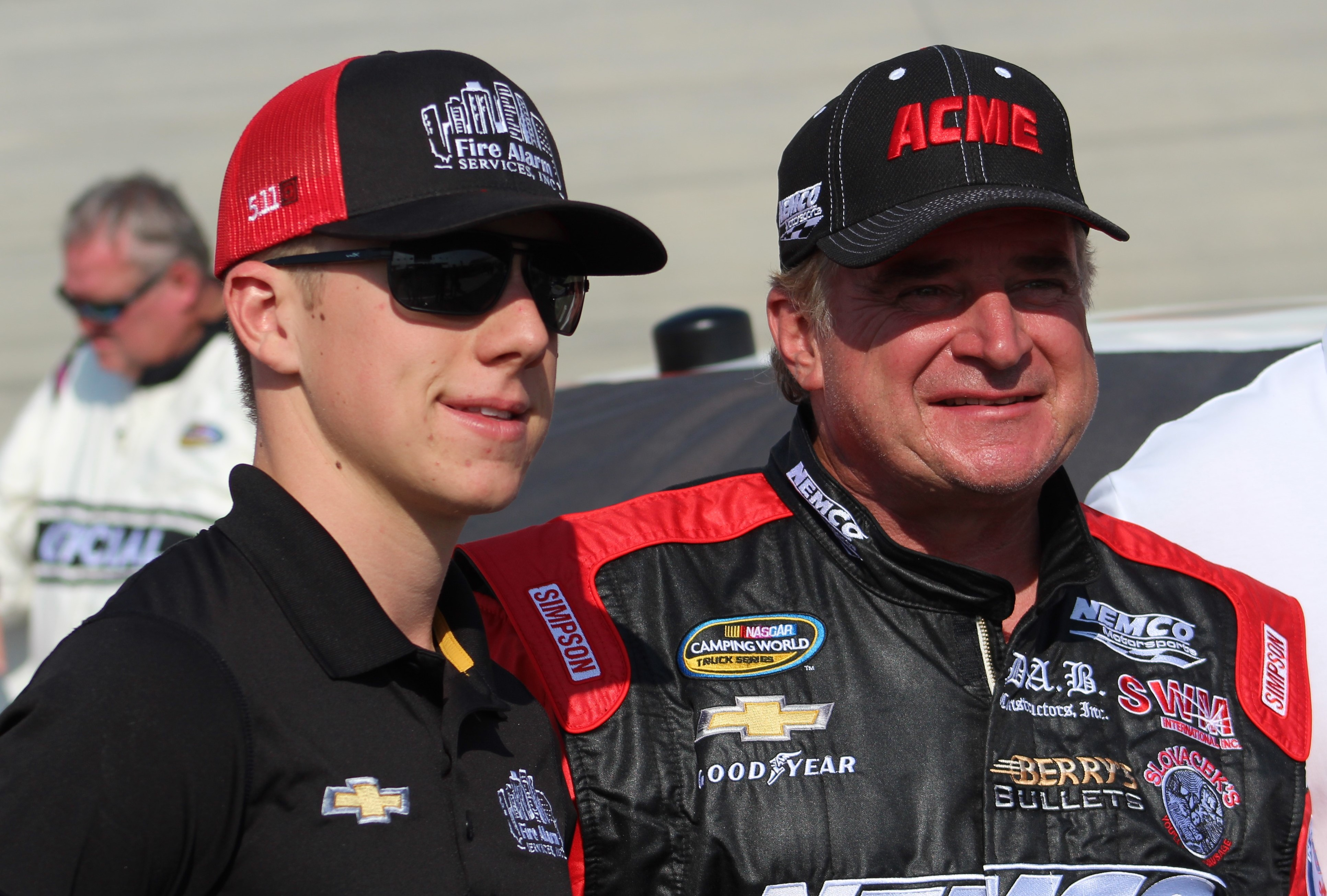
Joe and his son John Hunter Nemechek at Dover in May 2018

In 2018, Nemechek took over as a driver at NEMCO Motorsports after his son John Hunter moved up to the Xfinity Series with Chip Ganassi Racing. He had also been announced as one of the drivers of JD Motorsports' No. 15 car, splitting the ride with other drivers. It was announced that Matt Mills would drive the No. 15 full time. Nemechek ran the PowerShares QQQ 300 in the 15, and later returned to the car for the Fitzgerald Glider Kits 300.

=== 2019–2022 ===
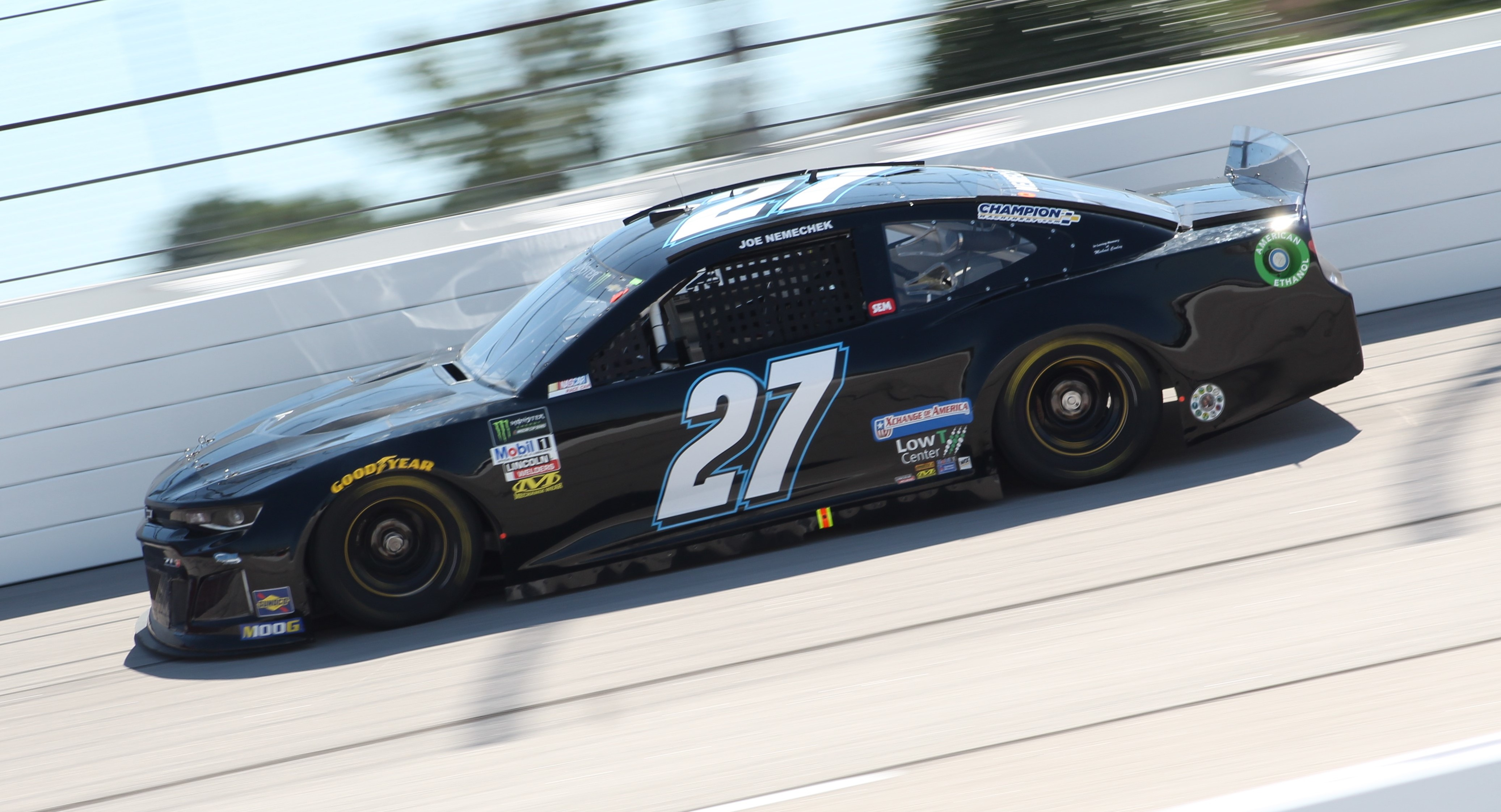
Nemechek at Darlington in 2019, which was his first Cup Series start since 2015

Nemechek would once again run primarily in the Truck Series for 2019, splitting time between the No. 8 and 87, sharing the trucks with multiple drivers. Nemechek also returned to Xfinity competition, driving the No. 13 for MBM Motorsports, and the No. 17 for Mike Harmon Racing. In September, Nemechek raced in the Monster Energy Cup Series for the first time since 2015, returning to Premium Motorsports (formerly Identity Ventures) in their No. 27 car for the Bojangles' Southern 500 as part of the annual throwback weekend. Nemechek later drove at Las Vegas Motor Speedway for the team in September and said that more races in 2019 or 2020 weren't out of the question. Nemechek and his son John Hunter made motorsports history at ISM Raceway in early November 2019 by being the first father-son duo to race in all three main series in one weekend. On November 15, 2019, Nemechek surpassed Richard Petty as the driver with the most starts in NASCAR's three national series, at 1,186. The record stood until Kevin Harvick surpassed him in 2021.

In 2020, Nemechek returned to Mike Harmon Racing in the Xfinity Series, driving their renumbered No. 47 car for the season opener at Daytona as well as at Las Vegas and Phoenix. Nemechek was scheduled to drive a third part-time car for Mike Harmon in 2021, but NASCAR's lack of regular qualifying halted those plans. Nemechek attempted the Truck Series opener at Daytona, but lacked speed and missed the field for the second year in a row.

In 2022, Nemechek returned to the Xfinity Series, driving the No. 24 for Sam Hunt Racing, partnering with his son John Hunter, at the Wawa 250. However, he failed to qualify for the race after rain cancelled qualifying.

=== Historic racing ===
Nemechek began competing in historic motorsport events in 2021 with his old NASCAR cars, making his debut in Historic Sportscar Racing's Classic Sebring 12 Hour. From 2022 to 2024, he won the Gene Felton Memorial at Road Atlanta; the first win was the inaugural running.

In 2024, Nemechek won the first race weekend for the HSR NASCAR Classic division at Virginia International Raceway.

== Motorsports career results ==
=== NASCAR ===
(key) (Bold – Pole position awarded by qualifying time. Italics – Pole position earned by points standings or practice time. * – Most laps led.)

==== Cup Series ====
NASCAR Cup Series results
Year	Team	No.	Make	1	2	3	4	5	6	7	8	9	10	11	12	13	14	15	16	17	18	19	20	21	22	23	24	25	26	27	28	29	30	31	32	33	34	35	36	MENCC	Pts	Ref
1993	NEMCO Motorsports	87	Chevy	DAY	CAR	RCH	ATL	DAR	BRI	NWS	MAR	TAL	SON	CLT	DOV	POC	MCH	DAY	NHA; 36	POC	TAL	GLN; 21	MCH; 37	BRI	DAR	RCH	DOV	MAR	NWS											44th	389	
1993	Morgan–McClure Motorsports	4	Chevy																											CLT; 25	CAR; 23	PHO	ATL							44th	389	
1994	Larry Hedrick Motorsports	41	Chevy	DAY; DNQ	CAR; 36	RCH; 21	ATL; 18	DAR; 19	BRI; 16	NWS; DNQ	MAR; 22	TAL; 42	SON; 22	CLT; 33	DOV; 14	POC; 32	MCH; 7	DAY; 39	NHA; 19	POC; 3	TAL; 35	IND; 20	GLN; 8	MCH; 21	BRI; 29	DAR; 42	RCH; 28	DOV; 36	MAR; 22	NWS; 34	CLT; 11	CAR; 17	PHO; 25	ATL; 23						27th	2673	
1995	NEMCO Motorsports	87	Chevy	DAY; 42	CAR; 29	RCH; 32	ATL; 16	DAR; 33	BRI; DNQ	NWS; 20	MAR; 14	TAL; DNQ	SON; 37	CLT; 20	DOV; 10	POC; 12	MCH; 28	DAY; 38	NHA; 19	POC; 9	TAL; 23	IND; 27	GLN; 31	MCH; 32	BRI; 16	DAR; 25	RCH; 26	DOV; 4	MAR; 30	NWS; 32	CLT; 22	CAR; 9	PHO; 18	ATL; 14						28th	2742	
1996	NEMCO Motorsports	87	Chevy	DAY; 39	CAR; 9	RCH; 34	ATL; 17	DAR; 31	BRI; 31	NWS; 36	MAR; 26	TAL; 13	SON; 41	CLT; 25	DOV; 25	POC; 21	MCH; 36	DAY; 18	NHA; 35	POC; 34	TAL; 15	IND; 27	GLN; 8	MCH; 27	BRI; 34	DAR; DNQ	RCH; 39	DOV; 25	MAR; 27	NWS; 26	CLT; DNQ	CAR; 24	PHO; 25	ATL; 34						34th	2391	
1997	Barkdoll Racing	73	Chevy	DAY; 27																																				28th	2754	
1997	Team SABCO	42	Chevy	DAY; DNQ	CAR; 35	RCH; 39	ATL; 39	DAR	TEX; 29	BRI; 19	MAR; 19	SON; DNQ	TAL; DNQ	CLT; 19	DOV; 15	POC; 36	MCH; 41	**CAL**; 18	DAY; 24	NHA; 40	**POC**; 21	IND; 32	GLN; 12	MCH; 27	BRI; 38	DAR; 23	RCH; 6	NHA; 13	DOV; 20	MAR; 25	CLT; 16	TAL; 31	CAR; 10	PHO; 24	ATL; 8					28th	2754	
1997	Team SABCO	40	Chevy										TAL; 19																											28th	2754	
1998	Team SABCO	42	Chevy	DAY; 26	CAR; 39	LVS; 37	ATL; 35	DAR; 37	BRI; DNQ	TEX; 4	MAR; 24	TAL; 32	CAL; 22	CLT; 6	DOV; 26	RCH; 12	MCH; 9	POC; 35	SON; 25	NHA; 36	POC; 17	IND; 24	GLN; 12	MCH; 12	BRI; 31	NHA; 18	DAR; 35	RCH; 37	DOV; 29	MAR; 40	CLT; 7	TAL; 29	DAY; 17	PHO; 18	CAR; 17	ATL; 40				26th	2897	
1999	Team SABCO	42	Chevy	DAY; 36	CAR; 24	LVS; 35	ATL; 14	DAR; 19	TEX; 33	BRI; 36	MAR; 37	TAL; 34	CAL; 40	RCH; 6	CLT; 32	DOV; 25	MCH; 34	POC; 42	SON; 19	**DAY**; 16	NHA; 37	POC; 29	IND; 22	GLN; 30	MCH; 22	BRI; 19	DAR; 6	RCH; 20	NHA; 1	DOV; 35	**MAR**; 38	CLT; 13	**TAL**; 30	CAR; 26	PHO; 19	HOM; 21	ATL; 32			30th	2956	
2000	Andy Petree Racing	33	Chevy	DAY; 42	CAR; 30	LVS; 9	ATL; 5	DAR; 41	BRI; 25	TEX; 37	MAR; 17	TAL; 22	CAL; 20	RCH; 23	CLT; 23	DOV; 7	MCH; 18	POC; 42	SON; 11	DAY; 11	NHA; 2	POC; 34	IND; 18	GLN; 8	MCH; 23	BRI; 27	DAR; 31	RCH; 40	NHA; 9	DOV; 7	MAR; 14	CLT; 14	**TAL**; 3	CAR; 10	PHO; 24	HOM; 18	ATL; 25			15th	3534	
2001	Andy Petree Racing	33	Chevy	DAY; 11	CAR; 17	LVS; 35	ATL; 17	DAR; 24	BRI; 43	TEX; 41	MAR; 16	TAL; 6	CAL; 20	RCH; 19	CLT	DOV	MCH	POC	SON	DAY; 27	CHI; 16	NHA; 41	POC; 23	IND; 20	GLN; 32	MCH; 22	BRI; 24	DAR; 33	RCH; 16	DOV; 7	KAN; 20	CLT; 20	MAR; 23	TAL; 8	PHO; 35	CAR; 1*	HOM; 31	ATL; 39	NHA; 20	28th	2994	
2002	Haas-Carter Motorsports	26	Ford	DAY; 40	CAR; 33	LVS; 19	ATL; 25	DAR; 17	BRI; 43	TEX	MAR	TAL	CAL; 25																											34th	2682	
2002	MBV Motorsports	10	Pontiac											RCH; 12																										34th	2682	
2002	Hendrick Motorsports	25	Chevy												CLT; 30	DOV; 43	POC; 41	MCH; 29	SON; 18	DAY; 36	CHI; 33	NHA; 41	POC; 24	IND; 20	GLN; 38	MCH; 35	BRI; 27	DAR; 21	RCH; 25	NHA; 32	DOV; 23	KAN; 4	TAL; 39	CLT; 40	MAR; 41	ATL; 2	CAR; 28	PHO; 33	HOM; 2*	34th	2682	
2003	Hendrick Motorsports	25	Chevy	DAY; 22	CAR; 23	LVS; 9	ATL; 9	DAR; 13	BRI; 27	TEX; 35	TAL; 21	MAR; 15	CAL; 32	RCH; 1*	CLT; 11	DOV; 24	POC; 38	MCH; 21	SON; 35	DAY; 38	CHI; 42	NHA; 29	POC; 7	IND; 37	GLN; 17	MCH; 20	BRI; 19	DAR; 21	RCH; 26	NHA; 3	DOV; 43	TAL; 25	KAN; 37	CLT; 31	MAR; 20					25th	3426	
2003	MB2 Motorsports	01	Pontiac																																	ATL; 10	PHO; 31	CAR; 25	HOM; 17	25th	3426	
2004	MB2 Motorsports	01	Chevy	DAY; 6	CAR; 24	LVS; 19	ATL; 15	DAR; 20	BRI; 27	TEX; 14	MAR; 27	TAL; 32	CAL; 28	RCH; 36	CLT; 14	DOV; 38	POC; 18	MCH; 35	SON; 29	DAY; 10	CHI; 8	NHA; 20	POC; 16	IND; 17	GLN; 22	MCH; 13	BRI; 42	CAL; 12	RCH; 22	NHA; 6	DOV; 35	**TAL**; 7	**KAN**; 1	CLT; 5	MAR; 30	ATL; 4	PHO; 12	DAR; 8	HOM; 27	19th	3878	
2005	MB2 Motorsports	01	Chevy	DAY; 13	CAL; 39*	LVS; 19	ATL; 35	BRI; 33	MAR; 10	TEX; 17	PHO; 10	TAL; 31	DAR; 11	RCH; 18	CLT; 18	DOV; 27	POC; 3	MCH; 6	SON; 23	DAY; 15	CHI; 15	NHA; 18	POC; 22	IND; 28	GLN; 9	**MCH**; 8	BRI; 12	CAL; 10	RCH; 26	NHA; 25	DOV; 17	TAL; 9	KAN; 20	CLT; 4	MAR; 23	ATL; 18	TEX; 37	PHO; 17	HOM; 24	16th	3953	
2006	MB2 Motorsports	01	Chevy	DAY; 33	CAL; 27	LVS; 13	ATL; 17	BRI; 28	MAR; 23	TEX; 23	PHO; 35	TAL; 27	RCH; 28	DAR; 16	CLT; 18	DOV; 35	POC; 29	MCH; 26	SON; 25	DAY; 19	CHI; 33	NHA; 41	POC; 17																	27th	3255	
2006	Ginn Racing	01	Chevy																					IND; 24	GLN; 42	MCH; 26	BRI; 26	CAL; 25	RCH; 32	NHA; 32	DOV; 26	KAN; 27	TAL; 18	CLT; 9	MAR; 20	ATL; 9	TEX; 18	PHO; 19	HOM; 13	27th	3255	
2007	Ginn Racing	13	Chevy	DAY; 9	CAL; 14	LVS; 38	ATL; 17	BRI; DNQ	MAR; 27	TEX; 18	PHO; 16	TAL; 38	RCH; 33	DAR; 28	CLT; 26	DOV; 25	POC; 15	MCH; 30	SON; 38	NHA; 41	DAY; 30	CHI; 29																		37th	2117	
2007	E&M Motorsports	08	Dodge																				IND; DNQ	POC	GLN	MCH; 43	BRI													37th	2117	
2007	Furniture Row Racing	78	Chevy																									CAL; 43	RCH; 43	NHA; 29	DOV; 22	KAN; 25	TAL; 32	CLT; DNQ	MAR; DNQ	ATL; 36	TEX; 35	PHO; 38	HOM; DNQ	37th	2117	
2008	Furniture Row Racing	78	Chevy	DAY; 41	CAL; 34	LVS; DNQ	ATL; 36	BRI; 35	MAR; DNQ	TEX; 37	PHO; 40	**TAL**; 25	RCH; 29	DAR; 31	CLT; DNQ	DOV; 34	POC; 29	MCH; 28	SON; 26	NHA; 20	DAY; 18	CHI; 39	IND; 29	POC; 41	GLN; 38	MCH; 34	BRI; 29	CAL; 43	RCH; 40	NHA; 43	DOV; 35	KAN; 38	TAL; 11	CLT; 37	MAR; 43	ATL; 42	TEX; 38	PHO; DNQ	HOM; 36	37th	1989	
2009	NEMCO Motorsports	87	Toyota	DAY; DNQ	CAL; 43	LVS; 41	ATL; 39	BRI; 41	MAR; 41	TEX; DNQ	PHO; 41	TAL; 14	RCH; 40	DAR; QL^{†}	CLT; 37	DOV; 38	POC; 41	MCH; 42	SON; QL^{†}	NHA; 39	DAY; 41	CHI; 41	IND; 43	POC; 39	GLN; DNQ	MCH; 39	BRI; 41	ATL; 42	RCH; 35	NHA; 40	DOV; 41	KAN; 42	CAL; 39	CLT; 43	MAR; 38	TAL; 43	TEX; 42	PHO; 40	HOM; DNQ	40th	1342	
2010	NEMCO Motorsports	87	Toyota	DAY; 43	CAL; 40	LVS; 41	ATL; 38	BRI; 43	MAR; 39	PHO; 38	TEX; 40	TAL; 42	RCH; 43	DAR; DNQ	DOV; 38	CLT; 39	POC; 43	MCH; 37	SON; 40	NHA; 39	DAY; 41	CHI; 43	IND; 40	POC; 40	GLN; 39	MCH; 43	BRI; DNQ	ATL; 38	RCH; 42	NHA; 40	DOV; 41	KAN; DNQ	CAL; 37	CLT; DNQ	MAR; 41	TAL; 27	TEX; 43	PHO; DNQ	HOM; 41	38th	1361	
2011	NEMCO Motorsports	87	Toyota	DAY; 39	PHO; 43	LVS; 42	BRI; 41	CAL; 42	MAR; 43	TEX; 39	TAL; 41	RCH; 42	DAR; 42	DOV; 39	CLT; 41	KAN; 43	POC; 40	MCH; 40	SON; 40	DAY; 30	KEN; 39	NHA; 41	IND; 38	POC; 41	GLN; 40	MCH; 41	BRI; 40	ATL; 40	RCH; 41	CHI; 40	NHA; 36	DOV; 39	KAN; 41	CLT; 43	TAL; 41	MAR; 41	TEX; 42	PHO; 41	HOM; 40	65th	0^{1}	
2012	NEMCO Motorsports	87	Toyota	DAY; 28	PHO; 40	LVS; 41	BRI; 40	CAL; DNQ	MAR; 39	TEX; DNQ	KAN; 41	RCH; 41	TAL; 41	DAR; 40	CLT; 41	DOV; 39	POC; 37	MCH; 40	SON; 43	KEN; 40	DAY; 41	NHA; 38	IND; DNQ	POC; 36	GLN; 29	MCH; 36	BRI; 39	ATL; 43	RCH; 38	CHI; 40	NHA; 39	DOV; 39	TAL; 41	CLT; DNQ	KAN; 40	MAR; 41	TEX; 40	PHO; 39	HOM; DNQ	68th	0^{1}	
2013	NEMCO–Jay Robinson Racing	87	Toyota	DAY; 43	PHO; 31	LVS; 40	BRI; 29	CAL; 32	MAR; 34	TEX; 35	KAN; DNQ	RCH; 39	TAL; 39	DAR; 31	CLT; 41	DOV; 31	POC; 42	MCH; 36	SON	KEN; 37	DAY; 27	NHA; 25	IND; 41	POC; 37	GLN	MCH; 34	BRI; 43	ATL; 40	RCH; 39	CHI; 31	NHA; 35	DOV; 39	KAN; 41	CLT; 39	TAL; 42	MAR; 33	TEX; 36	PHO; 38	HOM; 35	64th	0^{1}	
2014	Identity Ventures Racing	87	Toyota	DAY; DNQ		LVS; DNQ							TAL; DNQ																											66th	0^{1}	
2014	Identity Ventures Racing	66	Toyota		PHO; 40		BRI; 41	CAL; 32	MAR; 43	TEX; DNQ	DAR; 34	RCH; 37		KAN; 31	CLT; 34	DOV	POC	MCH	SON	KEN; 38				POC; 40	GLN; 30	MCH; 35	BRI		RCH; 40	CHI; 36	NHA	DOV	KAN	CLT						66th	0^{1}	
2014	RAB Racing	29	Toyota																		DAY; DNQ	NHA	IND												TAL; DNQ	MAR	TEX	PHO	HOM	66th	0^{1}	
2014	Randy Humphrey Racing	77	Ford																									ATL; 37												66th	0^{1}	
2015	NEMCO Motorsports	87	Chevy	DAY; Wth																																				68th	0^{1}	
2015	Front Row Motorsports	34	Ford		ATL; 33	LVS	PHO	CAL	MAR	TEX	BRI	RCH	TAL	KAN	CLT	DOV	POC	MCH	SON	DAY	KEN	NHA	IND	POC	GLN	MCH	BRI	DAR	RCH	CHI	NHA	DOV	CLT	KAN	TAL	MAR	TEX	PHO	HOM	68th	0^{1}	
2019	Premium Motorsports	27	Chevy	DAY	ATL	LVS	PHO	CAL	MAR	TEX	BRI	RCH	TAL	DOV	KAN	CLT	POC	MCH	SON	CHI	DAY	KEN	NHA	POC	GLN	MCH	BRI	DAR; 31	IND	LVS; 34	RCH	ROV; 31	DOV; 30	TAL	KAN	MAR		PHO; 34		57th	0^{1}	
2019	Premium Motorsports	15	Chevy																																		TEX; 29		HOM; 38	57th	0^{1}	
^{†} – Qualified for Scott Speed

===== Daytona 500 =====
Year	Team	Manufacturer	Start	Finish
1994	Larry Hedrick Motorsports	Chevrolet	DNQ	
1995	NEMCO Motorsports	Chevrolet	23	42
1996	NEMCO Motorsports	Chevrolet	37	39
1997	Team SABCO	Chevrolet	DNQ	
1997	Barkdoll Racing	Chevrolet	38	27
1998	Team SABCO	Chevrolet	28	26
1999	Team SABCO	Chevrolet	32	36
2000	Andy Petree Racing	Chevrolet	16	42
2001	Andy Petree Racing	Chevrolet	32	11
2002	Haas-Carter Motorsports	Ford	25	40
2003	Hendrick Motorsports	Chevrolet	15	22
2004	MB2 Motorsports	Chevrolet	14	6
2005	MB2 Motorsports	Chevrolet	34	13
2006	MB2 Motorsports	Chevrolet	38	33
2007	Ginn Racing	Chevrolet	18	9
2008	Furniture Row Racing	Chevrolet	41	41
2009	NEMCO Motorsports	Toyota	DNQ	
2010	NEMCO Motorsports	Toyota	41	43
2011	NEMCO Motorsports	Toyota	41	39
2012	NEMCO Motorsports	Toyota	34	28
2013	NEMCO-Jay Robinson Racing	Toyota	27	43
2014	Identity Ventures Racing	Toyota	DNQ	
2015	NEMCO Motorsports	Toyota	Wth	

==== Xfinity Series ====
NASCAR Xfinity Series results
Year	Team	No.	Make	1	2	3	4	5	6	7	8	9	10	11	12	13	14	15	16	17	18	19	20	21	22	23	24	25	26	27	28	29	30	31	32	33	34	35	NXSC	Pts	Ref
1989	NEMCO Motorsports	88	Buick	DAY	CAR	MAR	HCY	DAR	BRI	NZH	SBO	LAN	NSV	CLT	DOV	ROU	LVL	VOL	MYB	SBO	HCY	DUB	IRP	ROU	BRI	DAR	RCH	DOV	MAR	CLT	CAR; 33	MAR							91st	64	
1990	NEMCO Motorsports	87	Buick	DAY; 8	RCH; 18	CAR	MAR; 15	HCY; 23	DAR; 19	BRI; 9	LAN; 20	SBO; 20	NZH; 34	HCY; 20	CLT; 38	DOV; 27	ROU; 25	VOL; 6	MYB; 5	OXF; DNQ	NHA; 19	SBO; 21	DUB; 5	IRP; 23	ROU; 18	BRI; 14	DAR; 20	RCH; 16	DOV; 15	MAR; 22	CLT; 27	NHA; 19	CAR; DNQ	MAR; 16					17th	3022	
1991	NEMCO Motorsports	87	Chevy	DAY; 21	RCH; 9	CAR; 14	MAR; 16	VOL; 19	HCY; 3	DAR; 7	BRI; 12	LAN; 18	SBO; 2	NZH; 18	CLT; 24	DOV; 10	ROU; 24	HCY; 10	MYB; 5	GLN; 2	OXF; 10	NHA; 6	SBO; 17	DUB; 8	IRP; 6	ROU; 6	BRI; 16	DAR; 37	RCH; 8	DOV; 6	CLT; 16	NHA; 28	CAR; 4	MAR; 31					6th	3902	
1992	NEMCO Motorsports	87	Chevy	DAY; 31	CAR; 12	RCH; 5	ATL; 21	MAR; 2	DAR; 13	BRI; 10	HCY; 4	LAN; 5	DUB; 6	NZH; 11	CLT; 22	DOV; 5	ROU; 2	MYB; 19	GLN; 4	VOL; 4	NHA; 9	TAL; 13	IRP; 1	**ROU**; 2	MCH; 10	NHA; 1	BRI; 15	DAR; 26	RCH; 5	DOV; 15	CLT; 11	MAR; 5	CAR; 16	HCY; 6					1st	4275	
1993	NEMCO Motorsports	87	Chevy	DAY; 9	CAR; 11	RCH; 2	DAR; 22	BRI; 4	HCY; 3	ROU; 20	MAR; 11	NZH; 19	CLT; 40	DOV; 26	MYB; 3	GLN; 4	MLW; 9	TAL; 28	IRP; 11	MCH; 22	**NHA**; 2*	BRI; 2	DAR; 4	RCH; 11	DOV; 24*	**ROU**; 14	CLT; 27	**MAR**; 14*	CAR; 36	HCY; 22	ATL; 6								5th	3443	
1994	NEMCO Motorsports	87	Chevy	DAY; 34	CAR	RCH; 1*	ATL; 43	MAR	DAR	HCY	BRI	ROU	NHA; 32	NZH	CLT; 31	DOV; 9	MYB	GLN; 34	MLW	SBO	TAL; 12	HCY	IRP	MCH	BRI	DAR; 11	RCH; 17	DOV	CLT; 26	MAR	CAR								40th	1065	
1995	NEMCO Motorsports	87	Chevy	DAY; 12	CAR	RCH	ATL; 38	NSV	DAR; 7	BRI	HCY	NHA	NZH	CLT	DOV	MYB	GLN	MLW	TAL; 4	SBO	IRP	MCH	BRI	DAR; 5	RCH	DOV	CLT	CAR	**HOM**; 7										42nd	783	
1996	NEMCO Motorsports	87	Chevy	DAY; 37	CAR	RCH; 2	ATL; 10	NSV; 6	DAR; DNQ	BRI	HCY	NZH	CLT; 8	DOV	SBO	MYB	GLN; 32	MLW	NHA; 35	**TAL**; 2*	IRP	MCH	BRI	DAR; 13	RCH	DOV	CLT; 36	CAR	HOM; 4										38th	1282	
1997	NEMCO Motorsports	87	Chevy	DAY; 4	CAR	RCH	ATL; 5	LVS; 33	DAR	HCY	TEX	BRI	NSV	**TAL**; 41	NHA	NZH	CLT; 1*	DOV	SBO	**GLN**; 3*	MLW	MYB	GTY; 29*	IRP	MCH	BRI	DAR	RCH	DOV	**CLT**; 8	CAL	CAR	HOM; 1*						40th	1162	
1998	NEMCO Motorsports	87	Chevy	DAY; 1*	CAR	LVS; 3*	NSV; 6	DAR	BRI	TEX; 3*	HCY	**TAL**; 1	NHA	NZH	CLT; 2	DOV	RCH	PPR	GLN	MLW	MYB	CAL	SBO	IRP	MCH	BRI	DAR	RCH	DOV	CLT; 36	GTY	CAR	ATL; 7	HOM; 28					39th	1315	
1999	NEMCO Motorsports	87	Chevy	DAY; 36	CAR	LVS; 2	ATL; 27	DAR	TEX; 38	NSV; 4	BRI	TAL; 2	CAL; 31	NHA	RCH	NZH	CLT; 32	DOV	SBO	GLN	MLW	MYB	PPR	GTY; 3	IRP	MCH	BRI	DAR; 5	RCH	DOV	CLT; 8	CAR	MEM	PHO; DNQ	HOM; 1				33rd	1485	
2000	NEMCO Motorsports	87	Chevy	DAY; 2	CAR	LVS; 3	ATL; 33	DAR	BRI	TEX; 36	NSV	TAL; 1*	CAL; 37	RCH	NHA	CLT; 6	DOV; 5	SBO	MYB	GLN	MLW	NZH	PPR	GTY; 7	IRP	MCH; 13	BRI	DAR	RCH	DOV; 5	CLT; 5*	CAR	MEM	PHO; 42	HOM; 35				32nd	1691	
2001	NEMCO Motorsports	87	Pontiac	**DAY**; 32	CAR							**TAL**; 39																											35th	1541	
2001	NEMCO Motorsports	87	Chevy			LVS; 7	ATL; 1*	DAR	BRI	TEX; 4	NSH		CAL; 9	RCH	NHA	NZH	CLT	DOV	KEN	MLW	GLN	CHI; 4	GTY	PPR	IRP	MCH	BRI	DAR	RCH; 17	DOV; 37	KAN; 35	CLT; 26	MEM	PHO; 12	CAR	HOM; 1			35th	1541	
2002	NEMCO Motorsports	87	Pontiac	**DAY**; 43	CAR						TAL; 34										**DAY**; 1*																		34th	1773	
2002	NEMCO Motorsports	87	Chevy			LVS; 14	DAR	BRI	TEX; 3	NSH		CAL; 41	RCH	NHA	NZH	CLT	DOV; 13	NSH	KEN; 25	MLW		CHI; 4	GTY	PPR	IRP	MCH; 11	BRI	DAR	RCH	DOV	KAN; 3	CLT; 3	MEM	ATL; 6	CAR	PHO	HOM; 3		34th	1773	
2003	NEMCO Motorsports	87	Chevy	**DAY**; INQ^{†}	CAR	LVS; 1	DAR; 34	BRI	TEX; 1				RCH; 36	GTY	NZH	CLT	**DOV**; 1	NSH	KEN	MLW						MCH; 13	BRI	DAR	RCH		KAN; 9	CLT; 36	MEM	ATL	PHO; 4	CAR	HOM; 19		31st	1704	
2003	NEMCO Motorsports	87	Pontiac							**TAL**; 2	NSH										DAY; 18																		31st	1704	
2003	NEMCO Motorsports	88	Chevy									CAL; 43										CHI; 43																	31st	1704	
2003	Evans Motorsports	7	Chevy																				NHA; 31	PPR	IRP														31st	1704	
2003	Michael Waltrip Racing	99	Chevy																											DOV; 40									31st	1704	
2004	NEMCO Motorsports	87	Chevy	DAY; 40	CAR	LVS; 9	DAR; 28	BRI; 11	TEX; 7	NSH	TAL; 10			RCH; 36	NZH	CLT; 21	DOV; 36	NSH	KEN	MLW	DAY	CHI; 31	NHA; 16	PPR	IRP	MCH; 36	BRI	CAL; 8	RCH	DOV	KAN; 1				PHO; 26	DAR	HOM; 8		31st	1777	
2004	NEMCO Motorsports	7	Chevy									CAL; 43	GTY																										31st	1777	
2004	NEMCO Motorsports	88	Chevy																													CLT; 43	MEM	ATL					31st	1777	
2005	NEMCO Motorsports	87	Chevy	**DAY**; 14	CAL; 12	MXC	LVS; 4	ATL	NSH	BRI; 41	TEX; 12	PHO; 6	TAL; 29	DAR	RCH	CLT; 19	DOV; 10	NSH	KEN	MLW	DAY; 7	CHI; 13	NHA	PPR	GTY	IRP	GLN; 7	MCH; 25	BRI	CAL; 17	RCH	DOV	KAN; 11	CLT	MEM	TEX; 23	PHO	HOM; 10	25th	2030	
2006	NEMCO Motorsports	87	Chevy	DAY; 40	CAL	MXC	LVS	ATL	BRI	TEX	NSH	PHO	TAL	RCH	DAR	CLT	DOV	NSH	KEN	MLW	DAY	CHI	NHA	MAR	GTY	IRP	GLN	MCH	BRI	CAL	RCH	DOV	KAN	CLT	MEM	TEX	PHO	HOM; 23	102nd	137	
2007	NEMCO Motorsports	87	Chevy	DAY; 34	CAL; 13	MXC	LVS; 16	ATL	BRI	NSH	TEX	PHO	TAL	RCH	DAR	CLT	DOV	NSH	KEN	MLW	NHA	DAY	CHI	GTY	IRP	CGV	GLN	MCH	BRI	CAL	RCH	DOV	KAN	CLT	MEM	TEX	PHO	HOM	89th	300	
2008	NEMCO Motorsports	87	Chevy	DAY; DNQ	CAL	LVS	ATL	BRI	NSH	TEX	PHO	MXC	TAL	RCH	DAR	CLT	DOV	NSH	KEN	MLW	NHA	DAY	CHI	GTY	IRP	CGV	GLN	MCH	BRI	CAL	RCH	DOV	KAN	CLT	MEM	TEX	PHO	HOM	NA	0	
2009	NEMCO Motorsports	87	Chevy	DAY; 13	CAL; 35	LVS; 20	BRI; 18	TEX; 39	NSH; 34	PHO; 25	TAL; 11	RCH; 18	DAR; 32	CLT; 36	DOV	NSH	KEN	MLW	NHA; 27	DAY; 24	CHI; 24	GTY	IRP	IOW	GLN; 26	MCH	BRI	CGV	ATL	RCH; 36	DOV; 35	KAN; 35	CAL; 37	CLT	MEM	TEX; 36	PHO; 36	HOM; 36	31st	1692	
2010	NEMCO Motorsports	87	Chevy	DAY; 31	CAL; 23	LVS; 18	BRI; 16	NSH; 28	PHO; 26	TEX; 19	TAL; 36	RCH; 35	DAR; 23	DOV; 26	CLT; 24	NSH	KEN; 25	ROA	NHA; 23	DAY; 16	CHI; 15	GTY; 27	IRP; 24	IOW; 19	GLN; 23	MCH; 21	BRI; 32		ATL; 29	RCH; 19	DOV; 25	KAN; 17	CAL; 14	CLT; 41	GTY; 28	TEX; 20	PHO; 28	HOM; 35	20th	2942	
2010	NEMCO Motorsports	97	Chevy																									CGV; 28											20th	2942	
2011	NEMCO Motorsports	87	Toyota	DAY; 15					TEX; 24	TAL; 3	NSH		DAR; 12	DOV; 19	IOW; 16		CHI; 21	MCH; 21	ROA		KEN; 12	NHA; 11	NSH	IRP; 7	IOW; 16	GLN; 11	CGV; 21		ATL; 18	RCH; 10	CHI	DOV; 30	KAN; 21		TEX; 21	PHO; 12			14th	755	
2011	NEMCO Motorsports	87	Chevy		PHO; 15		BRI; 21					RCH; 19																											14th	755	
2011	NEMCO Motorsports	97	Chevy			LVS; 23		CAL; 39																															14th	755	
2011	NEMCO Motorsports	97	Toyota													CLT; 29				DAY; 26								BRI; 21						CLT; 37			HOM; 16		14th	755	
2012	NEMCO Motorsports	87	Toyota	DAY; 23	PHO; 24	LVS; 20	BRI; 30	CAL; 19	TEX; 17	RCH; 13	TAL; 19	DAR; 11	IOW; 19	CLT; 29	DOV; 19	MCH; 15	ROA	KEN; 18	DAY; 22	NHA; 19	CHI; 13	IND; 18	IOW; 16			BRI; 11	ATL; 14	RCH; 8	CHI; 16	KEN; 27	DOV; 17	CLT; 17	KAN; 12	TEX; 20	PHO; 16	HOM; 18			11th	816	
2012	NEMCO Motorsports	97	Toyota																					GLN; 27															11th	816	
2012	Robinson-Blakeney Racing	70	Dodge																						CGV; 30														11th	816	
2013	NEMCO-Jay Robinson Racing	87	Toyota	DAY; 18	PHO; 36	LVS; 27	BRI; 24	CAL; 14	TEX; 19	RCH; 23	TAL; 37	DAR; 24	CLT; 32	DOV; 33	IOW; QL^{‡}	MCH; 29	ROA	KEN; 33	DAY; 19	NHA; 22	CHI; 23	IND; 23	IOW	GLN	MOH	BRI; 18	ATL; 24	RCH; 29	CHI; 30	KEN; 23	DOV; 23	KAN; 25	CLT; 23	TEX; 33	PHO; 30	HOM; 26			19th	513	
2014	NEMCO-Jay Robinson Racing	87	Toyota	DAY; 12	PHO	LVS	BRI; 19	CAL	TEX	DAR		TAL; 6	IOW	CLT	DOV; 17	MCH	ROA	KEN																					92nd	0^{1}	
2014	DRG Motorsports	86	Chevy								RCH; 23																												92nd	0^{1}	
2014	NEMCO-Jay Robinson Racing	97	Toyota																DAY; 27	NHA	CHI	IND	IOW	GLN	MOH	BRI	ATL	RCH	CHI	KEN	DOV	KAN	CLT	TEX	PHO	HOM			92nd	0^{1}	
2015	NEMCO Motorsports	87	Chevy	DAY; DNQ	ATL	LVS	PHO	CAL	TEX	BRI	RCH	TAL	IOW	CLT	DOV	MCH	CHI	DAY	KEN	NHA	IND	IOW	GLN	MOH	BRI	ROA	DAR	RCH	CHI	KEN	DOV	CLT	KAN	TEX	PHO	HOM			118th	0^{1}	
2016	NEMCO Motorsports	87	Toyota	DAY; 19	ATL	LVS	PHO	CAL	TEX	BRI	RCH	TAL	DOV	CLT	POC	MCH	IOW	DAY; 36	KEN	NHA	IND	IOW	GLN	MOH	BRI	ROA	DAR	RCH	CHI	KEN	DOV	CLT	KAN	TEX	PHO	HOM			112th	0^{1}	
2017	JD Motorsports	15	Chevy	DAY	ATL	LVS	PHO	CAL	TEX	BRI	RCH	TAL	CLT	DOV	POC	MCH	IOW	DAY	KEN	NHA	IND	IOW	GLN	MOH	BRI	ROA	DAR	RCH	CHI	KEN	DOV	CLT	KAN	TEX	PHO; 35				107th	0^{1}	
2017	JD Motorsports	01	Chevy																																	HOM; 27			107th	0^{1}	
2018	JD Motorsports	15	Chevy	DAY; 23	ATL	LVS	PHO	CAL	TEX	BRI; 19	RCH; 25	TAL; 31	DOV; 31	CLT; 18	POC	MCH	IOW	CHI	DAY	KEN	NHA	IOW	GLN	MOH	BRI	ROA	DAR	IND	LVS	RCH	ROV	DOV	KAN	TEX	PHO	HOM			102nd	0^{1}	
2019	MBM Motorsports	13	Toyota	DAY	ATL	LVS	PHO	CAL	TEX	BRI	RCH	TAL	DOV	CLT; 32	POC	MCH	IOW	CHI; DNQ	DAY; 36	KEN	NHA	IOW	GLN	MOH															96th	0^{1}	
2019	Mike Harmon Racing	17	Chevy																						BRI; 35	ROA	DAR; 34	IND	LVS; 33	RCH; 32		DOV; 30	KAN	TEX	PHO; 34				96th	0^{1}	
2019	Mike Harmon Racing	74	Chevy																												ROV; 22					HOM; 29			96th	0^{1}	
2020	Mike Harmon Racing	47	Chevy	DAY; 15	LVS; 27	CAL	PHO; 32	DAR; 28	CLT; 26	BRI; 32	ATL; 32	HOM	HOM	TAL	POC	IRC	KEN	KEN	TEX	KAN	ROA	DRC	DOV	DOV	DAY	DAR	RCH	RCH	BRI	LVS	TAL; 16	ROV	KAN	TEX	MAR	PHO			82nd	0^{1}	
2022	Sam Hunt Racing	24	Toyota	DAY	CAL	LVS	PHO	ATL	COA	RCH	MAR	TAL	DOV	DAR	TEX	CLT	PIR	NSH	ROA	ATL	NHA	POC	IRC	MCH	GLN	DAY; DNQ	DAR	KAN	BRI	TEX	TAL	ROV	LVS	HOM	MAR	PHO			N/A	0	
^{†} – Qualified but replaced by Jeff Green · ^{‡} – Qualified but replaced by Kevin Lepage

==== Camping World Truck Series ====
NASCAR Camping World Truck Series results
Year	Team	No.	Make	1	2	3	4	5	6	7	8	9	10	11	12	13	14	15	16	17	18	19	20	21	22	23	24	25	26	27	NCWTC	Pts	Ref
1996	NEMCO Motorsports	87	Chevy	HOM	PHO	POR	EVG	TUS	CNS	HPT	BRI	NZH	MLW	LVL	I70	IRP	FLM	GLN; 2	NSV	RCH	NHA	MAR	NWS	SON	MMR	PHO; 8	LVS				62nd	312	
1997	NEMCO Motorsports	87	Chevy	WDW; 27	TUS	HOM	PHO	POR	EVG	I70	NHA	TEX	BRI	NZH	MLW	LVL	CNS	HPT	IRP	FLM	NSV	GLN	RCH	MAR	SON	MMR	CAL	PHO	LVS		115th	82	
1998	NEMCO Motorsports	87	Chevy	WDW; 6	HOM	PHO	POR	EVG	I70	GLN	TEX	BRI	MLW	NZH	CAL	PPR	IRP	NHA	FLM	NSV	HPT	LVL	RCH	MEM	GTY	MAR	SON	MMR	PHO	LVS	76th	150	
2006	Morgan Dollar Motorsports	46	Chevy	DAY	CAL	ATL	MAR	GTY	CLT	MFD	DOV	TEX	MCH	MLW	KAN	KEN	MEM	IRP	NSH	BRI	NHA	LVS	TAL; 28	MAR	ATL; 35	TEX	PHO	HOM; 6			53rd	292	
2014	SWM-NEMCO Motorsports	8	Toyota	DAY; 8	MAR	KAN; 9	CLT; 11	DOV	TEX; 3	GTW	KEN; 14	IOW	ELD	POC; 10	MCH; 10	BRI	MSP	CHI; 9	NHA	LVS; 17	TAL; 10	MAR	TEX; 8	PHO	HOM; 8						19th	413	
2015	SWM-NEMCO Motorsports	8	Chevy	DAY; 20	ATL; 10	MAR	KAN	CLT; 11	DOV	TEX; 6	GTW	IOW	KEN	ELD	POC	MCH	BRI	MSP	CHI	NHA	LVS	TAL	MAR	TEX	PHO	HOM					33rd	129	
2017	NEMCO Motorsports	87	Chevy	DAY; 5	ATL; 24	MAR; 18	KAN	CLT	DOV	TEX	GTW; 28	IOW; 31	KEN; DNQ	ELD	POC; 29	MCH; 30	BRI; 32	MSP; 31	CHI; 31	NHA; 26	LVS; 26	TAL; 30	MAR	TEX; 31	PHO; 29	HOM; 29					28th	166	
2018	NEMCO Motorsports	87	Chevy	DAY; 3		LVS; 31	MAR; Wth		KAN; 30	CLT; Wth		IOW; 31	GTW; 32	CHI; 28	KEN; DNQ	ELD		MCH; 30	BRI	MSP; 32	LVS; 31	TAL; 30	MAR		PHO; 32	HOM; 31					21st	234	
2018	NEMCO Motorsports	8	Chevy		ATL; 12			DOV; 7			TEX; 15						POC; 10							TEX; 18							21st	234	
2019	NEMCO Motorsports	87	Chevy	DAY; 16							CLT; 32	TEX; 28	IOW	GTW	CHI; 28	KEN; 32	POC; 28	ELD							PHO; 32						30th	144	
2019	NEMCO Motorsports	8	Chevy		ATL; 32	LVS	MAR	TEX; 25	DOV; 26	KAN; 24									MCH; 20	BRI	MSP	LVS	TAL	MAR		HOM; 14					30th	144	
2020	NEMCO Motorsports	87	Ford	DAY; DNQ	LVS	CLT	ATL	HOM	POC	KEN	TEX	KAN	KAN	MCH	DRC	DOV	GTW	DAR	RCH	BRI	LVS										77th	5	
2020	NEMCO Motorsports	8	Ford																			TAL; 37	KAN	TEX	MAR	PHO					77th	5	
2021	NEMCO Motorsports	8	Ford	DAY; DNQ	DRC	LVS	ATL	BRD	RCH	KAN	DAR	COA	CLT	TEX	NSH	POC	KNX	GLN	GTW	DAR	BRI	LVS	TAL	MAR	PHO						119th	-	

^{*} Season still in progress
^{1} Ineligible for series points

Sporting positions
Preceded by Bobby Labonte	NASCAR Busch Series Champion; 1992	Succeeded by Steve Grissom
Achievements
Preceded by Kenny Wallace	NASCAR Busch Series Rookie of the Year; 1990	Succeeded by Jeff Gordon
