= Keasbey and Mattison Company =

American asbestos manufacturer

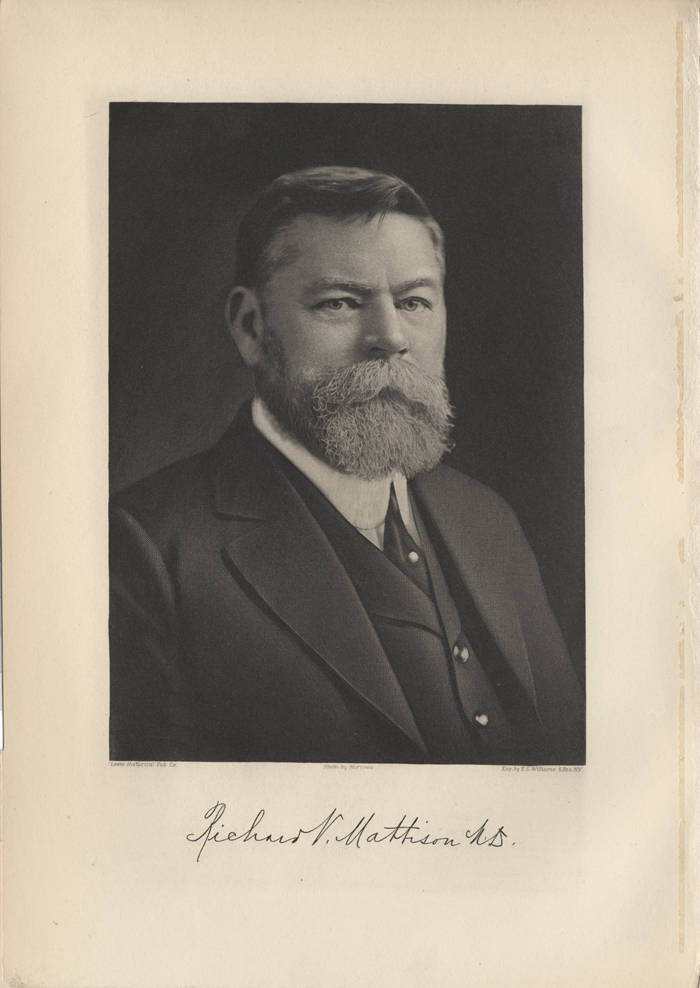
Richard Mattison

Keasbey and Mattison Company was a manufacturing company that produced asbestos-related building products, including insulation and shingles. Founded in 1873 by Henry Griffith Keasbey (1850 - May 30, 1932 Philadelphia) and Richard Van Zeelust Mattison (Nov 17, 1851 Solebury - Nov 18, 1936 Ambler), the company moved to Ambler, Pennsylvania, in 1881. By World War I, the Keasbey and Mattison Company's presence caused Ambler to be known as the "asbestos capital of the world", although Manville, New Jersey, where the 1,000,000 square foot Johns Manville plant was completed in 1913 was more deserving of this title going forward. Keasbey and Mattison was purchased by Turner & Newall in 1934.

== History ==
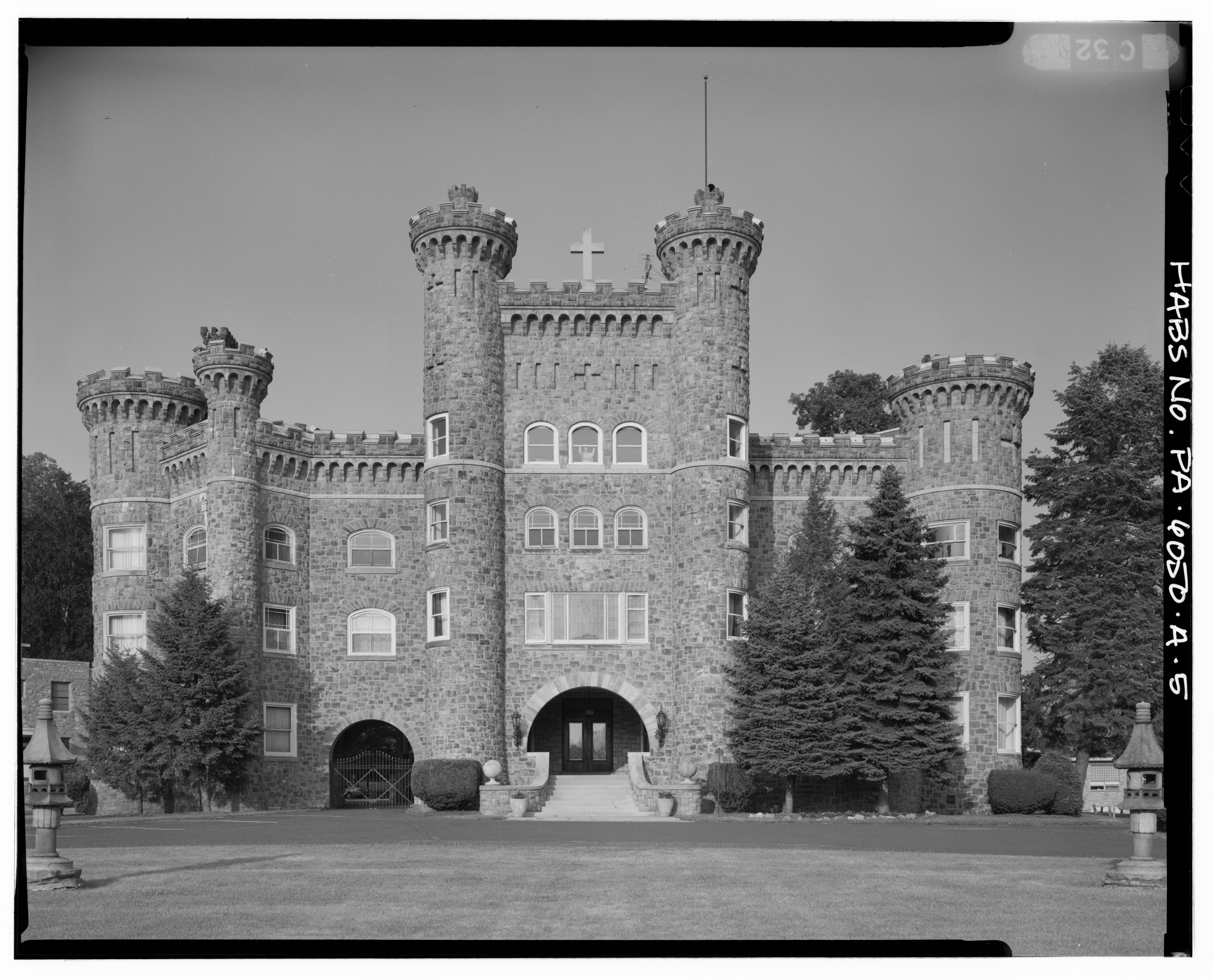
Lindenwold Castle, home of Richard Mattison

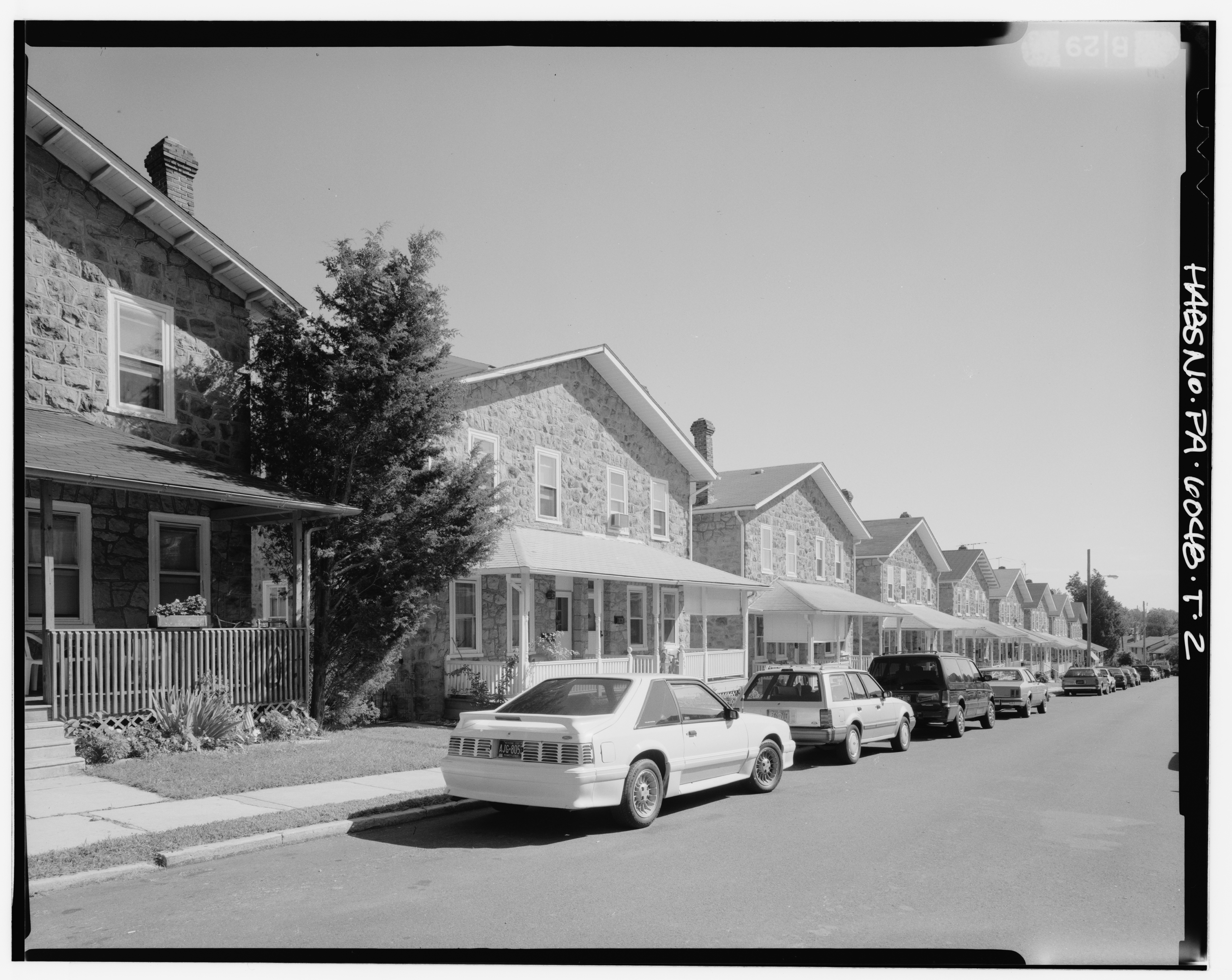
Keasbey and Mattison company houses, Ambler, PA

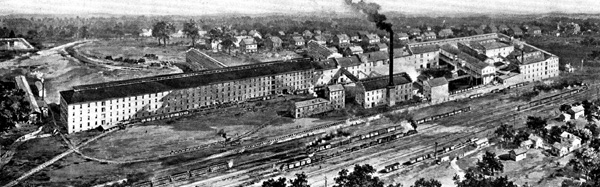
The Keasbey & Mattison Company, Ambler, PA 40.15242°N 75.22457°W

The Keasbey and Mattison Company was founded in 1873 in Philadelphia, Pennsylvania by Henry G. Keasbey, a businessman, and Dr. Richard V. Mattison, a chemist/pharmacist. The company originally manufactured and marketed patent medicines. Working in a company laboratory, Mattison discovered that a mixture of magnesium carbonate and asbestos would adhere to a hot metal pipe, and could be turned into an insulation material for steam pipes. Asbestos and related building products soon became the focus of the company.

Mattison moved the company from Philadelphia to Ambler, Pennsylvania, in 1881. Ambler's location along the railroad line was a primary consideration in the location of Keasbey and Mattison Company in Ambler, as it meant that asbestos could be easily brought in from Quebec, and products sent out. Another consideration was the availability of magnesium carbonate, which could be locally mined. The original K&M factory was built as of 1883, conveniently placed near the railroad.

When Keasbey and Mattison relocated, the town consisted of "70 houses, 250 residents, a drug store, general store and a few other businesses."

Keasbey and Mattison became the dominant employer of the town of Ambler and had a major impact on it. Mattison built homes for the company's workers and executives. He founded a library and built an opera house, offices, shops, and Trinity Memorial Episcopal Church. He owned the Ambler Water Co. and the Ambler Electric Light, Heat & Motor Co. He also ensured that Ambler was incorporated as a borough. Mattison brought in stone masons from Southern Italy to work on his estate, modifying an existing Victorian structure in homage to Windsor Castle and naming it Lindenwold Castle. German craftsmen were imported to work on the iron gates.

By 1892, Henry Keasbey retired from active involvement in the company. Under Mattison's direction, the company expanded, purchasing the Bell mine in Thetford Mines, Quebec, Canada in 1906 and another mine at Bear Canyon, Arizona in 1928. Bell Mines excavated and milled raw chrysotile asbestos, using the open-cut method. Asbestos was then shipped by railway to Ambler, where it was processed and used to create a wide variety of products.

Keasbey and Mattison did extensive research and product development. By 1896, the plant included areas to produce roofing tiles, papers, pipe coverings, and the nation's first asbestos textile plant. By 1897, they were producing asbestos paper and millboard for electrical insulation and welding shields. As of 1905, they began to use the Hatschek process for manufacturing asbestos cement roofing shingles, which they sold under the name "Century Asbestos Slate". They even released advertising postcards, showing elegant buildings that used the new materials. By 1906, they were treating lumber with asbestos. By 1909, they were making asbestos brake linings for automobiles and railway trains.

In a 1920 report, the Pennsylvania Department of Health noted that the Ambler plant employed 900 men and used 1,000,000 gallons of Wissahickon Creek water daily. The plant was applauded for its "admirable scheme" of color-coding all water pipes, to distinguish between creek water (blue) and drinkable water (yellow). The company also had a first aid room with a doctor in attendance at all times. However, the amount of waste released downstream was "tremendous" and gave the creek "a milky appearance". K&M disposed of out-of-specification asbestos containing manufacturing materials and other solid waste in a waste dump adjacent to the factory which grew to 25 feet high and covered 2 1/2 acres.

Little or nothing was known about the dangers of asbestos when the plant was built. By modern standards, working conditions at the plant were hazardous, as workers came into daily contact with the mineral. Raw asbestos fibers were stirred into cement slurries or beaten by hand and fed into carding machines. Ventilation was rarely used in the rooms, and the men working in the plant did not wear ventilator masks.

In 1921 the company bought the historical Hope Lodge property from Mary Wentz for $40,000. Their test excavations showed that there was limestone on the site, and they apparently considered extending an already functioning limestone quarry. However, in 1922, they sold the property to William and Alice Degn.

With the onset of the Great Depression, Mattison found himself overextended, and in 1931 the company was taken over by bankers. This was in part due to the fact that Henry Keasbey sold his 50% equity a month before the crash of 1929 for $4 million. The proceeds of which have been used to finance higher education and other good works. Today the Henry and Anna Griffith Keasbey Foundation still supports scholarships for study at Oxford University and other British education institutions. Originally it was meant to support Americans to study in Great Britain. In 1934, the Keasbey and Mattison Company was sold to English company Turner & Newall, but retained its own name. T&N operated the plant until 1962, and had "100 percent control over decision making on policy matters". In 1962, the property was purchased by CertainTeed Corporation and Nicolet Industries and divided in two. Both companies produced asbestos products and auto parts at the location.

Turner & Newall was acquired by Federal-Mogul in 1998. Federal-Mogul eventually filed for Chapter 11 protection as a result of asbestos claims.

The U.S. Environmental Protection Agency (EPA) conducted an emergency removal action in 2008 which included capping the asbestos waste pile with a geotextile material and 2 feet of clean material and stream bank stabilization of three creeks. The EPA added the BoRit Asbestos site to the Superfund National Priorities List in April 2009.

In 2013, Heckendorn Shiles Architects and Summit Realty Advisers successfully converted the original "Boiler House" portion of the Keasbey & Mattison factory in Ambler. This derelict factory and smokestack of the Keasbey & Mattison company was converted into a LEED Platinum Certified multi-tenant office building, the Ambler Boiler House. The adaptive reuse project won support from the EPA’s Brownfields Program and the EnergyWorks program. The renovations cost $16 million, and have resulted in a building with substantial green features including a grey-water system, geothermal energy, solar panels and a reflective roof system, and high-efficiency glass.

== See also ==
- Hunt v. T&N plc
