= CertainTeed =

North American building materials manufacturer

CertainTeed is a North American manufacturer of building materials for both commercial and residential construction and is a wholly owned subsidiary of Saint-Gobain SA, based in Paris.

== History ==
The company was established in 1904 as the General Roofing Manufacturing Company by George M. Brown in East St. Louis, Illinois, with $25,000 in start-up capital. In 1917, the company restructured, incorporated, and changed its name to the Certain-teed Products Corporation. It began trading on the New York Stock Exchange in 1918.

== Operations ==
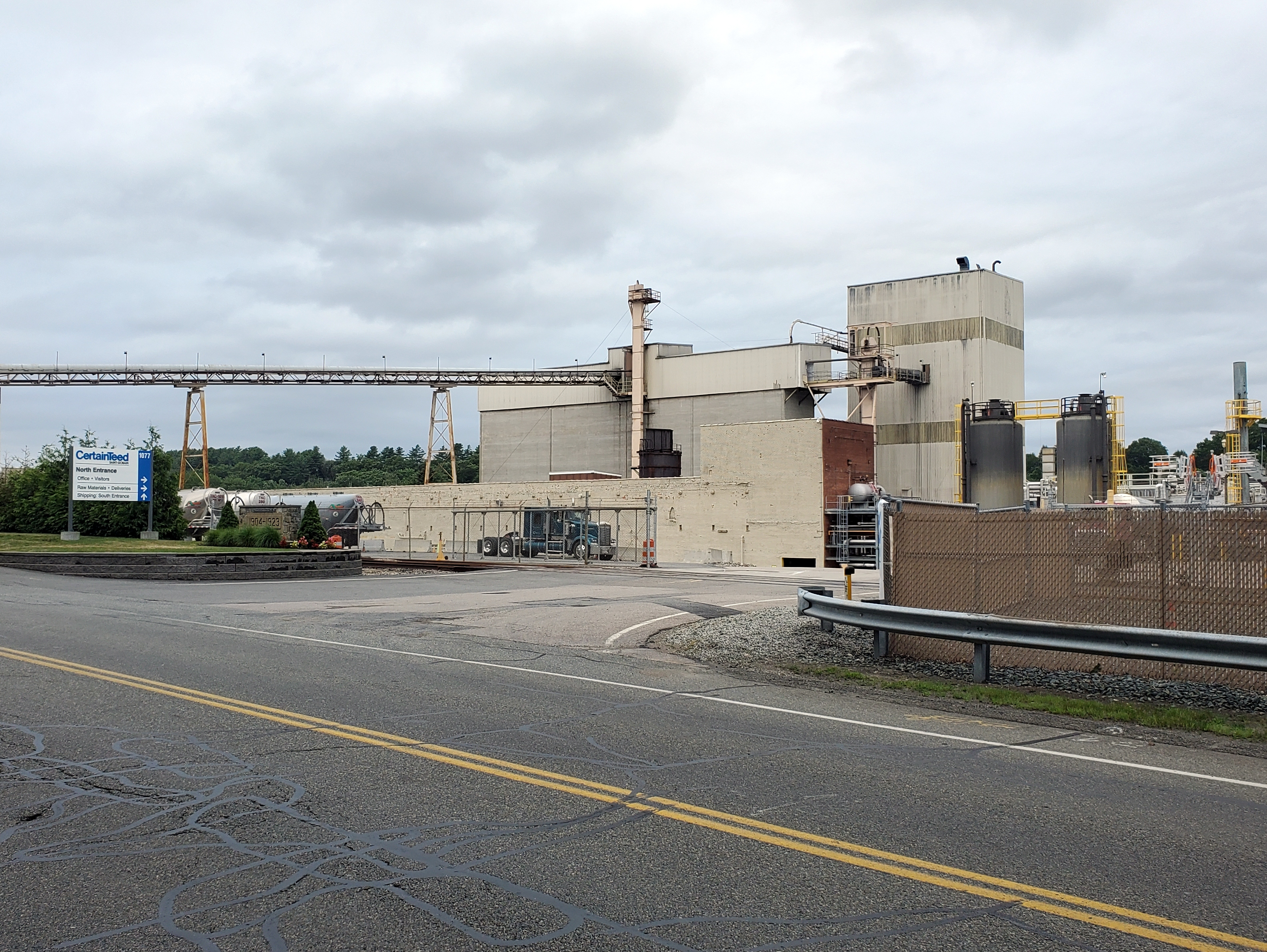
CertainTeed plant in Norwood, Massachusetts

CertainTeed operates 65 manufacturing plants in the United States and Canada. Certainteed manufactures products for four industries : Roofing, Siding, Insulation, Gypsum and Ceilings. It exports building products to more than 50 countries. CertainTeed has held more than 350 patents on its products in the past 30 years. In 2015, CertainTeed was recognized as the top brand in Siding: insulated, Siding: Vinyl categories, Roofing: Clay/Concrete/Synthetic Tiles, and Roofing Photovoltaic categories.

== Litigation ==
Historically, CertainTeed was a major manufacturer of asbestos-cement pipes for water utilities for many decades. Asbestos was mixed into the cement as a binder. CertainTeed phased out the use of asbestos in its products around 1990. As a result, CertainTeed is now a major defendant in product liability lawsuits brought by persons who worked on water utility projects and their families.

On April 29, 2010, in a product liability case filed by a mesothelioma patient whose husband used to cut CertainTeed pipe for a living, a Los Angeles Superior Court jury returned a verdict of $8.8 million in compensatory damages and $200 million in punitive damages against CertainTeed and the Los Angeles Department of Water and Power. The allocation of fault was 70% to CertainTeed and 30% to LADWP. On July 21, 2010, the Court overturned this verdict, and specifically granted CertainTeed's post-trial motions, holding that the punitive damage award was unconstitutional, that the amount of punitive damages could not exceed the amount of compensatory damages, and that a new trial was required on all issues. The case is currently on appeal.

A class action suit brought by representatives of the end users against CertainTeed Organic Shingles was approved on September 1, 2010. The complaint was that the shingles were subject to early failure or did not perform as expected by warranty. Some 30 years shingle only lasted 10 years. CertainTeed denies that the shingles were faulty, but quit manufacturing that particular type in 2005. The Court's role in the Settlement was to make sure there was a proper and fair settlement and did not decide in favor of either the Class or CertainTeed. A similar lawsuit is underway for similar complaints arising from CertainTeed Landmark, Independence, and Presidential fiberglass shingles.

Throughout 2011 and 2012, many home owners that purchased CertainTeed Fiber Cement Siding (also called WeatherBoards Fiber Cement exterior siding) filed class action lawsuits against the manufacturer due to problems with shrinking, cracking and warping. The product was made with fly ash which is a byproduct of the coal burning process.

On January 23, 2020 the successor to CertainTeed filed for bankruptcy protection for Certainteed's asbestos products in U.S. Bankruptcy Court for the Western District of North Carolina in Charlotte.
