= Samuel Harding =

Samuel Harding may refer to:

- Samuel Harding (American football) (1873–1919), American college football coach
- Samuel Harding (cabinetmaker) (died 1758), American craftsman
- Sam Harding (rugby union), New Zealand rugby union player
