= Andrew Hamilton (lawyer) =

American lawyer (1676–1741)

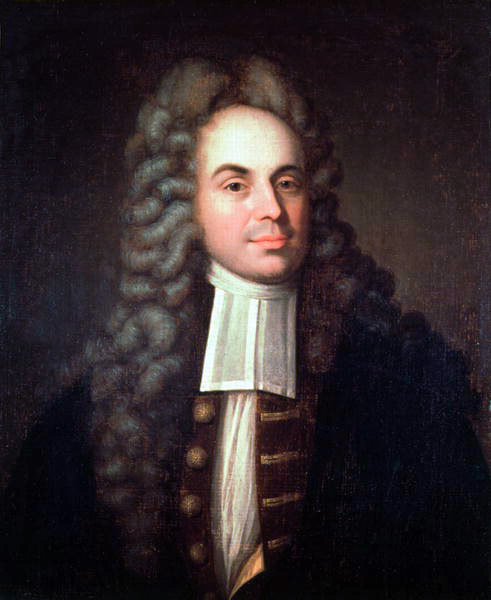
- An 1808 portrait of Hamilton by Adolf Ulrik Wertmüller

18th Speaker of the Pennsylvania House of Representatives
- In office 1736–1737
- In office 1741–1749

Personal details
- Born: c. 1676 Kingdom of Scotland
- Died: August 4, 1741 Philadelphia, Pennsylvania, British America
- Spouse: Anne Brown Preeson
- Profession: Lawyer
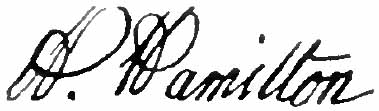
- Signature

Andrew Hamilton (c.1676 – August 4, 1741) was a Scottish lawyer in the Thirteen Colonies who settled in Philadelphia. He was best known for his legal victory on behalf of the printer and newspaper publisher John Peter Zenger. His involvement with the 1735 decision in New York helped to establish that truth is a defense to an accusation of libel. His eloquent defense concluded with saying that the press has "a liberty both of exposing and opposing tyrannical power by speaking and writing truth."

His success in this case has been said to have inspired the term "Philadelphia lawyer", meaning a particularly adept and clever attorney, as in "It would take a Philadelphia lawyer to get him off." His estate in Philadelphia, known as Bush Hill, was inherited by his son, William Hamilton, who leased it for use as the vice-president's house during the years that the city was the temporary capital of the United States.

== Early life ==
Hamilton was believed to be born in the Kingdom of Scotland in approximately 1676. Hamilton did not talk about his parentage, career, or name in the Old World. At one time he was called Trent, although he returned to his name of Andrew when Queen Anne came to the throne in 1702.

== Career ==
About 1697, Hamilton immigrated to Accomac County, Virginia in British America, where he continued his study of law and taught a classical school. He later found employment as steward of a plantation owned by Joseph Preeson, one of his former students. After Preeson's death in 1705, Hamilton continued working the Preeson estate.

On March 6, 1706, he married Preeson's widow Ann, daughter of Thomas and Susanna Denwood Brown, who were members of a prominent Quaker family. The marriage is said to have brought Hamilton influential connections, and he began to practice law.

Two years after his marriage, on March 26, 1708, Hamilton purchased from John Toads a 600-acre estate, known as "Henberry", on the north side of the Chester River in Kent County, Maryland. Millington, Maryland was later developed on Henberry's land. Hamilton also maintained a residence in Virginia, and drew clients from both colonial states.

In his address to the Pennsylvania Assembly in 1739, Hamilton spoke of "liberty, the love of which as it first drew me to, so it constantly prevailed on me to reside in this Province, tho' to the manifest prejudice of my fortune." Hamilton was probably his real name, but, for private reasons, he saw fit to discard it for a time, possibly due to his family's involvement of the Glorious Revolution and the Jacobite Rising of 1689.

=== Early career ===
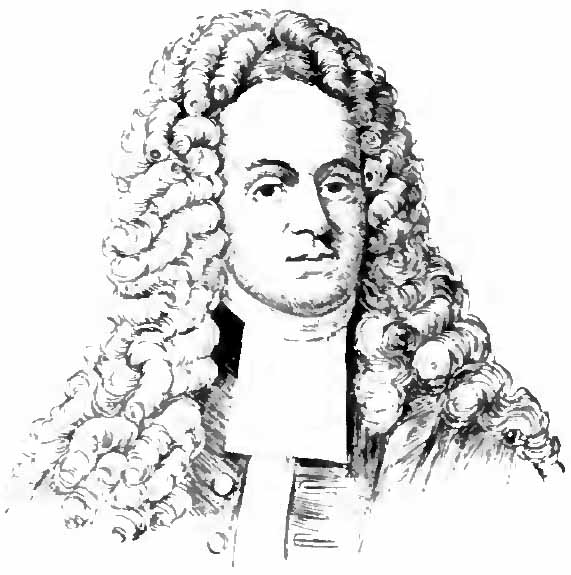
An 1892 illustration from Appletons' Cyclopædia of American Biography

By 1712, at age 36, Hamilton established a reputation in Chestertown, Maryland, with a lucrative law practice. That year, he traveled to London to gain prestige in his profession. On January 27, 1712, he joined Gray's Inn, one of London's four societies for barristers. Two weeks later on February 10, he was called before the English Bar. At the end of the year, during the winter of 1712/13, William Penn hired Hamilton in a replevin case against Berkeley Codd. Codd disputed some of Penn's rights under his grant from the Duke of York, who would later become King James II. This started the long and friendly relationship between Hamilton and the Penn family.

His trip to London and continued work in Pennsylvania, especially with the Penn family, gained Hamilton prominence. He came to the attention of both the Baltimore family and the government of the Maryland colony. In April 1715, he was chosen as a deputy to Maryland's House of Delegates from Kent County. As Hamilton was presenting cases before the Pennsylvania Supreme Court on April 29, 1715, he did not learn about his selection until his return to Maryland on May 5, 1715. Hamilton took the oath of office, test, and abjuration the day of his return. But, he was arrested by the House due to his delayed taking of the oath and reporting to the House. They accepted his explanation that he was 100 miles from his home in Chestertown and unable to return because of business, but he had to pay a 65-shilling fine to officials.

Placed on the Committee of Laws, Hamilton was charged with the organization and codification of the Maryland colony's judiciary laws. By May 14, 1715, Hamilton had helped put together a series of laws that became the Act of 1715. This Act would form the basis of the law for Maryland until the Revolution.

At some point during 1715, Hamilton moved to Philadelphia. He and his family occupied Clark Hall, owned by William Clark Jr. and Rebecca Clark, and managed by their relative Clement Plumsted. It was located at the corner of Third and Chestnut Streets.

=== Philadelphia lawyer ===
On September 7, 1717, Hamilton was appointed as attorney-general of Pennsylvania by Governor William Keith. In March 1721, he was called to the provincial council, and he accepted on condition that his duties should not interfere with his practice. Hamilton resigned the office in 1724; that year he traveled to London to oversee the formal approval of William Penn's will on behalf of the Penn family.

When a settler named Cartledge killed a Seneca man in 1722 in an area outside the boundaries of Philadelphia County, tension rose between the tribes in the area and the colonists. Colonists feared the Seneca would cause violence unless Cartledge could be brought to trial. A new Court Act was deemed necessary and created under the supervision of Hamilton, as Attorney-General, and the Chief Justice, David Lloyd. Lloyd's older laws were consolidated into the Judiciary Act of 1722, which was passed by Governor Keith on May 22, 1722. One feature allowed the Chief Justice to act as a justice of the peace anywhere in the colony if conditions called for it, a clear response to the Cartledge situation. As the murdered man was a Seneca, colonists feared the powerful Iroquois Confederacy might retaliate against the colonists for his death. Lloyd prepared to prosecute Cartledge. But the Iroquois wrote to Lloyd on July 30, 1722, urging that Cartledge be forgiven. At once the Assembly ordered one hundred pounds set aside for expenses and one hundred pounds for gifts. They authorized Hamilton as Attorney-General, Judge Hill, and a Mr. Norris to be a committee to visit the Five Nations.

In 1727, Hamilton was appointed prothonotary of the Supreme Court, Master of the Rolls, and Recorder of Philadelphia. He was elected to the Pennsylvania Provincial Assembly from Bucks County in the same year, chosen speaker in 1729, and re-elected annually until his retirement in 1739, with the exception of a single year, 1733.

==== Zenger case ====
The crowning glory of Hamilton's career was his defense of John Peter Zenger in 1735, which he undertook pro bono. Zenger was a printer in New York City. In his newspaper, Zenger had asserted that judges were arbitrarily displaced, and new courts were erected, without the consent of the legislature, by which trials by jury were taken away when a governor was so disposed. The attorney-general charged him with the crime of seditious libel, and Zenger's lawyers James Alexander and William Smith, objecting to the legality of the judge's commissions, were stricken from the list of attorneys. At this point, no New York attorneys could take the case. The merchant Mary Spratt Alexander suggested to her husband James Alexander that he ask his colleague Andrew Hamilton whom he was in regular correspondence with – and who was outside of the reach of influence by the judge – to come to New York to defend Zenger. Mary Alexander then traveled to Philadelphia to interview Hamilton and provide him with the facts of the case. It is thought that she and her husband were early investors of the New York Weekly Gazette.

Hamilton feared that the advocate, who had subsequently been appointed by the court, might be overawed by the bench, at the head of which was Chief Justice De Lancey, a member of the governor's council. He voluntarily went to New York and appeared in the case on Zenger's behalf. He admitted that Zenger had printed and published the article but advanced the doctrine, novel at the time, that the truth of the facts in the alleged libel could be set up as a defense. He said that in this proceeding, the jury were judges of both the law and the facts.

The offer of evidence to prove the truth of Zenger's statements was rejected, but Hamilton appealed to the jury to find or acknowledge from the evidence of their daily lives that the contents of the defendant's article were true. He argued that the definition of criminal libel, which didn't require the accusations to be false, came from the hated Star Chamber. His eloquence secured a verdict of "not guilty".

The people of New York and the other colonies hailed the verdict with delight, since it insured free discussion of the public conduct of public officials. Gouverneur Morris referred to Hamilton as "the day-star of the American Revolution." The common council of New York passed a resolution thanking him for his services, and presented him with the freedom of the city. In addition, a group of prominent residents contributed to the production of a 5½-ounce gold box that was presented to Hamilton as a lasting mark of their gratitude to him. His fame spread to England, an account of the trial passing through four editions there within three months.

==== Later career ====
On May 12, 1732, Thomas Penn, John Penn and Richard Penn, as the proprietors of Pennsylvania, signed an order to create a commission. This order was directed to prominent figures in the colonial Province of Pennsylvania and Philadelphia, including Hamilton, as well as Governor Gordon, Isaac Norris, Samuel Preston, and James Logan, Esquires, and to the gentlemen James Steel and Robert Charles. The commission, which was to be made up of at least three or more of these individuals, was given full power on behalf of the proprietors for the "running, marking, and laying out" of any boundary between Pennsylvania and Maryland. This was in accordance to the agreement signed between the Penn brothers and Charles Calvert, 5th Baron Baltimore on May 10, 1732.

From 1736 to his death in 1741, Hamilton was the mentor of young Benjamin Chew, who later became Attorney General and Chief Justice of Pennsylvania. Hamilton was for many years a trustee of the general loan-office, the province's agency for issuing paper money. In 1737 he was appointed judge of the vice-admiralty court by Deputy Governor George Thomas, the only office he held at the time of his death.

=== Independence Hall ===
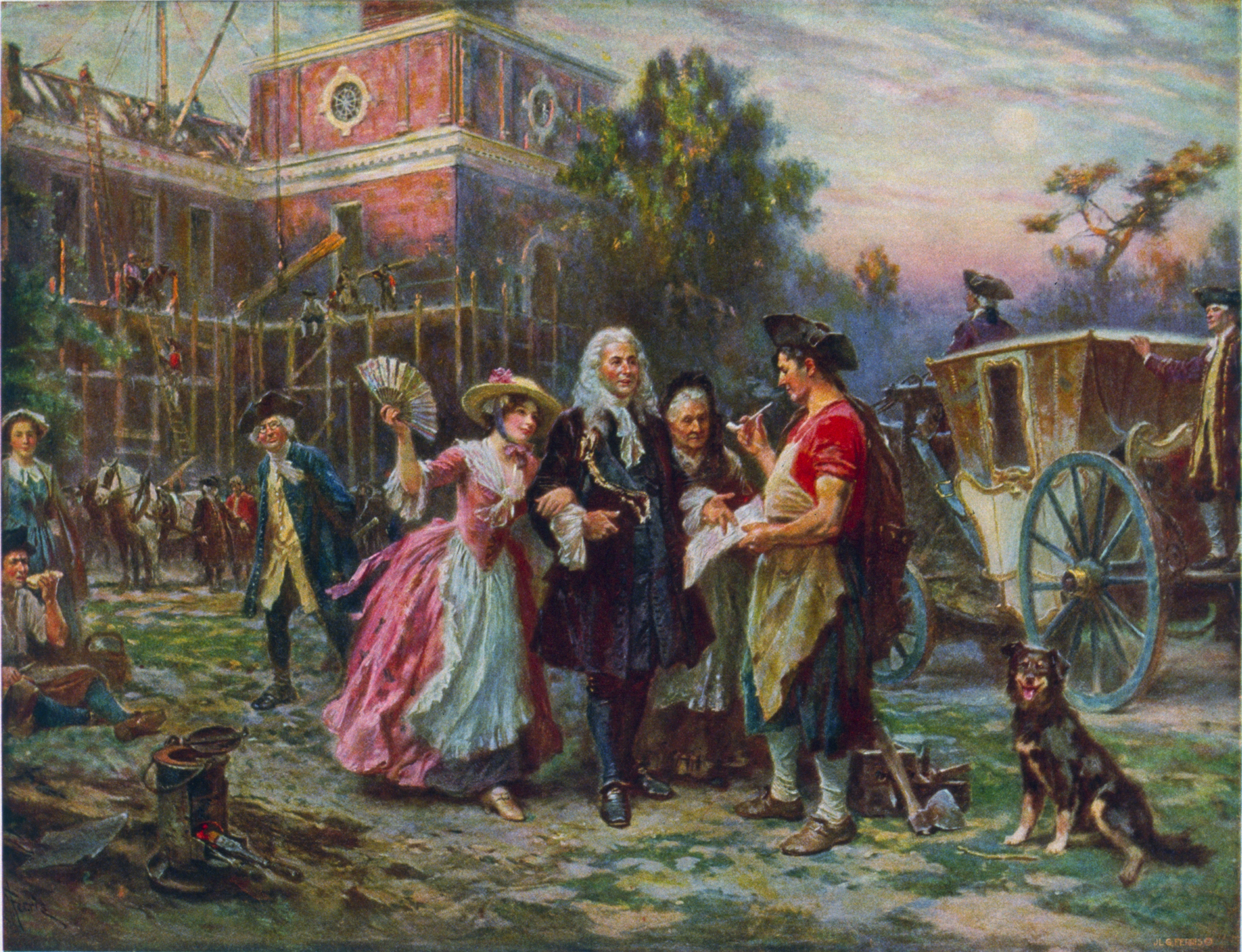
Building the Cradle of Liberty, by Jean Leon Gerome Ferris. Andrew Hamilton (center), with two women on his arms, discusses construction plans with a foreman during the construction of Independence Hall (shown in the background).

By Spring 1729, the citizens of Philadelphia were petitioning to erect a state house. A sum of two thousand pounds was raised for the proposal. Andrew Hamilton, along with Thomas Lawrence and John Kearsley, were appointed to a committee to decide upon plans for the building, select a site for construction, and hire contractors. Hamilton, in company with his son-in-law, William Allen, purchased the ground now known as Independence Square, whereon to erect "a suitable building" to be used as a legislative hall. Prior to 1729, the assembly met in a private residence.

Hamilton is often credited for the design of Independence Hall in Philadelphia, which was then known as the Pennsylvania State House. It is more likely that his designs were for initial planning and that he did not create the final plans. Beginning in 1732, Edmund Woolley was responsible for the final design and construction of the Pennsylvania State House, a project that employed Woolley and his apprentices well into the 1750s. The statehouse was not completed until after Hamilton's death, and the conveyance of the land to the province was made by his son and son-in-law.

=== Bush Hill, The Woodlands, and Lancaster County ===
Bush Hill. The Seat of Wm. Hamilton Esqr. near Philadelphia, by James Peller Malcolm. Bush Hill was first the country seat of his ancestor Andrew Hamilton.

For his legal work formalizing William Penn's will in London from 1724 to 1726, Hamilton was awarded land in 1726 and 1729 by the Pennsylvania proprietors; William Penn's widow Hannah Penn and sons, Richard Penn, Thomas Penn, and John Penn. Hamilton also took this time to purchase from Stephen Jackson a portion of land from the Springettsburg Manor. These gifts and purchases added up to 153 acres of land, for which Hamilton received a patent in 1734.

The Bush Hill estate contained the land now bound by 12th Street to the East, 19th Street to the West, Vine Street to the South, and what is now Fairmount Avenue (but was once Coates Street) to the North. The manor was located on what is now the southern side of Spring Garden Street near the old Philadelphia Mint building, which is now used by the Community College of Philadelphia. Hamilton left the estate to his son James Hamilton after his death; he in turn passed it on to his nephew William Hamilton.

When the federal capital was located in Philadelphia, Bush Hill was rented to the government as the house of the vice-president, as William Hamilton was on an extended stay in England. During the Yellow Fever Epidemic of 1793, its outbuildings were adapted for use for several months as a fever hospital.

The Woodlands was a large area of land given to Hamilton; it was situated on the west side of the Schuylkill River and his property included much of present-day West Philadelphia. He left it to his son Andrew, who survived him by only six years. The next to inherit and use the land was the younger Andrew Hamilton's son, William Hamilton.

Hamilton and his son James were among the founders of Lancaster, which in 1729 became the fourth county in the province of Pennsylvania. The community was located on a 500-acre (2 km^{2}) tract owned by Hamilton, on which he laid out Lancaster Townstead around 1730. By 1734, James, now proprietor of Lancaster town, won a seat in the Assembly and became the political leader of the county. In 1742 James Hamilton secured the original charter of government, which gave the settlement the status of borough (this charter can be found today in the city clerk's office).

== Later life ==
Hamilton's wife Anne is believed to have died around the year 1736. Hamilton died at his country seat of Bush Hill and was at first buried on that property. After the sale of his estate in the 1800s, Hamilton and the remains of his family were moved and reinterred in a mausoleum located at Christ Church. On August 6, two days after Hamilton's death, Benjamin Franklin published in his Pennsylvania Gazette an editorial of appreciation for the attorney and politician.

== Family and descendants ==
Coat of Arms of Andrew Hamilton

During the early years after his marriage, his wife Anne had several children. Margaret Hamilton, their first child, was born in 1709. Circa 1711, Hamilton's second child and first son James Hamilton was born; he went on to become a mayor of Philadelphia and a governor of the Pennsylvania colony. The Hamilton Watch Company was named after Andrew Hamilton, the owner of the Hamilton Watch Complex site in Lancaster. In 1713, Hamilton's last son, also named Andrew Hamilton, was born.

On February 16, 1734, Margaret Hamilton married William Allen, a mayor of Philadelphia who founded Allentown, Pennsylvania. William and Margaret had six children together. Andrew Hamilton had a close working relationship with his son-in-law. They both worked in the Philadelphia and Pennsylvania governments. Along with James Hamilton, they acquired the land for the state house, now Independence Hall, and its surrounding yard.

Andrew Hamilton the younger married Mary Till on December 24, 1741. She was the daughter of William Till, a businessman of the landed gentry in Pennsylvania and Delaware, and Mary Till, née Lillingston, the step-granddaughter of Berkeley Codd. He was the attorney in Delaware whom the elder Andrew Hamilton faced in court in 1712. Andrew Hamilton II and Mary Till Hamilton had two sons, Andrew and William Hamilton.

== Legacy ==
The Hamilton Watch Company, founded in Lancaster in 1892, was named after him.

During World War II, a Liberty ship was commissioned the SS Andrew Hamilton in Hamilton's honor.
