= James Hamilton (Pennsylvania politician) =

American politician (1710–1783)

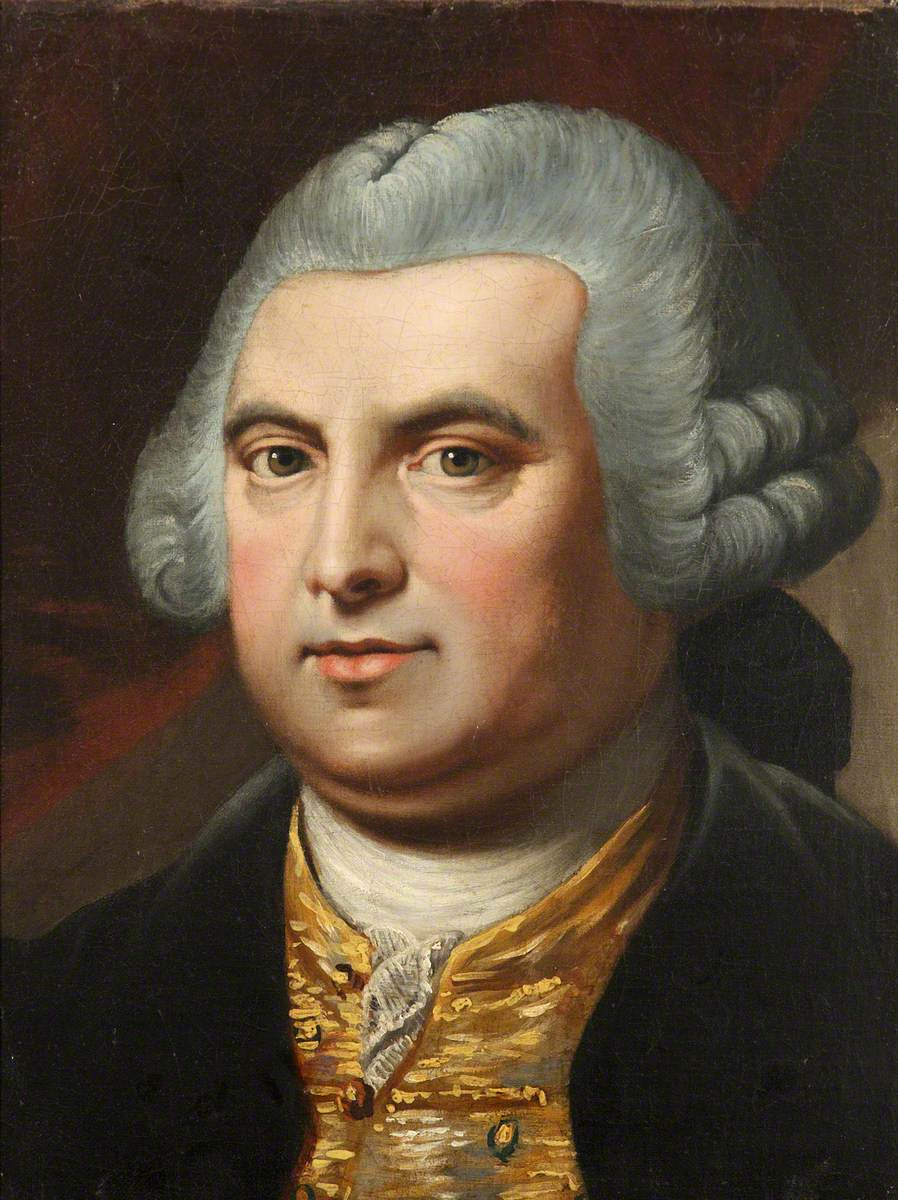
- A portrait of Hamilton, c. 1750s

Acting Governor of the Province of Pennsylvania
- In office 19 July – 30 August 1773

President of the Pennsylvania Provincial Council
- In office 4 May – 16 October 1771

Deputy Governor of the Province of Pennsylvania
- In office October 1759 – November 1763
- In office 23 November 1748 – 3 October 1754

Member of the Pennsylvania Provincial Council
- In office 1746–1747

Mayor of Philadelphia
- In office 1745–1746

Member of the Pennsylvania Provincial Assembly
- In office 1735–1740

Personal details
- Born: 1710 Philadelphia, Province of Pennsylvania, British America
- Died: August 14, 1783 (aged 72–73) New York City, Province of New York, British America
- Occupation: Lawyer, politician

James Hamilton (1710 – August 14, 1783), son of the British-born lawyer Andrew Hamilton who was active in the Thirteen Colonies, was also a lawyer and governmental figure in colonial Philadelphia and Pennsylvania. He served two terms as deputy governor of the Province of Pennsylvania from 1748 to 1754 and from 1759 to 1763. From 1745 to 1747, he was the mayor of Philadelphia.

== Early life and education ==
Coat of Arms of James Hamilton

Hamilton was born in Philadelphia in 1710, in what was then the colonial-era Province of Pennsylvania. He was educated in Philadelphia and England before becoming a practicing lawyer in 1731. Hamilton was a freemason and succeeded Benjamin Franklin as Provincial Grand Master for Pennsylvania in 1735.

== Career ==
=== Supreme Court of Pennsylvania ===
On December 28, 1733, his father resigned as prothonotary of the Supreme Court of Pennsylvania, and Hamilton was appointed to the office.

In May 1734, James's father, Andrew Hamilton, sold him the town that is present-day Lancaster, Pennsylvania, for 5 shillings. Later that month, on May 21, the younger Hamilton secured a patent from the Penn family for his grant on the Lancaster land.

After the death of his father on August 4, 1741, Hamilton inherited his 150-acre estate known as Bush Hill north of the city. He assisted his brother-in-law William Allen in the administration of lands purchased by his father to be used for the state house and surrounding public space.

=== Pennsylvania Provincial Assembly ===
Hamilton was a member of the provincial assembly from 1735 to 1740.

=== Mayor of Philadelphia ===
He served as mayor of Philadelphia for one year from 1745 to 1746. During his tenure as Philadelphia mayor, Hamilton kept a record of servants and apprentices bound before him, which historians have used to gauge the nature and extent of indentured servitude in Philadelphia and Pennsylvania since Philadelphia was then an entry-point for indentured servants entering the Province of Pennsylvania from Europe.

=== Lieutenant governor of the Province of Pennsylvania ===
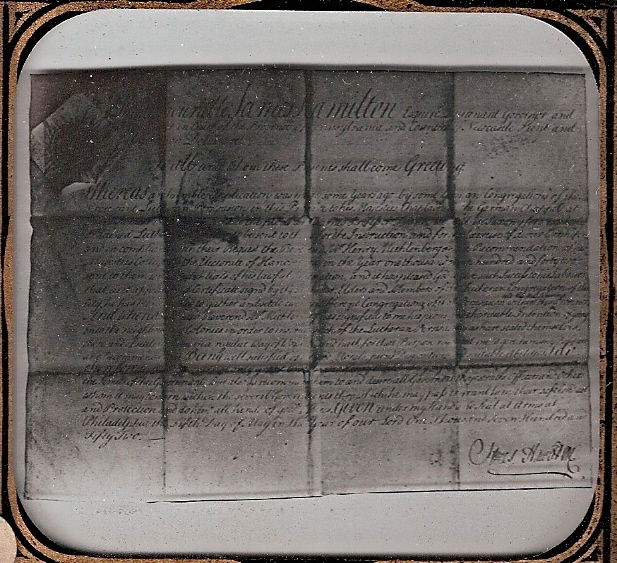
Henry Muhlenberg's passport, issued by Hamilton in 1752

Bush Hill the seat of William Hamilton Esq. near Philadelphia, a portrait by James Peller Malcolm; Bush Hill was the country residence of Andrew Hamilton, which he later passed on to his son, James

Hamilton became a member of the provincial council in 1746. He was commissioned by the sons of William Penn to serve as lieutenant governor of the Province of Pennsylvania, serving in that capacity until 1754, then again from 1759 to 1763, and briefly in 1771 and 1773.

On September 13, 1761, Hamilton and William Allen conveyed Lot no. 1 and the other pieces of property obtained by Andrew Hamilton and Allen to Isaac Norris II and the other trustees in charge of purchasing property for the Philadelphia State House, which was later renamed Independence Hall. The conveyance of this land completed the area of the yard: property that contained the state house and the public spaces surrounding it.

During the period when Philadelphia was the federal capital of the United States, prior to its relocation to Washington, D.C., in 1800, Hamilton was on an extended stay in England. He rented Bush Hill to the federal government for residential use by the vice president.

Hamilton was visiting London in 1748, when he received the commission of deputy governor for the province from the Penns. Upon his return to Philadelphia, Hamilton faced unrest from the Native American population. Their territory north of the Blue Mountain, west of the Susquehanna River, was being encroached upon by settlers illegally. Hamilton authorized Richard Peters and Conrad Weiser to assist in removing these squatters after the provision in the Land Purchase of 1749, which authorized their removal by force if necessary.

Other issues Hamilton confronted included:

- Encroachment of the French Military into forts in the land of the Pennsylvania Charter at Presque Isle, Venango, La Boeuf and Du Quesne.
- Organizing and funding a defense against the French in opposition to the pacifist Quaker element in the Assembly
- Friction between the Assembly and Proprietors on taxing Proprietary land holdings
- Assembly discontent over the Proprietors' refusal to hear appeals from them about the Deputy Governor's decisions
- Failure to disclose to the Assembly, the Proprietors' directive concerning the financial interest of pecuniary bills which Hamilton would approve
- Albany Congress attended by John Penn and Benjamin Franklin, who proposed a colonial union for defense against the French and Indians

Hamilton resigned due to his deteriorating relations with the Assembly in the attempt to follow the proprietors' instructions.

Hamilton's second turn as deputy governor followed the recall of William Denny. The French and Indian War was coming to its conclusion. However, the Province of Pennsylvania was then facing Pontiac's War. The Lenape and Shawnee tribes raided deep into frontier Pennsylvania, taking captives and killing settlers. An uprising led by a vigilante group, known as the Paxton Boys, erupted in Province of Pennsylvania. Hamilton was replaced by John Penn, William Penn's grandson.

=== President of Provincial Council ===
Hamilton assumed the role of chief executive from May 4 to October 16, 1771, when John Penn left Philadelphia to return to England when his father died.

The council was prohibited to approve any act of the Assembly so the role was strictly ceremonial or administrative until October when Richard Penn, Jr., (John's brother) was appointed as the province's deputy governor. Hamilton was acting governor of the Pennsylvania Province from July 19 to August 30, 1773.

== Death ==
Hamilton died in New York City on August 14, 1783, at age 72 or 73.

== Legacy ==
He was active in founding several institutions in Philadelphia, serving as president of the board of trustees of the College of Philadelphia, which is now the University of Pennsylvania, and as the head of the American Philosophical Society.

Since Hamilton did not have a surviving son, his nephew William Hamilton inherited his estate at Bush Hill. During the 1793 Philadelphia yellow fever epidemic, the Bush Hill estate was adapted for several months for use as a yellow fever hospital.

Hamilton Street, a main thoroughfare in the Center City section of Allentown, Pennsylvania, is named in Hamilton's honor. Hamilton's brother-in-law, William Allen, founded the city in 1762.

== See also ==
- List of colonial governors of Pennsylvania

Preceded by Edward Shippen (II)	Mayor of Philadelphia; 1745–1746	Succeeded by William Attwood
