= Philadelphia lawyer =

Informal legal term

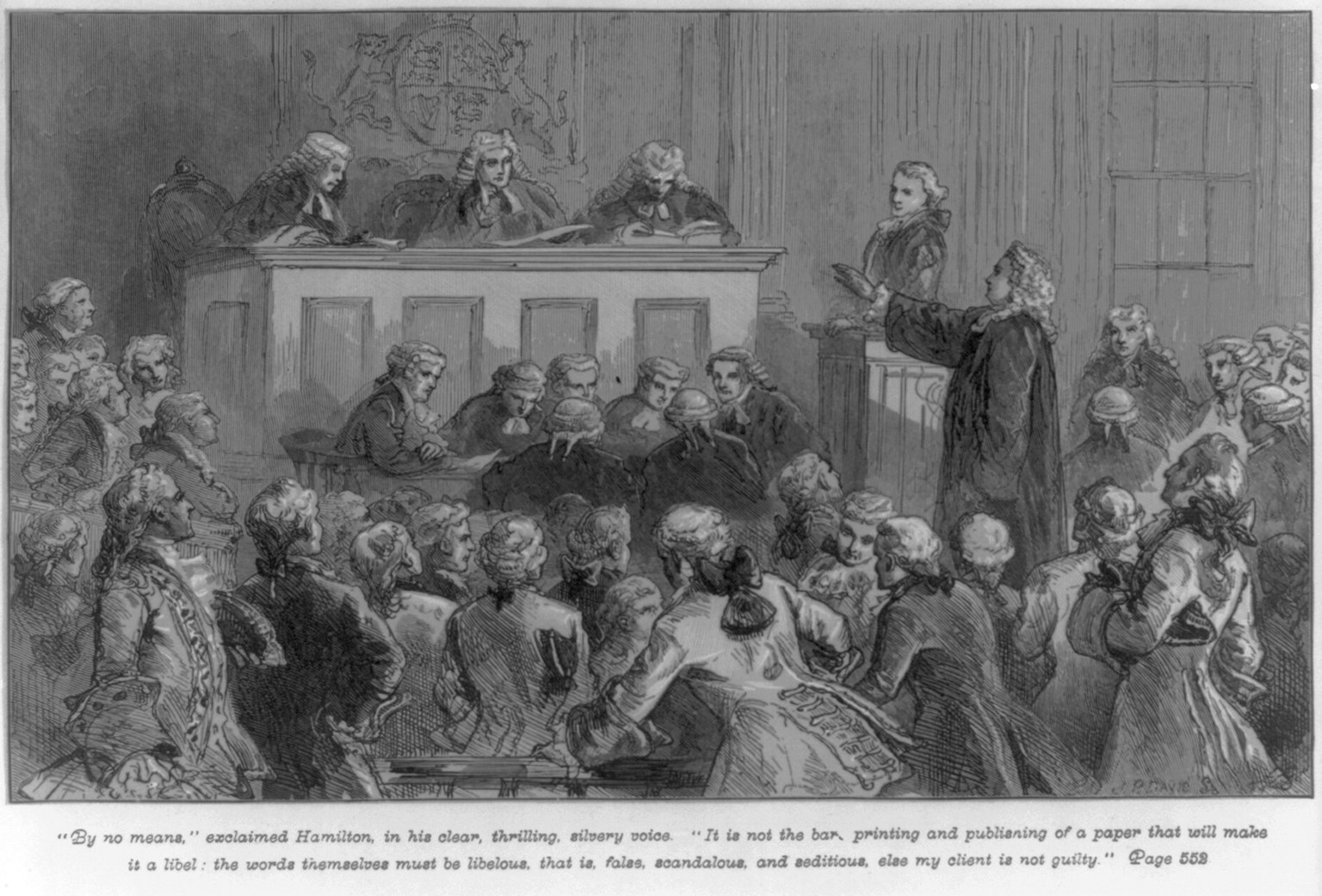
An illustration of Andrew Hamilton defending John Peter Zenger in the 1730s

“Philadelphia lawyer” is a term to describe a lawyer who knows the most detailed and minute points of law or is an exceptionally competent lawyer. Its first known usage dates back to 1788.

Philadelphia-based Colonial American lawyer Andrew Hamilton, a lawyer best known for his legal victory on behalf of printer and newspaper publisher John Peter Zenger, is believed to have inspired the "Philadelphia lawyer" term. This 1735 decision helped to establish that truth is a defense to an accusation of libel.

== In popular culture ==
- The Woody Guthrie song "Philadelphia Lawyer" is based on a Philadelphia lawyer who ventures west, falls in love with a Hollywood starlet in Reno, and tries to woo her away from her husband.
- New Zealand politician Winston Peters is known to refer to members of the press, such as Jack Tame, as a "Philadelphia lawyer" implying a negative connotation for being tricky and catching onto minute things.

== See also ==
- Philadelphia (film), a legal drama
