= Edmund Woolley =

English-born American architect

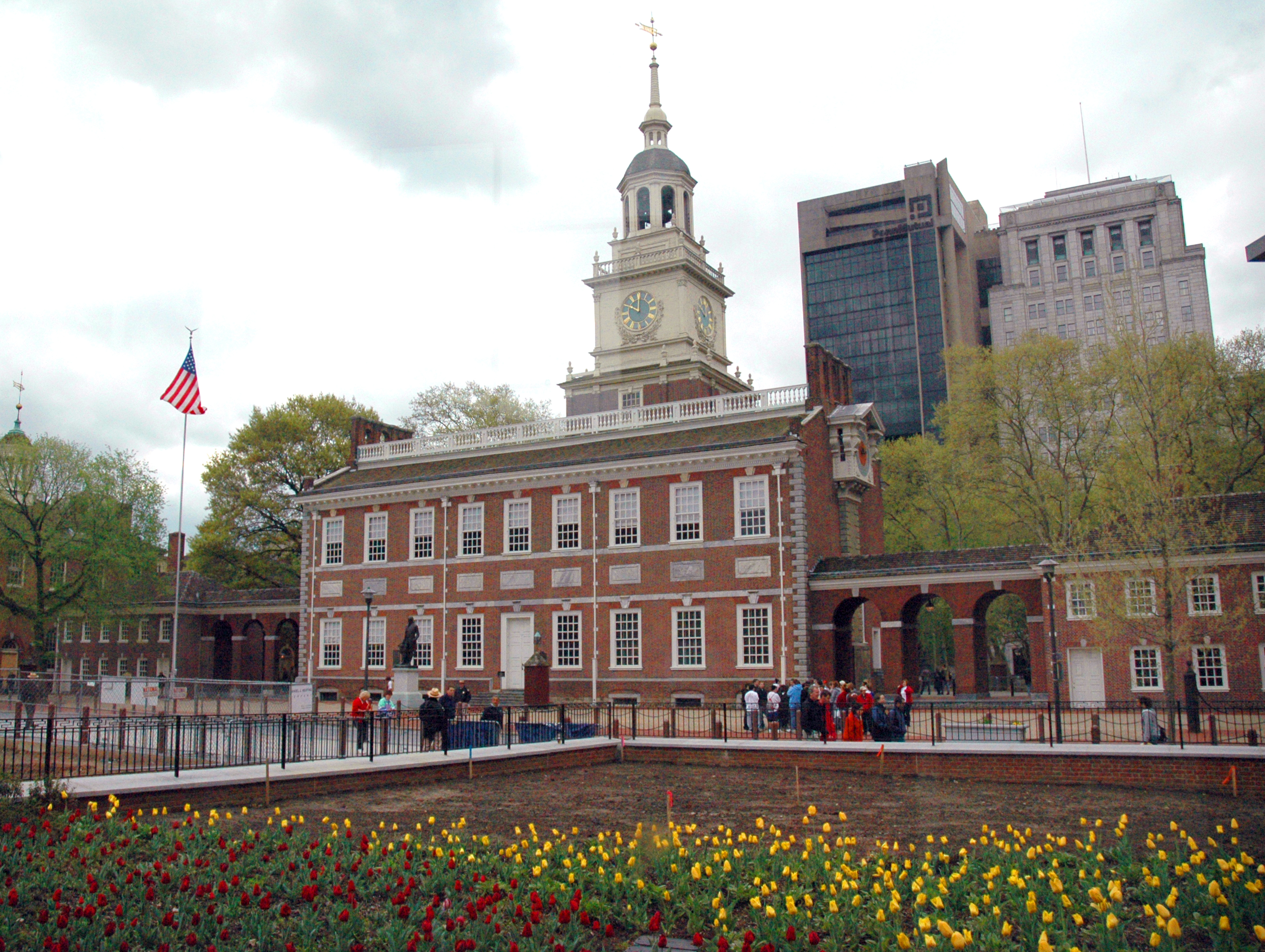
Woolley designed and built Independence Hall, although it is often attributed to Andrew Hamilton

Edmund Woolley (c.1695 – 1771) was an English-born American architect and master carpenter, best known for building Independence Hall in Philadelphia, Pennsylvania, United States.

== Biography ==
Woolley was born in England around 1695, and emigrated to the Thirteen Colonies as a child, around 1705. It is not known with whom he apprenticed or where he learned his trade. He was one of the first members of the Carpenters' Company of the City and County of Philadelphia.

=== Independence Hall, 1732–1748 and 1750–1753 ===
In 1732, he began construction of the Pennsylvania State House, later renamed Independence Hall. Credit for the building's design has often been given to Andrew Hamilton, but modern scholarship argues that he contributed little to the project. A surviving 1735 receipt lists a £5 payment to Woolley for "drawing drafts," "fronts" (elevations) and "Plans of the first and Second floors of the State House." The building took 14 years for Woolley and his workers, who included Ebenezer Tomlinson and Thomas Nevell, to complete. The interior woodwork was carved by Samuel Harding and Bryan Wilkinson.

The second floor featured meeting rooms and a banquet hall the width of the building. The original stairway proved inadequate for so large a building. In 1750, Woolley laid the foundations for a brick tower to house a grand staircase and support a wooden steeple. The tower's exterior was completed in 1753, but Hardings's interior woodwork was not completed until 1756. The bell ordered for the tower in 1751, is now known as the Liberty Bell.

=== Whitefield Meeting House, 1740 ===
Woolley designed and built the Whitefield Meeting House (1740, demolished), a Methodist church and charity school named for preacher George Whitefield. Its 70-by-100 foot (21 x 30.5 m), 2 1/2-story building at 4th & Arch Streets was the largest building in the American Colonies – larger than the then-under-construction Pennsylvania State House.

The charity school struggled financially. On the recommendation of Benjamin Franklin, the building was purchased in 1749 for use by what became the Academy of Philadelphia (1751). Several years later, the academy was granted a Royal charter to establish a college, the College of Philadelphia (1755). The academy and college are predecessors of the University of Pennsylvania.

The Whitefield Meeting House was demolished by 1845.

=== Hope Lodge, 1743–1748 ===
Woolley was responsible for design and construction of the Whitemarsh Estate (today known as Hope Lodge). The Georgian country mansion was built by Quaker businessman Samuel Morris in what is now Fort Washington, Pennsylvania.

== Selected works ==
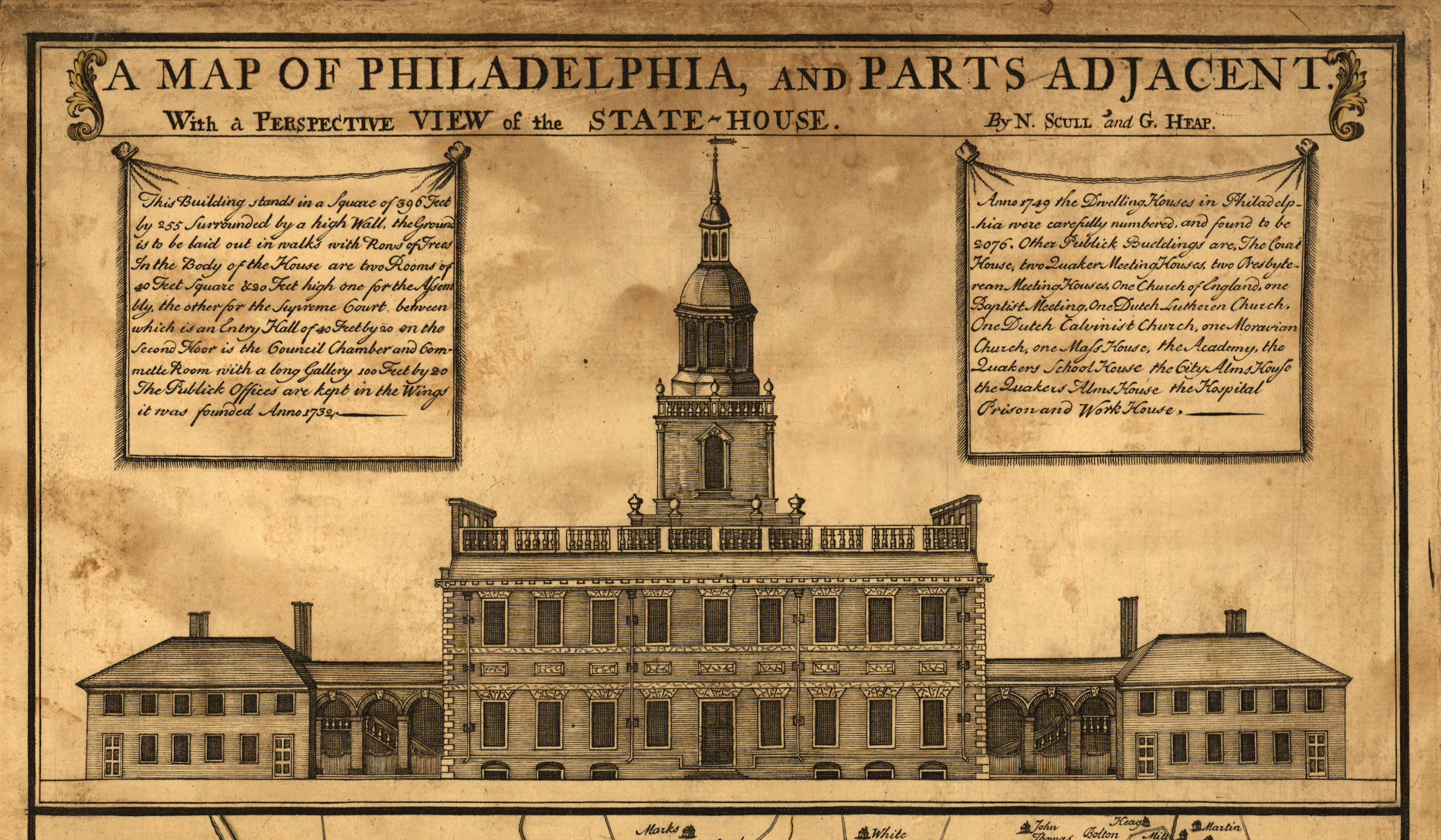
1752 engraving of the Pennsylvania State House

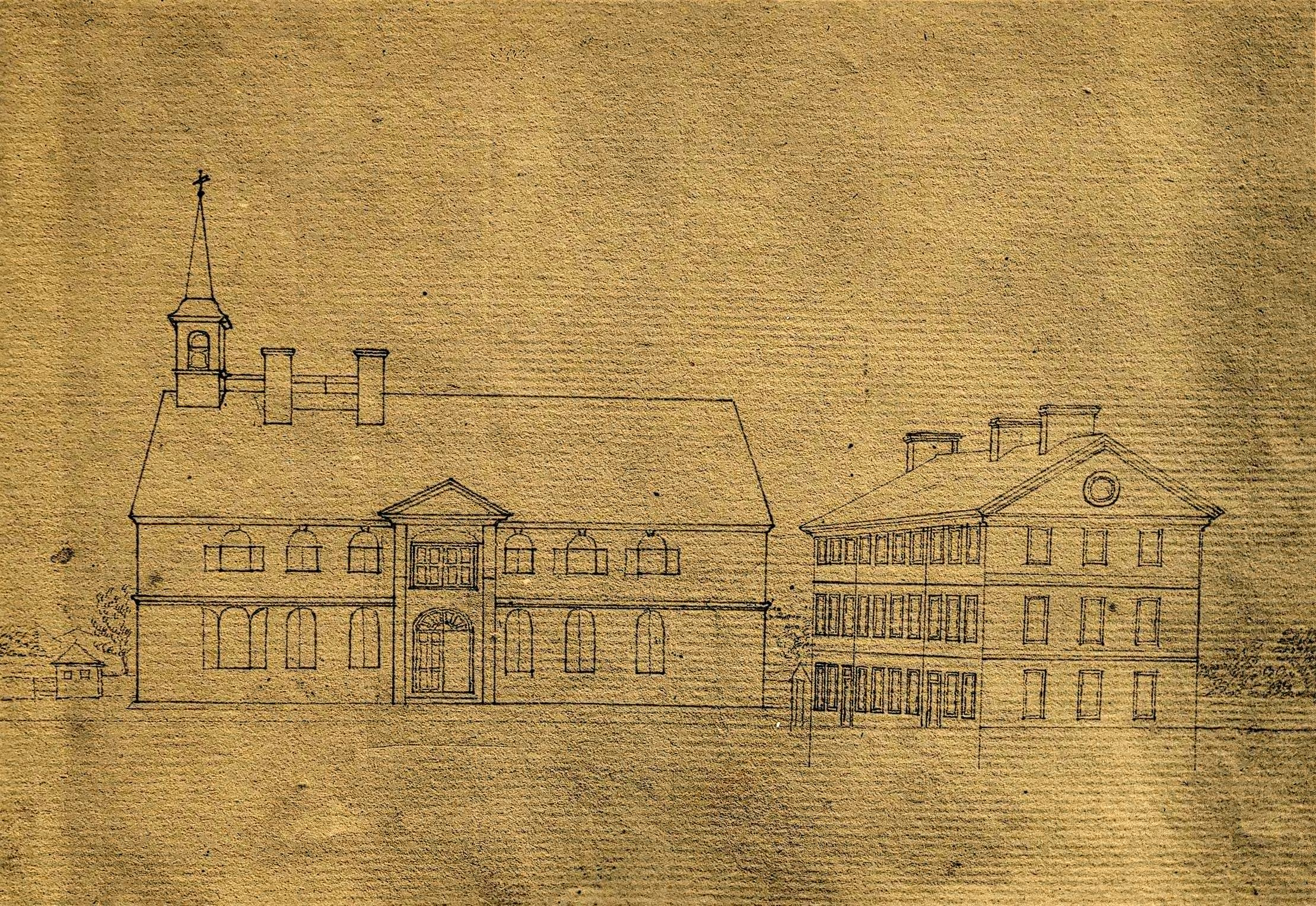
Academy and College of Philadelphia (ca. 1780). Sketch by Pierre Du Simitière.

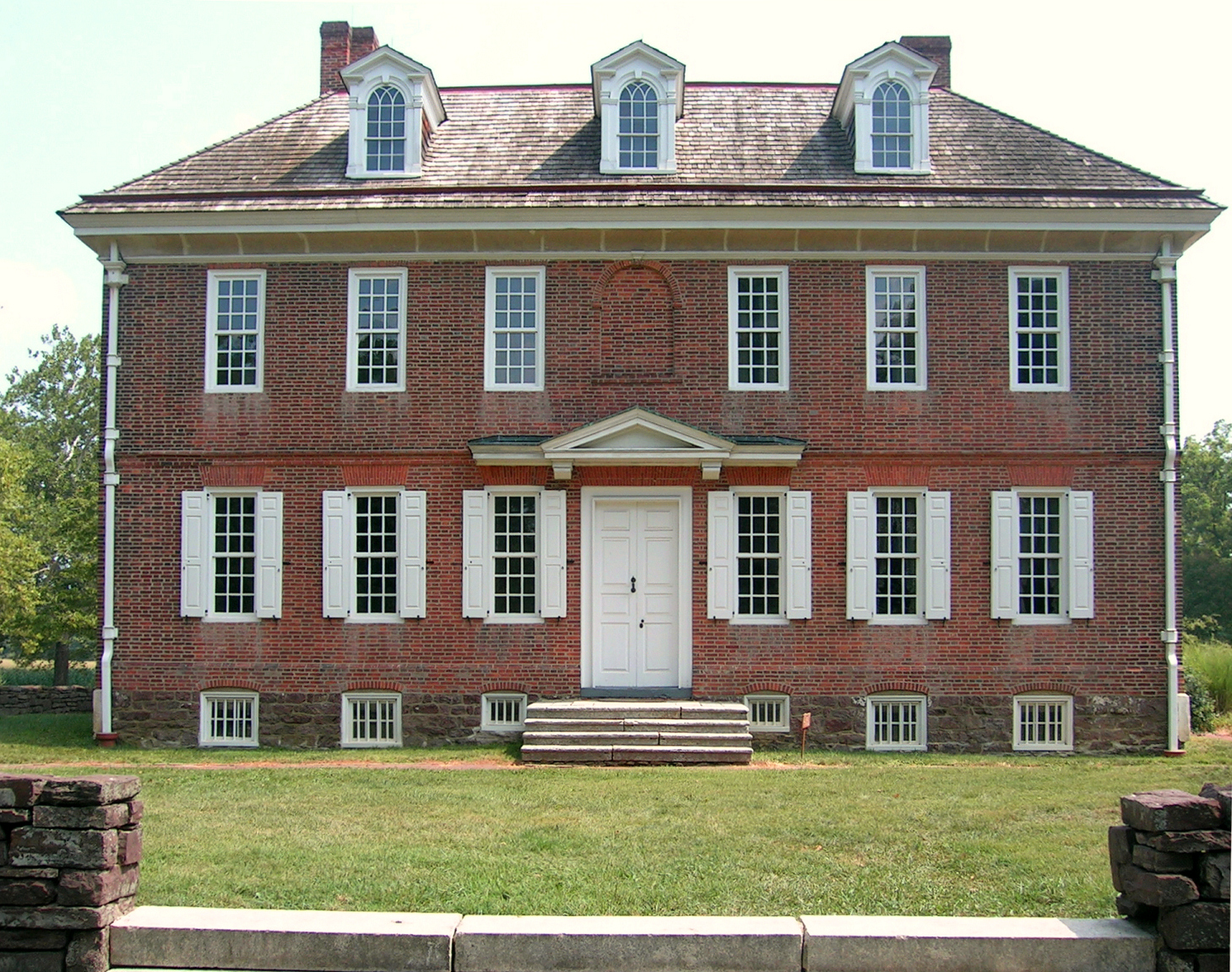
Hope Lodge
