= Three Tuns, Pennsylvania =

Unincorporated community in Pennsylvania, US

Three Tuns
- Unincorporated community
- Location of Three Tuns in Pennsylvania Three Tuns (the United States)
- Coordinates: 40°10′42″N 75°11′35″W
- Country: United States
- State: Pennsylvania
- County: Montgomery
- Township: Upper Dublin
- Elevation: 298 ft (91 m)
- Time zone: UTC-5 (EST)
  - Summer (DST): UTC-4 (EDT)
- Area codes: 215, 267 and 445

Three Tuns (also Three Tons) is an unincorporated community located in Montgomery County, Pennsylvania, United States. The community is in Upper Dublin Township, 2 miles (3.2 km) northeast of the Borough of Ambler and 3 miles (4.8 km) west of Horsham.

Three Tuns is located at the intersection of Butler Pike and Norristown Road, approximately .45 miles (0.72 km) southwest of Butler Pike's intersection with Pennsylvania Route 63 and approximately .53 miles (0.85 km) west of Norristown Road's intersection with Limekiln Pike.

Bean's 1884 History of Montgomery County, Pennsylvania describes Three Tuns as follows:

The village of Three Tons is situated in a fine fertile section of country, at the intersection of Norristown Rd and Butler Pike, the latter being turnpiked to Ambler, two and a half miles distant. It contains a store, hotel, school-house, several mechanic shops and five or six houses. The post-office was established here in 1858; T. G. Torbert, postmaster. The Union Library of Upper Dublin is kept here, over the store of E. T. Comly, and now contains about two thousand volumes. It was incorporated May 25, 1840; E. T. Comly, treasurer, and Ellie Teas, secretary and librarian. The Upper Dublin Horse Company, organized many years ago, holds its annual meetings here. Recent researches establish the fact that before 1722 a well traveled path led from Edward Farmar's mill, in Whitemarsh, through this place, to Richard Saunders' ferry, on the Neshaminy (now the village of Bridge Point, three miles south of Doylestown).
