= SS Andrew Hamilton =

Liberty ship of WWII

History

United States
- Name: Andrew Hamilton
- Namesake: Andrew Hamilton
- Owner: War Shipping Administration (WSA)
- Operator: International Freight Corp.
- Ordered: as type (EC2-S-C1) hull, MCE hull 57
- Awarded: 14 March 1941
- Builder: Bethlehem-Fairfield Shipyard, Baltimore, Maryland
- Cost: $1,078,710
- Yard number: 2044
- Way number: 11
- Laid down: 15 June 1942
- Launched: 6 August 1942
- Sponsored by: Mrs. J.E.P. Grant
- Completed: 17 August 1942
- Identification: Call sign: KGEY
- Fate: Laid up in the National Defense Reserve Fleet, Wilmington, North Carolina, 14 April 1948. Sold for scrapping, 9 April 1962, withdrawn from fleet, 11 May 1962

General characteristics
- Class & type: Liberty ship; type EC2-S-C1, standard
- Tonnage: 10,865 LT DWT; 7,176 GRT
- Displacement: 3,380 long tons (3,434 t) (light); 14,245 long tons (14,474 t) (max)
- Length: 441 feet 6 inches (135 m) oa; 416 feet (127 m) pp; 427 feet (130 m) lwl
- Beam: 57 feet (17 m)
- Draft: 27 ft 9.25 in (8.4646 m)
- Installed power: 2 × Oil fired 450 °F (232 °C) boilers, operating at 220 psi (1,500 kPa); 2,500 hp (1,900 kW)
- Propulsion: 1 × triple-expansion steam engine, (manufactured by Vulcan Iron Works, Wilkes-Barre, Pennsylvania); 1 × screw propeller
- Speed: 11.5 knots (21.3 km/h; 13.2 mph)
- Capacity: 562,608 cubic feet (15,931 m^{3}) (grain); 499,573 cubic feet (14,146 m^{3}) (bale)
- Complement: 38–62 USMM; 21–40 USNAG
- Armament: Varied by ship; Bow-mounted 3-inch (76 mm)/50-caliber gun; Stern-mounted 4-inch (102 mm)/50-caliber gun; 2–8 × single 20-millimeter (0.79 in) Oerlikon anti-aircraft (AA) cannons and/or, 2–8 × 37-millimeter (1.46 in) M1 AA guns

SS Andrew Hamilton was a Liberty ship built in the United States during World War II. She was named after Andrew Hamilton, a Scottish lawyer in the Thirteen Colonies, where he finally settled in Philadelphia. He was best known for his legal victory on behalf of the printer and newspaper publisher John Peter Zenger. This 1735 decision in New York helped to establish that truth is a defense to an accusation of libel. Hamilton, in company with his son-in-law, William Allen, purchased the ground, whereon to erect "a suitable building" to be used as a legislative hall, now known as Independence Hall.

== Construction ==
Andrew Hamilton was laid down on 15 June 1942, under a Maritime Commission (MARCOM) contract, MCE hull 57, by the Bethlehem-Fairfield Shipyard, Baltimore, Maryland; she was sponsored by Mrs. J.E.P. Grant, the wife of the chief of the engineering section, production division of MARCOM, in Washington DC, and was launched on 6 August 1942.

== History ==
She was allocated to International Freighting Corporation, on 17 August 1942. On 14 April 1948, she was laid up in the National Defense Reserve Fleet in Wilmington, North Carolina, and was sold for scrapping on 9 April 1962, to Horton Industries, Inc. for $59,399.89. She was withdrawn from the fleet on 11 May 1962.

== Bibliography ==
- "Bethlehem-Fairfield, Baltimore MD". www.ShipbuildingHistory.com. 14 August 2008.
- Maritime Administration. "Andrew Hamilton". Ship History Database Vessel Status Card. U.S. Department of Transportation, Maritime Administration.
- Davies, James (May 2004). "Specifications (As-Built)" (PDF). p. 23.
- "SS Andrew Hamilton".
