= Hope Lodge (Whitemarsh Township, Pennsylvania) =

Historic house in Pennsylvania, United States

Coordinates: 40.124996°N 75.216758°W

- U.S. National Register of Historic Places
- Pennsylvania state historical marker
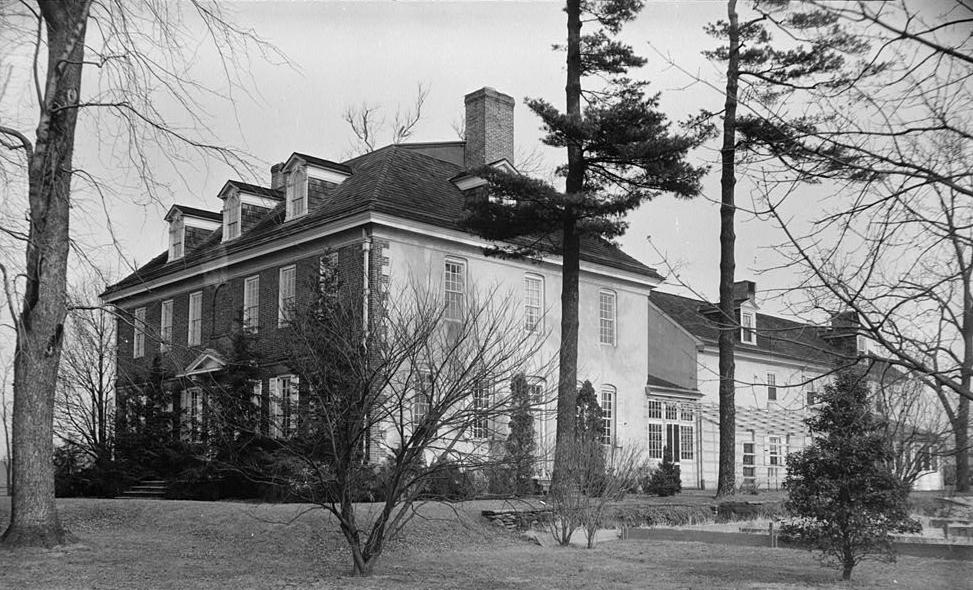
- Hope Lodge, circa 1937.

- Location within Pennsylvania Location within the United States
- Location: Fort Washington, Pennsylvania
- Built: 1750
- Architect: Edmund Woolley
- Architectural style: Georgian
- NRHP reference No.: 72001141

Significant dates
- Added to NRHP: April 26, 1972
- Designated PHMC: February 16, 1966

Hope Lodge is a historic building located at 553 South Bethlehem Pike in Fort Washington, Pennsylvania, in the United States. This mansion has been described as "one of the finest examples of Georgian Colonial architecture in this part of the country. It was used by Continental troops during the 1777 Philadelphia Campaign during the American Revolution.

Hope Lodge was listed on the U.S. National Register of Historic Places in 1972.

== History ==
Originally named "Whitemarsh Estate," Hope Lodge is a Georgian country mansion built between 1743 and 1748 by Quaker businessman Samuel Morris and designed by Philadelphia architect Edmund Woolley. The Pennsylvania guide noted in 1940 that Morris' English fiancée—for whom the Lodge was allegedly built—broke off the engagement after hearing that "Morris, in his cups, remarked: 'I have built the pen, now all I have to do is to go to England, get the sow, and start the litter.' He died a bachelor, leaving the estate to his brother Joshua." Upon Morris's death in 1770, his brother Joshua sold the property to William West, another Philadelphia merchant. During the autumn of 1777, Washington's Continental Army spent six weeks camped at nearby Whitemarsh. During the encampment, Hope Lodge was used as a hospital by George Washington's surgeon general John Cochran, and as quarters for Major General Nathanael Greene. When West died in 1784, the house was purchased by the English banker Henry Hope (to whom Adam Smith dedicated The Wealth of Nations and whose family would later own and lend their name to the Hope Diamond) and it was presented as a wedding gift to his ward, James Watmough. In 1832, the Watmough family sold the property to Jacob Wentz, their tenant farmer, and the Wentz family remained in residence at Hope Lodge for ninety years. In 1921, the property was sold to Keasbey and Mattison Company, who intended to demolish the home to expand a nearby limestone quarry. Hope Lodge was saved from destruction by William and Alice Degn, who purchased the property from Keasbey and Mattison in 1922. In 1957, ownership of the lodge was transferred to the Commonwealth of Pennsylvania.

Mather Mill is no longer part of the Hope Lodge property. The Commonwealth of Pennsylvania transferred ownership to a private owner in 2021.

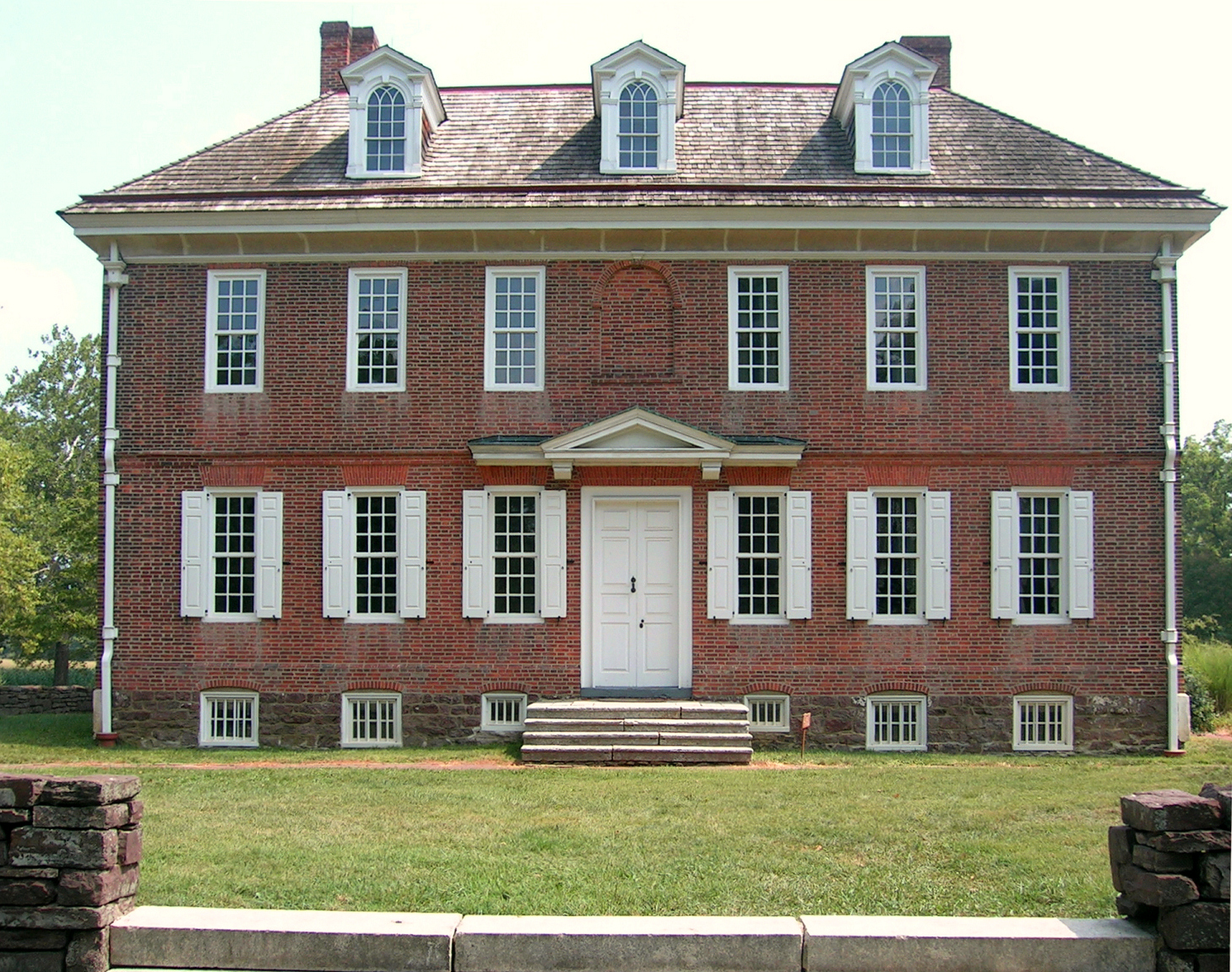
Hope Lodge (2006)

== Hope Lodge today ==
Hope Lodge was operated by the Pennsylvania Historical and Museum Commission as a museum and historic site. On November 20, 2009, the site was closed due to state budget constraints which reduced the agency's budget by 43%. This reduction resulted in mass layoff of PHMC employees, and the closure or reduction in hours and/or services at many PHMC-operated sites throughout the state of Pennsylvania. The site is now operated by the non-profit Friends of Hope Lodge who run daily operations at the site under a management agreement with the PHMC.

The Friends of Hope Lodge plays host to various community events, such as Ambler Symphony concerts; as well as an annual reenactment of the 1777 Whitemarsh Encampment. Tours of the interior of the building are available seasonally (April through October).

== Owners of Hope Lodge ==
- 1743 to 1770: Samuel Morris (1709-1770)
- 1770 to 1776: Joshua Morris
- 1776 to 1784: William and Mary West
- 1784 to 1832: Watmough Family
- 1832 to 1921: Wentz Family
- 1921 to 1922: Keasbey and Mattison Company
- 1922 to 1957: William and Alice Degn
- 1957 to Present: Pennsylvania Historical and Museum Commission

== See also ==
- Clifton House
