= Farmar Mill =

- U.S. National Register of Historic Places
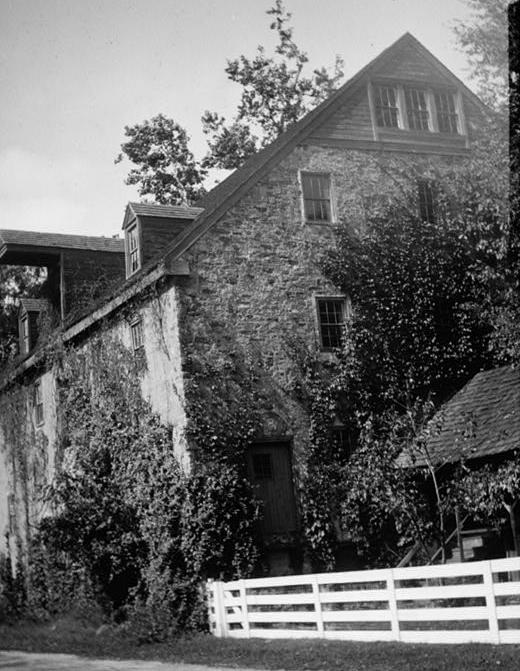
- Farmar Mill, circa 1936.

- Location within Pennsylvania Location within the United States
- Location: Fort Washington, Pennsylvania
- Coordinates: 40°7′26″N 75°13′10″W
- Built: ca. 1690
- NRHP reference No.: 72001140
- Added to NRHP: May 19, 1972

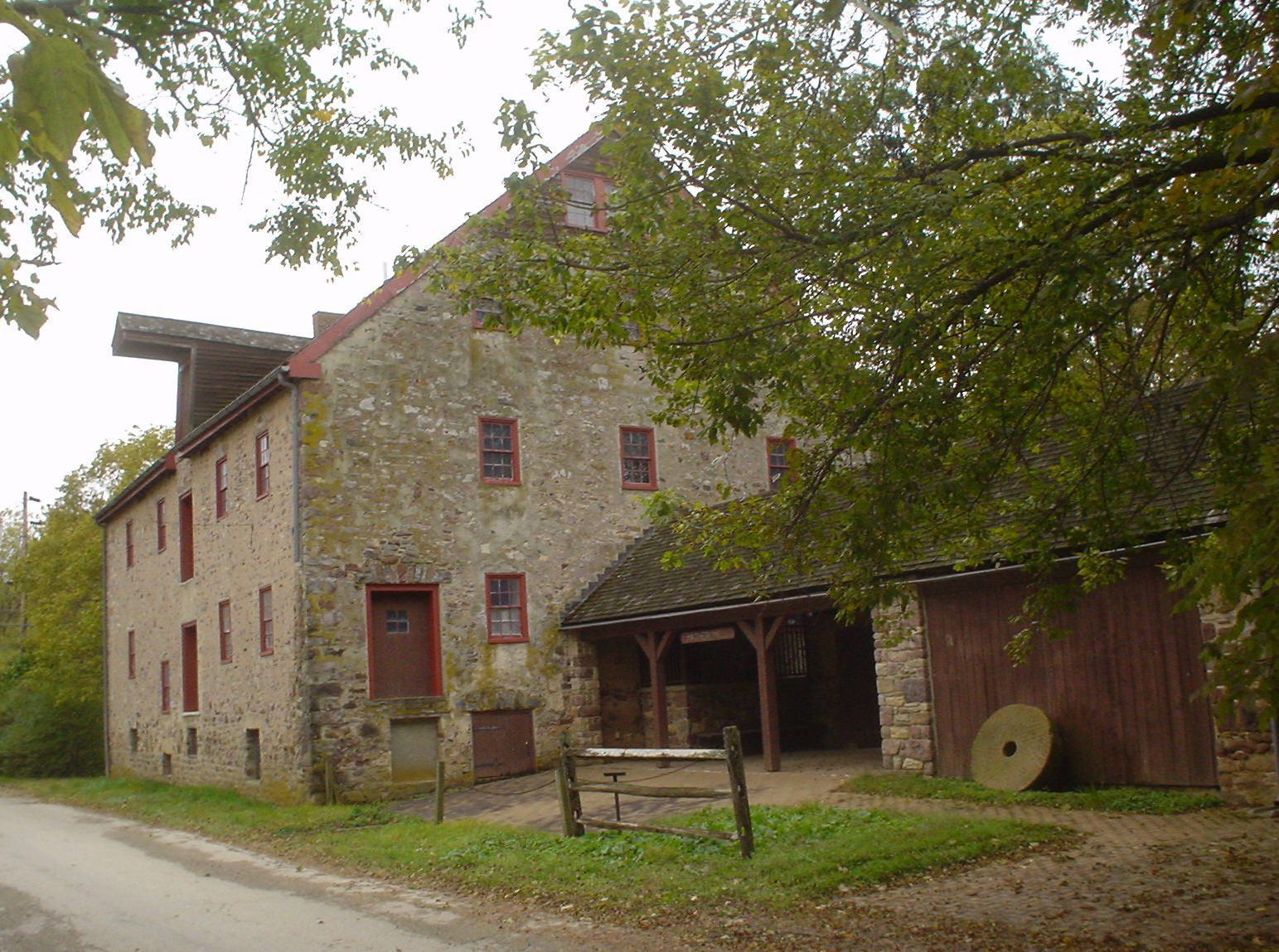
Farmar Mill in 2009

Farmar Mill, also known as Mathers Mill, is a historic mill building. The mill was powered by the Wissahickon Creek and is located on Mather's Lane near Skippack Pike (Pennsylvania Route 73), and just west of the historic Bethlehem Pike in the village of Whitemarsh (near Fort Washington), Pennsylvania, in the United States.

The water-powered gristmill was built around the year 1690 by Edward Farmar. Farmar's father was a British army officer living in Ireland who had purchased a 5,000-acre (2,000 ha) parcel of land in Pennsylvania from William Penn. This tract contained most of what is present-day Whitemarsh Township. Farmar's father died before he could move his family to America, but his mother brought the family to America in 1685, settling in the area of present-day Fort Washington.

Farmar Mill was the original terminus for Skippack Pike, which was established in 1713. By 1722, a road also existed from Farmar Mill, through the village of Three Tuns, to Richard Saunders' ferry, on the Neshaminy Creek (later the village of Bridge Point, now Edison) in Bucks County.

In 1740, Quaker businessman Samuel Morris bought a one-half interest in the mill, and bought the remaining half interest after Farmar's death in 1746. During the period of 1743 and 1748, Morris was building his country mansion "Whitemarsh Estate" (later known as Hope Lodge) a mere stone's throw from Farmar's Mill. After Morris' death in 1770, his brother Joshua sold the mill and 4 acres (16,000 m^{2}) of land to Isaac Mather, whose son Joseph built the present mill in 1820.

Farmar Mill is listed on the U.S. National Register of Historic Places.

Today, Farmar Mill is part of a museum and historic site at Hope Lodge operated by the Pennsylvania Historical and Museum Commission. Due to concerns of structural integrity, the building is not open to the public.

== See also ==
- List of the oldest buildings in Pennsylvania
