= Samuel Harding (cabinetmaker) =

18th-century American cabinetmaker

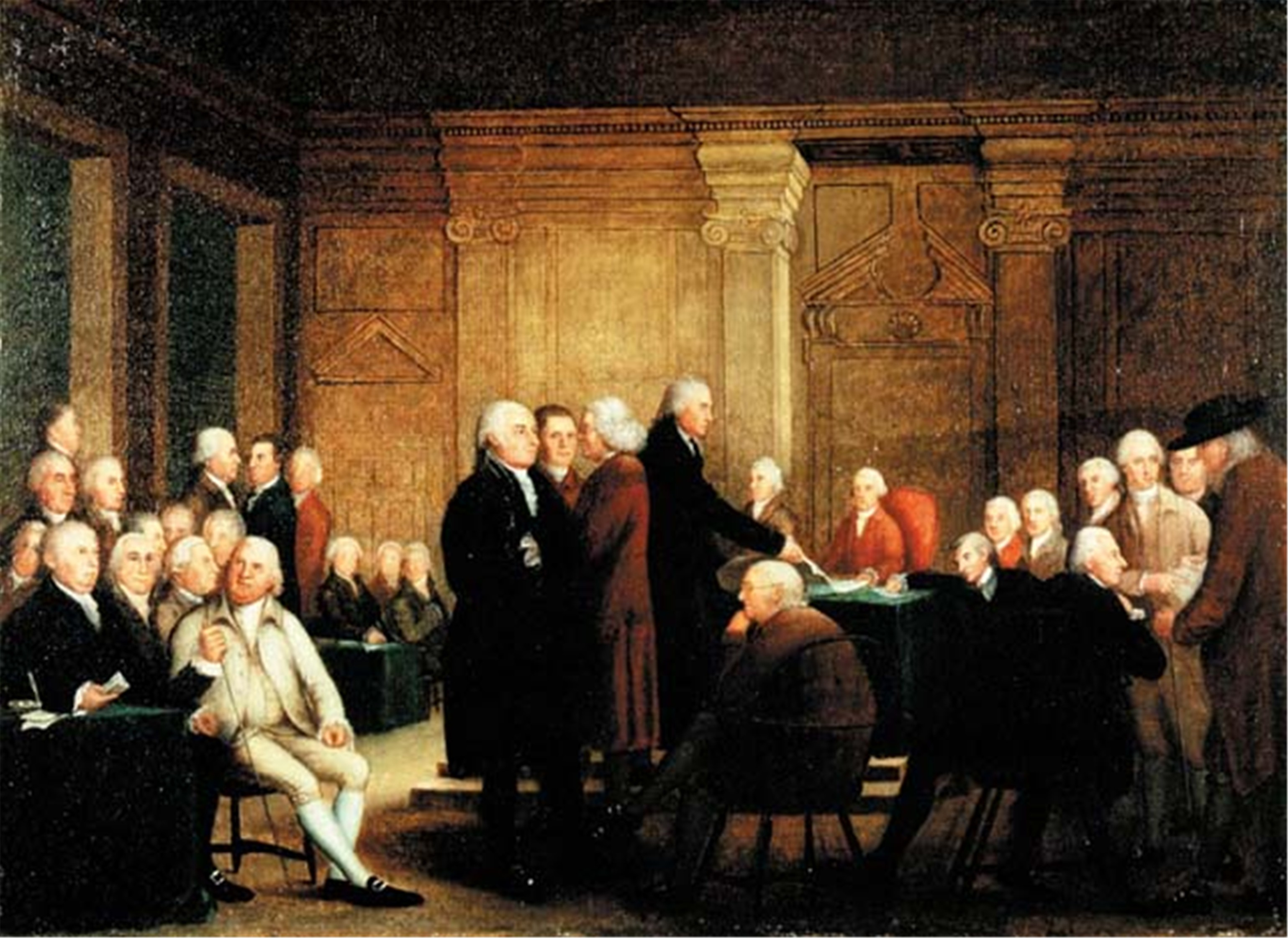
Congress Voting Independence (c. 1784-1788) by Robert Edge Pine. Harding carved the ionic capitals atop the pilasters in the Assembly Room of Independence Hall, and may have carved the shell frieze.

Samuel Harding (died 1758) was an American cabinetmaker, remembered for his Queen Anne style furniture and for the interior architectural ornament of Independence Hall, in Philadelphia, Pennsylvania, United States.

== Independence Hall ==
Builder-architect Edmund Woolley (c. 1695–1771) began construction of the Pennsylvania State House (now Independence Hall) in 1732, and completed the building by 1748. The project's carvers were listed as Harding and Bryan Wilkinson.

The original staircase in the vestibule proved inadequate for so large a building, and a tower addition with a new staircase was proposed. The tower's foundations were laid in 1750, and its exterior construction was completed by 1753. Between 1753 and 1756, Harding executed (and probably designed) the interior architectural ornament for the tower stair hall and a remodeled vestibule. His bill listed all of the fixtures for the mahogany staircase, along with moldings, pediments, column capitals, tabernacle frames, and two keystones with carved "faces" – for which he charged £195.13.11. The bill was paid in part in 1757, and in full in 1758 (possibly, not until after his death).

He carved ionic capitals for what he called the "green room" (thought to be the Assembly Room), but it is unclear when the shell frieze within the room's tabernacle frame was carved—by Harding in the 1750s, or by Harding and/or Wilkinson in the 1740s.

A 54-foot giant tall clock by Thomas Stretch stood against Independence Hall's exterior from 1753 to 1828. Harding carved the 14-foot wooden bonnet that surrounded its face.

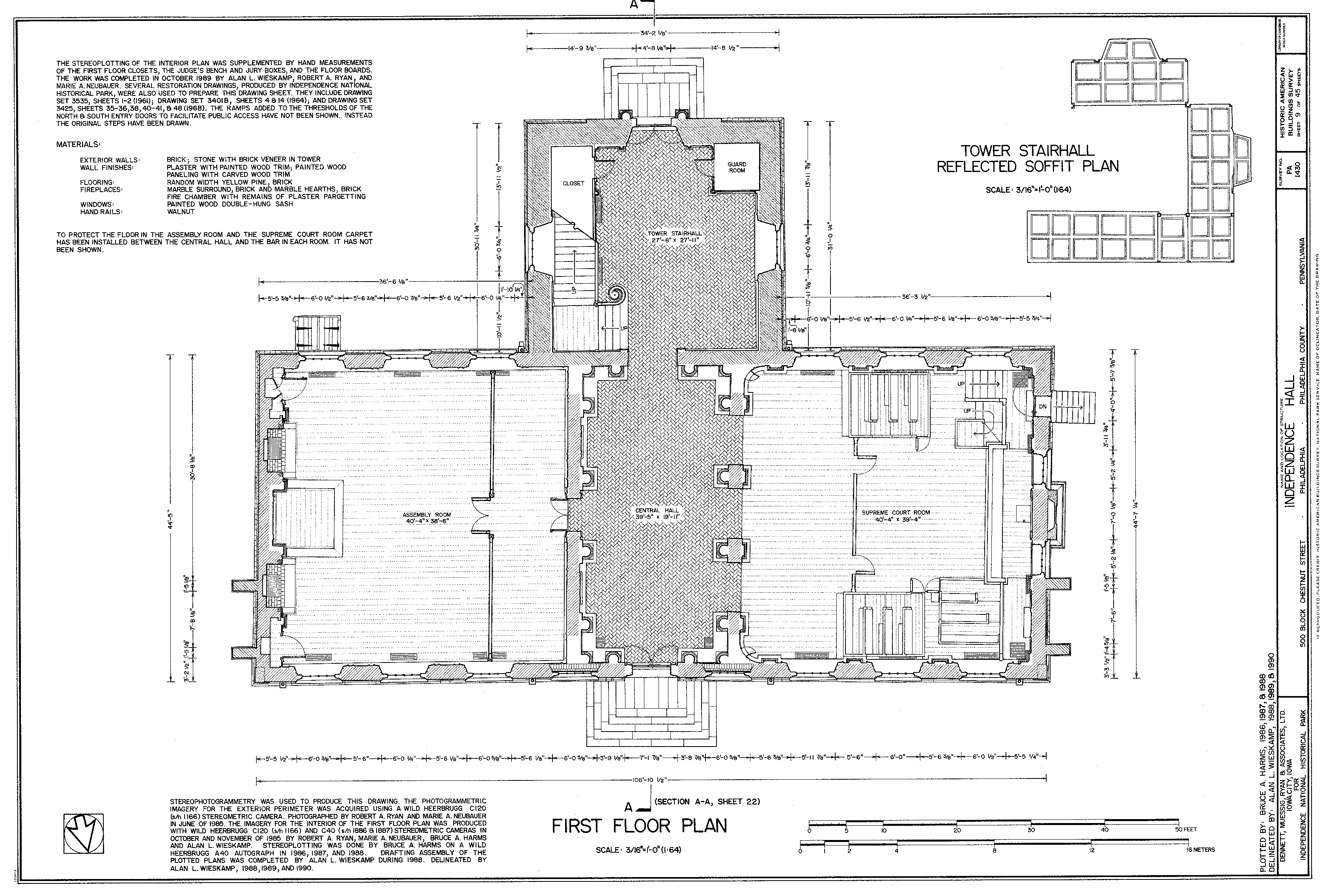
Ground floor of Independence Hall
(right-click links below for room images)

1	Assembly Room
2	Supreme Court Room
3	Vestibule
4	Tower Stair Hall

Harding carved the bonnet of the clock case (1752–53) on Independence Hall's exterior.

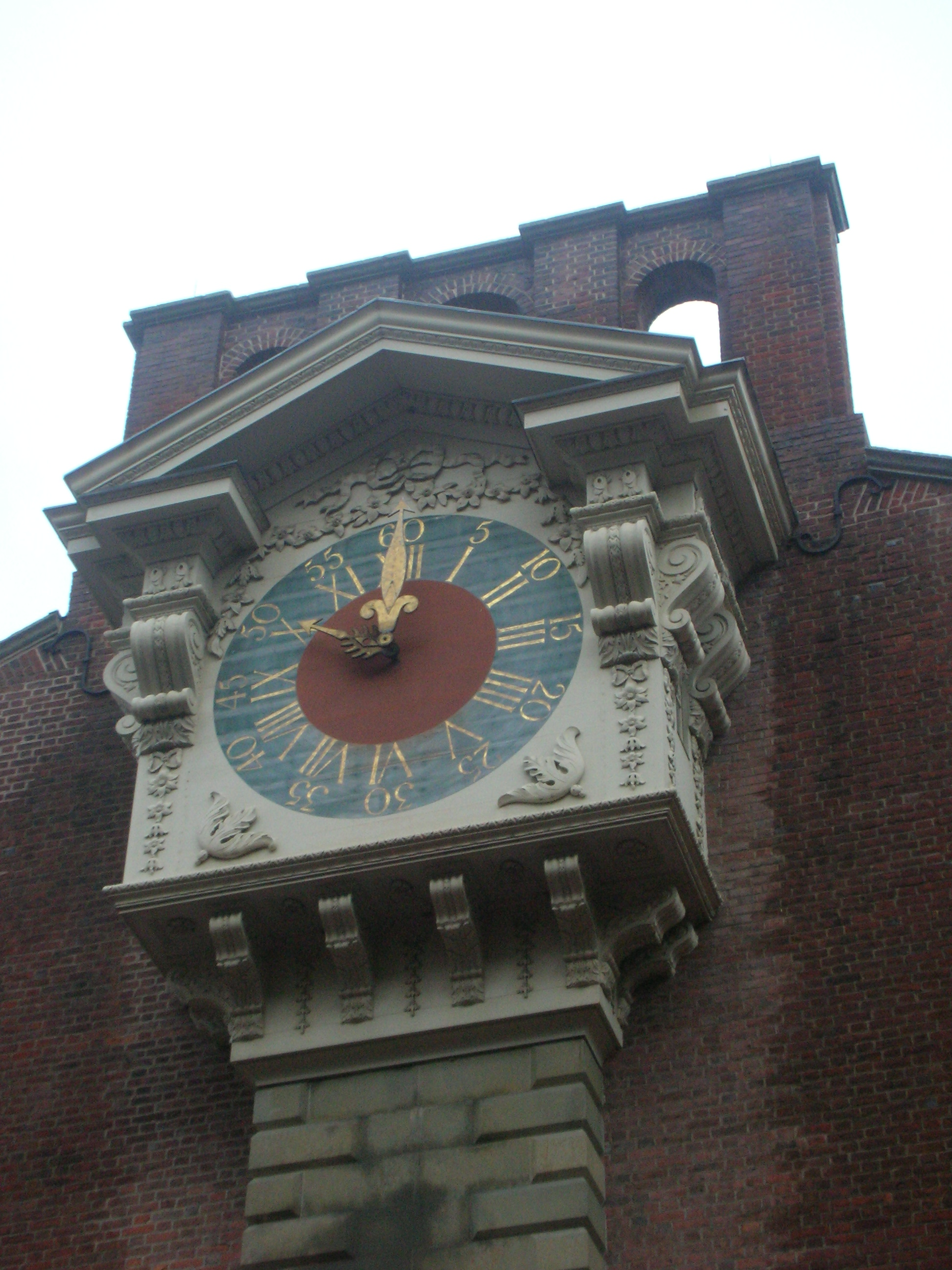
Modern replica of Harding's "bonnet" for the Independence Hall clock.

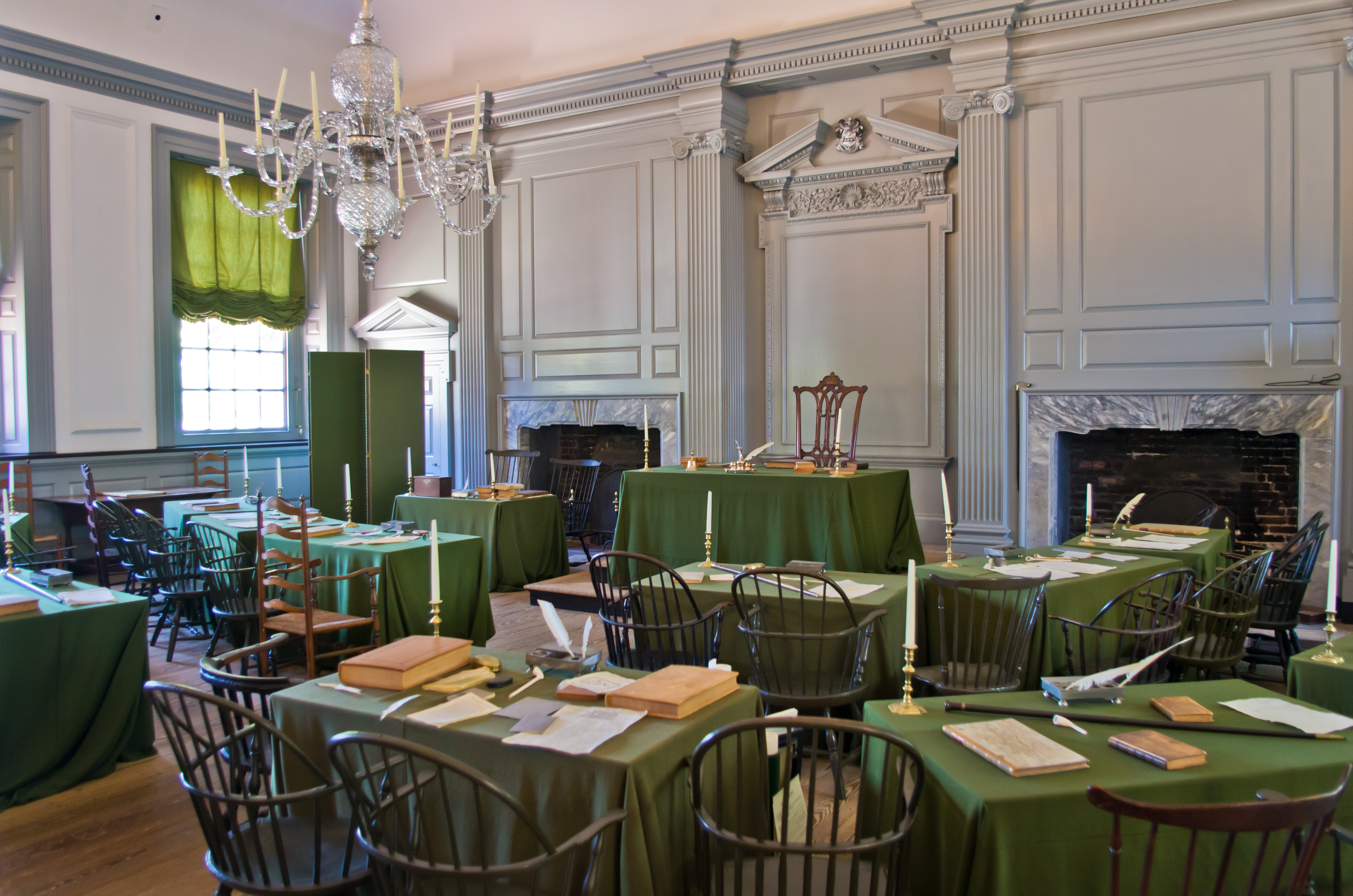
Assembly Room.

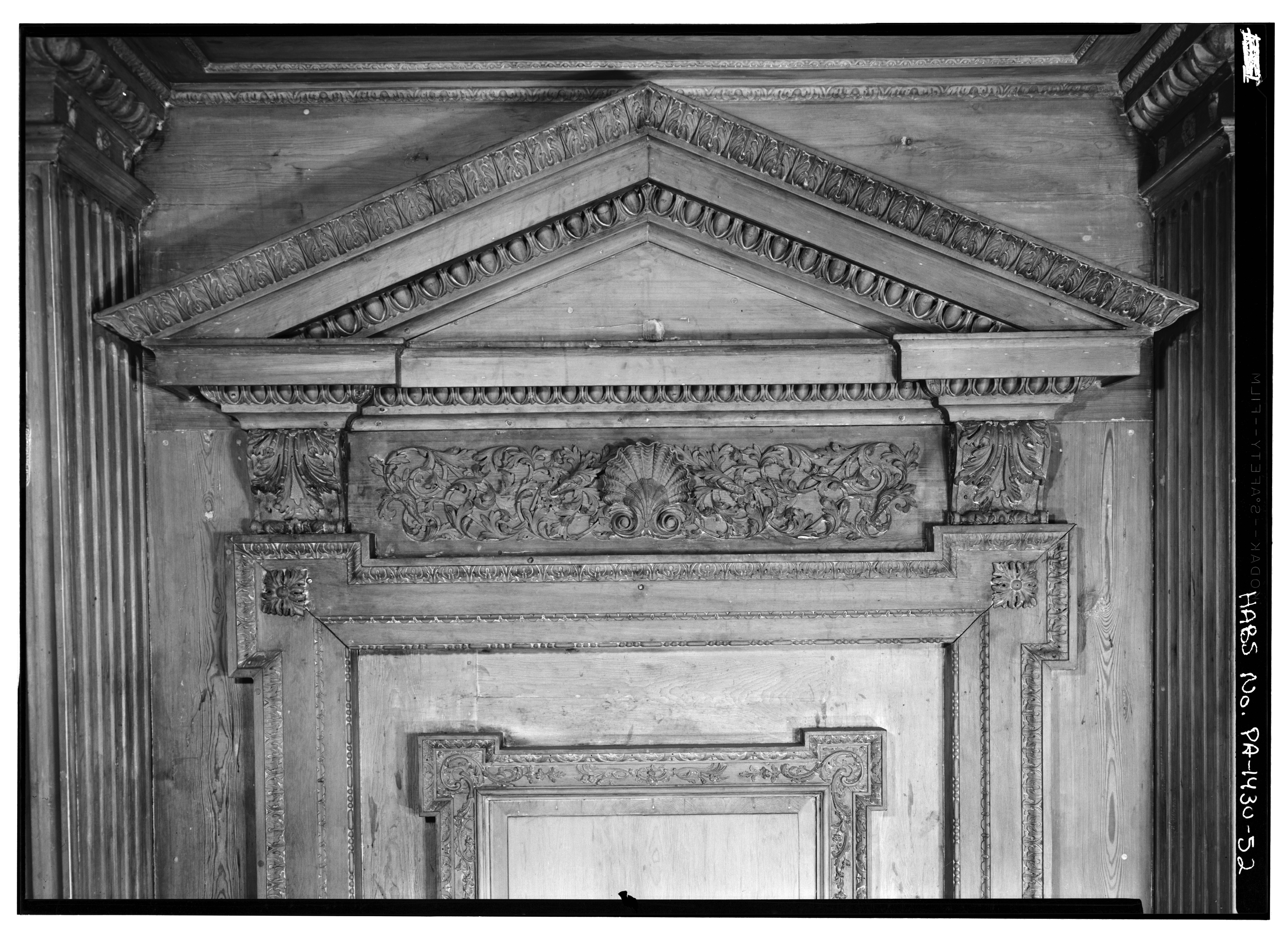
Assembly Room tabernacle frame with shell frieze.

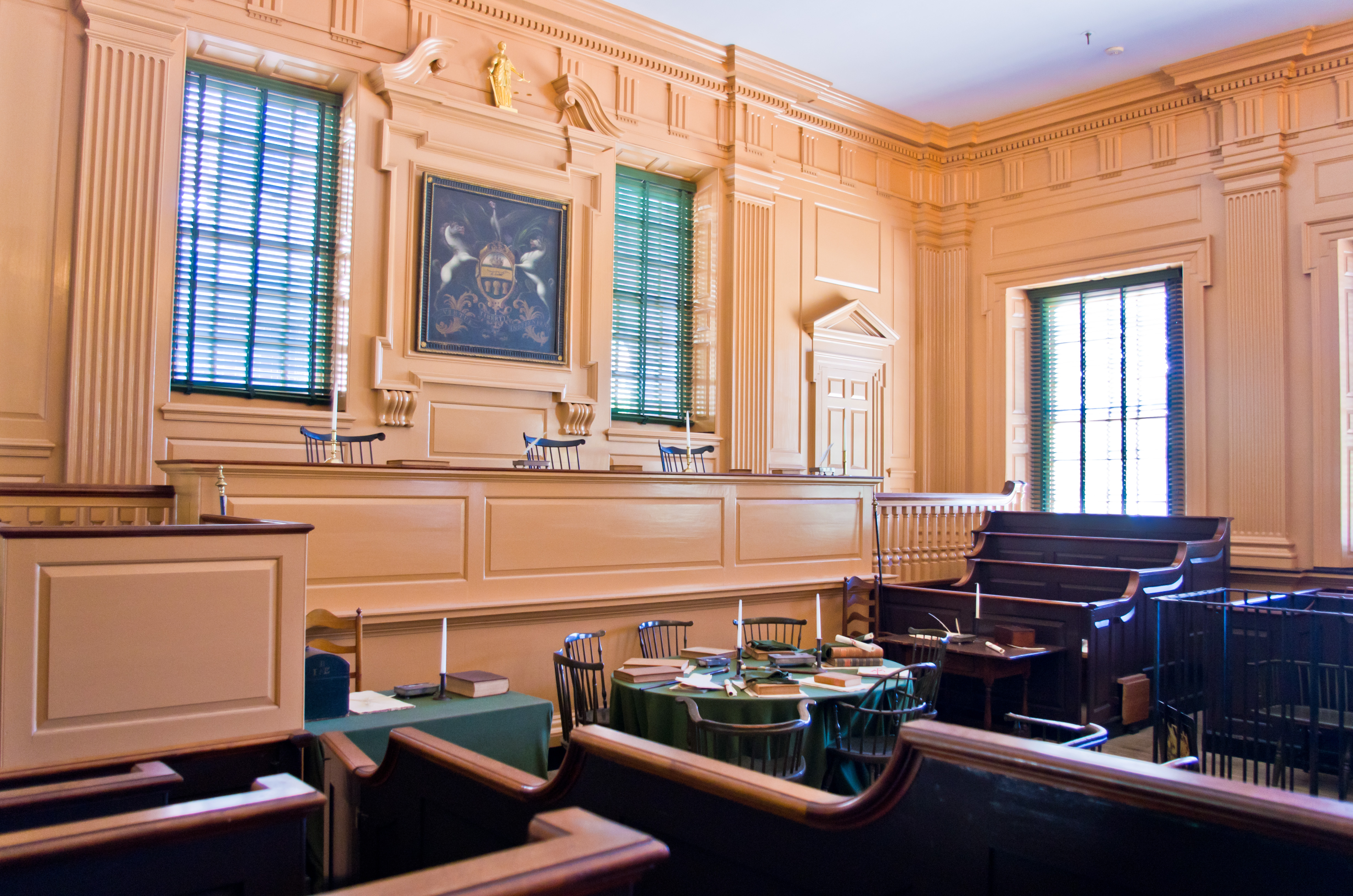
Supreme Court Room.

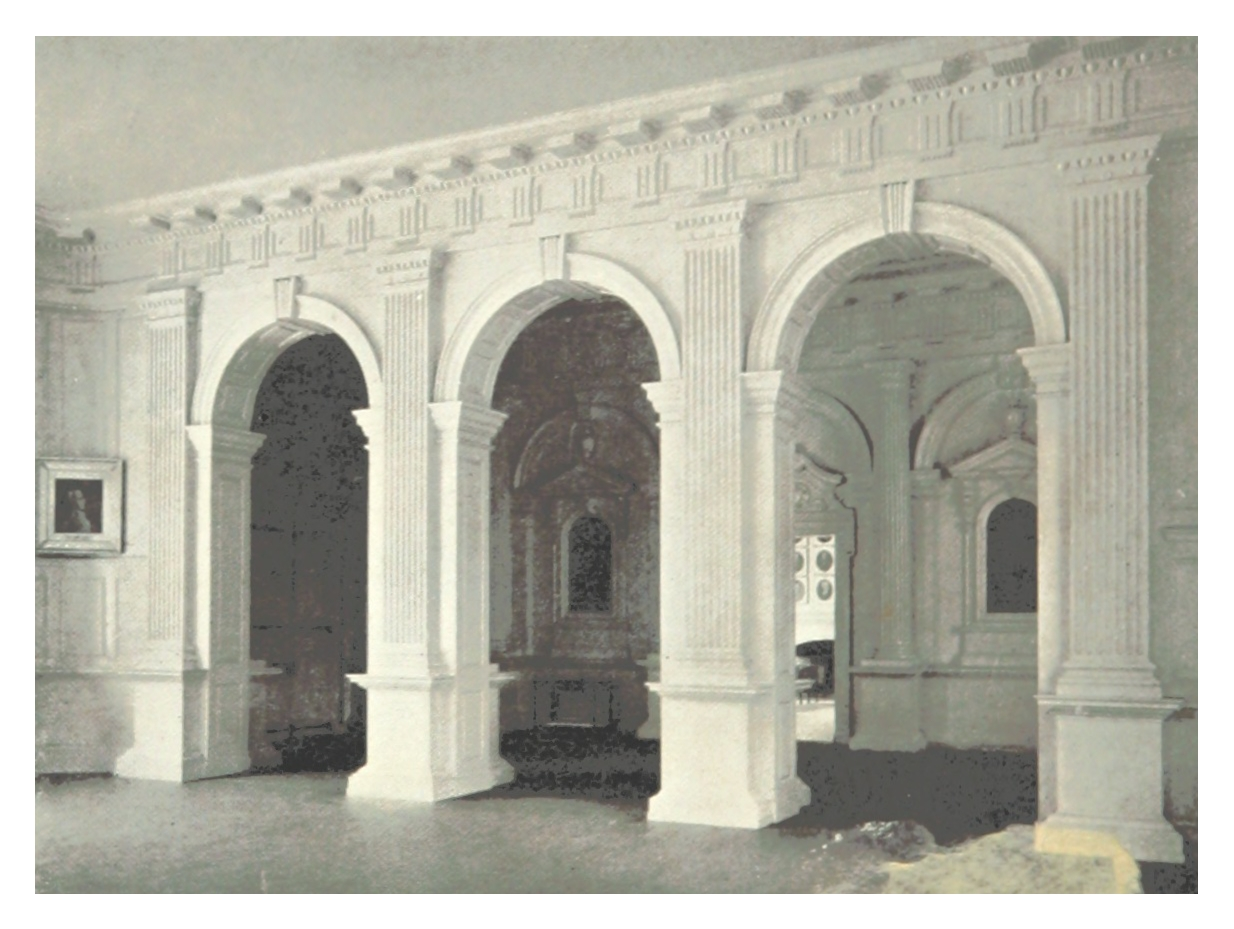
Supreme Court Room looking into Vestibule.

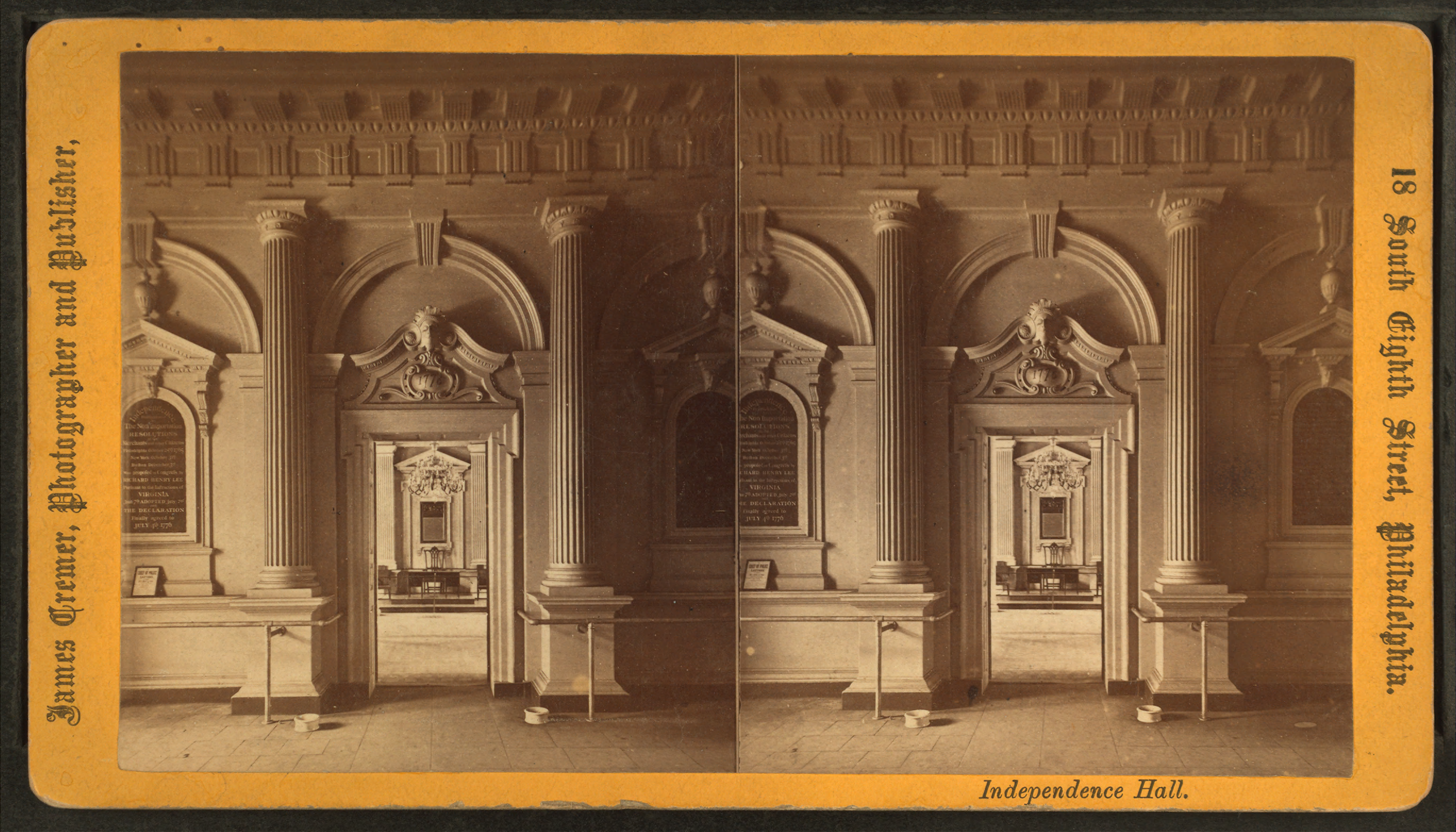
Vestibule.

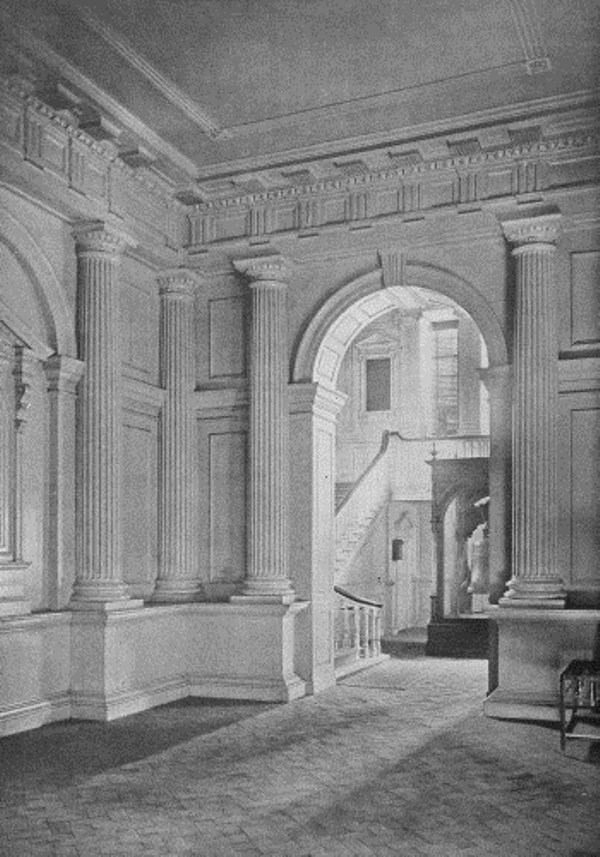
Looking from Vestibule into Tower Stair Hall, 1918.

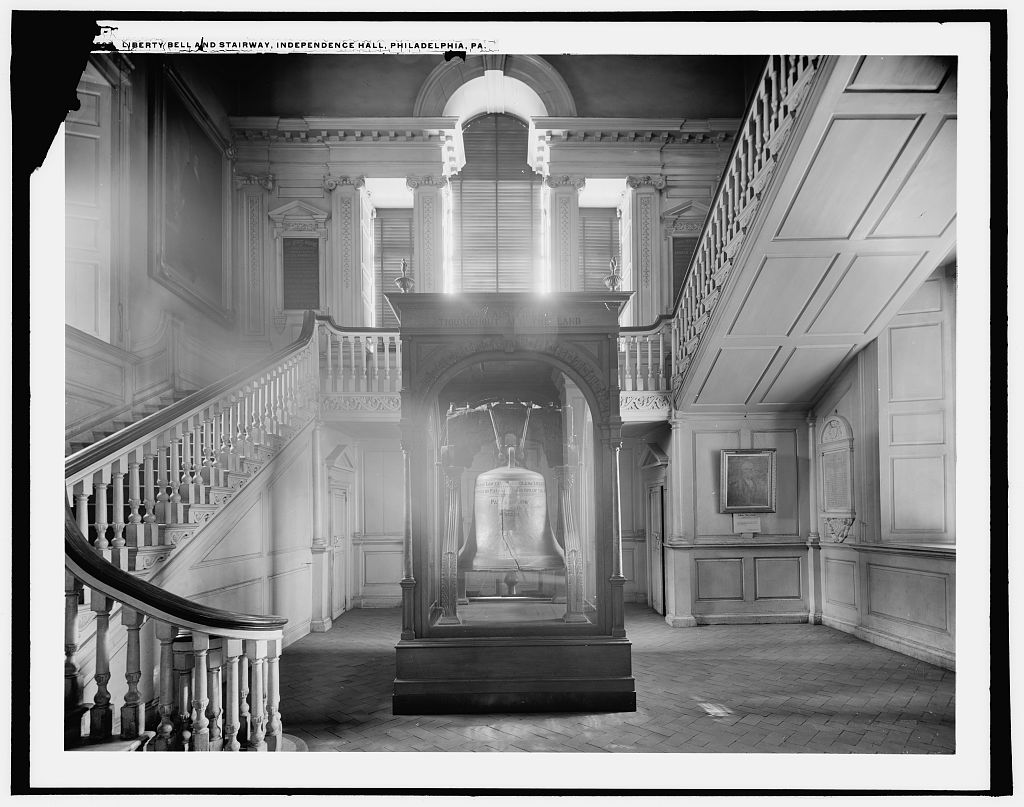
Tower Stair Hall with the Liberty Bell on display, ca. 1905.

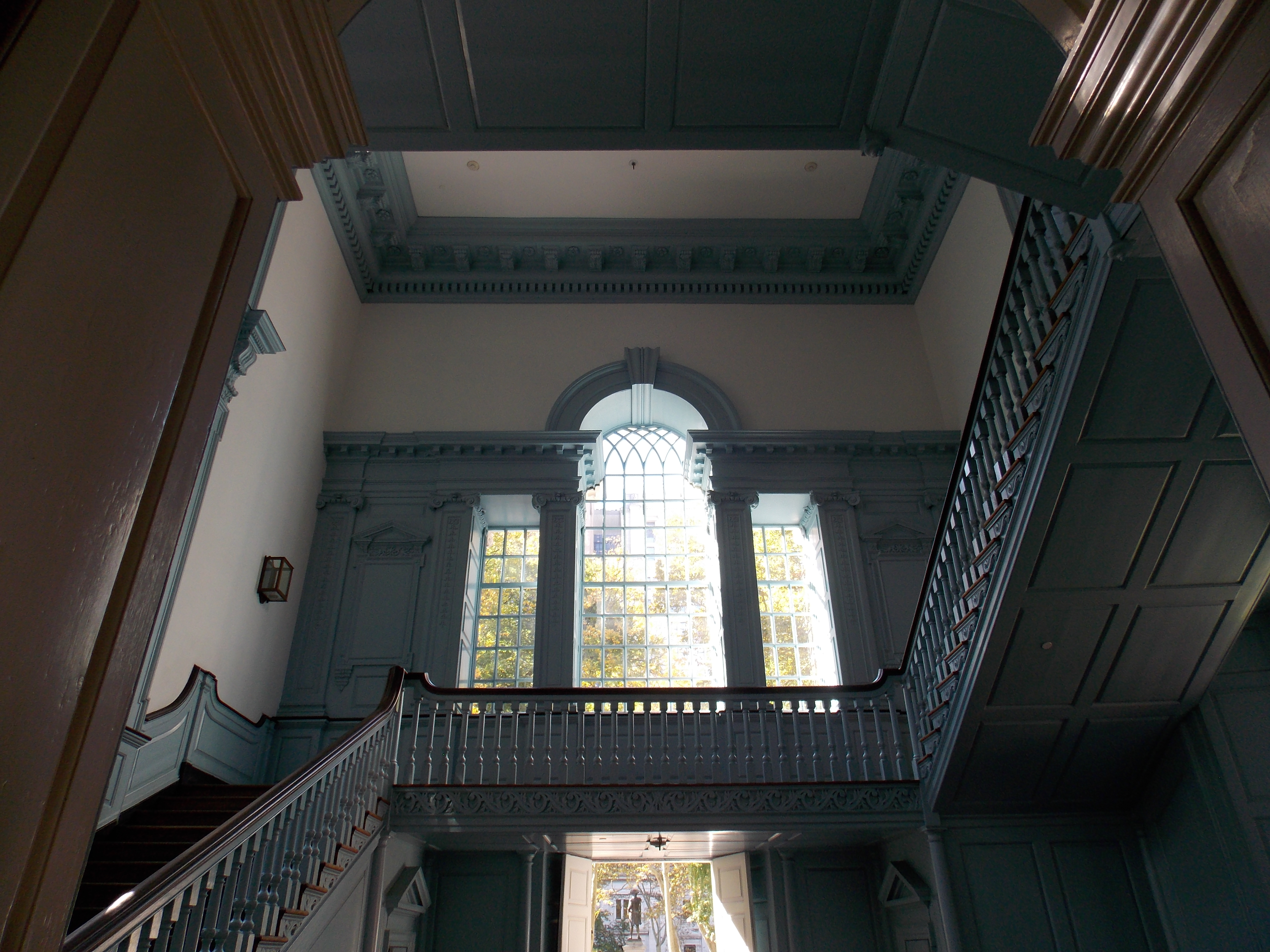
Tower Stair Hall, 2015.

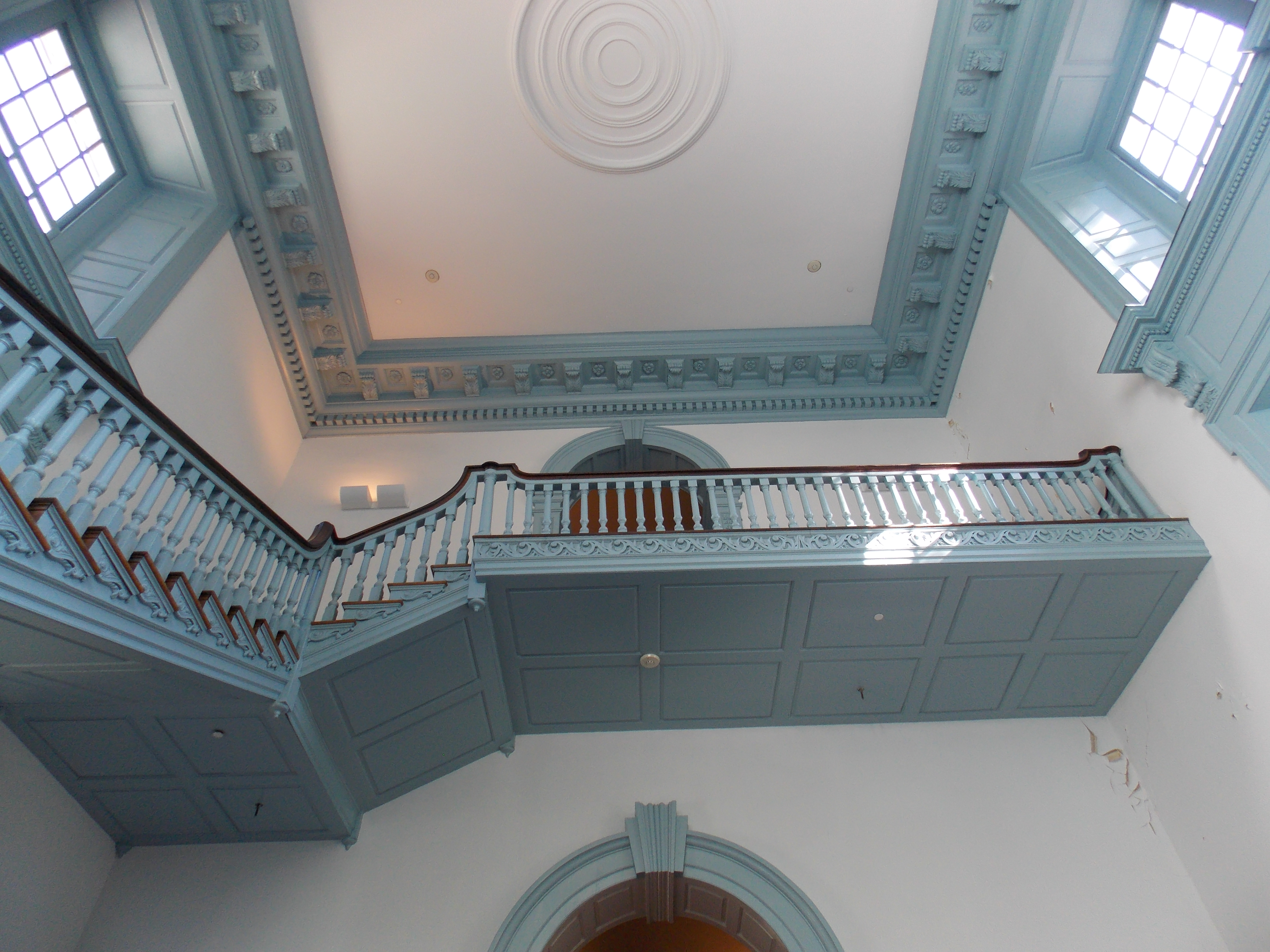
2nd floor landing, 2015.

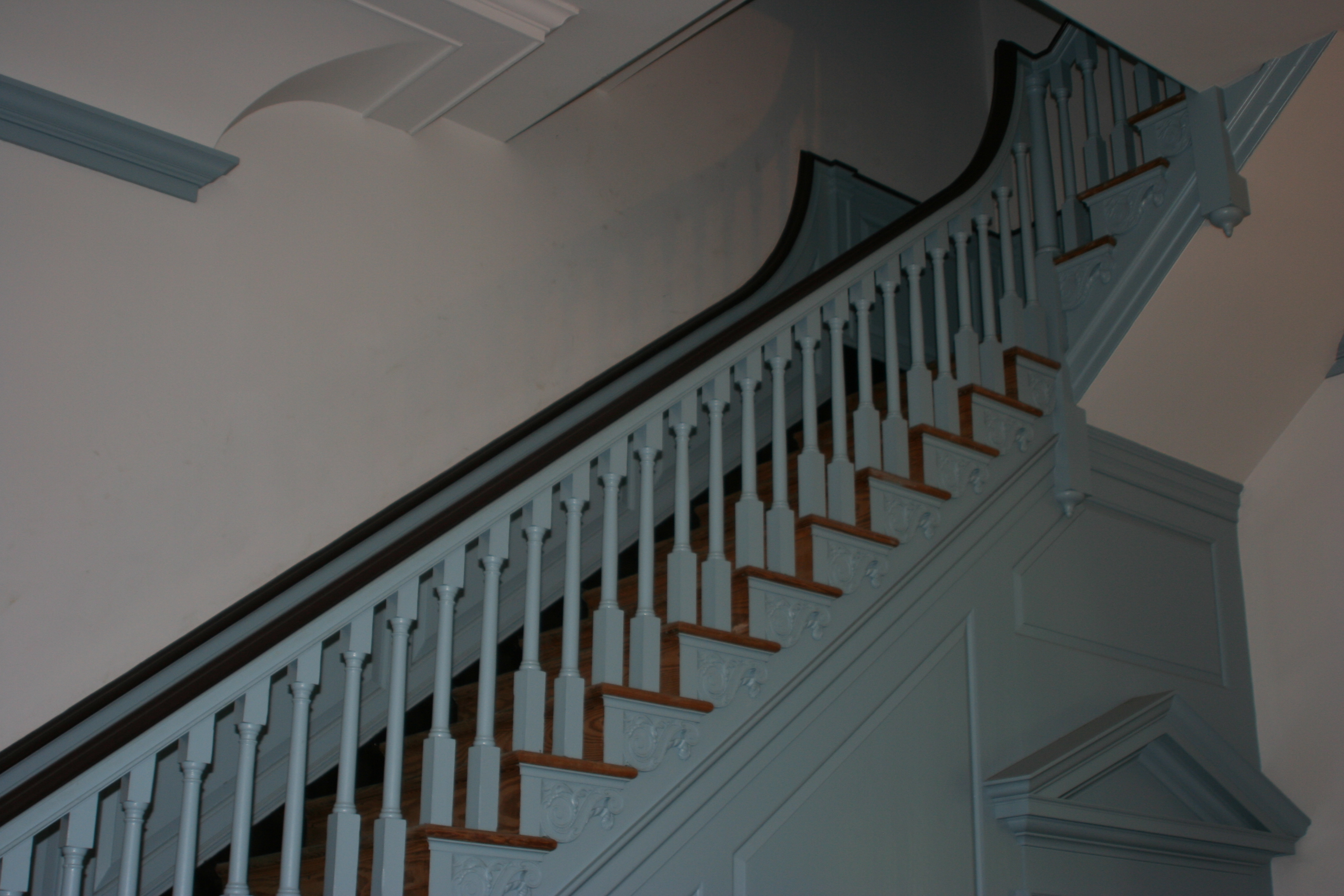
Staircase to the Tower's bell chamber, 2015.

== Other works ==
- Queen Anne side chair (1740–1755, walnut, carving attributed to Harding), sold at Christie's NY, 19 January 2002.
- Desk-and-bookcase (1740–1755, mahogany, attributed to Harding), sold at Christie's NY, 18 January 2008. The frieze across the top of this piece resembles the frieze in the Supreme Court Room of Independence Hall.
- Desk-and-bookcase (1748–1754, mahogany, carving possibly by Harding), Philadelphia Museum of Art.
- Desk-and-bookcase (ca. 1750, walnut, carving attributed to Harding), Chipstone Foundation, Milwaukee, Wisconsin. On loan to Milwaukee Art Museum.
- Dressing table (ca. 1750, mahogany, attributed to the Shop of Harding), sold at Sotheby's NY, 18 January 2008.
- Tea table (ca. 1750, mahogany, carving attributed to Harding), Diplomatic Reception Rooms, U.S. Department of State, Washington, D.C.
- Marble slab table (ca. 1750, mahogany, attributed to Harding), sold at Christie's NY, 20 January 2012.
- Carving work for James Hamilton (1751 and 1753). This may have included a coat-of-arms.
- Eight grotesque faces (1753–54), Steeple of Christ Church, Philadelphia. Harding was paid £12 to carve these.
- Whitby Hall (ca. 1754, attributed to Harding), 1601 South 58th Street, Kingsessing, Philadelphia. The architectural ornament of the Independence Hall-inspired stair tower and the chimneypiece and paneling of the parlor are attributed to Harding. These interiors were removed from Whitby Hall in the 1920s, and installed in the Detroit Institute of Arts.
- Queen Anne transitional highboy (ca. 1755, mahogany, carving attributed to Harding), sold for $128,700 at Pook & Pook Inc., 20 June 2009.
- Overmantel (1756, attributed to Harding), Woodford Mansion, Philadelphia, Pennsylvania.
- Desk-and-bookcase (ca. 1775, mahogany, attributed to Harding), Naomi Wood Collection, Woodford Mansion, Philadelphia, Pennsylvania. The carved shell on this desk-and-bookcase resembles Harding's other work, but the estimated date of the piece is well after his death.
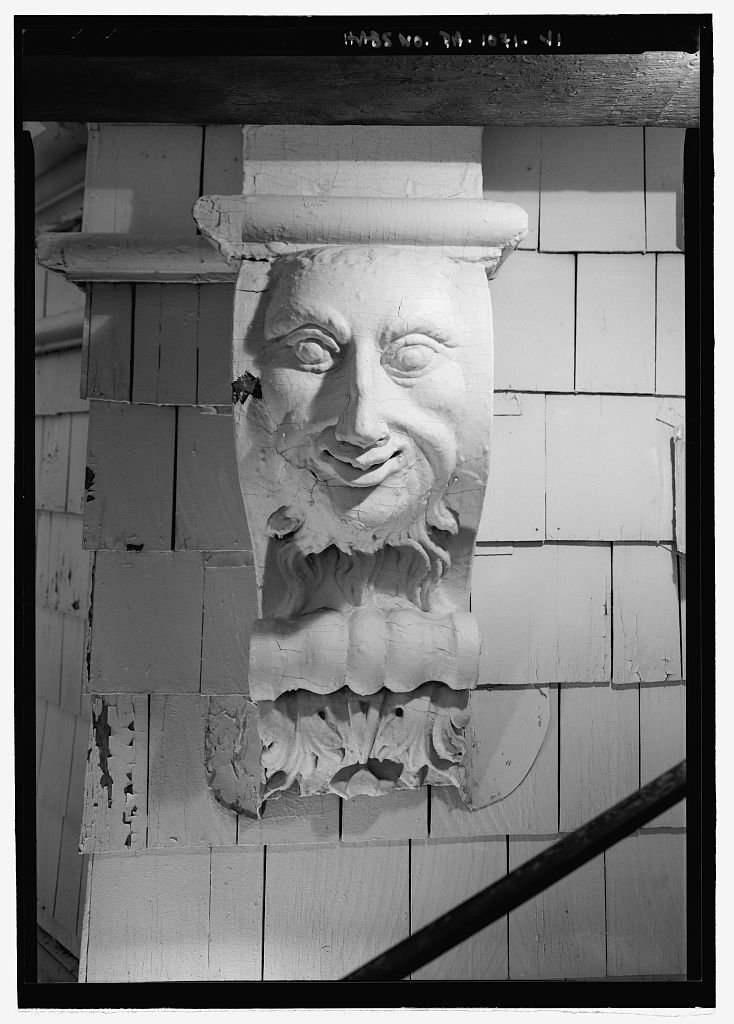
Grotesque face (1753–54), one of eight faces on the steeple of Christ Church, Philadelphia, Pennsylvania.

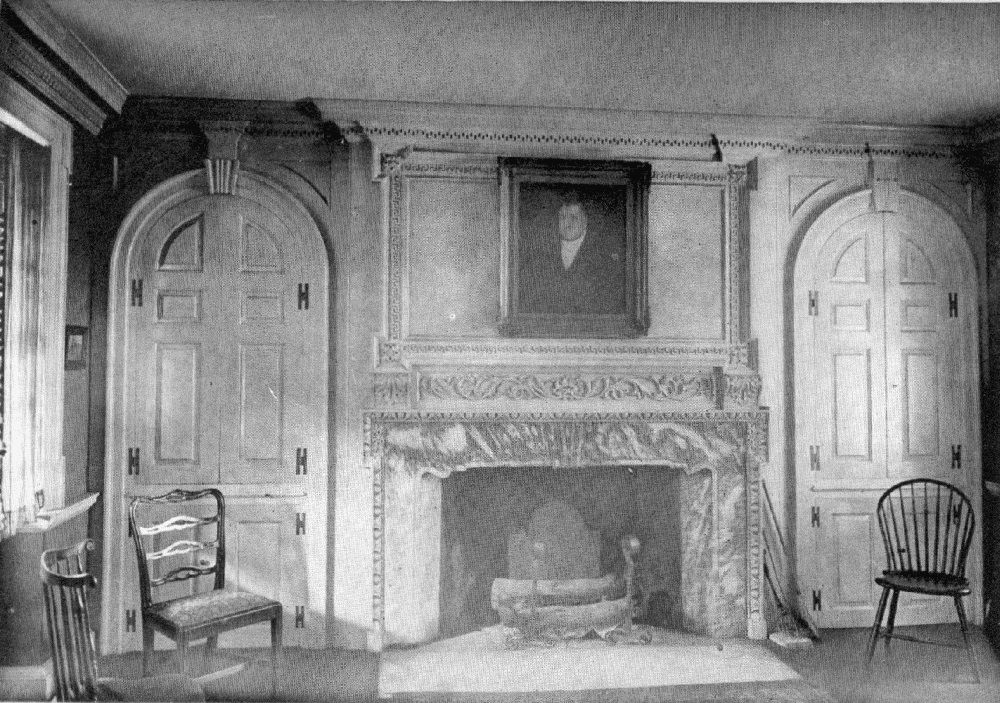
Parlor (ca. 1754), Whitby Hall, Philadelphia, Pennsylvania. The room is now installed in the Detroit Institute of Arts.

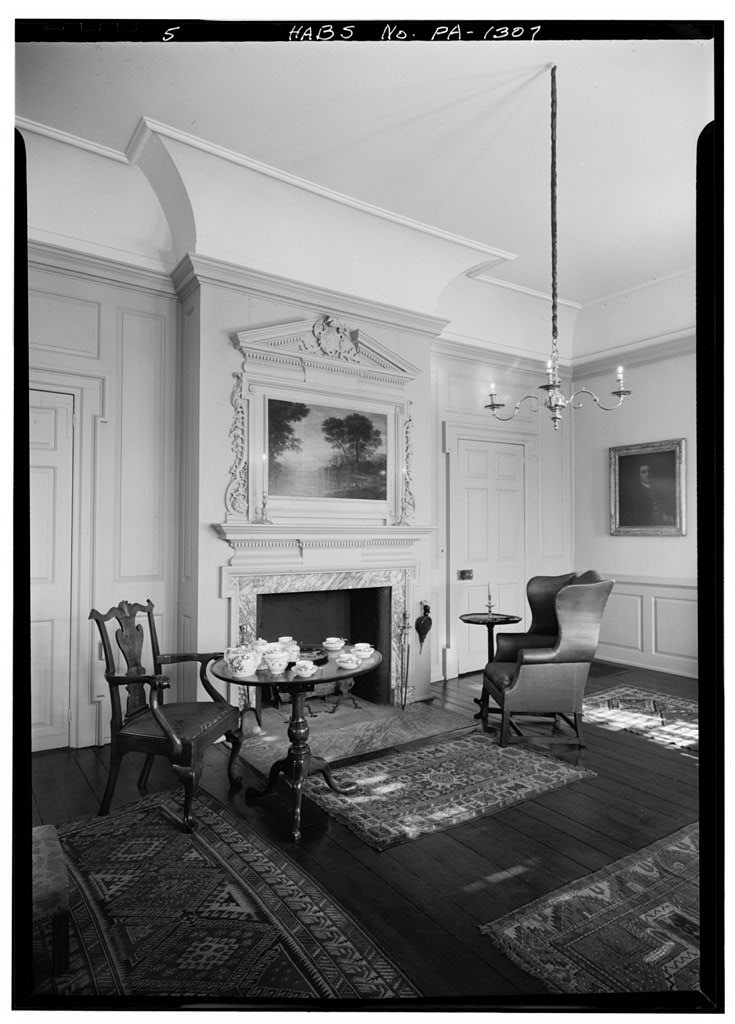
Parlor, Woodford Mansion, Philadelphia, Pennsylvania. The carved overmantel (1756) is attributed to Harding.

== Assessment ==
Furniture expert Luke Beckerdite calls Harding "one of the most important carvers active in Philadelphia during the first half of the eighteenth century." He conjectures that the carver Nicholas Bernard either was trained or influenced by him.
