= James Peller Malcolm =

James Peller Malcolm (1767–1815) was an American-English topographer and engraver.

== Life ==
Son of a merchant in Philadelphia, he was born there in August 1767. He was admitted to the Quaker school; but his family left to avoid the fighting in American Revolutionary War, and his education was mostly at Pottstown, Pennsylvania. He returned with his family to Philadelphia in 1784, after the conclusion of peace. Acting on the advice of Mr. Bembridge, a relative and fellow-student of Benjamin West, he went to London, and pursued artistic studies for two years in the Royal Academy. Finding that history painting and landscape painting were not much in demand, he took to engraving and the compilation of books on topographical and historical subjects. He was elected a Fellow of the Society of Antiquaries.

He died in Gee Street, Clarendon Square, London, on 5 April 1815, leaving his mother and wife unprovided for.

== Works ==
Many of his engravings are in the Gentleman's Magazine, from 1792 to 1814. His Excursions through Kent and works in John Nichols's History of Leicestershire, were long-term projects. He engraved and published three views of Leathersellers' Hall, on the site of St Helen's Church, Bishopsgate, London, and two large plates of the inside of the Middle Temple Hall, and one external view, under the auspices of the society.

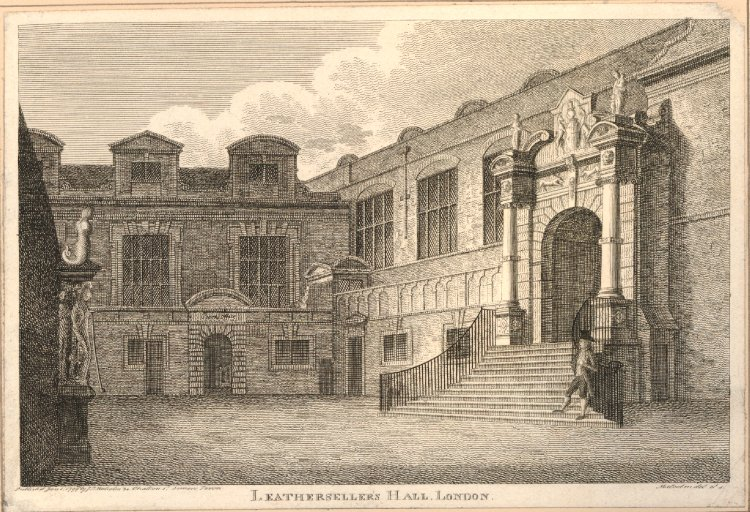
Leathersellers' Hall, Bishopsgate, London, 1799 print.

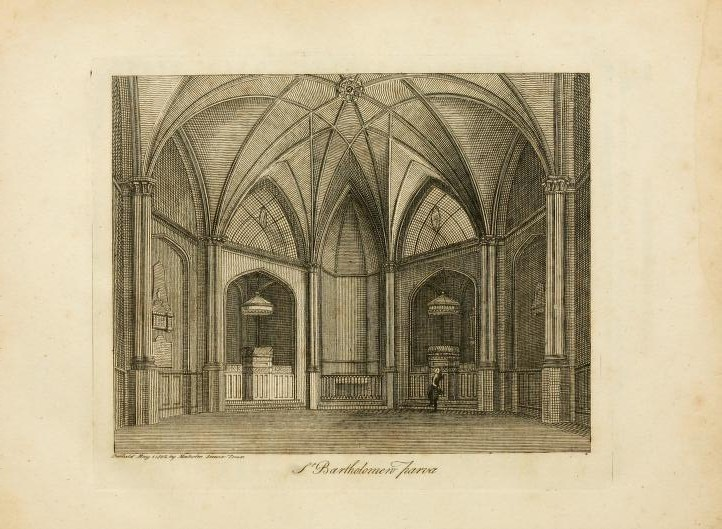
Interior of St Bartholomew-the-Less, from Londinium Redivivum vol. 1, 1802.

Malcolm's major work was Londinium Redivivum, or an Antient History and Modern Description of London, compiled from Parochial Records, Archives of various Foundations, the Harleian MSS. and other authentic Sources (4 vols. London 1802–7). It was a parochial history compiled from original records, such as vestry-books, churchwardens' accounts, and parish registers. The dean and chapter of St Paul's Cathedral gave him free access to their archives. The work is accompanied by forty-seven plates.

Malcolm's other publications were:

- Seventy-nine plates to illustrate Daniel Lysons's Environs of London (1797–1800).
- Twenty Views within Twelve Miles of London (1800)'
- Letters between the Rev. James Granger, M.A., and many of the most eminent Literary Men of his Time(1805).
- First Impressions, or Sketches from Art and Nature, Animate and Inanimate (1807).
- Excursions in the Counties of Kent, Gloucester, Hereford, Monmouth, and Somersetshire in 1802, 1803, and 1805; illustrated by Descriptive Sketches (1807; second edition 1814, with twenty-four plates).
- Anecdotes of the Manners and Customs of London during the Eighteenth Century; including the Charities, Depravities, Dresses, and Amusements of the City of London during that Period; with a Review of the State of Society in 1807. To which is added a Sketch of the Domestic and Ecclesiastical Architecture, and of the various Improvements in the Metropolis, illustrated by fifty Engravings, (1808; another edition 1810).
- Anecdotes of the Manners and Customs of London, from the Roman Invasion to the Year 1700, illustrated by eighteen Engravings (1811).
- Miscellaneous Anecdotes, illustrative of the Manners and History of Europe during the Reigns of Charles II, James II, William III, and Queen Anne (1811).
- An Historical Sketch of the Art of Caricaturing, with graphic Illustrations (1813).

== Gallery ==
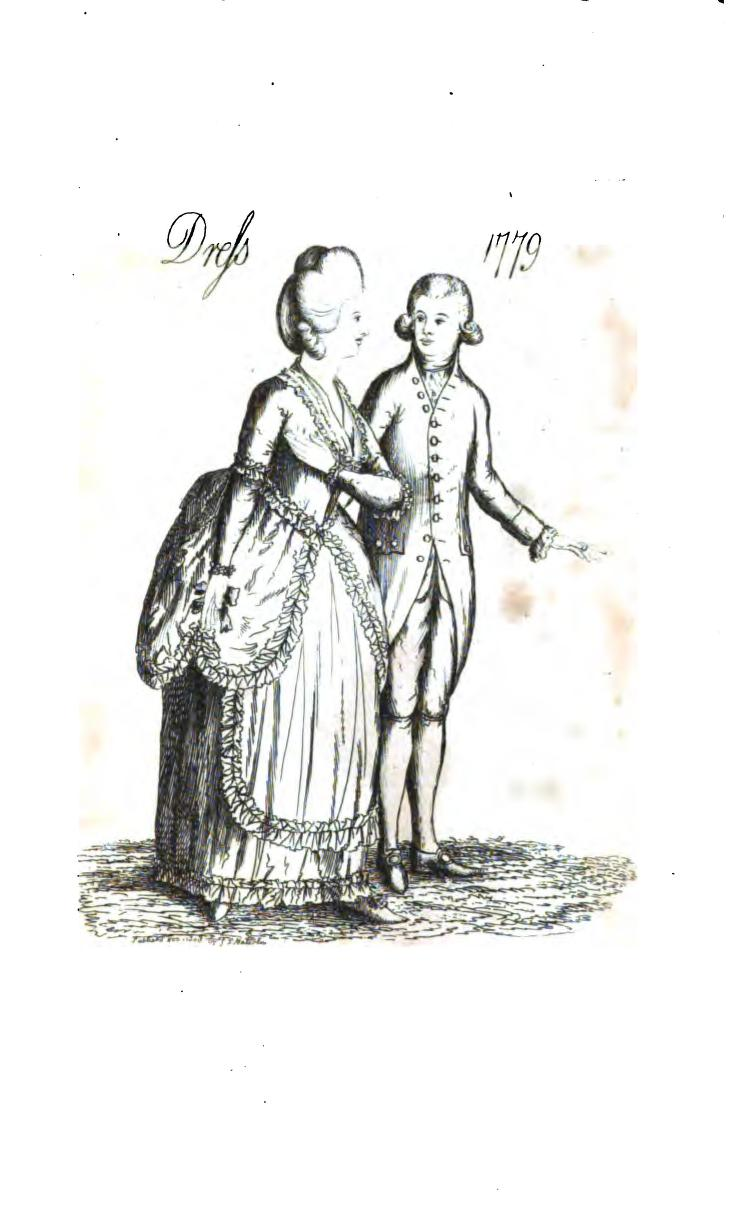
Dress in 1779, from Anecdotes of the Manners and Customs of London vol. 2, 1810
