= Annis Boudinot Stockton =

American writer

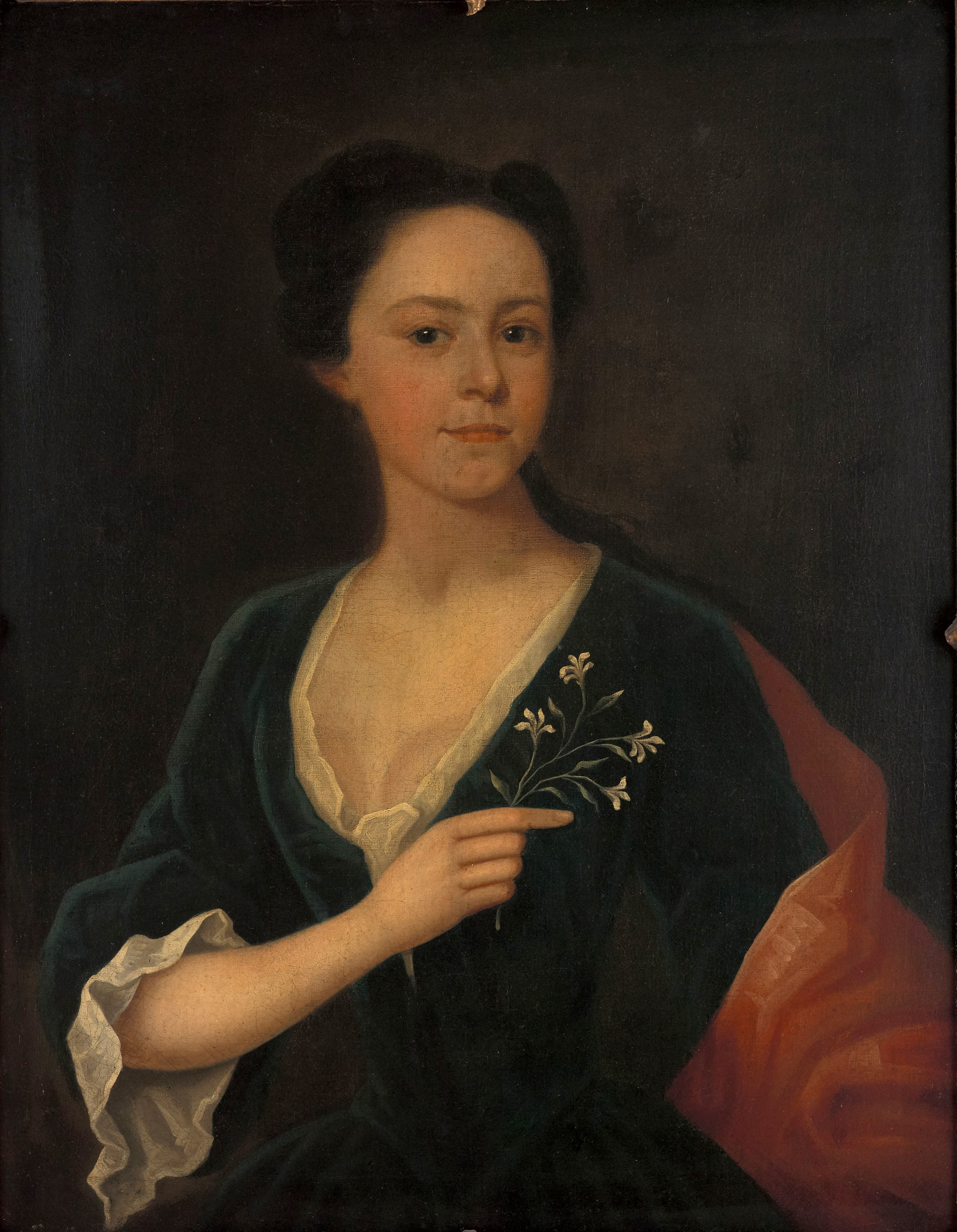
- Annis Boudinot Stockton
- Born: July 1, 1736; Darby, Pennsylvania
- Died: February 6, 1801 (aged 64); White Hill, New Jersey (now Fieldsboro, New Jersey)
- Spouse: Richard Stockton (m. 1757; death 1781)
- Relatives: Elias Boudinot (brother); David Hunter
- Writing career
- Notable work: "An invitation ode to a young Lady in New York from her friend in the Country"

Annis Boudinot Stockton (July 1, 1736 – February 6, 1801) was an American poet, one of the first women to be published in the Thirteen Colonies. Living in Princeton, New Jersey, Stockton wrote and published her poems in leading newspapers and magazines of the day and was part of a Mid-Atlantic writing circle. She was the author of more than 120 works, but it was not until 1985, when a manuscript copybook long held privately was given to the New Jersey Historical Society, that most of them became known. Before that, she was known to have written 40 poems. The copybook contained poems that tripled the amount of her known work. A complete collection of her works was published in 1995. She is featured in the permanent exhibit at Morven Museum & Garden in Princeton, NJ.

A member of the New Jersey elite, Stockton was the only woman to be elected as an honorary member of the American Whig Society, a secret revolutionary group. After the American Revolutionary War, they recognized Stockton's service in protecting their papers during the British attack on Princeton.

== Early life and education ==
Annis Boudinot was born in 1736 in Darby, Pennsylvania, to Elias Boudinot, a merchant and silversmith, and Catherine Williams. The Boudinot ancestors were French Huguenot refugees who came to the North American colonies in the late 17th century. She was the second of ten children, of whom about half survived to adulthood.

== Marriage and family ==
Around 1757, Boudinot married Richard Stockton, an attorney from a prominent family. Part of the New Jersey elite class, they had several children.

During the American Revolution, her husband was one of the signatories of the Declaration of Independence. Annis Stockton became known as the "Duchess of Morven," their mansion and estate in Princeton, New Jersey, where they entertained many prominent guests. These included George Washington, with whom Annis Stockton had a correspondence, sending him numerous poems as part of it. Morven was named after a mythical Gaelic kingdom in a poem by Ossian. Morven would serve as the New Jersey Governor's Mansion between 1944 and 1981.

During the war, British general General Cornwallis plundered Morven, burned Stockton's "splendid library and papers, and drove off his stock, much of which was blooded and highly valuable." ("Blooded" means purebred and thus valuable.) Richard Stockton had escaped but was later captured and imprisoned by the British. He suffered lasting ill effects to his health and died in 1781 at the age of 51, before the official end of the war.

The Boudinot-Stockton families were also connected through Annis's younger brother Elias Boudinot. He had studied law with her husband to prepare for the bar. After establishing himself as an attorney, Elias married Hannah Stockton, Richard's younger sister. Boudinot became a statesman from New Jersey and was elected as President of the Continental Congress in 1782–1783. He signed the Treaty of Paris.

== Literary career ==
Annis Boudinot Stockton was one of the first female published poets in the Thirteen Colonies. She published 21 poems in the "most prestigious newspapers and magazines of her day." They addressed political and social issues, and she used the wide variety of genres considered integral to neoclassical writing: odes, pastorals, elegies, sonnets, epitaphs, hymns, and epithalamia. Her works were read both in the colonies and internationally, in England and in France.

She was well known as a prolific writer among her Middle Atlantic writing circle, which included Elizabeth Graeme Fergusson, Benjamin Young Prime, Samuel Stanhope Smith, Philip Freneau, and Hugh Henry Brackenridge. Stockton's connection to Fergusson also linked her to such women writers as Anna Young Smith, Susanna Wright, Milcah Martha Moore and Hannah Griffitts. At the time, many of these writers passed most of their works to each other in manuscript. This was particularly true of women. Because of that, they were not as well known to later scholars as writers whose works were published, but they represented an active and influential part of the literary culture. In the late twentieth century, more manuscripts of their works have been made available to the public and some have been published.

In 1984 Christine Carolyn McMillan Cairnes and her husband George H. Cairnes donated a large manuscript copybook containing numerous poems and other pieces by Stockton to the New Jersey Historical Society. The following year, this copybook was made available to researchers for the first time. Before then, Stockton was known to have written 40 poems, but the pieces in the copybook expanded the total of her works threefold. In 1995 the scholar Carla Mulford published a collection of 125 poems, all of Stockton's known pieces; she also provided a lengthy introduction that provided insights into the poet's time and late eighteenth-century society.

A patriot in her own right, Stockton rescued and hid important papers of the American Whig Society prior to the British invasion of Princeton, as it was a secret society committed to the revolution. After the war, the Society honored her as an honorary member for her services, the only woman to be so recognized.

In correspondence with George Washington, whom she had hosted at Morven, Stockton sent him both poems and letters. His reply to one, giving an idea of their shared topics, may be seen at The Papers of George Washington, University of Virginia.
