= Joseph Fox (Pennsylvania politician) =

Colonial patriot (1709–1779)

Joseph Justinian Fox

26th Speaker of the Pennsylvania Provincial Assembly
- In office 1764, 1769 – 1766, 1769
- Preceded by: Isaac Norris II
- Succeeded by: Joseph Galloway

Member of the Pennsylvania Colonial Assembly
- In office 1750–1751

Pennsylvania Colonial Assembly for Philadelphia County
- In office 1753–1771

Personal details
- Born: January 12, 1709 Philadelphia, Pennsylvania, British America
- Died: October 12, 1779 (aged 70) North Third Street, Philadelphia, Pennsylvania
- Party: Anti-Proprietary
- Spouses: Elizabeth Mickle (m. 1746); January 1, 1805 (aged 76)
- Children: Thomasine Mickle; Hannah; Joseph Mickle; George; Samuel Mickle; Elizabeth Hill; Seven infant deaths
- Parents: Justinian Fox; (Plymouth, Devon, England); Elizabeth Yard; (Exeter, Devon, England)
- Profession: Colonial Politician; Land surveyor; Master builder (Carpenters' Company); Municipal affairs

Joseph Fox (January 12, 1709 – December 10, 1779) served as a Pennsylvania councilor during the colonial governship of Pennsylvania being a proprietary colony subjugated by The Crown. Fox's civic tenure spanned from 1750 to 1771 serving the Pennsylvania Colonial Assembly suitably elected by the council as Speaker of the Pennsylvania Provincial Assembly from 1764 to 1766. During 1769, Joseph served as a provisional speaker for the Pennsylvania Provincial Assembly upon the unforeseen ailment of Joseph Galloway.

Joseph Fox was a craft guild member of the Carpenters' Company of Philadelphia. Fox was apprenticed to James Portues serving Philadelphia as an architect and master builder. Portues died in 1737 leaving Fox a substantial financial fund allowing credit loans for municipal developments and guild craftsmen relations in Philadelphia.

Fox being a company master by 1763 and possessing the financial resources fostered a harmonious rapport with the Carpenters' Company tradesmen. The craftsmen guild illustrated their talents by the construction and development of the Philadelphia Commons known as Carpenters' Hall located in close proximity to Independence Hall and Society Hill. Fox was unwaveringly recognized as kindling the essence of the prelude to the American Revolutionary War with the craftsmen guild of Philadelphia.

== Family ==
Justinian Fox, father of Joseph Fox, was born December 19, 1673, in Plymouth, Devon, England. Justinian arrived in British Colonial America with the Plymouth Friends in 1686 establishing the Plymouth Meeting, Pennsylvania settlement. Elizabeth Yard, mother of Joseph Fox, was born 1678 in Philadelphia, Pennsylvania. Elizabeth has ancestry origins in the United Kingdom geographically in the civil parish of Exeter, Devon, England. Justinian Fox and Elizabeth Yard corroborated their matrimonial union after Plymouth Friends maritime landing and arrival in Plymouth Meeting, Pennsylvania.

Joseph Fox was born to Justinian Fox and Elizabeth Yard in Philadelphia, Pennsylvania on January 12, 1709. Joseph was christened on March 12, 1709, at First Church, Philadelphia known as Christ Church located in Old City, Philadelphia. Joseph Fox and Elizabeth Mickle shared matrimonial vows on September 25, 1746, at Plymouth Meeting, Pennsylvania. Fox and Mickle had thirteen children with subsequently six children thriving to adulthood.

== Philadelphia Country Estate ==
In 1770, Joseph Fox established a two hundred acre estate ten miles north of Old City, Philadelphia known in present time as Olney, Philadelphia. The first architecture built on the property was a stone structure and by generational descent would become known as Champlost.

In November 1777, the stone dwelling was ravaged by an act of arson due to a potential royalty affiliation. The Pennsylvania colonists contrived suspicions of Joseph Fox conducting skeptical relations with the colonial loyalists at the outbreak of British Philadelphia campaign. The Fox family rock architecture was rebuilt by a son Joseph Jr. after the departing of Joseph Justinian Fox in 1779.

In 1808, George Fox inherited the rural settlement citing the property as Champlost. George augmented his education and social consciousness during his occupation of Paris in the 18th century. George was alluded by the French aristocracy seen as an expression by the landscapes of Champs-Élysées and Louis period architecture. The Yonne, Burgundy exploit of revolutionary France inspired the development to what was too become known as Champlost being a French country estate in north rural area of Philadelphia.

Benjamin Franklin, a colonial agent of the Pennsylvania Assembly, departed the mid-atlantic colony for a transatlantic crossing to England regarding a redress of the British Crown taxation policies in 1765. Franklin had numerous documents and writings which required safekeeping while in transit for the Pennsylvania colony. Franklin appealed to Joseph Galloway and Joseph Fox to secure the hand written artifacts while conducting diplomacy and international relations in England.

The Champlost and Growden Mansion estates were preferential repositories for the safekeeping of The Papers of Benjamin Franklin during the timeline of the American Revolution. Champlost had the accommodations of a multi-story livery stable featuring an upper garret serving as an obscure cockloft for safekeeping of artifacts pertaining to the founding of colonial America. Benjamin Franklin's artifacts remained at Champlost until Fox family descendent Charles Pemberton Fox relinquished the Franklin historical chronicles to the American Philosophical Society in 1840.

== See also ==
- Champlost
- Château
- Foxburg, Pennsylvania
- Foxburg Country Club
- Franklin Bache
- Henry D. Gilpin
- Samuel Rhoads
- Jared Sparks

== Franklin Papers Archives regarding Joseph Fox in British Colonial America ==
- "Report of Viewers of a Road in the Northern Liberties, [April 1745]". Founders Online. U.S. National Archives and Records Administration. April 1745.
- "Agreement about the Road, [April 1745]". Founders Online. U.S. National Archives and Records Administration. April 1745.
- "Deed of Settlement of the Philadelphia Contributionship, 25 March 1752". Founders Online. U.S. National Archives and Records Administration. March 25, 1752.
- "Pennsylvania Assembly Committee: Report on Laws, 15 February 1754". Founders Online. U.S. National Archives and Records Administration. February 15, 1754.
- "Pennsylvania Assembly Committee: Report on the Western Bounds, 7 March 1754". Founders Online. U.S. National Archives and Records Administration. March 7, 1754.
- "Some Account of the Pennsylvania Hospital, [28 May 1754]". Founders Online. U.S. National Archives and Records Administration. May 28, 1754.
- Morris, Robert Hunter (December 1, 1755). "Robert Hunter Morris to the Provincial Commissioners, 1 December 1755". Founders Online. U.S. National Archives and Records Administration.
- Hayes, William (January 3, 1756). "William Hays to Robert Hunter Morris and the Provincial Commissioners, 3 January 1756". Founders Online. U.S. National Archives and Records Administration.
- Peters, Richard (December 26, 1756). "Richard Peters to the Provincial Commissioners, 26 December 1756". Founders Online. U.S. National Archives and Records Administration.
- "To Benjamin Franklin from Pennsylvania Assembly Committee of Correspondence, 1 November 1764". Founders Online. U.S. National Archives and Records Administration. November 1, 1764.
- Franklin, Benjamin (February 24, 1766). "From Benjamin Franklin to Joseph Fox, 24 February 1766". Founders Online. U.S. National Archives and Records Administration.
- Franklin, Benjamin (March 1, 1766). "From Benjamin Franklin to Joseph Fox, 1 March 1766". Founders Online. U.S. National Archives and Records Administration.
- "To Benjamin Franklin from the Pennsylvania Assembly Committee of Correspondence, 19 October 1770". Founders Online. U.S. National Archives and Records Administration. October 19, 1770.
- Bond, Thomas (April 27, 1780). "Thomas Bond to Benjamin Franklin, 27 April 1780". Founders Online. U.S. National Archives and Records Administration.

== Bibliography ==
- Roberts, Ellwood (April 10, 1900). "Plymouth Meeting; Its Establishment and the Settlement of the Township with Historical, Genealogical and Biographical Data from Records of Friends". HathiTrust Digital Library. Norristown, Pennsylvania: Roberts Publishing Company. OCLC 2933684.
- Rosengarten, Joseph George (1903). "Some New Franklin Papers: A Report by J.G. Rosengarten, to the Board of Trustees" [Reprinted from the University of Pennsylvania Alumni Register, July, 1903]. HathiTrust Digital Library. United States Library of Congress. LCCN 03027374.
- Hays, Isaac Minis (1908). "Calendar of the papers of Benjamin Franklin in the library of the University of Pennsylvania". HathiTrust Digital Library. University of Pennsylvania. OCLC 3404034.
- "Fox Family Papers, 1755-1969" (PDF). HSP.org ~ Philadelphia’s Library of American History. Historical Society of Pennsylvania. OCLC 122347603.
- "Foxburg History". AlleghenyRiverStone.org ~ Allegheny RiverStone Center for the Arts. Allegheny RiverStone Center.
