= Growden =

Growden may refer to:

- Grace Growden Galloway (1727–1782), wife of loyalist Joseph Galloway
- Greg Growden (c.1960–2020), Australian sports journalist
- Growden Memorial Park, park in Fairbanks, Alaska, United States
