= Graeme Park =

Graeme Park may refer to:

- Graeme Park (DJ)
- Graeme Park (Horsham, Pennsylvania), historic site
