= Elizabeth Graeme Fergusson =

American poet

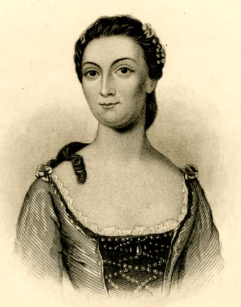
- Born: 3 February 1737; Horsham, Province of Pennsylvania, British America
- Died: 23 February 1801 (aged 64); Billet at Hatboro, near Graeme Park, Pennsylvania, US
- Spouse: Hugh Henry Fergusson (m. April 21, 1772)
- Writing career
- Notable works: The Dream, 1768

Elizabeth Graeme Fergusson, or Betsy Graeme; (February 3, 1737 – February 23, 1801) was an American poet and writer, known for The Dream (1768). She held literary salon gatherings called "attic evenings", based upon French salons. Her attendees included Jacob Duché, Francis Hopkinson, Benjamin Rush, and her niece, Anna Young Smith. She wrote poetry and a wide range of works, taught writing, and mentored women writers, like Annis Boudinot Stockton and Hannah Griffitts.

After her sister Jane's death, Elizabeth raised and educated her niece Anna Young Smith and her nephew. She also raised her sister, Ann Graeme Stedman's, children after her death.

In 1772, she married a Scotsman, Hugh Henry Fergusson, who spent much of their first five years of marriage abroad. When he returned to the Philadelphia area by September 1777, Elizabeth asked General George Washington to give him a pass so that he could return to her at her estate, Graeme Park. Denied, Fergusson accepted the offer of General William Howe, Commander of the British land forces, to be a commissary to patriot prisoners in Philadelphia. He was charged with treason and banned from America. Elizabeth decided to stay in Pennsylvania and her estate was confiscated for her husband's treasonous activities and her attempts to get Washington to give up the war and have the colonies enter into a peace settlement.

== Early years and works ==
Elizabeth Graeme, the sixth of nine children born to Dr. Thomas and Ann Diggs Graeme, spent much of her youth at Graeme Park, the family estate in Horsham, Pennsylvania, located outside of Philadelphia. Her mother, Ann Diggs, was the stepdaughter of colonial governor William Keith. Ann educated Elizabeth, teaching her to read and write, needlework, and social graces. Her father taught her Latin, German, and Greek. He also shared his impressions of the Scottish Enlightenment. She was taught French by a tutor in Philadelphia and also learned Italian. Elizabeth was rare among other colonial girls for receiving an education in the classics. Although there were no public schools for children, she was among upper-class Quakers, who were more likely to make a good education available for girls. Beginning at age 15, Elizabeth wrote to entertain her readers. She shared her works — like songs, vers de société, witty yarns, and travel chronicles — with her friends.

== Young adult, guardian, and poet ==
Elizabeth was engaged to Benjamin Franklin's son William in 1757. The father and son went to England and Elizabeth's relationship with William ended in 1759, as desired by both families.

After the death of her sister (Jane), Elizabeth became the guardian and educator of her niece, Anna Young Smith, and nephew. Elizabeth encouraged the poetic talents of Anna, introducing her to the literary circles of Philadelphia. Anna's poem An Ode to Gratitude was dedicated to Elizabeth as a sign of her gratefulness.

In 1764, Elizabeth traveled to London at the urging of her mother, whose health was failing. Another reason to travel to London was to lift her spirits from the recent breakup. There until 1765, she met esteemed literary and scientific people. In London, Elizabeth met Laurence Sterne and King George III. While she was in England, she kept a travel journal, which was later circulated and read among her peers in Philadelphia.

While in England, Elizabeth learned that her mother died on May 29, 1765. Back at Graeme Park, Elizabeth assumed the role of female head-of-household. Ann Graeme Stedman, her sister, died soon after their mother, and Elizabeth raised Ann's children. Elizabeth was then her father's lone surviving child.

Aside from writing poetry, Elizabeth's main literary project was the translation of François Fénelon's Les Aventures de Télémaque from the original French. She worked on it from 1765 to 1768, in part to manage her depression after losing her mother and sister. In the same time period, she wrote The Dream of the Philosophical Farmer about the wisdom of banning the import of British goods.

== Salon gatherings ==
She hosted "attic evenings"—salon gatherings for her elite male and female acquaintances which was among the earliest American salons. The Oxford Companion to women's writing in the United States said it was "the most distinguished intellectual salon in British America." The weekly meetings were based upon the French salon. Talented writers like Jacob Duché, Hannah Griffitts, Francis Hopkinson, Benjamin Rush, Anna Young Smith, and Annis Boudinot Stockton attended her gatherings.

== Poet and writer ==
Her poems showed her emotional side. One of her longest and most emotional poems was Il Penseroso or The Deserted Wife. The poem had four parts: hope, solitude, doubt, and adversity. The poem traces the progress of her grief as she feels abandoned by her husband. In part one, Fergusson is angry at her husband, Hugh, because he deserted her but, more importantly, because there were rumors he had impregnated a servant. Eventually, Ferguson realizes that she is not alone in her anger and grief. She realizes that she has many things in common with other loyalist women such as Grace Growden Galloway. In the second part of her poem, she writes "My Shattered Fortunes I with calmness Bore / A Loss in Common but with thousand more".

She is known for the mentorship that she provided to Hannah Griffitts, Susanna Wright, Annis Boudinot Stockton, and sisters Elizabeth Willing Powel and Mary Willing Byrd. Biographer David S. Shields said, "No other author did as much to encourage womens' [sic] writing in the eighteenth-century America."

== Marriage ==
Elizabeth met the younger Scot, Henry Hugh Fergusson (b. 1748), and they were married on April 21, 1772, in Philadelphia, without her father's knowledge or approval. Hugh left Philadelphia for Scotland in the summer. Her father knew that the couple wanted to marry, and he suggested they wait until Hugh returned from Scotland. Elizabeth's father died on September 4, 1772, of a stroke, never having learned of his daughter's marriage. By September 21, having not heard from her husband, Elizabeth made a public announcement of her marriage, as advised by John Dickinson, a lawyer.

In September 1775, Hugh went to England on personal business, and from there sailed for Jamaica in February 1776. He arrived in New York on July 19, 1777. (Note: He arrived one day before General William Howe, Commander of the British land forces, sailed from Staten Island to Chesapeake Bay on July 20, 1777. Hugh sailed with Howe.) Hugh arrived in Germantown by September 29, when Elizabeth sent a letter to General George Washington asking for his assistance to allow Hugh to return to their home at Graeme Park, 12 miles (19 km) north of Germantown along a southwest branch of the Neshaminy Creek. She stated that her husband had not participated in the war and would not aid the enemy. Washington did not give him a pass. Hugh was appointed by General Howe to work in Philadelphia as the commissary of prisoners. In June 1778, Hugh went with the British army to New York. He was charged with treason and when he was banned from America, he sailed for London. He never returned to Elizabeth, and she did not move to England as her husband asked. In 1777 and 1778, Elizabeth carried a letter from Jacob Duché, at her husband's urging, that requested that Washington give up the fight against the British and end the war and she tried to bribe an official to arrange for a peace settlement. Graeme Park was confiscated in 1779 for her and her husband's loyalist activities.

== Confiscation of Graeme Park ==
In 1779, Elizabeth was forced to vacate the property and for two years lived with various acquaintances and family members. Elizabeth Ferguson wrote letters to get help regaining her property after it was confiscated. These letters tended to be forceful and vigorous in order for her to get the help she needed.

Her father left the property at Graeme Park in her name, though under colonial law, Elizabeth was a feme covert, meaning that all of her property belonged to her husband when they were married. Since Hugh was abroad, she petitioned the government in 1781 to act as a surrogate patriarch and return the estate to her.

After two years of petitioning the government, Elizabeth finally regained the right to her property and moved back to Graeme Park in 1781. In 1791, however, Elizabeth could no longer afford the upkeep of the property and was forced to sell.

== Later years and death ==
For the final ten years of her life, Elizabeth lived with friends and wrote voraciously, publishing some of her poetry and participated in the writing of commonplace books with a number of her female acquaintances, such as Hannah Griffitts.

As her health declined, she was cared for by Betsy Stedman. Elizabeth died February 23, 1801, at the Billet at Hatboro, Pennsylvania. Elizabeth is buried on the south side of the churchyard of Christ Church in Philadelphia. Some of her siblings and her parents were buried at the cemetery.

== Bibliography ==
- Ousterhout, Anne M. (2003). The most learned woman in America : a life of Elizabeth Graeme Fergusson. University Park: Pennsylvania State University Press. ISBN 978-0-271-02311-3.
