= Anna Young Smith =

American poet

- Born: Anna Young; 5 November 1756; Philadelphia, Province of Pennsylvania, British America
- Died: 3 April 1780 (aged 23)
- Other name: Sylvia
- Known for: Poet
- Notable work: Ode to Gratitude; On Reading Swift's Works; An Elegy to the Memory of American Volunteers
- Spouse: William Smith
- Children: 3
- Parents: James Young; Jane Graeme Young
- Relatives: Elizabeth Graeme Fergusson (aunt); Dr Thomas Graeme (grandfather)

Anna Young Smith (1756–1780) was an American poet from Philadelphia. Her early poetic efforts were encouraged by her aunt, Elizabeth Graeme Fergusson, and she went on to circulate her writing within Philadelphia's literary coteries. Smith's notable works include Ode to Gratitude, On reading Swift's Works, and An Elegy to the Memory of American Volunteers. She died aged 23 and most of her poems were published posthumously.

== Biography ==
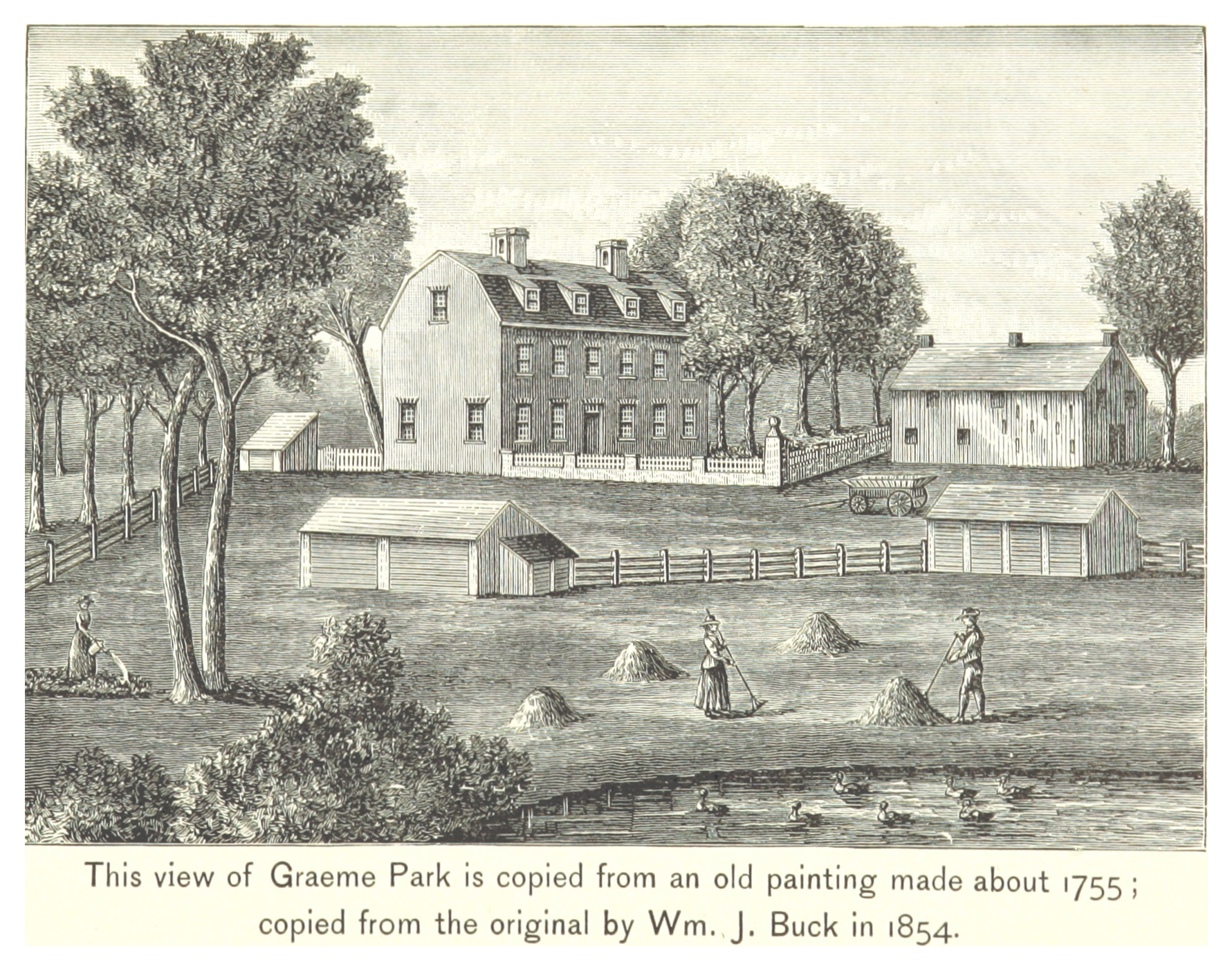
Graeme Park in 1755.

Anna Young Smith was born on 5 November 1756 in Philadelphia to James and Jane Graeme Young. James Young was a merchant of Philadelphia and held positions in government. He and Jane Graeme Young had four children, two of whom died in infancy. Anna Smith, then Anna Young, was their eldest child and only daughter. Just two years after Smith was born, her mother died. Smith and her brother were subsequently raised and educated by their aunt Elizabeth Graeme Fergusson at Graeme Park. Fergusson hosted a weekly salon at Graeme Park, and it was here where Smith was introduced to influential writers as a child. Fergusson also encouraged Smith's own literary ambitions. Smith expressed her appreciation in Ode to Gratitude, the earliest surviving of her works. It was written when she was 13 and is dedicated to Fergusson.

By 1772, Smith had relocated to the city to live with her father. She began sharing poems within Philadelphia's literary circles in 1773 having adopted the pseudonym "Sylvia". In 1775, Smith married Dr. William Smith at Graeme Park. It was reported that her father did not consent to the marriage. Together they had three children.

Fergusson's commonplace book records Smith's death, stating "this dear child died April 3, 1780". She was only 23 years old. It is unknown what exactly was the cause of her death, but it may have been complications due to the birth of her third child.

== Writing ==
Most of Smith's surviving works were written prior to her marriage. Her poetry focusses on common themes, such as friendship, love, grief, and nature. She also wrote about political matters. Fergusson described her as "a warm Whig" due to her standpoint on the American Revolution. Smith wrote of her support for the patriot side of the War in Elegy to the Memory of the American Volunteers (1775). This work was popular among readers and was recommended for publication in the Pennsylvania Magazine, therefore becoming the only work to be printed during Smith's lifetime. Smith's writing also explored the fair treatment of women. In her poem On Reading Swift's Works, she praises Jonathan Swift's "perfect style" but condemns him for reprimanding "helpless women", writing "Ungenerous bard, whom not e'en Stella's charms / Thy vengeful satire of its sting disarms! / Say when thou, dipp'st thy keenest pen in gall, / Why must it still on helpless women fall?"

Fifteen of Smith's poems were copied into Fergusson's commonplace book, which dates from around 1787. Eight poems were printed in the Universal Asylum and Columbian Magazine after Smith's death.

== Selected works ==
- Ode to Gratitude
- Occasional Verses on the Anniversary of the Death of Dr. Thomas Graeme
- On Reading Swift's Works
- An Elegy to the Memory of American Volunteers
