= Ethan Allen Andrews (biologist) =

American biologist

Ethan Allen Andrews (September 10, 1859, New York City – October 17, 1956, Baltimore, Maryland) was an American biologist. He received the degree of Ph.B. from Yale in 1881 and of Ph.D. from Johns Hopkins in 1887. He took post-graduate studies at Yale, studied at the Polytechnicum of Hannover, Germany, and, as a fellow, at Johns Hopkins, where he was appointed assistant professor of biology in 1887, associate professor in 1892, and professor of zoology in 1908. He was president of the Society of American Zoologists in 1904. He contributed on biological subjects to various journals. Andrews was married to zoologist Sara Gwendolen Foulke.
