= William Parker Foulke =

American lawyer

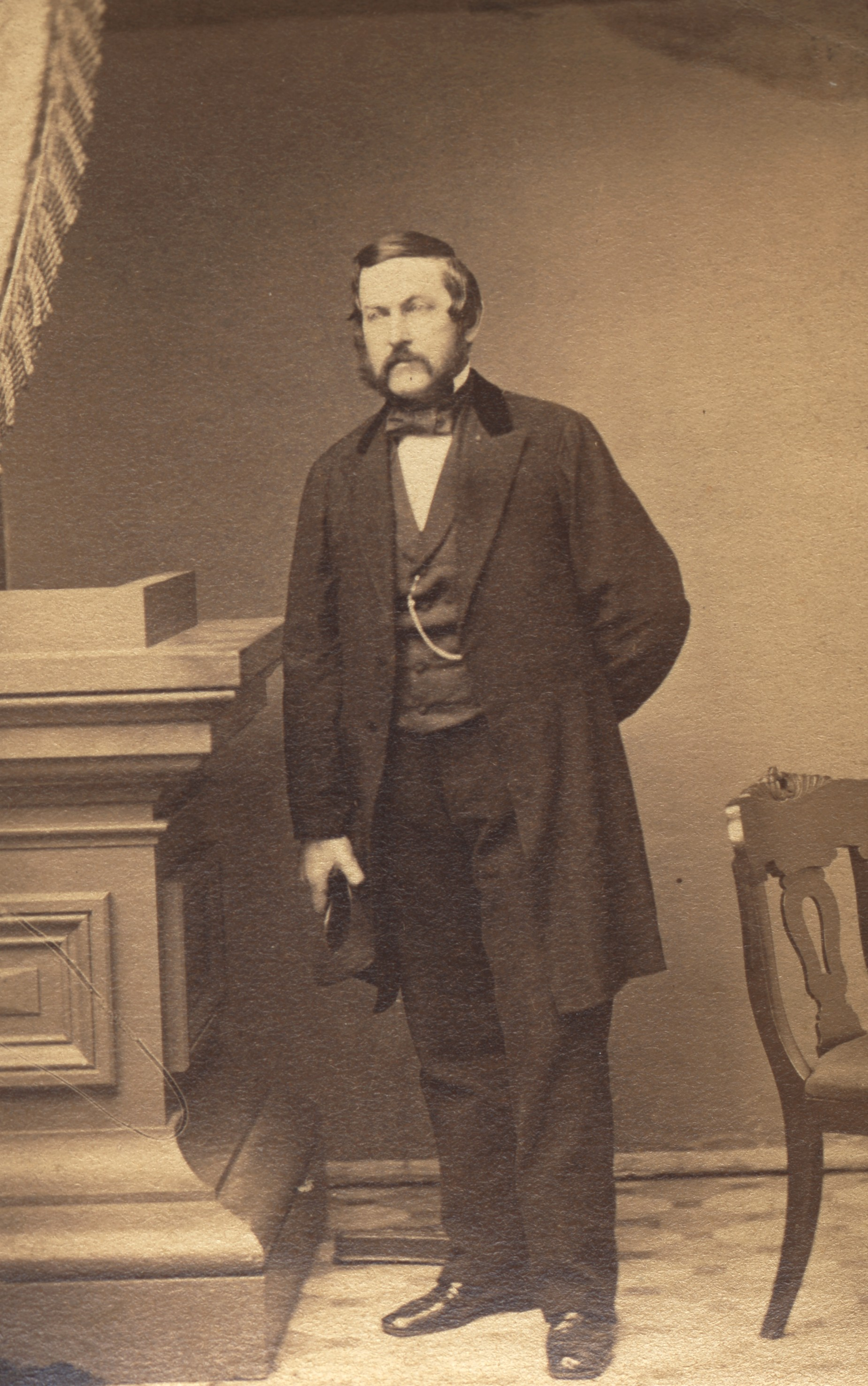
Portrait of Foulke

William Parker Foulke (1816–1865) discovered the first full dinosaur skeleton in North America (Hadrosaurus foulkii, which means "Foulke's big lizard") in Haddonfield, New Jersey, in 1858.

== Early life and education ==
Foulke was born in Philadelphia, in 1816, to descendants of Welsh Quakers who emigrated in 1698. His father, William Parker Foulke, was an abolitionist, prison reformer, pamphleteer, philanthropist, lawyer, historian, and geologist, the last of which directly led to the discovery, which was partially named for him by Joseph Leidy and for which he is now best-known.

Foulke was admitted to the Pennsylvania bar in 1841.

== Career ==
In 1845, he began an association with the two reforms that would occupy so much time and energy in his short life. Sensitized to the problems of incarceration through his legal training, Foulke joined the Philadelphia Society for Alleviating the Miseries in Public Prisons in July 1845.

Foulke spent several years comparing alternative disciplinary models and writing on correctional issues in the Journal on Prison Discipline and Philanthropy. Following a tour of mid-Atlantic correctional institutions in 1847 and 1848, Foulke was instrumental in erecting the new Lancaster County Prison, and contributed materially to later penitentiaries in several other counties in Pennsylvania. He was associated with the American Association for Improvement of Prison Discipline and the Convention of State Prison Wardens.

Foulke also supported the Pennsylvania Colonization Society, an antislavery organization that resettled as many as 1,000 freed slaves per year in West Africa (Liberia). Despite mounting opposition from different sides, Foulke never wavered in his support for resettlement until his own death in 1865, by which time he was vice-president of the Society.

Foulke financially supported the American Academy of Music, and was a member of the Academy of Natural Sciences (Philadelphia), the Historical Society of Pennsylvania, and, like his grandfather John Foulke (1757–1796), the American Philosophical Society.

He was an avid natural historian and geologist, supportive of the first arctic explorations.

== Family ==
In 1855, Foulke married Julia DeVeaux Powel (died 1884), daughter of Col. John Hare Powel, with whom he had seven children. One of his children was the biologist Sara Gwendolen Foulke. He died on June 18, 1865.
