= John Foulke =

American Physician

John Foulke (1757–1796) was an American physician and Quaker.

Foulke was born into the Quaker family of Mary and Judah Foulke in Philadelphia. He began his studies at the College of Philadelphia, graduating with his M.D. in 1780. That same year, he sailed with George Fox to Europe to continue his education, arriving in Paris with a recommendation letter addressed to Benjamin Franklin, America’s Minister to France at that time. Foulke then visited Germany, Holland, and London after the Revolutionary War.

In 1784, he was elected as a member of the American Philosophical Society. Returning to Philadelphia, Foulke became active in the American Philosophical Society, serving as secretary in 1786. At that time, he became equally active in his medical career: he served on the staff of the Pennsylvania Hospital, became a fellow of the College of Physicians, and held lectures on pneumatics and anatomy. During one of his lectures, he even exhibited a hot air balloon like the one he had seen in France. In 1793, Dr. Foulke helped identify the outbreak of yellow fever in Philadelphia alongside Dr. Benjamin Rush, and dedicated himself fully to treating patients throughout the city as the disease spread. he saw one of the first recorded cases of yellow fever alongside Dr. Hugh Hodge. Foulke died a few years later, but his scientific spirit was passed down to future generations of Foulkes: his grandson, William Parker Foulke, discovered the first full dinosaur skeleton in North America.

He is buried in the Friends Arch Street Meeting House Burial Ground in Philadelphia. he saw one of the first recorded cases of yellow fever alongside Dr. Hugh Hodge.
