= George Fox (physician) =

George Fox (27 November 1759–September 1828) was an American Quaker medical doctor.

== Early life ==
George Fox was the son of Joseph Fox and Elizabeth née Mickle born in Philadelphia. He began attending the University of Pennsylvania in either 1773 or 1775, though allegedly he never graduated. He married Mary Pemberton, the only daughter of Charles and Ester (née House) Pemberton, in 1789 at the Arch Street Meeting House. Together, they had three children: Charles Pemberton Fox (1792-1866), Eliza Mary Pemberton Fox (1794-1873), and Esther Pemberton Fox (1797-1798). Mary died after twelve years of marriage in 1801. Fox then married Mary Dickinson, daughter of General Philemon Dickinson in 1803. The two only had one child, Joseph Dickinson Fox (1804-1825)

== False death ==
In 1780, Fox gained a large inheritance from his late father and sailed to Europe with John Foulke. He stayed there for the next three years. During his travels, he fell ill at a chateau near Saint-Florentin, Yonne, Burgundy, and his host quickly removed him to Paris for treatment, where Fox allegedly died. Most absurdly, the Capuchin monks tasked with his burial supposedly resurrected him. Fox later renamed his family estate, Champlost, after the French Chateau where he initially fell ill.

== Later life ==
Fox became a close friend to William Temple Franklin, grandson and Paris-based secretary of Benjamin Franklin. After the passing of both Franklins, many of the senior Franklin’s letters were inherited by Fox (most of which eventually came into the American Philosophical Society’s care via Fox’s son, Charles P. Fox). After returning to Philadelphia in 1783, Fox became a prominent man in political affairs: he worked as representative for Philadelphia to the State Assembly (1800). He was elected as a member to the American Philosophical Society in 1784. He acted as a director of the Bank of the United States (starting in 1799 or 1812). He served as trustee of his alma mater from 1789 to 1791, whereupon he retired the position only to return from 1812 until his “final” death in 1828.
