= Joseph Galloway =

American politician (1731–1803)

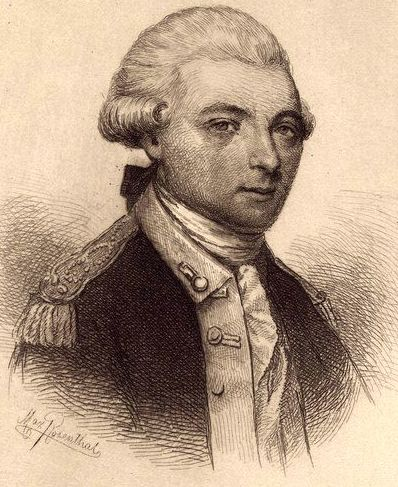
- Etching of Joseph Galloway

Member of the First Continental Congress from Pennsylvania
- In office September 5, 1774 – October 26, 1774 Serving with Edward Biddle; John Dickinson; Charles Humphreys; Thomas Mifflin; John Morton; Samuel Rhoads; George Ross

Member of the Pennsylvania Provincial Assembly
- In office 1776–1776

25th & 27th Speaker of the Pennsylvania Provincial Assembly
- In office 1769–1774
- Preceded by: Joseph Fox
- Succeeded by: Edward Biddle
- In office 1766–1769
- Preceded by: Joseph Fox
- Succeeded by: Joseph Fox

Personal details
- Born: 1731 West River, Province of Maryland, British America
- Died: August 29, 1803 (aged 71–72) Watford, Hertfordshire, England
- Spouse: Grace Growden Galloway (m. 1753)
- Relations: Samuel Galloway III (cousin)
- Profession: lawyer; politician

Joseph Galloway (1731—August 29, 1803) was an American attorney and a leading political figure in the events immediately preceding the founding of the United States in the late 18th-century. As a staunch opponent of American independence, he would become one of the most prominent Loyalists in North America during the early part of the Revolutionary War.

The son of a wealthy landowner, Galloway became close friends with Benjamin Franklin through his law studies in the late 1740s. His association with Franklin and his father-in-law's relationship with the Penn family drew him into the political drama then unfolding in the American colonies. Galloway was elected to the Pennsylvania Provincial Assembly in 1756 when he was just 25. He would go on to serve for 18 years, eight of them as assembly speaker.

In 1774, Galloway led the Pennsylvania delegation in the First Continental Congress in Philadelphia, where as a conservative he proposed a plan for forming a union between the colonies and Great Britain. After the Congress failed to adopt his Plan of Union, he signed the Continental Association, an agreement uniting the colonies in a boycott of British goods. Unhappy with the radical directions being taken, Galloway quit the Assembly and refused election to the Second Continental Congress in May 1775. Remaining loyal to the king, he opposed the adoption of the Declaration of Independence the next year.

Three months after the Declaration's signing, Galloway fled to New York to join the British. As a top advisor to William Howe, the commander-in-chief of British forces in North America, he provided crucial intelligence, assisted in planning attacks on Continental Army troops, and personally recruited upwards of 80 spies. With the capture of Philadelphia in September 1777, Howe appointed Galloway to govern the city as Superintendent of both Police and Port.

When the British abandoned Philadelphia in June 1778, Galloway escaped to England and was convicted of high treason in absentia by the Pennsylvania Assembly; his estates were confiscated. Through the end of the war, Galloway was a leader of the loyalist cause in exile, a group of between 80,000 and 100,000 displaced colonists. He would never return to the Americas, nor again see his wife whom he had left behind in hopes of recovering his properties.

== Early life ==
Galloway was born near West River, Anne Arundel County, Maryland, the son of Peter Bines Galloway and Elizabeth Rigbie. Galloway was a fourth generation Marylander, his Quaker forebears arriving in the colonies in 1649. In 1740, he moved with his father to Pennsylvania where he received a liberal schooling. He studied law, for a time alongside William Franklin, the son of Benjamin Franklin and later a fellow Loyalist, and he was admitted to the bar and began to practice law in Philadelphia.

On October 18, 1753, Galloway married Grace Growdon. In doing so, he relinquished his place in the Quaker faith. Her father, Laurence Growdon, was even wealthier than the Galloways and well placed in the political and social lives of Philadelphia. Both Galloway and his wife had strong personalities, and consequently, theirs was an unhappy union.

== Political career ==
Galloway was a member of the Pennsylvania Provincial Assembly from 1756 to 1774 and served as speaker of the House from 1766 to 1774. He was a prominent member of the faction which opposed Pennsylvania being a proprietary colony of the Penn family, and he called for it to be turned into a crown colony. He was a Loyalist, believing that most Americans would prefer to remain loyal to the Crown if only they were given a legitimate and effective government that would inspire their loyalty.

Galloway was a member of the Continental Congress in 1774, where he proposed a compromise plan for Union with Great Britain which would provide the colonies with their own parliament subject to the Crown. The Continental Congress rejected it by one vote. He signed the Continental Association, while he was opposed to independence for the Thirteen Colonies and remained loyal to the king. He was a resident of Philadelphia and an associate of Benjamin Franklin with whom he corresponded over the issues of American independence. In 1768, he was elected to the American Philosophical Society, which Franklin founded, and served as vice president of the organization from 1769 to 1776.

Galloway urged reform of the imperial administration and was critical of the trade laws, the Stamp Act of 1765, and the Townshend Acts enacted in 1767, and he had a conciliatory plan to end the disputes between Britain and the colonies. He believed that the British had the right to tax and govern the colonies, keep the peace, and help the colonies to survive and flourish. Congress voted to expunge Galloway's plan from their journal, so he published it himself in 1775, reprimanding Congress for ignoring his analysis of Parliament's powers and colonial rights. He proposed a written constitution and joint legislature for the whole British Empire.

== American War of Independence ==
In 1775, the Assembly rejected Galloway's urging that it abandon its struggle for independence from Britain, so Galloway left the Assembly and the Congress. In the winter of 1777, he joined General William Howe and accompanied him on his Philadelphia campaign. During the British occupation of Philadelphia, he was appointed superintendent of police and headed the civil government. He efficiently organized the Loyalists in Philadelphia, but the British were driven out of the city in 1778 following France's entry into the war. The British retreated to New York, and Galloway went with them.

When Benjamin Franklin departed for France in 1776, he left behind a chest of his papers, containing letters and manuscripts, and entrusted them to Galloway for safe keeping in his personal residence, Trevose Manor, just north of Philadelphia. At some point between 1776 and 1778, Trevose Manor was raided; some of Franklin's papers were stolen, while others were left scattered around as a result of the raid. The identities of the raiders were disputed, and modern historians note that no concrete information exists as to their identity.

== Exile in Britain ==
In 1778, he fled to Britain with his daughter Elizabeth, never to return to the United States. There, he would become a leading spokesman of American Loyalists in London. The General Assembly of Pennsylvania convicted him of high treason and confiscated his estates, which included Trevose Manor, now known as Growdon Mansion, and much of the land that is now Bensalem Township, Pennsylvania. In 1779, he appeared as a government witness in a parliamentary enquiry into the conduct of Lord Howe and General Howe during the Philadelphia Campaign, of which he was deeply critical. When Galloway fled Philadelphia with the British, his wife Grace remained in the city with the hope of retaining the rights of their property (her ancestral property). They expected that she would be able to join her daughter and husband afterwards, but Charles Willson Peale evicted her.

Galloway was influential in convincing the British that a vast reservoir of Loyalist support could be tapped by British initiatives, thus setting up the British invasion of the American South. After the war, he spent his remaining years in religious studies and writing. He died a widower in Watford, Hertfordshire on August 29, 1803; his wife had died on February 6, 1782.
