= Sara Gwendolen Foulke =

American zoologist, marine biologist and poet

- Born: 26 June 1863; Bala Farm, Chester County, Pennsylvania, U.S.
- Died: 13 December 1936 (aged 73); Baltimore, Maryland, U.S.
- Resting place: Laurel Hill Cemetery, Philadelphia, Pennsylvania, U.S.
- Other names: Gwendolen Foulke Andrews; Richard De Veaux
- Education: Bryn Mawr College; University of Pennsylvania
- Occupations: zoologist, marine biologist and poet
- Known for: research into protoplasm
- Notable work: The Living Substance as such: and as Organism; The poems of Richard De Veaux.

Sara Gwendolen Foulke (26 June 1863 – 13 December 1936) was an American zoologist, marine biologist and poet. She worked on microscopic water inhabiting animals and her obituary described her work as "genius."

== Biography ==
Foulke was born at Bala Farm, Chester County, Pennsylvania, to Julia DeVeaux Powel (daughter of John Hare Powel) and her husband, William Parker Foulke. She was initially educated at private schools and subsequently attended Bryn Mawr College and the University of Pennsylvania. Further into her career she studied and undertook research at Woods Hole Oceanographic Institution and at the Station biologique de Roscoff.

During the 1880s, Foulke focused her research on infusoria and rotifers, microscopic water inhabiting animals. She published a number of scientific articles on the subject. She also assisted Edward Potts by providing scientific illustrations for his publication Fresh water sponges; a monograph. Later she became interested in investigating the behaviour and form of protoplasm. In 1897, Foulke published an article titled The Living Substance as such, and as Organism in the Journal of Morphology. This article was initially criticised. Later in life Foulke developed an interest in child and animal psychology. However, by the time of her death, this work was regarded by her obituary writer Henry Van Peters Wilson, as a work of "genius".

== Death and publication of her book of poetry ==
Foulke died on 13 December 1936 at the age of 73 due to a heart attack at her home in Baltimore. She was interred at Laurel Hill Cemetery in Philadelphia. After her death, her husband published her poems in a two volume set under her pseudonym Richard De Veaux.

== Family ==
In 1894 Foulke was married to biologist Ethan Allen Andrews. The couple had three children.

== Selected publications ==
- Sara Gwendolen Foulke (1884). "Some Phenomena in the Life-History of Clathrulina elegans". Proceedings of the Academy of Natural Sciences of Philadelphia. 36 (3): 17–19. ISSN 0097-3157. JSTOR 4060940. Wikidata Q106953254.
- Sara Gwendolen Foulke (1884). "On a New Species of Rotifer, of the Genus Apsilus". Proceedings of the Academy of Natural Sciences of Philadelphia. 36 (3): 37–41. ISSN 0097-3157. JSTOR 4060957. Wikidata Q106953266.
- Sara Gwendolen Foulke (October 1884). "XXXIV.—Some phenomena in the life-history of Clathrulina elegans". Annals and Magazine of Natural History. 14 (82): 268–270. doi:10.1080/00222938409459807. ISSN 0374-5481. Wikidata Q56117742.
- Sara Gwendolen Foulke (1885). "XXV.—Chilomonas paramœcium". Annals and Magazine of Natural History. 16 (94): 260–261. doi:10.1080/00222938509459880. ISSN 0374-5481. Wikidata Q99846861.
- Sara Gwendolen Foulke (1885). "XLV.—Trachelius ovum". Annals and Magazine of Natural History. 16 (96): 477–478. doi:10.1080/00222938509459914. ISSN 0374-5481. Wikidata Q99846875.
- Sara Gwendolen Foulke (January 1886). "An endoparasite of Noteus". Annals and Magazine of Natural History. 17 (97): 85–86. doi:10.1080/00222938609460116. ISSN 0374-5481. Wikidata Q56118009.
- Sara Gwendolen Foulke (1897). "The Living Substance as such: and as Organism". Journal of Morphology. 12 (2): 1–176. ISSN 0362-2525. Wikidata Q116070122.
