= John Hare Powel =

American politician (1786–1856)

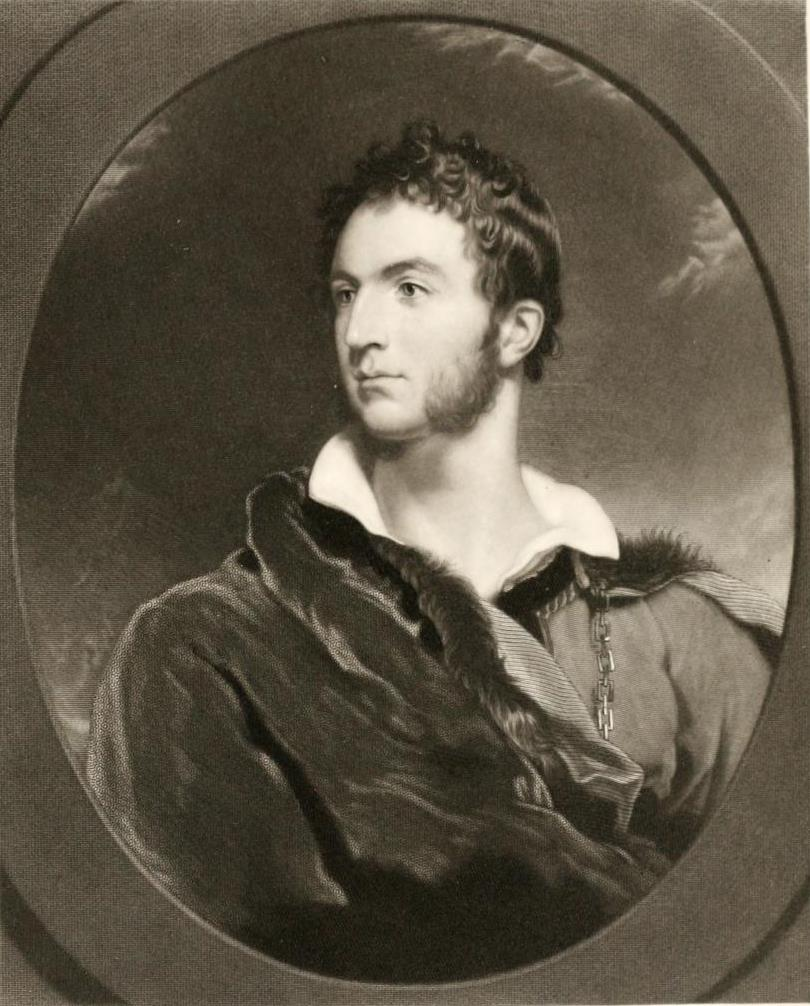
- Portrait of John Hare Powel, an 1810 portrait of Powel by Thomas Lawrence

Member of the Pennsylvania Senate for the 1st district
- In office 1827–1830
- Preceded by: George Emlen
- Succeeded by: William Boyd

Personal details
- Born: April 22, 1786 Philadelphia, Pennsylvania, US
- Died: June 14, 1856 (aged 70) Newport, Rhode Island, US
- Party: Federalist
- Education: Academy and College of Philadelphia

John Hare Powel (April 22, 1786 – June 14, 1856) was an American agriculturist, politician, art collector, and philanthropist from Pennsylvania.

== Early life and education ==
Powel was born in Philadelphia, Pennsylvania, on April 22, 1786, the youngest of the six children of Robert and Margaret Willing Hare. As a youth, he was adopted by his mother's widowed and childless sister, Elizabeth Willing Powel, a prominent Philadelphia socialite. He legally changed his name when he attained his majority, and inherited the immense fortune of his late uncle, Samuel Powel, the last mayor of Philadelphia in the colonial era.

He was educated at the Academy and College of Philadelphia.

== Career ==
After college, he joined a counting house, where he traveled to Calcutta, India, and returned at age 22 with $22,000 as his share of the profit.

From 1809 to 1811, he served as Secretary of the American Legation in London, under William Pinkney, then the minister of England.

In 1811, he returned to the United States, and joined the Pennsylvania militia, serving as Brigade-Major under Thomas Cadwalader at Camp Dupont. During the War of 1812, he was Inspector-General of the Pennsylvania militia and held the rank of colonel in the U.S. Army, and served as Inspector-General, from December 1814 to June 1815.

After the war, he devoted himself to agriculture, and did much to improve the breeding of cattle and sheep in the United States. He founded the Pennsylvania Agricultural Society in 1823, and published Memoirs of the Pennsylvania Agricultural Society (1824) and Hints for American Farmers (1827).

In the 1830s, he acquired land around present-day Locust Street, around 13th Street, in Center City Philadelphia

From 1826 to 1835, he was one of the charter trustees for Lafayette College in Easton, Pennsylvania.

=== Pennsylvania State Senate ===
He served as a Federalist member of the Pennsylvania State Senate for the 1st district from 1827 to 1830.

The Powels built a massive Greek-Revival mansion and estate in West Philadelphia, overlooking the Schuylkill River. The mansion was named "Powelton" and was designed by the architect William Strickland. In 1851, Powel sold Powelton to the Pennsylvania Railroad Company. The railroad kept 30 acres along the river and sold the rest for development of residential housing. The mansion was demolished in 1885, and the estate developed as the neighborhood Powelton Village.

== Personal life ==
In 1817, he married Julia de Veaux of South Carolina, the daughter of Andrew Deveaux, a prominent Loyalist during the American Revolution. Together, they had nine children, seven of whom survived to adulthood, including John Hare Powel Jr. (1837–1890), who served as lieutenant colonel of the 9th Rhode Island Infantry during the American Civil War, colonel of the Artillery Company of Newport from 1865 to 1877, and mayor of Newport, Rhode Island from 1886 to 1888. One of his daughters, Julia De Veaux Powel, married William Parker Foulke and was the mother of the biologist Sara Gwendolen Foulke.

=== Death ===
Powel died in Newport, Rhode Island, and is interred at the Christ Church Burial Ground in Philadelphia.

== Legacy ==
- Powell Hall at Lafayette College in Easton, Pennsylvania, is named in his honor.
- Powelton Village, the neighborhood in Philadelphia built on the former Powelton estate, is named in honor of the Powel family

== Notes ==
Pennsylvania State Senate
Preceded by George Emlen	Member of the Pennsylvania Senate, 1st district 1827-1830	Succeeded by William Boyd
