= Growden Mansion =

Historic house in Pennsylvania, United States

- Trevose Manor
- U.S. National Register of Historic Places
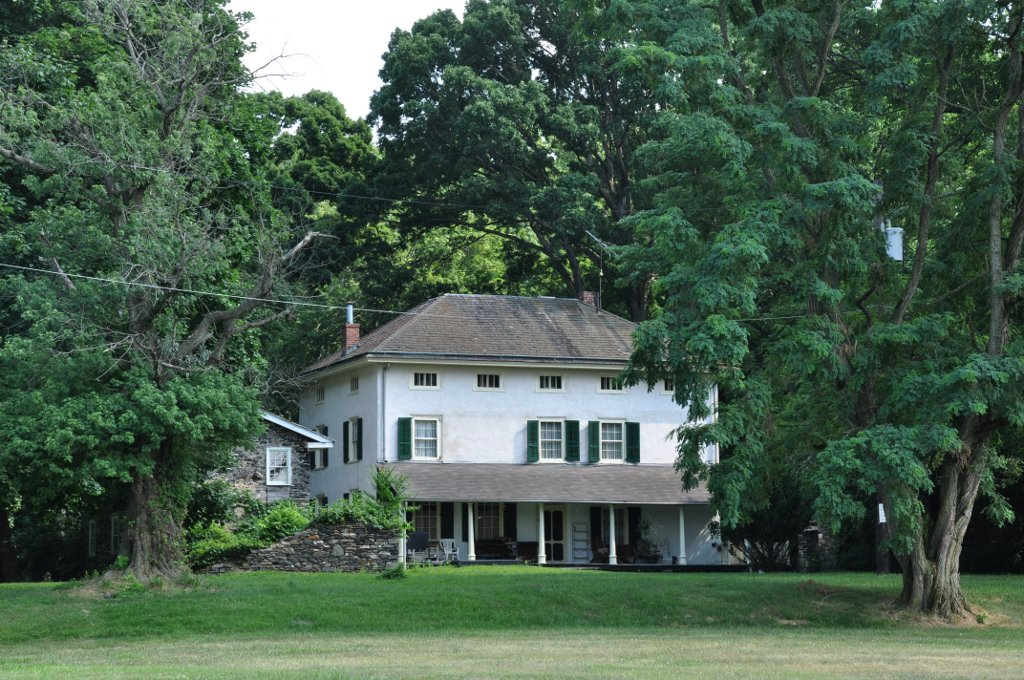
- Growdon Mansion, July 2012

- Location within Pennsylvania Location within the United States
- Location: 5408 Neshaminy Valley Drive, Bensalem, Pennsylvania
- Coordinates: 40°08′50.71″N 74°56′8.73″W
- Built: 1681-1685
- Architectural style: English manor
- NRHP reference No.: 76001607
- Added to NRHP: May 24, 1976

Growdon Mansion, also known as Trevose Manor, is a local historical landmark in Bensalem Township, Pennsylvania, United States. It played an important role in early Bucks County history. The mansion sits along the Neshaminy Creek in Bensalem, a township that borders the northeast section of Philadelphia, in the northeastern United States.

It was listed on the National Register of Historic Places in 1976.

== History ==
The history of Growdon Mansion dates back to the late 17th century, around October 24, 1681, when Cornish father Lawrence Growdon and his son Joseph Growdon, a rich pewterer family from St Merryn, purchased about 5,000 acres (20 km^{2}) from William Penn. In 1683 Joseph Growdon settled on this land and built "The Manor of Bensalem" for their family. Joseph Growdon had a son, Lawrence Growdon, born on March 14, 1693. He then had two daughters, Elizabeth who married Thomas Nickleson of Philadelphia, and Grace Galloway who married Joseph Galloway, a loyalist politician. Grace and Joseph Galloway inherited the land on October 18, 1753, and inherited three tracts of land, Trevose, Belmont (Bensalem, Pennsylvania), and Richelieu in Bensalem township containing a total of 1,425 acres and four tracts in Durham Township containing iron mines and furnaces. The Growdons also acquired property in Bristol (as Lawrence Growdon was named the Merchant of Bristol in 1730) and Philadelphia, from Front to 4th Streets, along Lombard St.

Since women could not own property during that time, Joseph Galloway became the sole proprietor. Joseph Galloway, a Tory (British Loyalist), left for England mid-war to seek sanctuary once the war turned in favor of the Colonists. Joseph took their daughter Elizabeth with him to England, and Grace stayed behind to wage an extensive fight to retain the properties in which they (she) had inherited. She kept an in-depth diary of the struggles and hardships that she faced and was particularly concerned with the descent from financial and social standing both in her husband's absence and upon being forcibly evicted from her home in August 1778. She had refused to submit to the condition of acknowledging the Patriot rule and renounce her Loyalist ties to receive a pension. A member of one of the wealthiest and most notable families of her day, her reputation was ruined by her marriage to Galloway—it was guilt by association once he showed his Torry colors. She noted in her will that those properties should be passed on to her daughter, Elizabeth (Betsey), upon her death. Grace Growdon died on February 6, 1782, and Joseph Galloway died on August 29, 1803. Their daughter Elizabeth then had inherited the land and sold it in 1848, when the house again underwent major changes.

Galloway was good friends with William Franklin, Benjamin Franklin's son. Franklin often visited him at his many estates, traveling 25 miles to Trevose from Philadelphia on horseback or by carriage. While a local legend maintains that Franklin performed his famous kite-flying experiment at Growdon Mansion to prove that lightning was the same as static electricity, the broader consensus is that Franklin flew his kite closer to his home in Philadelphia. Other significant historical figures such as George Washington and John Adams have also stayed at the mansion.

== Current status ==
The Growdon property developed over time and was considered to be one of the strongest and most unusual manors of its day. The home is now operated as a museum by the Historical Society of Bensalem Township. It includes an outbuilding called "The Vault" where the early deeds and county records, as well as papers of Benjamin Franklin, used to be stored.
