= Graeme Park (Horsham, Pennsylvania) =

Historic house in Pennsylvania, United States

- U.S. National Register of Historic Places
- U.S. National Historic Landmark
- Pennsylvania state historical marker
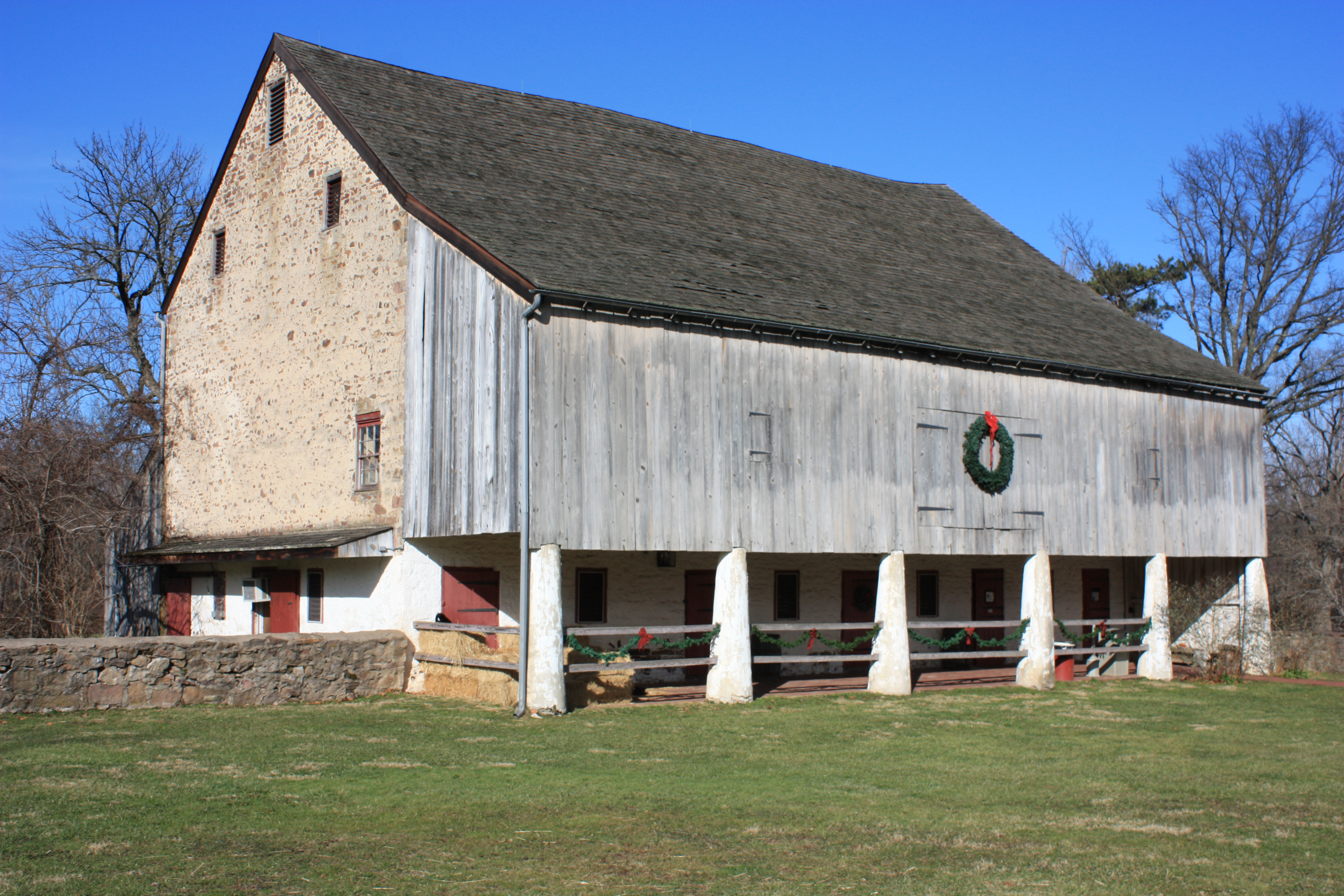
- Barn at Graeme Park

- Location within Pennsylvania
- Location: 859 County Line Rd., Horsham, Montgomery County, Pennsylvania, U.S.
- Coordinates: 40°13′00″N 75°09′00″W
- Area: 140 acres (57 ha)
- NRHP reference No.: 66000672

Significant dates
- Added to NRHP: October 15, 1966
- Designated NHL: October 9, 1960
- Designated PHMC: 1965

Graeme Park is an historic site and National Historic Landmark at 859 County Line Road in Horsham, Pennsylvania, United States. It is owned by the Pennsylvania Historical and Museum Commission and operated by the non-profit group, The Friends of Graeme Park. It is the only surviving residence of a colonial-era Pennsylvania governor.

Graeme Park was constructed in 1722 by Sir William Keith as a summer residence and alternative to his governor's mansion at Shippen House on Second and Spruce Streets in Philadelphia. The house, originally known as Fountain Low, has been largely unchanged since its construction except for a restoration by Thomas Graeme in the mid-18th century and a minor restoration by the Pennsylvania Historical and Museum Commission in the 1960s.

== Timeline ==
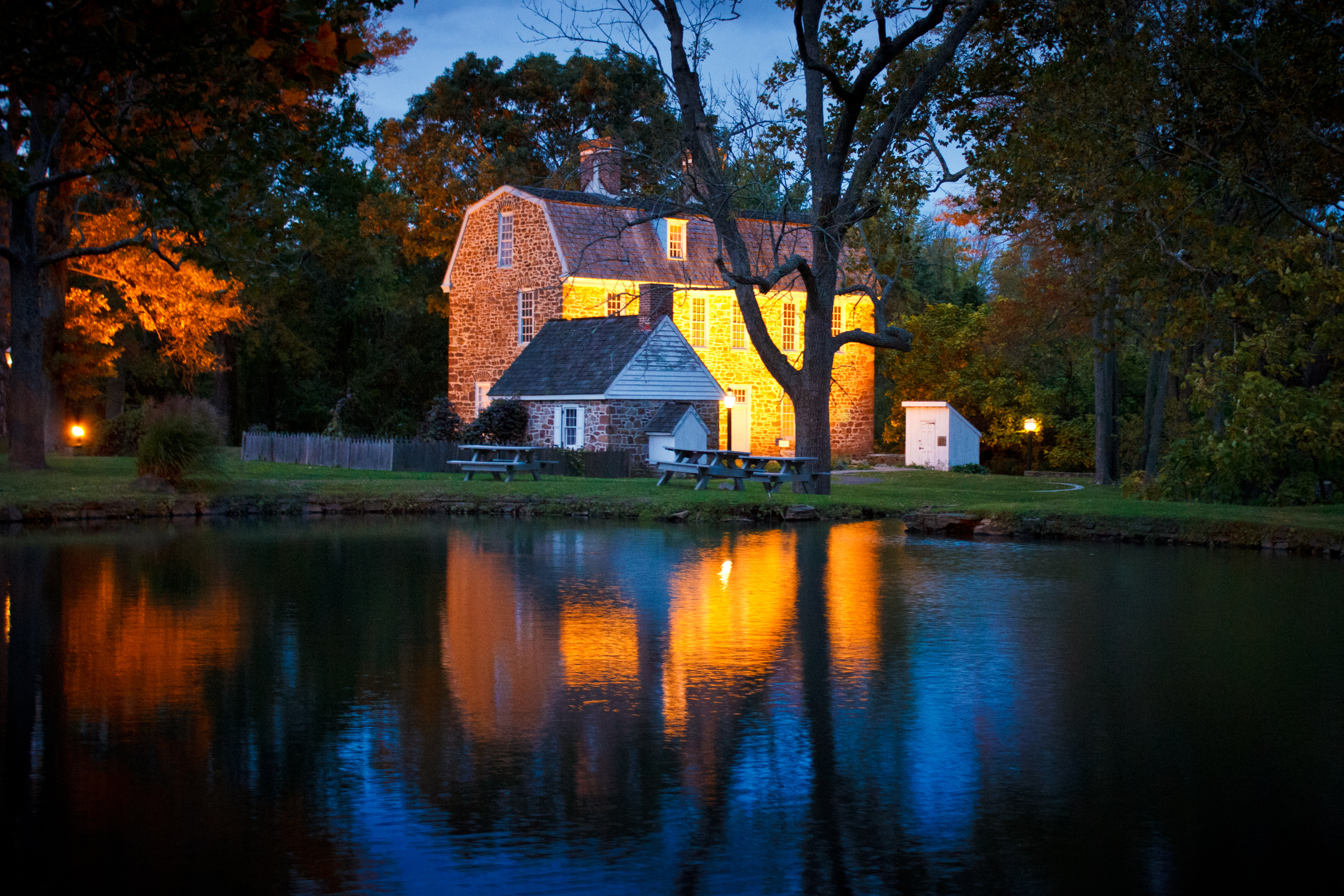
Keith House in 2010

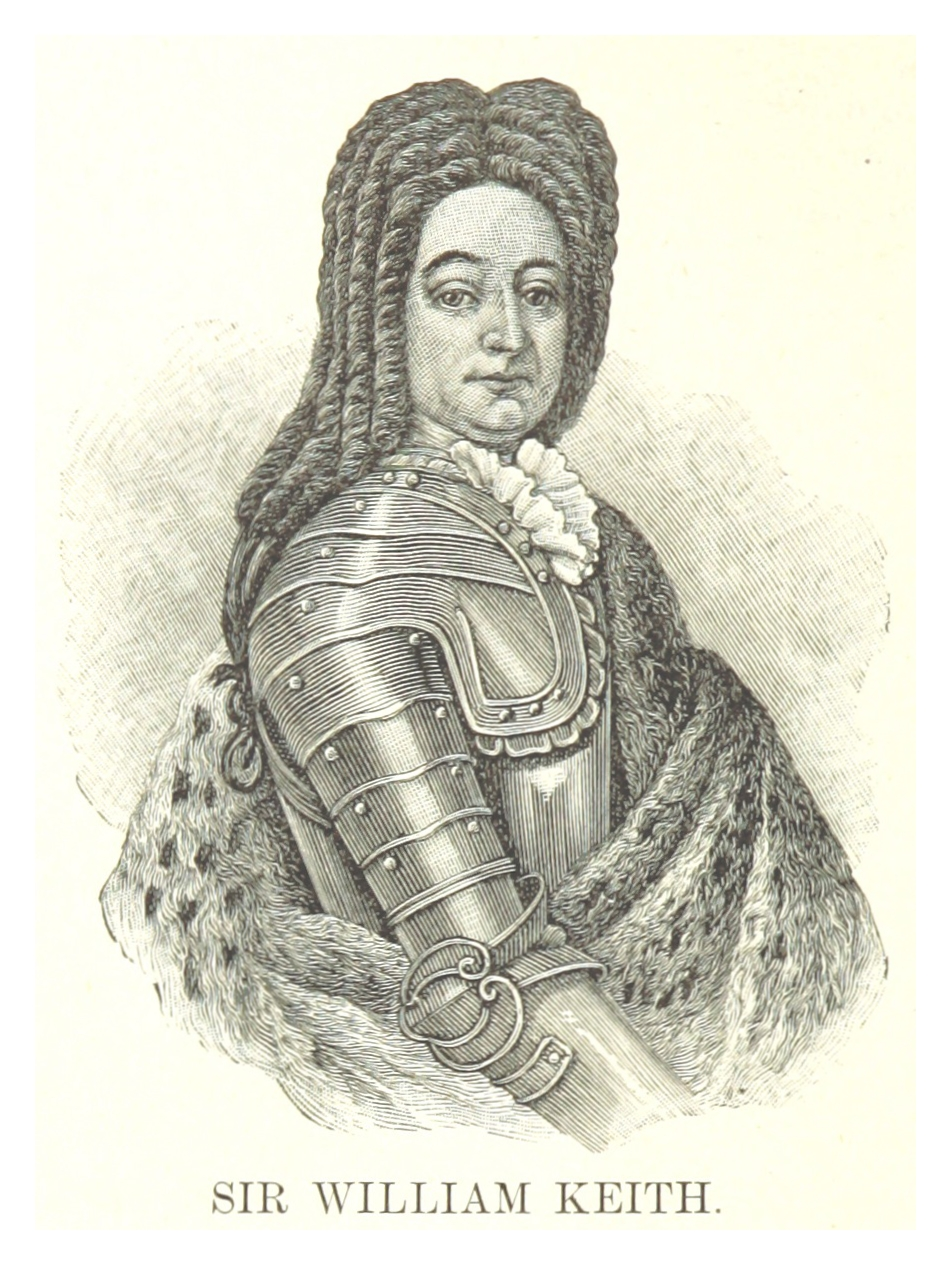
Sir William Keith

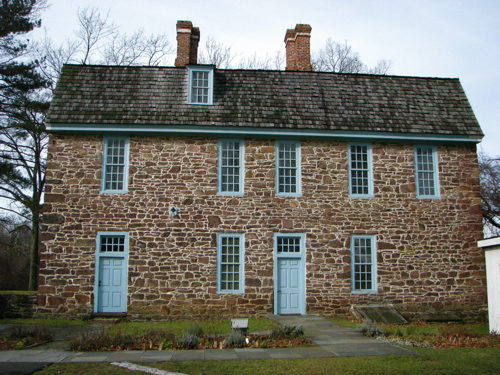
The Keith House

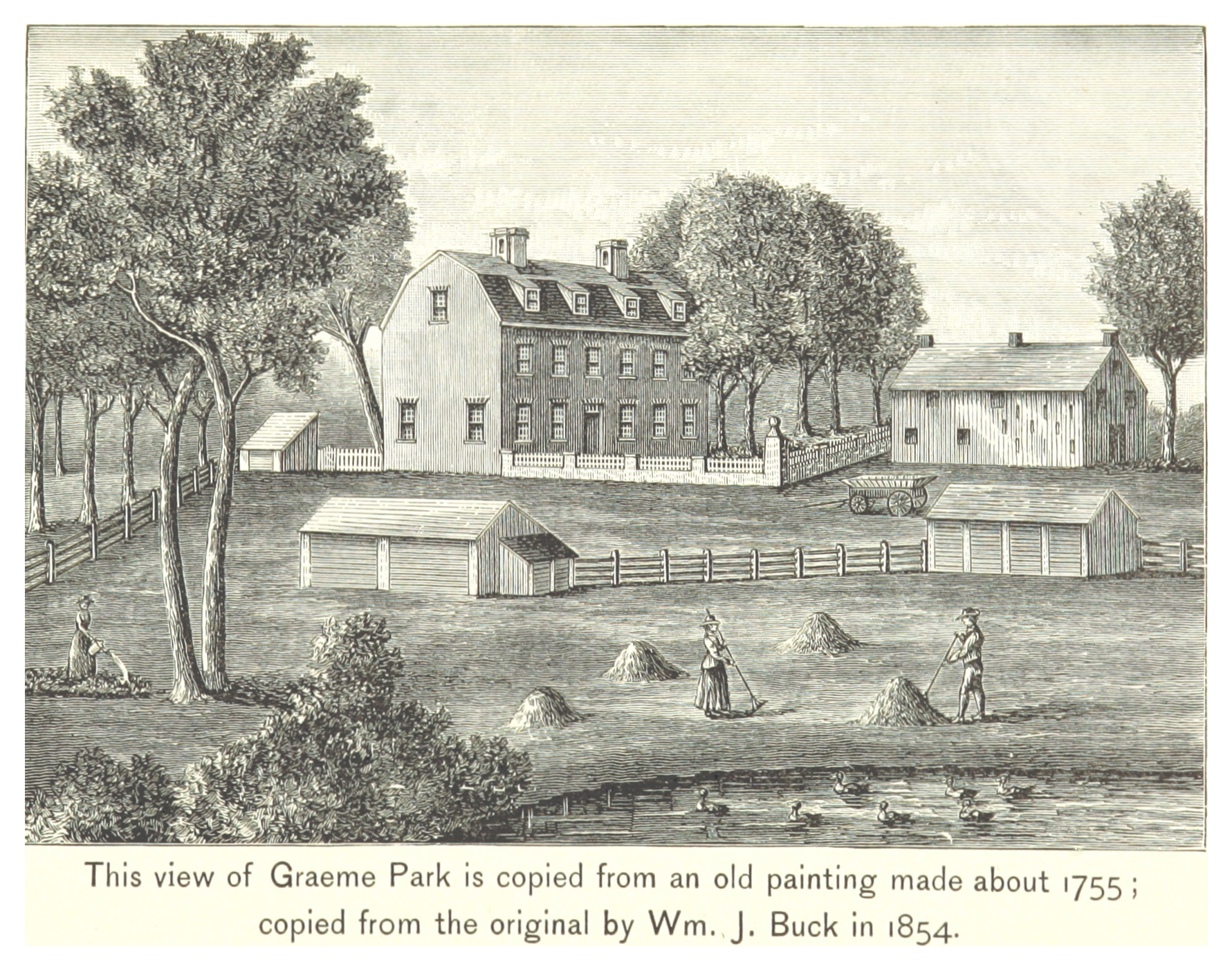
Graeme Park in 1755

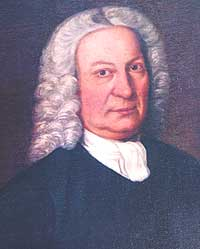
Dr. Thomas Graeme

=== 1721 ===
Construction of the malthouse begins.

A malthouse is a building in which brewers create malt by starting the germination process of barley or other grains. The malt is then used as a key ingredient in the making of beer, ale and malt liquor. This malthouse was one of several attempted commercial ventures undertaken by Sir William Keith during his term as governor of Colonial Pennsylvania. His other businesses included a copper mine located west of the Susquehanna River in disputed territory and a foundry on the Christiana River near New Castle, Delaware. The malthouse was constructed during a time of financial complications between Great Britain and her American colonies. Trade was slowed tremendously and supplies of grain were rotting on the idled ships in the colonial ports in cities like Philadelphia. Keith took advantage of the need to have the grain processed and malting the grain was a good way to preserve it for a time.

=== 1722 or 1723 ===
Construction on the mansion at Graeme Park begins.

Graeme Park was originally called "Fountain Low" by Sir William Keith, its builder and first resident. It is also known as the "Keith House" in his honor. Fountain Low was built on 1,700 acres (690 ha) of land that Keith acquired as governor. He received the land for little or no cost as a debt payment given to the Provincial government of Pennsylvania by the estate of Samuel Carpenter, who had died with a considerable debt owed to the colony. Over 90 workmen worked to complete Fountain Low and its surrounding buildings. Keith even got the Provincial government to extend two roads to his property in Horsham. Evidence points to the assumption that Governor Keith rarely occupied Fountain Low, but instead spent the majority of his time at the governor's mansion in Philadelphia. The interior of the mansion was not painted until Dr. Thomas Graeme took ownership in 1739.

=== 1739 ===
Dr. Thomas Graeme acquires the property at Fountain Low and renames it "Graeme Park".

Dr. Graeme was the husband of Ann Diggs who was the stepdaughter of Sir William Keith. Graeme had arrived with Keith from England in 1717 and married Ann in 1719. During his years in Pennsylvania Graeme attained a significant social status in Philadelphia. He served as the Port Physician, was a consulting physician at the Pennsylvania Hospital, was appointed as a naval officer by Governor Keith in 1719, as a Register General and Master of Chancery in 1724. Graeme also served on the Provincial Council and the Supreme Court of Pennsylvania. Governor Keith had left Pennsylvania in 1728 and left trusteeship of his properties to his wife Lady Anne Keith and family. Dr. Thomas Graeme was one of the trustees. The estate was sold in 1738 to Joseph Turner, who then sold Fountain Low to Dr. Graeme in 1739. Graeme originally used the newly named Graeme Park as a summer residence and kept his primary residence in Carpenter's Mansion in Society Hill, Philadelphia.

=== 1755 ===
Dr. Graeme begins interior renovations at Graeme Park.

He installed decorative devices that were common during the Georgian era, including paneling and refinished several of the interior doors. These changes remain today at Graeme Park. Dr. Graeme also commissioned the construction of an outdoor kitchen, laid out a formal garden and began a 300 acres (120 ha) "Deer Park" to make it "a piece of Beauty and Ornament to a dwelling (that any English noble would be proud to have ... by his house." (Letter to Thomas Penn, 1755)

=== 1765 ===
Dr. Thomas Graeme retires from medical practice due to deteriorating health and the death of his wife Ann.

Following his retirement, Dr. Graeme began to spend a majority of his time at Graeme Park. Graeme's daughter Elizabeth assumes the role of hostess for the doctor's household. Although Graeme retired from medical work he did not retire from the Philadelphia social scene. Together with Elizabeth they hosted salons or gatherings of Philadelphia's most influential statesmen, writers and musicians. Elizabeth, herself, became a poet of some renown. Dr. Graeme also served as the President of St. Andrew's Society an organization of gentlemen Scottish immigrants in Philadelphia. He was elected to the American Philosophical Society and the American Medical Society. Dr. Graeme died of a heart attack while walking the grounds of Graeme Park on September 4, 1772. Ownership of the land was transferred to his daughter Elizabeth and her husband Henry Hugh Fergusson.

=== 1778 ===
Graeme Park is confiscated by the Continental Congress due to Henry Fergusson's loyalist sympathies during the American Revolution.

Elizabeth Graeme married Henry Fergusson on April 21, 1772, without her father's consent. This caused quite a problem for the newlyweds. Henry and Elizabeth had been introduced to each other by Dr. Benjamin Rush, a future founding father of the United States, on December 7, 1771, at one of the salons hosted by Elizabeth and Dr. Graeme. Fergusson was a recent and penniless Scottish Immigrant and he was eleven years younger than Elizabeth. Both of these qualities made him a less than ideal suitor for Elizabeth's hand in marriage and Dr. Graeme forbade that they marry. Four months after they met, Henry and Elizabeth married secretly in Old Swede's Church. Only their close friends attended, including Benjamin Rush, Provost William Smith and his wife. Despite her father's disapproval, Elizabeth had vowed to let her marriage be known. Ironically, the day on which she decided to tell him the news was the day that he suffered his fatal heart attack, with Elizabeth watching him approach Graeme Park through a window of the mansion. Elizabeth was never able to tell of her marriage. She was Dr. Graeme's only living heir, she inherited Graeme Park and by right of marriage Henry Fergusson gained title to the property. With his sudden new fortune Henry Fergusson was able to quickly ascend the Philadelphia society ladder. He traveled to England twice, became director of a prominent Philadelphia library and was awarded the title magistrate in Philadelphia. He was the last magistrate of Philadelphia under British colonial rule. He sailed once more for England in late 1775 just as the American Revolution was beginning to gather steam. He returned to Philadelphia by way of New York City as a loyalist with Sir William Howe commander of the British forces in American. With Howe, Fergusson witnessed the Battle of Brandywine and the occupation of Philadelphia during the Philadelphia campaign. Fergusson involved his wife in his activities by sending her as a messenger to General George Washington to ask for his surrender and to present a bribe to a major in the Continental Army. Both of these incidents caused the Patriots of Philadelphia to doubt her loyalty. There was no doubt about where Henry Fergusson's loyalties lay. He was found a traitor by the Supreme Executive Council of Pennsylvania and Graeme Park was seized under the Confiscation Act of 1778.

=== 1781–1795 ===
Graeme Park is returned to Elizabeth Graeme Fergusson and she lives there in peace until 1795.

Elizabeth Graeme Fergusson

Elizabeth Fergusson may have delivered some letters, for her husband's sake, that called her loyalty into question, but she remained a patriot throughout the Revolution. She regained Graeme Park in 1781 thanks to the support of several close and influential friends. Among these were Dr. William Smith, first president of the University of Pennsylvania, Robert Morris known as the financier of the Revolution, and Benjamin Rush, a signer of the United States Declaration of Independence and the man who introduced her to Henry Fergusson. Elizabeth was able to live the rest of her life in peace and quiet. She sold Graeme Park to a pharmacist from Bethlehem, Pennsylvania named William Smith. Elizabeth lived with her friends in Horsham until her death in 1801.

=== 1801–1920 ===
The Penroses care for Graeme Park

William Smith sold 200 acres (81 ha) of Graeme Park to Samuel Penrose of Richland Township including the original house, Keith Mansion, in April 1801. Samuel and his wife Sarah were members of Horsham Friends Meeting, the local Quaker congregation. They were the parents of 10 children, seven of which survived to adulthood. Their son William was married to Ann Larrett in 1810 and the Penrose built a second farmhouse at Graeme Park for the newlyweds. Samuel bought all of Graeme Park from his father in 1820 and with Sarah began the tradition of keeping Graeme Park in its original state while at the same time having a productive and profitable farm. When Samuel died in 1863 ownership was transferred to his third son, Abel Penrose. Abel and his wife, Sarah Beisel, continued to preserve Graeme Park for future generations. They even began to invite visitors to take tours of the former Governor's mansion. Morris Penrose was the fourth and final generation of the Penrose family at Graeme Park, beginning in 1893. He continued the tradition of hosting tours for school groups and historical societies. It was noted that 400 visitors walked to Graeme Park from the trolley stop on Easton Road in Horsham.

=== 1920–1958 ===
The Strawbridges care for Graeme Park

Morris Penrose sold 191 acres (77 ha) to Welsh Strawbridge on March 20, 1920. Strawbridge was an investment broker with the firm J&W Strawbridge. He was a prominent member of Philadelphia society, serving as Master of the Hounds for the Whitemarsh Hunt Club. Strawbridge married Miss Margaret Ely Marshall in 1922. They lived in the 1810 Penrose farmhouse and continued the Penrose tradition of preserving the Keith House and sharing its history with visitors.

In order to ensure the preservation of this historic mansion, the Strawbridges donated the Keith House and the surrounding area to the Pennsylvania Historical and Museum Commission in 1958.

=== 1958–present ===
Graeme Park as a Pennsylvania Historical Site

The PHMC did some minor restorative repairs to Graeme Park in the 1960s. The buildings and the grounds of Graeme Park appear in much the same state today as they did in colonial times. The original floor boards, paneling and paint from Dr. Graeme's restoration remain. They provide a glimpse into the world of Georgian architecture.

== Haunting legends ==
Since Elizabeth's death in 1801 it has been rumored by the citizens of Horsham, Pennsylvania that the Keith House and Graeme Park are haunted by her ghost. These local legends have been embraced by The Friends of Graeme Park, who perform annual lantern tours of the Keith House.
