= Grace Growden Galloway =

Grace Growden Galloway (1727–1782) was the wife of British loyalist Joseph Galloway. In the wake of the American Revolution, she faced severe hardships, including the confiscation of her property due to her husband's anti-independence stance, which led to the loss of her social standing and pride. Grace Galloway left behind a detailed diary documenting her daily life and her struggle to reclaim her property. This diary has become an important source for historians seeking to understand the experiences of female loyalists and provides a unique perspective on the Revolutionary War that had previously been underrepresented in historical accounts.

== Early life ==
Grace Growden, later known as Grace Galloway, was born in Pennsylvania in 1727. Her father, Lawrence Growden, was a prosperous businessman and influential figure, owning Durham Iron Furnace, serving on the Pennsylvania assembly, and amassing ten thousand acres of land. Despite this wealth and privilege, Grace's childhood was marked by loneliness and a challenging environment dominated by egotistical men.

In 1753, Grace married Joseph Galloway, who quickly rose to prominence as a lawyer and became a leading political figure in Pennsylvania. Following the death of Grace’s father, Joseph inherited her share of the family’s property, which included Trevose (Growden Mansion), Belmont, Richlieu, King's Place, and Durham Lands. The couple had four children, but only their daughter Elizabeth (Betsy) survived to adulthood.

== Before and during the American Revolution ==
Before the American Revolution, Grace Galloway was a prominent figure in Pennsylvania society, partly due to her husband’s significant political role as a loyalist. Joseph Galloway held a continuous seat in the assembly from 1757 to 1776 (except for 1764) and served as the Speaker of the House from 1766 to 1775. As the British position in the war weakened, the Galloways' social standing declined. Despite this, they remained steadfast in their loyalist convictions. Joseph was eventually removed from his position, and as the British situation deteriorated, he and Elizabeth sought refuge with the British, leaving Grace to defend and reclaim their land. Grace never reunited with her husband or daughter. Her staunch loyalism and abandonment by Joseph rendered her a social outcast, and she was deeply concerned about the damage to her family’s reputation.

== Diary ==
Grace Growden Galloway began keeping a diary the day after Joseph fled with the British. Initially intended to update her husband on her daily activities, the diary soon evolved into a means for Grace to record her emotions, conversations, and efforts to regain her daughter Betsy's inheritance. The diary documents her interactions with the Commissioners of Forfeited Estates, who had ordered the confiscation of loyalist properties, including the Galloway estate. Grace asserted her claim to the land, arguing that it had been willed to her, despite it legally belonging to Joseph. Her diary reflects the frustrations and challenges faced by loyalist women left behind.

== Post-Revolution ==
Following the revolution, Grace Growden Galloway lost her property, carriage, and social status but maintained a sense of superiority. She refused to vacate her home, leading the Supreme Executive Council to forcibly remove her and relocate a new tenant. Grace vigorously contested this, advocating that her punishment should not be linked to her husband's actions. Historian Carol Berkin notes that Grace sought to distance her fate from her husband's and challenged the penalties imposed on her. Despite her efforts, she lost this struggle, as her legal rights were nullified by both marriage and political changes. Grace felt humiliated by her reduced circumstances and the rejection of her requests for assistance.

In January 1779, Grace was offered the opportunity to repurchase her property, but doing so would have required her to acknowledge the authority of the state and potentially face charges of treason. She deliberated over this offer in her diary, ultimately deciding against reclaiming the property under those conditions. Grace died in 1782, bequeathing her estate to her daughter Betsy. Although she had no legal claim to do so, the Treaty of Paris in 1783 led to the partial return of the property to Betsy. After Joseph Galloway's death, the Pennsylvania Supreme Court ruled in favor of Grace, returning the full estate to her heirs. The estate is now managed as a museum by the Historical Society of Bensalem Township in Pennsylvania and is open to visitors.
