= Thomas Willing Francis =

American merchant

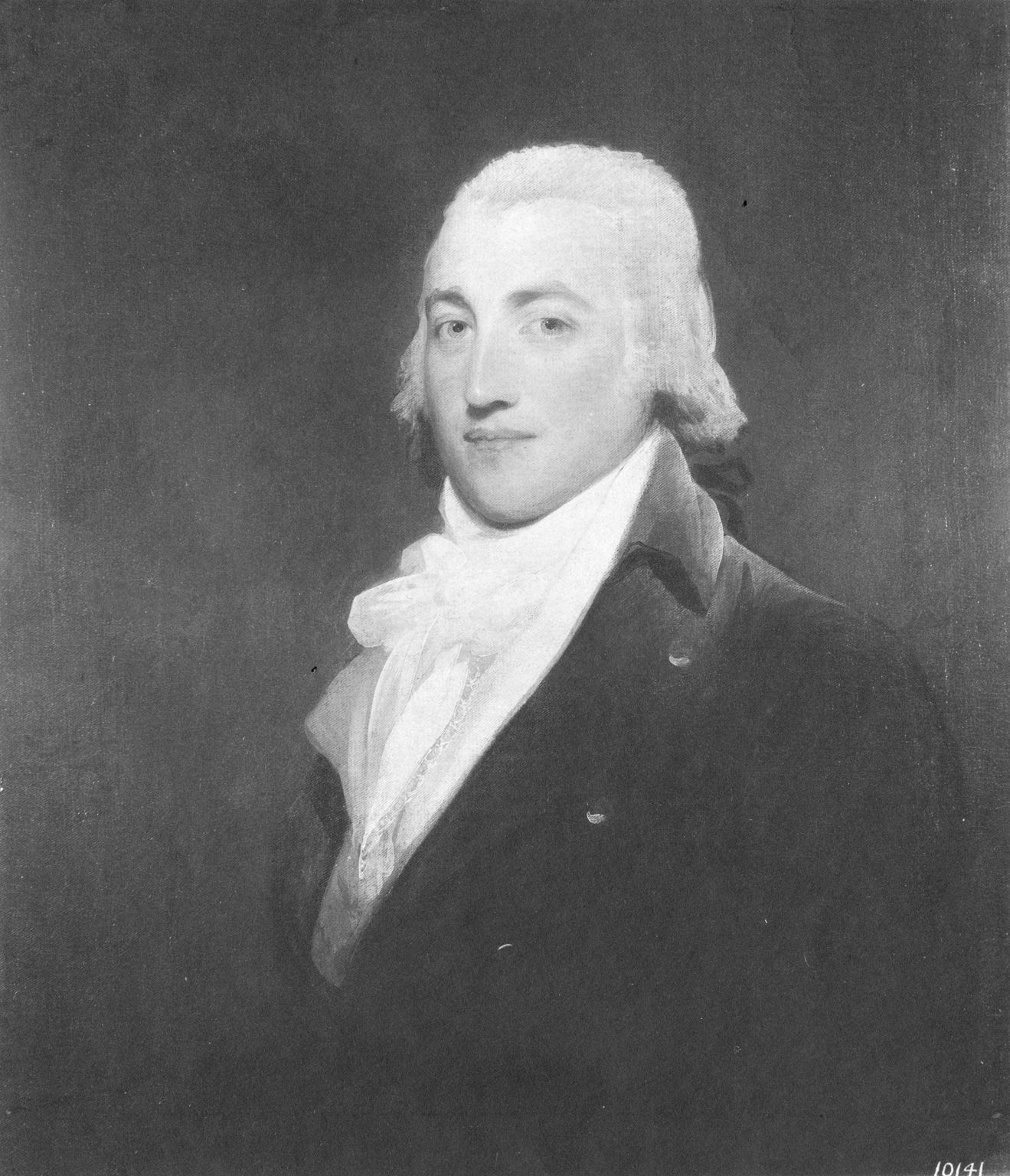
- portrait by Gilbert Stuart
- Born: August 30, 1767; Province of Pennsylvania, British America
- Died: June 2, 1815 (aged 47); Philadelphia, Pennsylvania, U.S.
- Occupation: Merchant
- Spouse: Dorothy Willing (m. 1794)
- Parent(s): Tench Francis Jr. Anne Willing Francis
- Relatives: Tench Francis Sr. (grandfather); Charles Willing (grandfather); Thomas Willing (uncle); James Willing (uncle); Turbutt Francis (uncle)

Thomas Willing Francis (August 30, 1767 – June 2, 1815) was a prominent American merchant.

== Early life ==
Francis was born in the Province of Pennsylvania, then a part of British America, on August 30, 1767, and named after his uncle. He was a son of Tench Francis Jr. (1730–1800) and Anne (née Willing) Francis (1733–1812). Among his siblings was older brother John Francis, who married a daughter of John Brown and was the father of John Brown Francis, a U.S. Senator and Governor of Rhode Island. For many years, his father was agent for the William Penn family in connection with their proprietary interests in provincial Pennsylvania, and served as the first cashier of the Bank of North America.

His paternal grandparents were Elizabeth (née Turbutt) Francis and Tench Francis Sr., the Attorney General of the Province of Pennsylvania. Among his extended family was uncle Turbutt Francis and aunt, Margaret Francis (wife of Chief Justice Edward Shippen IV). Among his first cousins were Tench Tilghman (an aide to George Washington) and Tench Coxe (a delegate to the Continental Congress). His maternal grandparents were Charles Willing, a British born Mayor of Philadelphia in the 1740s and 1750s, and his wife, Ann (née Shippen) Willing. His maternal grandmother was herself a granddaughter of Philadelphia mayor Edward Shippen. Among his large extended family were uncles Thomas Willing (the first president of First Bank of the United States and the Bank of North America) and James Willing, and aunts: Mary Willing (wife of William Byrd III) and Elizabeth Willing (wife of Samuel Powel).

== Career ==
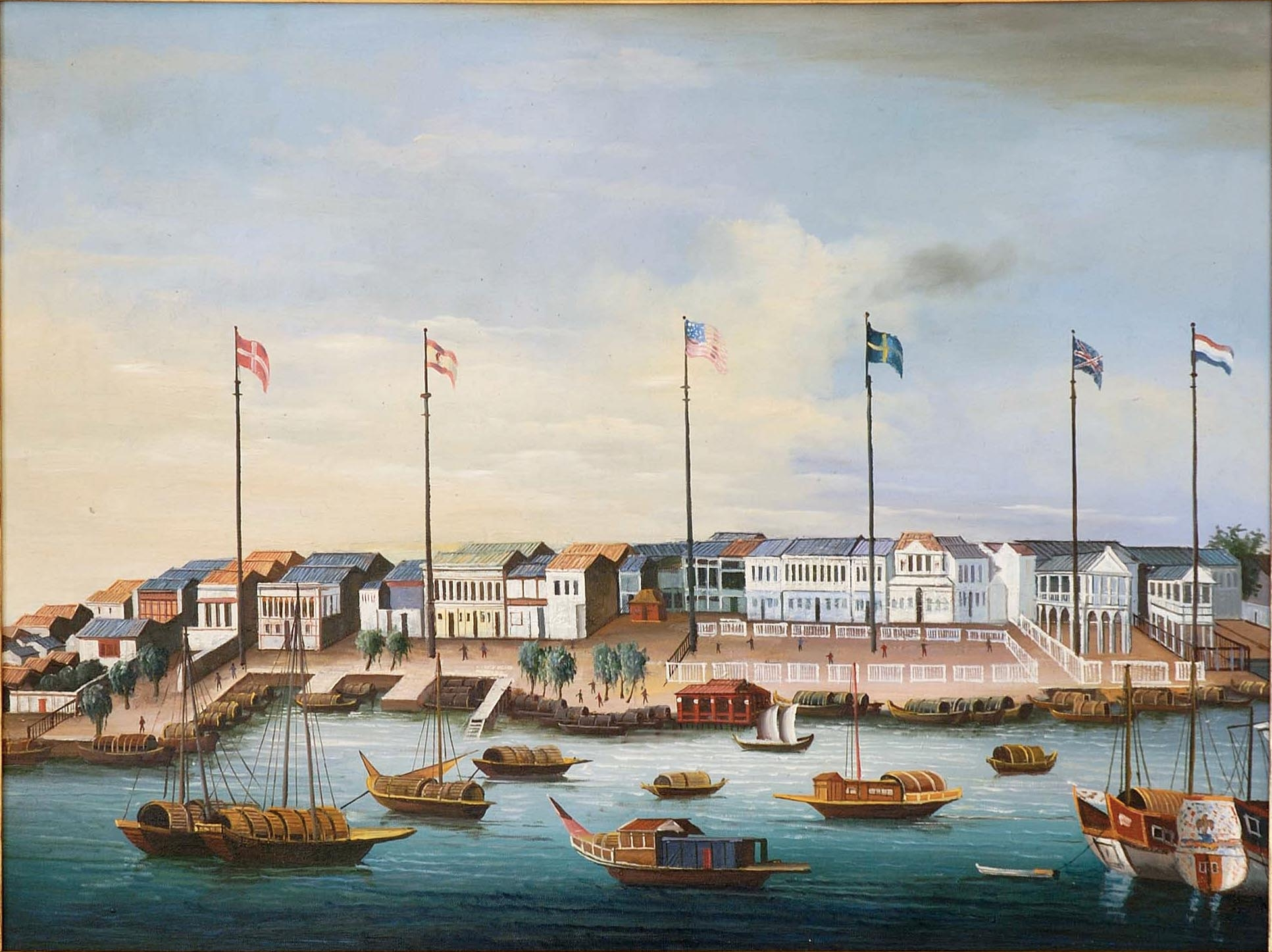
The Thirteen Factories, the area of Guangzhou to which China's Western trade was restricted from 1757–1842

Francis engaged in mercantile pursuits with his uncle Thomas Willing and cousin, Thomas Mayne Willing, under the name Willing & Francis. From 1805 to 1822, they focused on the Old China Trade and the transport of opium and tea. His uncle was also a partner in the firm of Willing & Morris with Robert Morris. In 1808, Francis purchased the ship, President Washington from John Brown and, his brother, John Francis of Providence, Rhode Island.

Willing & Francis employed many prominent men, including John Hare Powel and William Read, also a Philadelphia merchant, to represent his firm and Willing & Cuwen, and deliver correspondence regarding invoices of goods shipped, and other financial records. The firm worked with many prominent Chinese merchants, including Consequa (his trading name: Pan Changyao 潘長耀), a leading hong merchant.

The Bingham, owned by Willing & Francis, is likely the first recorded arrival of an American opium ship in China in 1805.

== Personal life ==
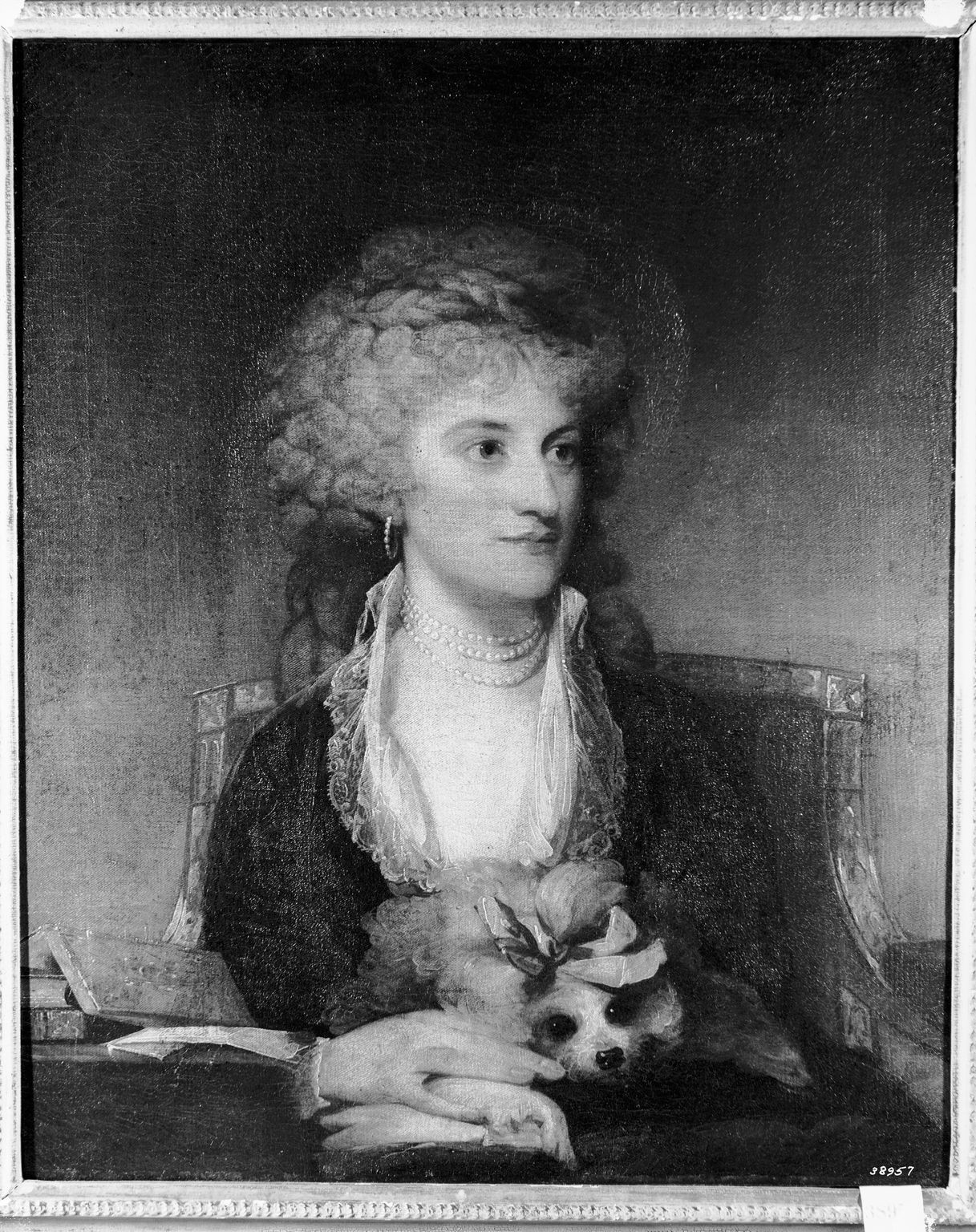
Dorothy Willing Francis, portrait by Gilbert Stuart

In the summer of 1794, Francis married his first cousin, Dorothy Willing (1772–1842). She was one of thirteen children of his maternal uncle, and namesake, Thomas Willing, and his wife, Anne (née McCall) Willing, who were among the wealthiest Americans. Dorothy's siblings included Anne Willing (wife of William Bingham), Thomas Mayne Willing, Elizabeth Willing (wife of William Jackson), Mary Willing, and Abigail Willing (wife of Richard Peters). Together, Thomas and Dorothy were the parents of:

- Elizabeth Francis (1796–1866), who married Henry Harrison. After his death, she married her cousin, John Brown Francis, as his second wife, in 1832.
- Thomas Francis, who married Miss Smith.
- Anne Francis (1802–1864), who married James Asheton Bayard Jr., a son of James A. Bayard and a U.S. Senator from Delaware, in 1823.
- Mary Willing Francis (1803–1827), who married her first cousin, Dr. Robert Powel Page, a grandson of the Governor of Virginia John Page, in 1819.

Francis died, intestate, on June 2, 1815, in Philadelphia, Pennsylvania. His widow Dorothy and cousin (and brother-in-law) Thomas Mayne Willing were the executors of his estate.

=== Descendants ===
Through his daughter Mary, he was a grandfather of Maria Byrd Page (1822–1854), who married Lt. Jonathan Mayhew Wainwright II (a son of Bishop Jonathan Mayhew Wainwright I), and Dorothy Willing Page (1823–1893), who married Nathaniel Burwell (a grandson of plantation owner Nathaniel Burwell).
