= Christ Church Burial Ground =

Historic site in Philadelphia

- U.S. National Register of Historic Places
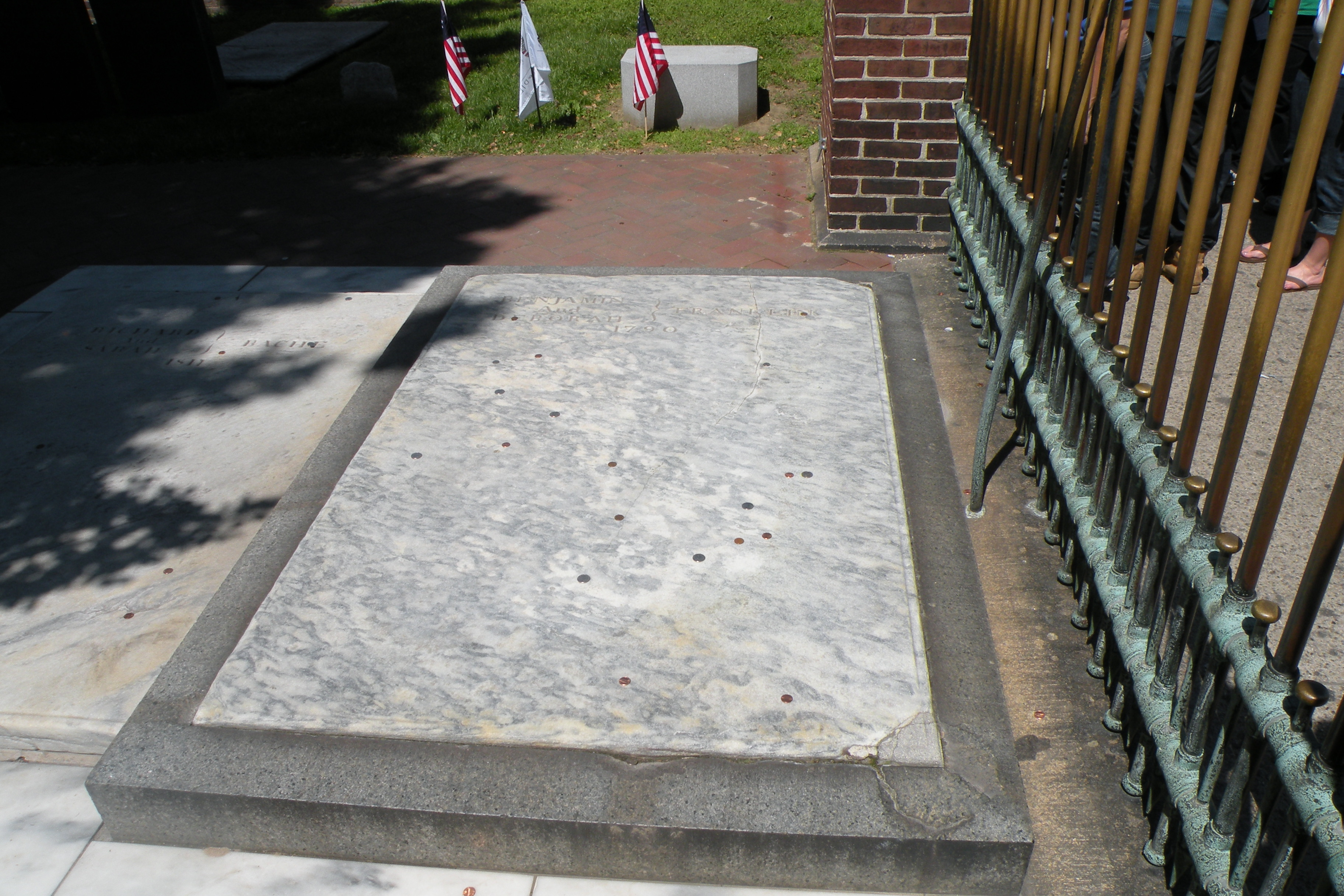
- Benjamin Franklin's gravesite in Christ Church Burial Ground in Philadelphia

- Location within Philadelphia Location within Pennsylvania Location within the United States
- Location: 5th and Arch streets, Philadelphia, Pennsylvania, U.S.
- Coordinates: 39°57′07″N 75°08′55″W
- NRHP reference No.: 71000062
- Added to NRHP: June 24, 1971

Christ Church Burial Ground in Philadelphia is an important early-American cemetery. It is the final resting place of Benjamin Franklin and his wife, Deborah. Four other signers of the Declaration of Independence are buried here, Benjamin Rush, Francis Hopkinson, Joseph Hewes, and George Ross. Two additional signers of the Declaration of Independence, James Wilson and Robert Morris, are buried at Christ Church just a few blocks away.

== History ==
The cemetery belongs to Christ Church, the Episcopal church, which was founded in 1695 and served as a place of worship for many of the most notable participants in the American Revolution, including George Washington. The burial ground is located at 5th and Arch streets, across from the Visitors Center and National Constitution Center in Center City Philadelphia. The Burial Ground was opened in 1719, and is still an active cemetery. The Burial Ground is open to the public for a small fee, weather permitting; about 100,000 tourists visit each year.

=== Benjamin Franklin gravesite ===
When the burial ground is closed, Benjamin Franklin's gravesite is visible from the sidewalk at the corner of 5th and Arch Streets through a set of iron rails. The bronze rails in the brick wall were added for public viewing in 1858 by parties working at the behest of the Franklin Institute, which assumed the responsibility of defending Franklin's historic ties to Philadelphia after prominent citizens from Boston criticized the city's maintenance of the grave and erected a Franklin statue there. Leaving pennies on Franklin's grave is a long-standing Philadelphia tradition.

== Burials ==
Other famous people buried at Christ Church Burial Ground include:

- John Andrews, (1746-1813), fourth Provost of the University of Pennsylvania
- Michael Woolston Ash (1789–1858), U.S. Congressman
- Samuel John Atlee (1739–1786), delegate to the Continental Congress
- Benjamin Franklin Bache (1769–1798), grandson of Benjamin Franklin, printer and publisher of the Aurora newspaper
- Sarah Franklin Bache (1743–1808), daughter of Benjamin Franklin
- William Bainbridge (1774–1833), Navy hero of War of 1812 and captain of the USS Constitution"
- Francis Biddle (1886–1968), former U.S. attorney general
- James Biddle (1783–1848), Commodore in United States Navy
- Thomas Bond (1713–1784), co-founder (with Benjamin Franklin) of Pennsylvania Hospital, the nation's first hospital
- Paul Busti (1749-1824), Agent General of the Holland Land Company
- Major General George Cadwalader (1806–1879), American Civil War general
- John Cadwalader (1805–1879), congressman and judge
- Matthew Clarkson (1733–1800), mayor of Philadelphia
- Joseph Clay (1769–1811), U.S. Congressman
- Tench Coxe (1755–1824), Continental Congress delegate
- William Henry Drayton (1742-1799), Continental Congress delegated and signer of the Articles of Confederation
- John Dunlap (1747–1812), printer of the Declaration of Independence
- Lewis Evans (c.1700–1756), cartographer and surveyor
- Tench Francis, Jr. (1730-1800)
- David Franks (1740–1793), aide-de-camp to General Benedict Arnold during the American Revolutionary War
- Samuel Hardy (1758–1785), delegate to the Continental Congress
- Michael Hillegas (1729–1804), first Treasurer of the United States
- Thomas Hopkinson (1709–1751), father of Francis Hopkinson, president of the Philosophical Society, and one of the founders of The Library Company of Philadelphia
- John Inskeep (1757–1834), mayor of Philadelphia
- Major William Jackson (1759–1828), Revolutionary War officer and secretary of the Constitutional Convention
- Thomas Lawrence, five-time mayor of Philadelphia
- Major General Charles Lee (1732-1782), controversial Revolutionary War officer and second-highest ranking general after George Washington from 1776 to 1778.
- Charles Mason (1728–1786), astronomer and surveyor who laid out the Mason–Dixon line in 1763
- George A. McCall (1802–1868), United States Army brigadier general and prisoner of war during the American Civil War
- William M. Meredith (1799–1873), United States Secretary of the Treasury
- Philip Syng Physick (1768–1837), known as the "father of modern surgery"
- John Hare Powel (1786-1856), Pennsylvania State Senator and agriculturalist
- Samuel Powel and his wife Elizabeth Willing Powel
- Henry C. Pratt (1761–1838) prominent Philadelphia businessman and builder of Lemon Hill
- Matthew Pratt (1734–1805) American colonial era portrait painter
- Col. Isaac Read (1739-1777) Virginia revolutionary and commander of the 1st Virginia Regiment, who died of disease during the Revolutionary War
- Benjamin Rush (1746–1813), signer of the Declaration of Independence and founder of Dickinson College, known as "the father of American psychiatry"
- Annis Boudinot Stockton (1736–1801), poet
- Philip Syng (1703–1789), silversmith who created the Syng inkstand and early co-founder with Benjamin Franklin of several organizations
- Henry Tazewell (1753–1799), U.S. Senator
- Commodore Thomas Truxtun, commander of the USS Constellation
- William Tuckey (1708–1781), composer
- John Goddard Watmough (1793-1861), U.S. Congressman
- Charles Willing, (1710–1754), three-term mayor of Philadelphia
- Anne Willing Francis (1733-1812) wife of Tench Francis and daughter of Charles Willing
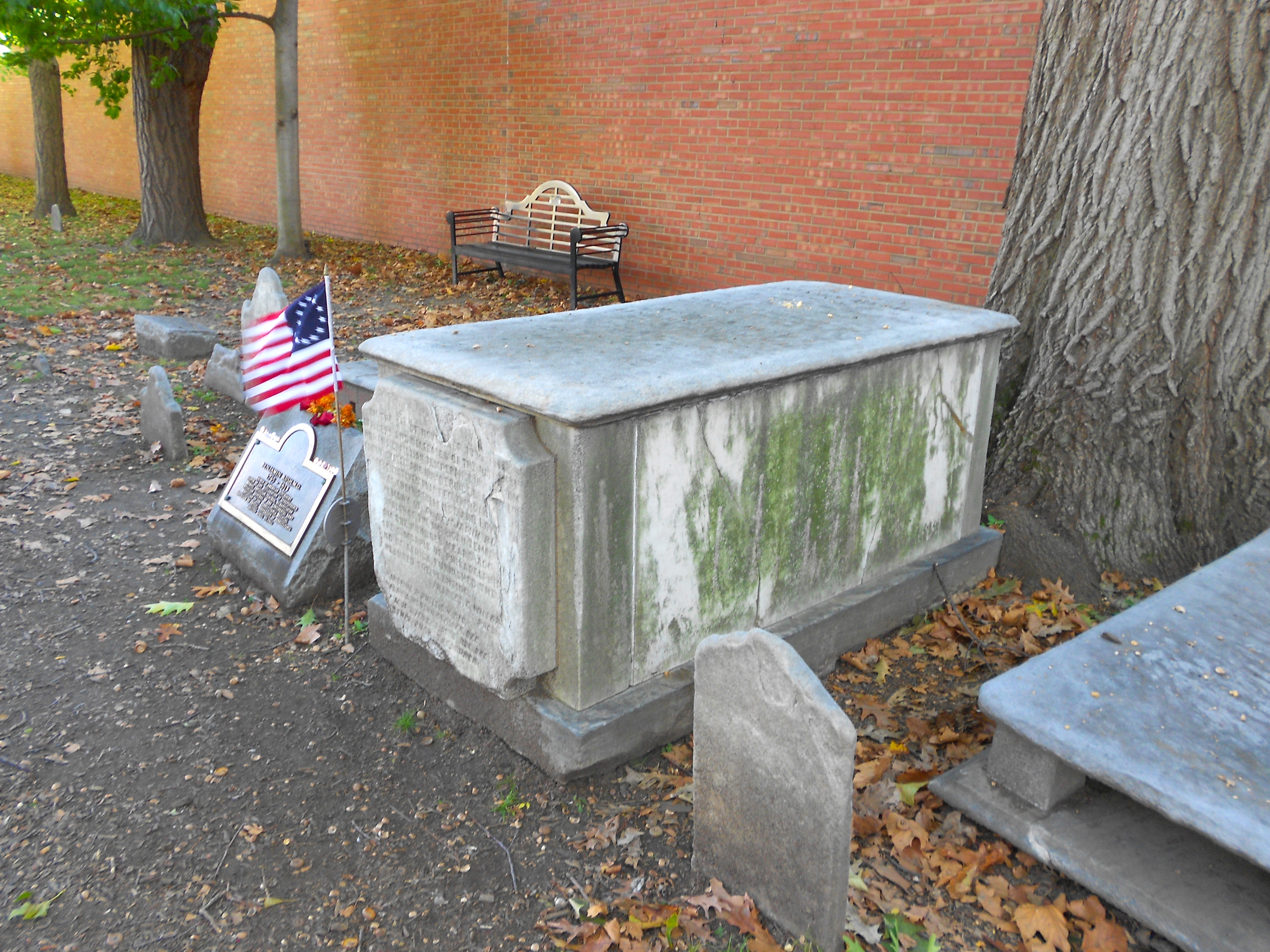
Benjamin Rush's grave

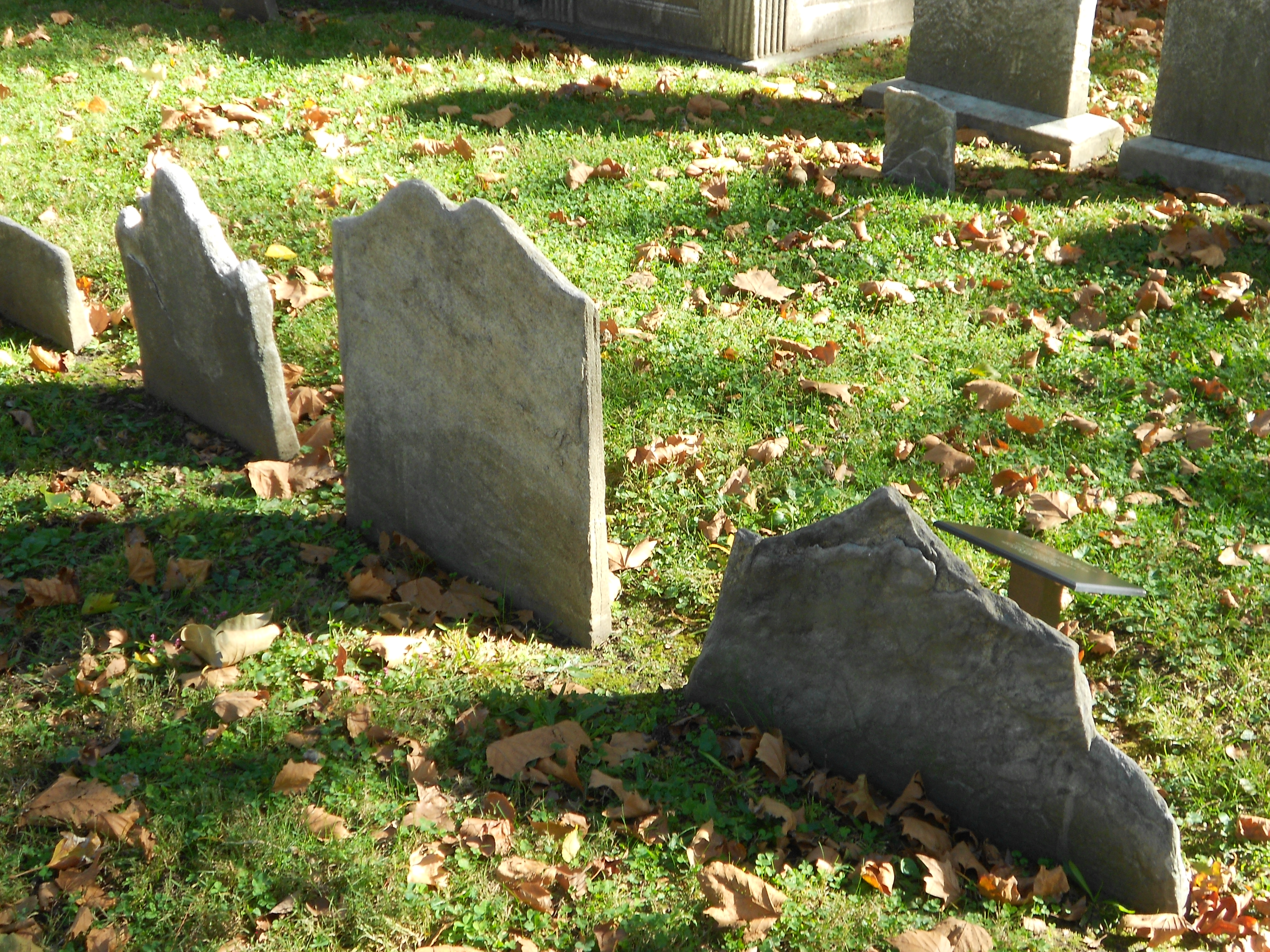
The grave of John Taylor (right), a long-time grave digger at the cemetery.

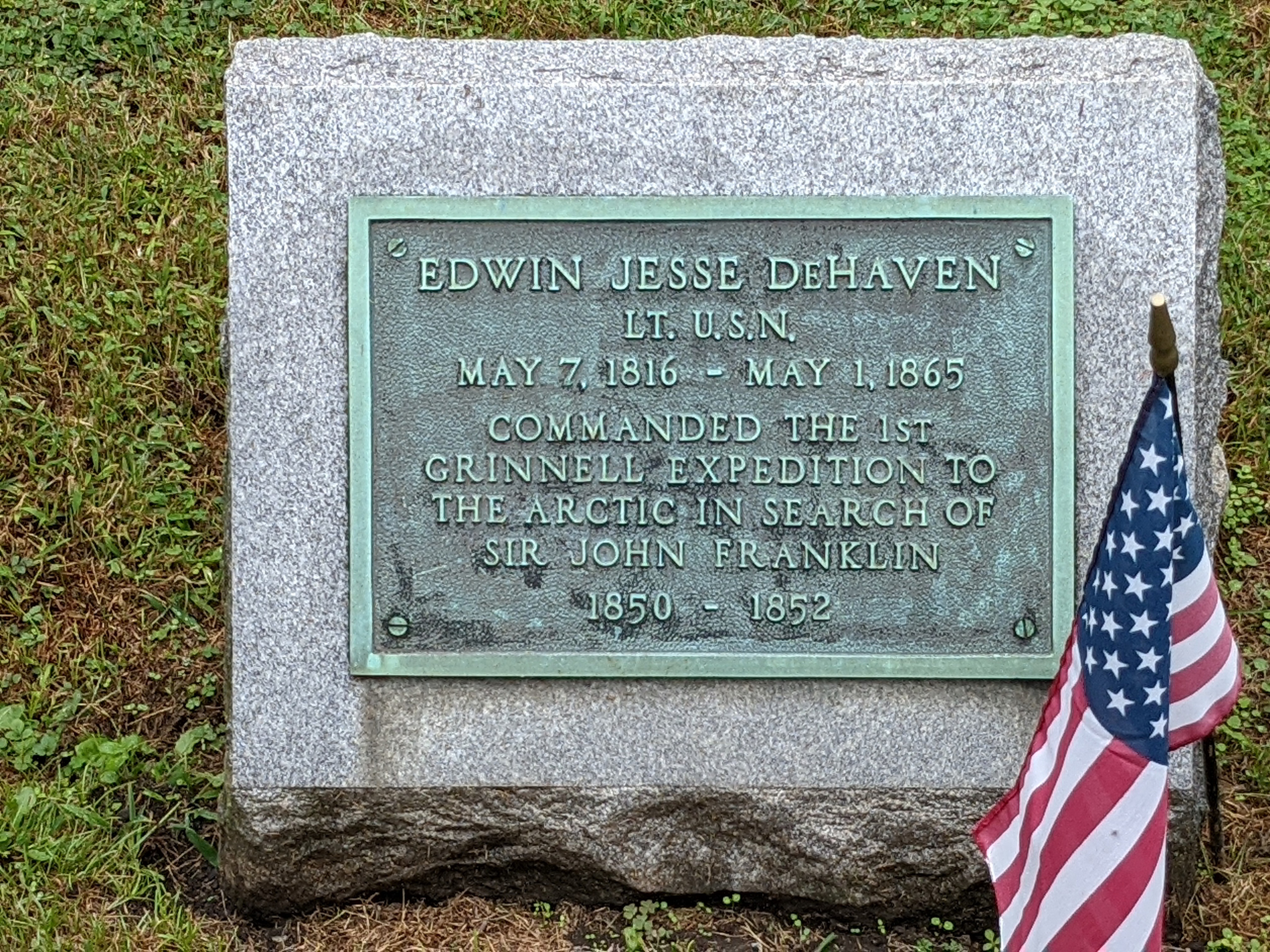
Edwin De Haven's headstone

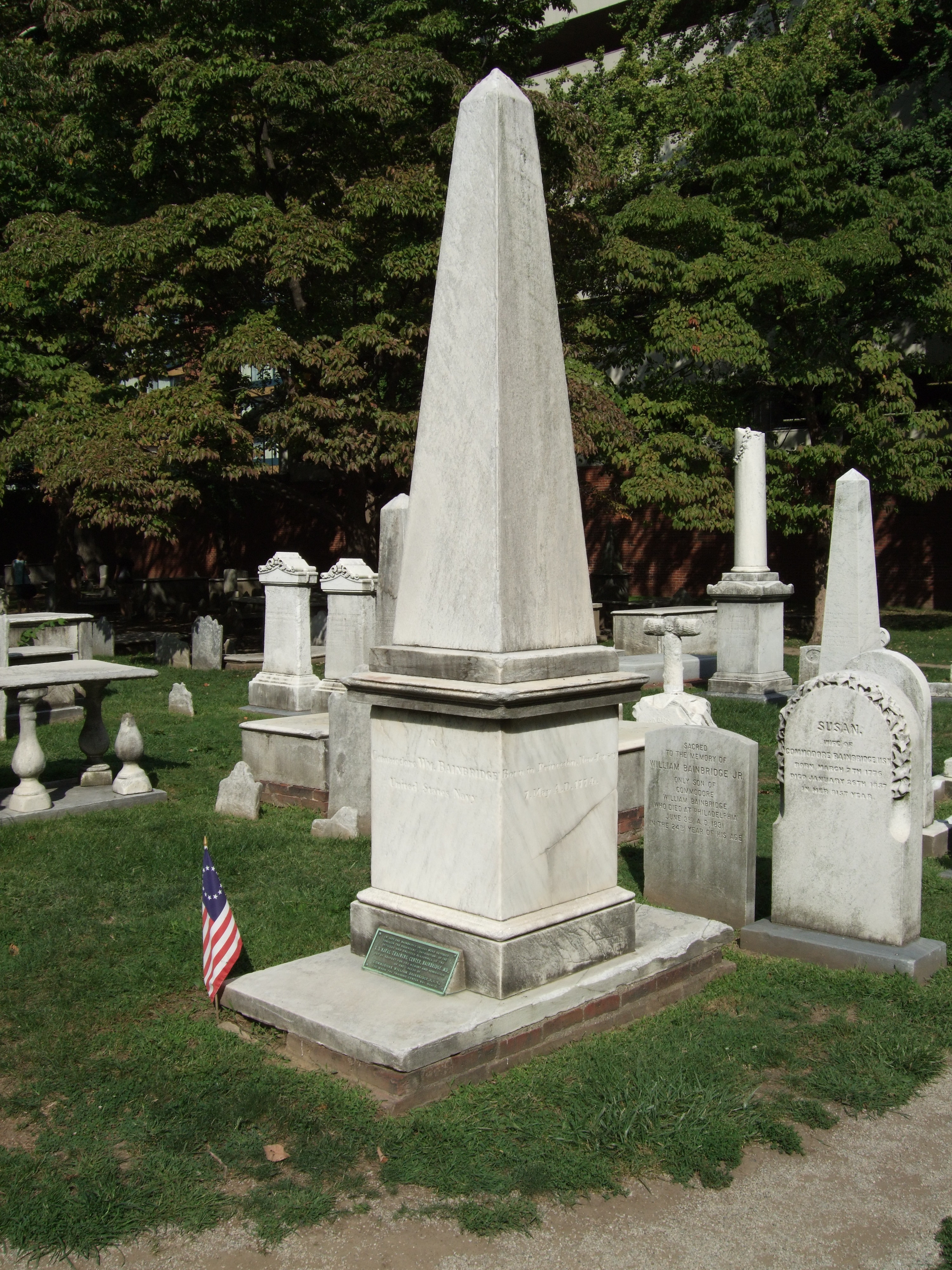
Commodore William Bainbridge's tombstone
