= Tench Francis =

Tench Francis may refer to:

- Tench Francis Sr. (died 1758), lawyer and jurist in colonial Philadelphia
- Tench Francis Jr. (1730–1800), his son, merchant and financier in Philadelphia
