= Israel Whelen =

American politician

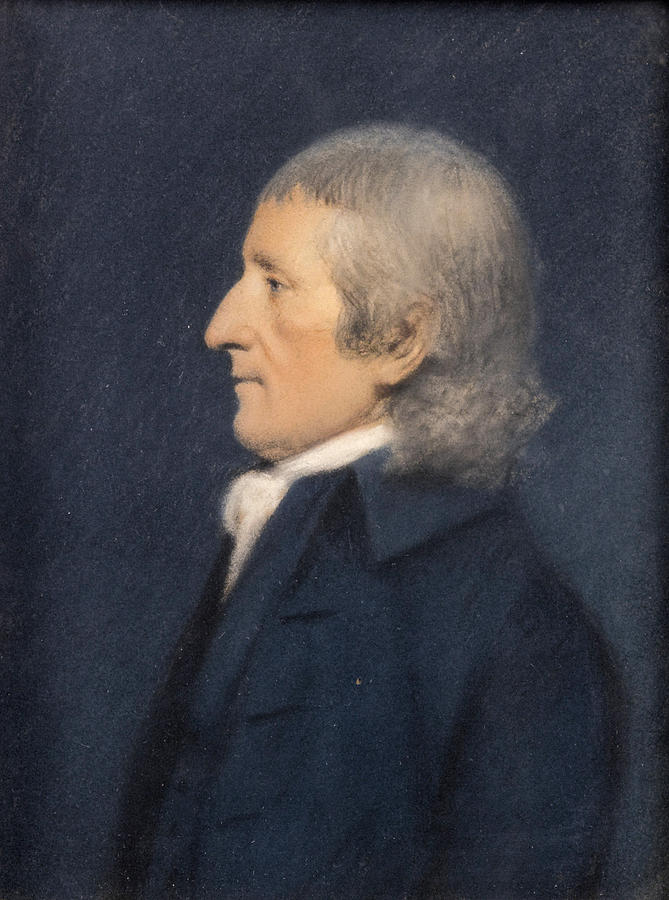
- Painting by James Sharples

2nd United States Purveyor of Public Supplies
- In office May 26, 1800 – Aug. 9, 1803
- Appointed by: John Adams
- Preceded by: Tench Francis Jr.
- Succeeded by: Tench Coxe

Member of the Pennsylvania Senate for the Philadelphia District
- In office 1797–1798

Member of the Pennsylvania Senate for the Philadelphia District
- In office 1795–1796

Personal details
- Born: December 13, 1752 Uwchlan Township, Pennsylvania
- Died: October 21, 1806 (aged 53) Philadelphia
- Spouse: Mary Downing
- Occupation: Merchant

Military service
- Branch/service: Pennsylvania Militia
- Years of service: 1776
- Rank: Commissary General

Israel Whelen (1752–1806) was a prosperous Pennsylvania merchant and government agent.

Whelen was born into a family of Quakers, yet he joined the Patriot movement and raised a company of Associators which he commanded in the field; subsequently being disowned by the Society of Friends, he insisted it was right to oppose "lawless tyranny." He served as a commissioner and financial agent for Congress in 1776, for signing Continental currency banknotes. Whelen later moved to Philadelphia where he started a grocery business. In 1794 he joined forces with Joseph Miller; their partnership soon expanded into shipping and at the end of the century also into an active trade in gunpowder with Revolutionary France, in spite of Whelen being a Federalist state senator.

As state senator Whelen sat on a committee to secure ratification of the Jay Treaty, and was also a member of the electoral college for Pennsylvania when 14 of 15 electors cast their ballots for Thomas Jefferson. He became United States commissioner of assessed taxes for the District of Pennsylvania, in charge of collecting all federal revenues in the state. Whelen was American agent of the Phoenix Insurance Company of London, one of the first members of the Philadelphia Stock Exchange when it was founded in 1790, a Director of the Bank of the United States when it was founded in 1791, and president of the Lancaster Turnpike Company. In 1800, Whelen was appointed purveyor of public supplies; an office he led until 1803. He was, as "Agent for the removal of the Public Departments" in charge of physically moving the government from Philadelphia to Washington, D.C.

As a merchant, Whelen amassed substantial assets and he built an impressive home near Downingtown. Yet, shortly before his death he suffered significant losses when the French government under Napoleon seized a number of his ships.

== Legacy ==
The Defense Logistics Agency Troop Support Headquarters in Philadelphia is dedicated in honor of Israel Whelen.
