= William Plumsted =

Mayor of Philadelphia

William Plumsted (November 7, 1708 – August 10, 1765) was the mayor of Philadelphia in 1750, 1754, and 1755.

== Early life ==
Plumsted was born on November 7, 1708, in Philadelphia, Pennsylvania. The son of Clement Plumsted, who was also a mayor of Philadelphia, he served also as councilman, register of wills, and justice.

== Career ==
Plumsted served as the mayor of Philadelphia in 1750, 1754, and 1755.

Plumsted was a Freemason. He was a member of St. John's Lodge and served as Grand Master of Pennsylvania in 1737. He was also a founder of the Academy and College of Philadelphia (now the University of Pennsylvania), of which he served as a trustee until his death.

== Personal life ==
Plumsted was married to Rebecca Kearney, daughter of Philip Kearny of Philadelphia, and whose sister Mary was the wife of Chief Justice John Kinsey. Before her death in 1741, they were the parents of:

- Elisabeth Plumsted (1735–1799), who married Andrew Elliot, a younger son of Sir Gilbert Elliot, 2nd Baronet of Minto.
- Mary Plumsted (b. 1736), who died unmarried.
- Rebecca Plumsted (1737–1799), who married Charles Gore in c. 1760.
- Clement Plumsted (1738–1738), who died young.
- Clement Plumsted (1739–1739), who died young.
- Thomas Plumsted (b. 1740), who married Mary Coats in 1762.

After Rebecca's death, he married Mary McCall by the Rev. Robert Jenney at Christ Church, Philadelphia on the September 27, 1753. Mary was the daughter of George McCall and the sister of Samuel McCall Jr., his fellow Trustee of what became the University of Pennsylvania. Together, they were the parents of:

- William Plumsted (1754–1756), who died young.
- George Plumsted (1755–1756), who died young.
- Clement Plumsted (1758–1800), who died unmarried.
- Ann Plumsted (1760–c. 1772), who died unmarried.
- Catherine Plumsted (1760–1802), who died unmarried.
- George Plumsted (1765–1805), who married Ann Helena Amelia Ross in 1795.

Plumsted died on August 10, 1765.

=== Descendants ===
Through his daughter Elisabeth, he was a grandfather of Agnes Murray Elliot (1763–1860), who married Sir David Carnegie, 4th Baronet, and Elizabeth Elliot (c. 1764–1847), who married William Cathcart, 1st Earl Cathcart.

Preceded by Thomas Lawrence	Mayor of Philadelphia; 1750–1751	Succeeded by Robert Strettell
Preceded by Charles Willing	Mayor of Philadelphia; 1754–1756	Succeeded by Attwood Shute
