= Charles Read (Philadelphia) =

Merchant and mayor of Philadelphia

Charles Read (b. circa 1686 - January 20, 1736) was a merchant and the 20th mayor of Philadelphia, serving from October 4, 1726 to October 3, 1727. He also owned the house that became the London Coffee House, which he bought for £150.

== Life ==
Born circa 1686, Charles Read was related to Deborah Read, who married Benjamin Franklin. In 1717 he qualified as a Common Councilman, and a year later was commissioned Justice of the Peace for Philadelphia county. He was promoted to Alderman on October 22, 1722. In 1723, he was charged with leading the Free Society of Traders. He was also sheriff, excise collector and judge of admiralty, before finally becoming mayor in 1726. The third Charles Read, his son, was born in the London Coffee House (finished in 1702) in 1715.

One of his final positions was Clerk of the Orphan's Court of Philadelphia county, where he was succeeded by his deputy, Thomas Hopkinson, upon his death in 1736.

Preceded by William Hudson	Mayor of Philadelphia; 1725–1726	Succeeded by Thomas Lawrence (mayor)
