= William Attwood (mayor) =

Mayor of Philadelphia

29th Mayor of Philadelphia
- In office October 7, 1746 – October 4, 1748
- Preceded by: James Hamilton
- Succeeded by: Charles Willing

Personal details
- Died: June 25, 1754 Philadelphia, Province of Pennsylvania, British Empire
- Spouse(s): Ann Stocker (died 1747); Mary Stocker Penry
- Children: 1

William Attwood Esq. (died June 25, 1754) was the 29th Mayor of Philadelphia, serving during the colonial period.

== Career ==
Attwood serveda as a common councilman for Philadelphia in 1729 onwards, and was elevated to an alderman in 1743. He became Mayor of Philadelphia on October 7, 1746. At the time, Anthony Morris was the first pick of the council, but he was not present at the meeting and could not be found at his home. Attwood was picked in his place due to the circumstances. He was re-elected the following year, serving until October 4, 1748. During his term as mayor, he helped encourage willing acceptance of the position by having common council set the salary of mayor to £100 (£28,780.75 in 2026).

== Personal life ==
Attwood was a Quaker and a merchant in Philadelphia. He was invested in the iron furnace industry of the Schuylkill Valley. He is recorded as having imported one African-American slave from England in 1744.

He was married to a cousin of Mary Penry, Ann Stocker, who immigrated from Wales to America. She died in 1747 of Yellow fever. He subsequently married Mary's mother, Mary Stocker. They had a daughter, Elizabeth, on January 20, 1751, two months prior to marriage, although she died on September 26, 1758. He was in the process of being disowned by the Quaker church for his "irregular & scandalous conduct in diverse respects." He died on June 25, 1754, and his will was executed by relative Shute Attwood.
