= Attwood Shute =

American politician

Attwood Shute was mayor of Philadelphia, serving from October 5, 1756 to October 5, 1758. He was an Episcopalian.

Preceded by William Plumsted	Mayor of Philadelphia; 1756-58	Succeeded by Thomas Lawrence II
