= Purveyor of Public Supplies =

Agency overview
- Formed: 1795
- Dissolved: 1812
- Superseding agencies: Commissary General of Purchase, War Department; Secretary of the Navy
- Type: Government procurement agency
- Jurisdiction: United States Government
- Headquarters: Philadelphia, Pennsylvania
- Agency executives: Tench Francis Jr., 1795-1800; Israel Whelen, 1800-1803; Tench Coxe, 1803-1812
- Parent department: United States Department of the Treasury 1795-1798; United States Department of War 1798-1812

The Purveyor of Public Supplies was the government official in charge of most government procurement in the early Republic including the procurement of all military and naval supplies except food. The office was established in 1795 and superseded by the Commissary General of Purchase in the War Department and the Secretary of the Navy respectively in 1812.

== History ==
In the small peace-time army that existed after the Revolutionary War, logistic responsibilities were vested in civilian office holders. The Quartermaster General became a civil official without military rank, whose sole function was transportation. In 1792, Congress made the Department of the Treasury in charge of acquisition of uniforms, military rations, weapons and ammunition. The War Department maintained its control over transportation of military supplies. The direct reason was St. Clair's defeat in 1791, and the criticism of Henry Knox and the War Department. Although Alexander Hamilton had since 1790 argued for centralizing procurement of military supplies under the Department of the Treasury.

Central procurement overloaded the Treasury Department, and in 1795, two subordinate supply agencies were created; the Purveyor of Public Supplies in the Treasury and the Superintendent of Military Stores in the War Department. The former purchased military and naval supplies, while the former collected, stored and distributed them. In 1798, the Office of the Purveyor of Public Supplies was transferred to the War Department. Provisions still fell under the Treasury Department. Both the War Secretary and the Secretary of the Navy would direct the Purveyor regarding purchase of military and naval supplies respectively. The audit of naval accounts was at the same time transferred from the Purveyor to the Accountant of the Navy, a civil official in the Navy Department.

The procurement of all military supplies except military rations fell to the Purveyor of Public Supplies who executed the orders of the Secretary of War and made contracts for clothing, shoes, camp utensils, military stores, equipage, medicines and hospital stores. From 1795 to 1801, the Purveyor was in charge of purchasing merchandise for the government fur trade factories and for disposing of the goods received from them. In 1801, these duties were taken over by the Acting Superintendent of Military Stores and Acting Agent for the Indian Factories.

With the reestablishment of the Army Quartermaster Department in 1812, the office of the Purveyor of Public Supplies was abolished and procurement of military supplies fell to the Commissary General of Purchase, which was a civil official in the War Department. The Secretary of the Navy became responsible for procurement of naval supplies until the creation of the Board of Navy Commissioners in 1815.

== Legacy ==
The United States Navy Supply Corps dates its origin to February 23, 1795, the date of the passing of the law creating the Office of Purveyor of Public Supplies.
