= Thomas Lawrence (mayor) =

American mayor

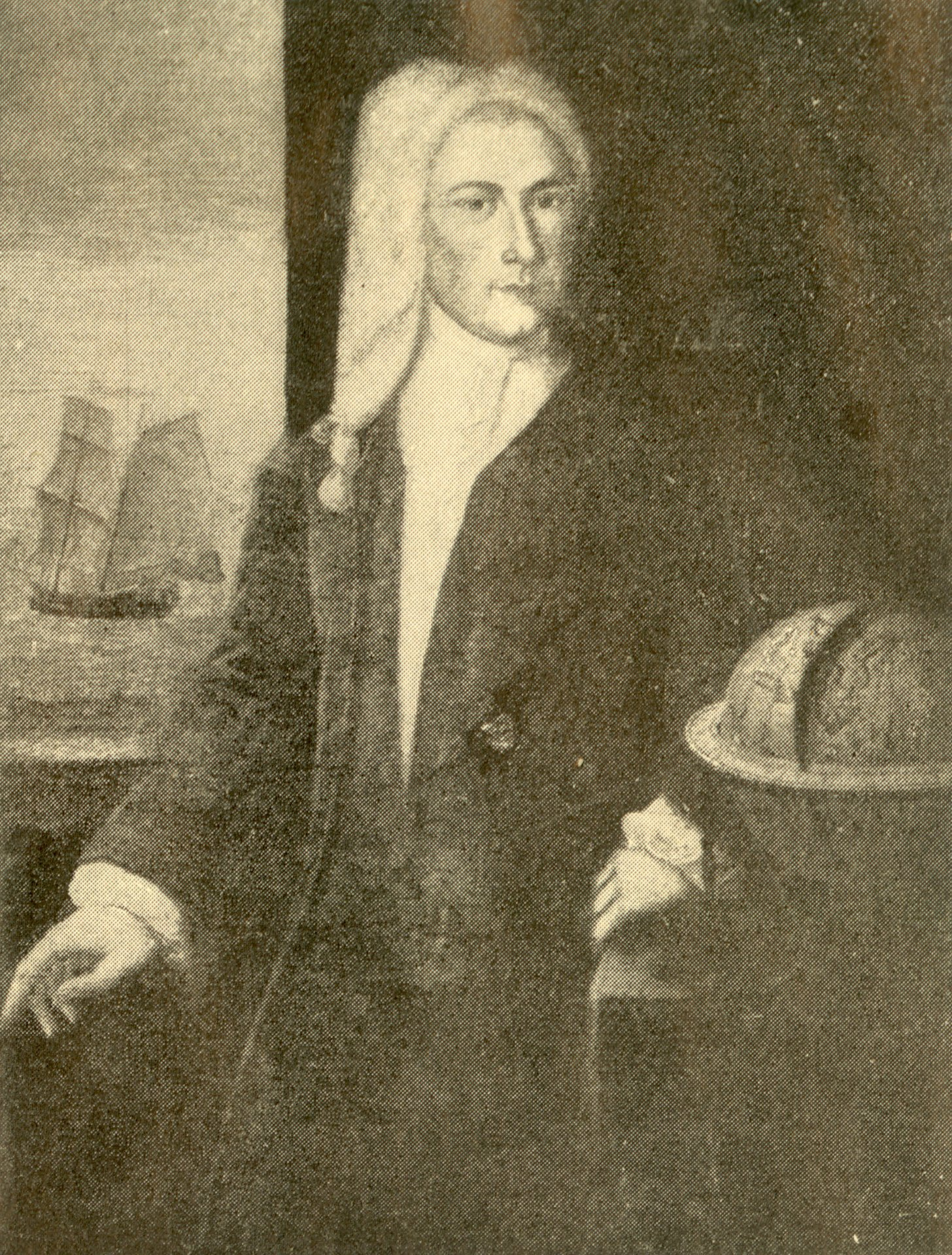

19th Mayor of Philadelphia
- In office October 2, 1753 – April 25, 1754
- Preceded by: Charles Willing
- Succeeded by: William Plumsted
- In office October 3, 1749 – October 2, 1750
- Preceded by: Charles Willing
- Succeeded by: William Plumsted
- In office October 1, 1734 – October 7, 1735
- Preceded by: Thomas Griffitts
- Succeeded by: William Allen
- In office October 3, 1727 – October 7, 1729
- Preceded by: Charles Read
- Succeeded by: Thomas Griffitts

Personal details
- Born: September 4, 1689 New York City, New York
- Died: April 21, 1754 (aged 64) Philadelphia, Pennsylvania
- Occupation: Merchant; Politician

Thomas Lawrence (1689–1754) was a merchant who was elected to six one-year terms as mayor of Philadelphia between 1727 and his death in 1754. He was also a founder and trustee of The Academy and College of Philadelphia.

== Formative years ==
Born in New York City, Lawrence moved to Philadelphia in 1720, where, for the rest of his life, he was engaged in the mercantile business. In 1730, after being associated with James Logan, Lawrence formed a partnership with Edward Shippen; Shippen & Lawrence became one of Philadelphia's leading firms.

== Political career ==
Apart from his life in private business, Lawrence held several positions of trust in the city, including serving as mayor for six one-year terms, as city councilman and alderman, and as judge of the county court. During 1730 he worked with Dr. John Kearsley and Andrew Hamilton on a committee for the preparation and planning to build the Philadelphia state house, the later Independence Hall. At the provincial level, Lawrence began his service on the Provincial Council in 1728.

== Death and interment ==
Lawrence died in Philadelphia in 1754, while still an office holder, and was buried at Philadelphia's Christ Church Burial Ground.

Following his death, a notice was placed in Benjamin Franklin's Pennsylvania Gazette which lauded Lawrence's record of public service and his humanity in all aspects of his life.

== Legacy ==
Lawrence was a founder and trustee of The Academy and College of Philadelphia.

He was the father of Thomas Lawrence II, as well of John Lawrence, who both also served as Mayor of Philadelphia.

Preceded by Charles Read	Mayor of Philadelphia; 1727–1729 (2 terms)	Succeeded by Thomas Griffitts
Preceded by Thomas Griffitts	Mayor of Philadelphia; 1734–1735	Succeeded by William Allen
Preceded by Charles Willing	Mayor of Philadelphia; 1749–1750	Succeeded by William Plumsted
Preceded by Benjamin Shoemaker	Mayor of Philadelphia; 1753–1754 (died in office)	Succeeded by Charles Willing
