= William Hudson (mayor) =

Colonial mayor of Philadelphia

17th Mayor of Philadelphia
- In office October 5, 1725 – October 4, 1726
- Preceded by: Isaac Norris
- Succeeded by: Charles Read

Personal details
- Born: April 3, 1664 York, England
- Died: October 16, 1742 (aged 78)
- Spouse(s): Mary Richardson (1688–death); Hannah Ogden Barber (1710–death)
- Children: 14

William Hudson Jr (April 3, 1664 – October 16, 1742) was the 17th Mayor of Philadelphia, serving during the period of the Province of Pennsylvania.

== Career ==
Hudson was a member of the Pennsylvania colonial assembly, and was a member of the common council at the time of Philadelphia's incorporating charter in 1701. He was a member of the Provincial Assembly in 1706 and became an alderman in 1715. He later served as Mayor of Philadelphia from October 5, 1725 to October 4, 1726. He also served as a city judge.

Outside of his political career, he was described as one of the "wealthiest of the early merchants in Philadelphia."

== Personal life ==
Hudson was born on April 3, 1664, in York to William Hudson Sr. and Mary Head. He was married to Mary Richardson, who was born in London on April 19, 1673. They were married on December 28, 1688, and stayed so until Mary died on December 16, 1709, during the birth of her 14th child. In 1710, he remarried to Hannah Ogden Barber, a widow. Hudson died on October 16, 1742.

His children were: Samuel, Mary Richardson, Elizabeth Sarah, William III, John, Susannah, Eleanor, John, Hannah, Rebecca, Timothy, Rachael, and Timothy. Of those, at least Mary, Susannah, Hannah, William, and Rachael survived into adulthood.

A clock owned by Hudson was donated to the Philadelphia Public Library in 1796. It was purchased by Hudson's father at auction in London, and it was stated to have, at one point, belonged to Oliver Cromwell. He was related to English navigator Henry Hudson.
