= John Lawrence (mayor of Philadelphia) =

Mayor of Philadelphia

39th Mayor of Philadelphia
- In office October 1, 1765 – October 6, 1767
- Preceded by: Thomas Lawrence II
- Succeeded by: Isaac Jones

Personal details
- Born: May 20, 1724 Philadelphia, Province of Pennsylvania, British Empire
- Died: January 1799 (aged 74-75) Longbridge Farm, South Brunswick, New Jersey, United States
- Relations: Thomas Lawrence II (brother); Thomas Lawrence (father)
- Children: 1

John Lawrence, Esq. (May 20, 1724 – January 1799) was the 39th Mayor of Philadelphia and the third in his family to hold that title.

== Early life and family ==
Lawrence was born on May 20, 1724. He was the second son of Thomas Lawrence I, who was Mayor of Philadelphia from 1727 to 1729, 1734, 1749, and 1753. His elder brother, Thomas Lawrence II, also served as mayor in both 1758 and 1764. Although he was born and worked in Philadelphia, he travelled to England during his formative years for his education.

He married Elizabeth Francis (1733–1800), the daughter of Tench Francis Sr. Late in their lives, they lived on 6th and Chestnut. Their only child, Betsey Lawrence, married to James Allen, Esq. (later to Judge John Lawrence of New York City).

From 1756 to 1765, he owned the Rockland tract of land in Fairmount Park as part of his estate; following his death, it would be sold before becoming the Rockland Mansion. His prior estate there was visited by General Washington and Martha Washington on May 30, 1760.

== Career ==
Lawrence was appointed Clerk of Quarter Sessions in 1747, and became an associate justice of the Supreme Court on September 14. 1767, serving until the American Revolution.

He was a common councilman for Philadelphia starting in 1762, became an alderman two years later, and was elected mayor on October 1, 1765, and was unanimously re-elected for another term in 1766, serving until October 6, 1767. Due to his family's influence on the position in the 18th century, he was considered a "very notable mayor" of his time.

Lawrence travelled back to England after the Revolutionary War, although returned back to Pennsylvania in his final years, dying in January 1799 at Longbridge Farm in South Brunswick, New Jersey.
