= Thomas Lawrence II =

Mayor of Philadelphia

Thomas Lawrence

34th Mayor of Philadelphia
- In office October 15, 1758 – October 2, 1759
- Preceded by: Attwood Shute
- Succeeded by: John Stamper

Personal details
- Born: April 16, 1720 Philadelphia, Province of Pennsylvania, British Empire
- Died: January 1775 (aged 54)
- Spouse: Mary Morris
- Relations: John Lawrence (brother); Thomas Lawrence (father)
- Children: 12

Thomas Lawrence II, Esq. (1720–1775) was the 34th Mayor of Philadelphia, serving in its 47th and 53rd mayorships.

== Early life and family ==
Lawrence was born on April 16, 1720. He was the eldest son of Thomas Lawrence I, who also served as Mayor of Philadelphia, and his wife Rachel Longfield. His younger brother, John Lawrence, also served in the position after him.

He married Mary Morris (1723–1804), daughter of Judge Lewis Morris. Collectively, they had 12 children. Those surviving childhood include Katherine (m. John Shee), Thomas III (m. Rebecca Bond, daughter of Thomas Bond), Rachel (m. John Marston), John (m. Elizabeth St. Clair, daughter of Arthur St. Clair), William (m. John Tongelou Ricketts), and Mary (m. Warren DeLancey).

== Career ==
Lawrence became a common councilman in 1748 and an alderman in 1755. He served as the Mayor of Philadelphia from 1758 to 1759, and again from 1764 to 1765.

He was a merchant, and worked with Peter Bard, another prominent Philadelphia businessman of the time. He died in January 1775.
