= Francis Hopkinson House =

Historic house in New Jersey, United States

- U.S. National Register of Historic Places
- U.S. National Historic Landmark
- New Jersey Register of Historic Places
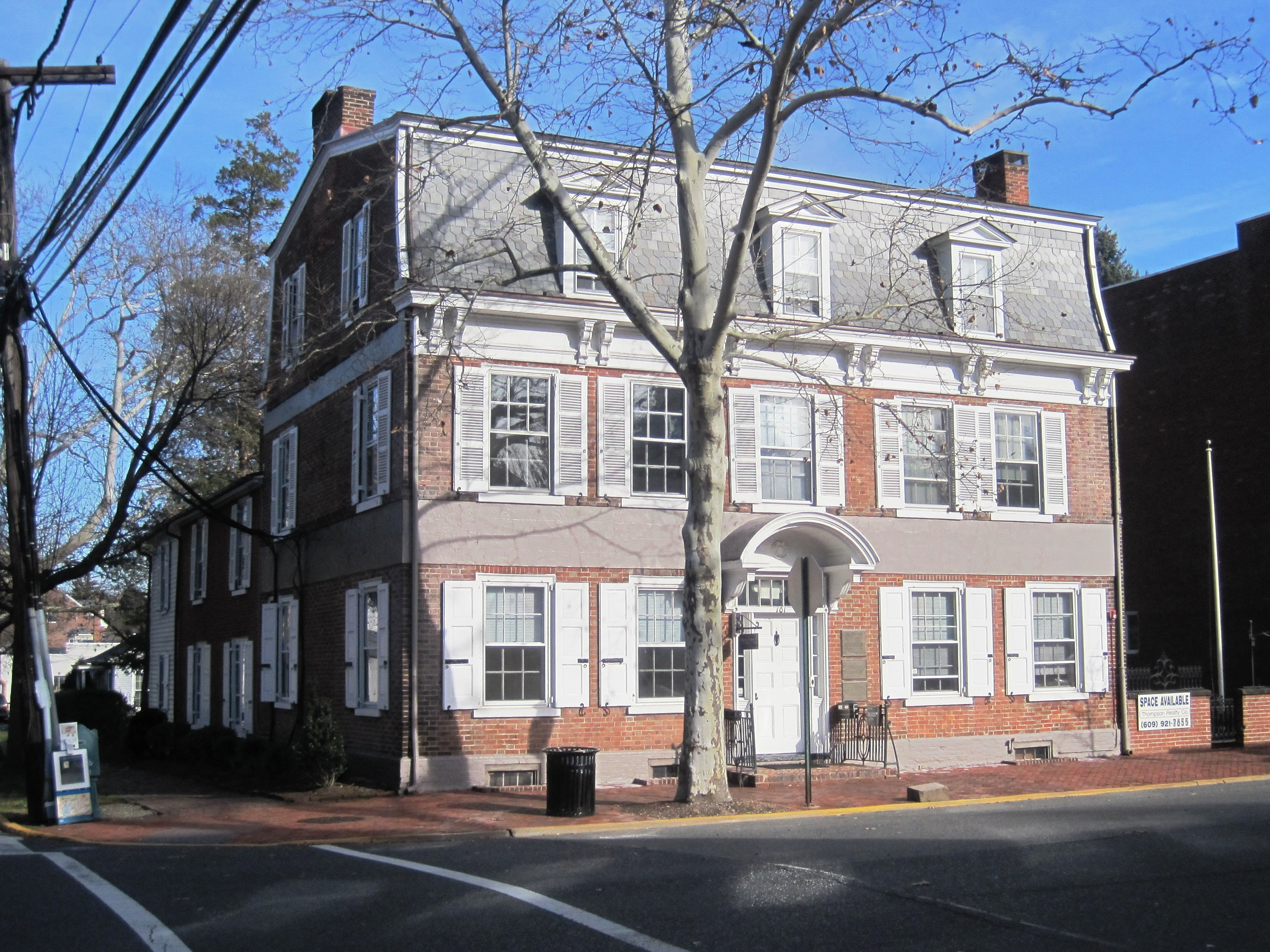
- Francis Hopkinson House in 2017

- Location within Burlington County, New Jersey Location within New Jersey Location within the United States
- Location: 101 Farnsworth Avenue (CR 545), Bordentown, New Jersey
- Coordinates: 40°8′54″N 74°42′50″W
- Built: 1750
- Architect: John Imlay
- NRHP reference No.: 71000496
- NJRHP No.: 75

Significant dates
- Added to NRHP: July 17, 1971
- Designated NHL: July 17, 1971
- Designated NJRHP: July 17, 1971

The Francis Hopkinson House is an historic house at 101 Farnsworth Avenue in the city of Bordentown in Burlington County, New Jersey, United States. Built in 1750, it was the home of Founding Father Francis Hopkinson (1737-1791), the designer of the United States Flag and a signer of the United States Declaration of Independence. He lived in this home with his wife Ann Borden (1747-1827) from 1774 until Hopkinson's death in 1791. Ann Borden was the granddaughter of Joseph Borden, the founder of Bordentown, New Jersey. The house was designated a National Historic Landmark in 1971.

== Description and history ==
The Francis Hopkinson House stands on the northern edge of Bordentown's downtown area, at the southeast corner of Farnsworth and West Park Streets. It is a 2 1/2-story brick building, covered with a gambrel roof. Its main facade is five bays wide, with a center entrance sheltered by a rounded hood supported by decorative Italianate brackets. Sash windows are arranged symmetrically around the entrance, and the steep slope of the gambrel roof is pierced by three dormers with rounded tops echoing to entrance hood in style. The interior of the house has been stylistically altered, although its basic floor plan is little altered.

The house was built in 1750 by Joseph Imlay, a local merchant. Francis Hopkinson, a lawyer native to Philadelphia, moved here in 1774. Hopkinson was one of the signers of the Declaration of Independence as a delegate from New Jersey. He was also the first American-born composer of secular music. During the American Revolution, Hopkinson designed Continental currency, departmental seals, and most of the elements in the Great Seal of the United States. He later served as a federal judge in Pennsylvania.

The house was to be burned by the British during a military action in 1778, but was spared by a Hessian officer's appreciation of Hopkinson's library. The house remained in the Hopkinson family until 1915. It has since seen mixed residential and professional use.

== See also ==
- List of National Historic Landmarks in New Jersey
- National Register of Historic Places listings in Burlington County, New Jersey
