= Francis Hopkinson =

American Founding Father and jurist (1737–1791)

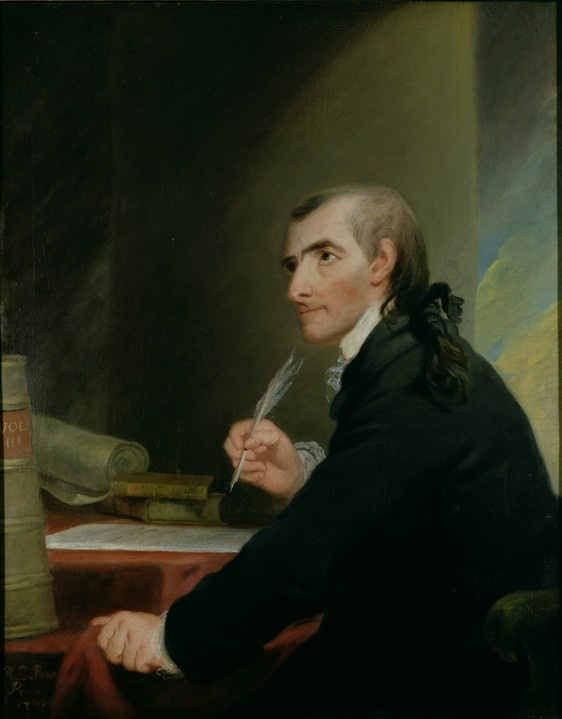
- Portrait by Robert Edge Pine, c. 1785

Judge of the United States District Court for the District of Pennsylvania
- In office September 26, 1789 – May 9, 1791
- Appointed by: George Washington
- Preceded by: Seat established by 1 Stat. 73
- Succeeded by: William Lewis

Personal details
- Born: October 2, 1737 Philadelphia, Province of Pennsylvania, British America
- Died: May 9, 1791 (aged 53) Philadelphia, Pennsylvania, U.S.
- Cause of death: sudden seizure
- Resting place: Christ Church Burial Ground; Philadelphia, Pennsylvania, U.S.
- Children: Joseph Hopkinson
- Parent: Thomas Hopkinson (father)
- Relatives: James Johnson
- Education: University of Pennsylvania (AB, AM)
- Awards: Magellanic Premium (1790)

Francis Hopkinson (October 2, (Note: Hopkinson was born on September 21, 1737, according to the then-used Julian calendar (old style). In 1752, however, Great Britain and all its colonies adopted the Gregorian calendar (new style) which moved Hopkinson's birthday 11 days forward to October 2, 1737. See George E. Hastings, The Life and Works of Francis Hopkinson. (Chicago: University of Chicago Press, 1926), p. 43.) 1737 – May 9, 1791) was an American Founding Father, lawyer, jurist, author, and composer. He designed Continental paper money and two early versions of flags, one for the United States and one for the United States Navy. He was a signer of the Declaration of Independence in July 1776 as a delegate from New Jersey.

Hopkinson served in various roles in the early United States government including as a member of the Second Continental Congress and as a member of the Navy Board. He became the first federal judge of the Eastern District Court of Pennsylvania on September 30, 1789.

== Education and early career ==
Born on October 2, 1737 (Gregorian), September 21, 1737 (Julian) in Philadelphia, Province of Pennsylvania. Hopkinson received an Artium Baccalaureus degree in 1757 from the College of Philadelphia (now the University of Pennsylvania) and an Artium Magister degree in 1760 from the same institution. He was the first American-born composer to write a surviving secular song. He was secretary of a commission of the Provincial Council of Pennsylvania which made a treaty between the province and certain Indian tribes in 1761. He entered private practice in Philadelphia from 1761 to 1766. He was collector of customs in Salem, Province of New Jersey, in 1763.

Hopkinson spent from May 1766 to August 1767 in England in hopes of becoming commissioner of customs for North America. Although unsuccessful, he spent time with the future Prime Minister Lord North, Hopkinson's cousin James Johnson, and the painter Benjamin West. Upon his return to Philadelphia in 1768, he sold varieties of fabric and port wine.

In 1768, Hopkinson was elected to the revived American Philosophical Society and served as its curator from 1776 to 1782. He was collector of customs for New Castle, Delaware Colony from 1772 to 1773. He resumed private practice in Bordentown, New Jersey from 1773 to 1774. He was a member of the New Jersey Provincial Council from 1774 to 1776. He was a member of the Executive Council of New Jersey in 1775. He was admitted to practice before the bar of the Supreme Court of New Jersey on May 8, 1775, and was elected an associate justice of that court in 1776 but declined the office.

== Second Continental Congress and judicial service ==
In 1776, Hopkinson served as a delegate to the Second Continental Congress (Continental Congress) from June 21 through November 18. He was a signer of the United States Declaration of Independence, representing New Jersey. He was the Chairman of the Navy Board in Philadelphia from November 18, 1776, to mid-August 1778. He was treasurer for the Continental Loan Office in Philadelphia from 1778 to 1781. He was judge of the Admiralty Court of Pennsylvania from 1779 to 1789.

While sitting on the court, in December 1780 Hopkinson was impeached on allegations of accepting payment from litigants, accepting bribes in exchange for appointments, and trading in false certificates. After an impeachment trial, he was acquitted and remained in office. He was a member of the Pennsylvania Convention which ratified the United States Constitution.

Hopkinson was nominated by President George Washington on September 24, 1789, to the United States District Court for the District of Pennsylvania, to a new seat authorized by 1 Stat. 73. He was confirmed by the United States Senate on September 26, 1789, and received his commission the same day.

== Cultural contributions ==
Hopkinson wrote popular airs and political satires (jeux d'esprit) in the form of poems and pamphlets. Some were widely circulated and powerfully assisted in arousing and fostering the spirit of political independence that issued in the American Revolution. His principal writings are A Pretty Story ... (1774), a satire about King George; The Prophecy (1776); and The Political Catechism (1777). Other notable essays are "Typographical Method of conducting a Quarrel", "Essay on White Washing", and "Modern Learning".

Hopkinson began to play the harpsichord at age seventeen and, during the 1750s, hand-copied arias, songs, and instrumental pieces by many European composers. He is credited as being the first American-born composer to commit a composition to paper with his 1759 composition "My Days Have Been So Wondrous Free". By the 1760s, he was playing with professional musicians in concerts.

Some of his more notable songs include "The Treaty", "The Battle of the Kegs", and "The New Roof, a song for Federal Mechanics". He also played organ at Philadelphia's Christ Church and composed or edited a number of hymns and psalms including: "A Collection of Psalm Tunes with a few Anthems and Hymns Some of them Entirely New, for the Use of the United Churches of Christ Church and St. Peter's Church in Philadelphia" (1763), "A psalm of thanksgiving, Adapted to the Solemnity of Easter: To be performed on Sunday, the 30th of March, 1766, at Christ Church, Philadelphia" (1766), and "The Psalms of David, with the Ten Commandments, Creed, Lord's Prayer, &c. in Metre" (1767). In the 1780s, Hopkinson modified a glass harmonica to be played with a keyboard and invented the Bellarmonic, an instrument that utilized the tones of metal balls.

At his alma mater, University of Pennsylvania, one of the buildings in the Fisher-Hassenfeld College House is named after him.

== Great Seal of the United States ==
In 1776, Hopkinson designed the Great Seal of New Jersey with assistance from Pierre Eugene du Simitiere in 1776. He was thus chosen as a consultant to design the Great Seal of the United States. Fourteen men worked on the Great Seal of the United States, including two other consultants—Simitiere (first Great Seal committee) and William Barton (third committee). The seal was finalized on June 20, 1782.

In the current rendition of the Great Seal of the United States, the 13 stars (constellation) representing the 13 original states have five points. They are arranged in the shape of a larger star with six points. The constellation comprising 13 smaller stars symbolizes the national motto, "E pluribus unum." Originally, the design had individual stars with six points, but this was changed in 1841 when a new die was cast. This seal is now impressed upon the reverse of the United States one-dollar bill. The reverse of the seal, designed by Barton, contains an unfinished pyramid below a radiant eye. The unfinished pyramid was an image used by Hopkinson when he designed the Continental $50 currency bill.

== United States Flag ==
Francis Hopkinson's flag for the U.S., an interpretation, with 13 six-pointed stars arranged in five rows

Hopkinson Flag for the U.S. Navy, an interpretation

On June 14, 1777, the Second Continental Congress adopted the Stars and Stripes as the first official national flag of the newly independent United States (later celebrated as Flag Day). The resolution creating the flag came from the Continental Marine Committee. Hopkinson became a member of the committee in 1776. At the time of the flag's adoption, he was the chairman of the Navy Board, which was under the Marine Committee. Today, that office has been transferred to the United States Secretary of the Navy.

Hopkinson is recognized as a designer of the Flag of the United States, and the journals of the Continental Congress support this. On May 25, 1780, Hopkinson wrote a letter to the Continental Board of Admiralty mentioning several patriotic designs he had completed during the previous three years. One was his Board of Admiralty seal, which contained a shield of seven red and six white stripes on a blue field. Others included the Treasury Board seal, "7 devices for the Continental Currency," and "the Flag of the United States of America." Hopkinson noted that he had not asked for any compensation for the designs but was seeking a reward: "a Quarter Cask of the public Wine." The board sent that letter on to Congress.

Hopkinson submitted another bill on June 24 for his "drawings and devices." In this second letter, Hopkinson did not mention designing the flag of the United States. Instead, the first item listed was "the great Naval Flag of the United States" along with the other contributions. This flag with its red outer stripes was designed to show up well on ships at sea. A parallel flag for the national flag was most likely intended by Hopkinson with white outer stripes as on the Great Seal of the United States and on the Bennington flag, which commemorated 50th anniversary of the founding of the United States in 1826.

For the various designs, Hopkinson asked for cash in the amount of £2,700. Auditor General James Milligan commissioned an evaluation of the request for payment. The report from the commissioner of the Chamber of Accounts said that the bill was reasonable and ought to be paid. Congress asked for an itemized bill for payment in cash. Hopkinson requested £9 for the naval flag. A committee investigated Hopkinson's charges that his payment was being delayed for arbitrary reasons. The Treasury Board turned down the request in an October 27, 1780, report to Congress. The Board cited several reasons for its action, including the fact that Hopkinson "was not the only person consulted on those exhibitions of Fancy [that were incidental to the Board (among them, the U.S. flag, the Navy flag, the Admiralty seal, and the Great Seal with a reverse)], and therefore cannot claim the sole merit of them and not entitled in this respect to the full sum charged." The reference to the work of others is most probably a reference to his work on the Great Seal. Therefore, he would not be eligible to be paid for the Great Seal. Furthermore, the Great Seal project was still a work in progress. No known committee of the Continental Congress was documented with the assignment to design the national flag or naval flag.

There is no known sketch of a Hopkinson flag—either U.S. or naval—in existence today. However, he incorporated elements of the two flags he designed in his rough sketches of the Great Seal of the United States and his design for the Admiralty Board Seal. The rough sketch of his second Great Seal proposal has seven white stripes and six red stripes. The impression of Hopkinson's Admiralty Board Seal has a chevron with seven red stripes and six white stripes. The Great Seal reflects Hopkinson's design for a governmental flag, and the Admiralty Board Seal reflects Hopkinson's design for a naval flag. Both flags were intended to have 13 stripes. Because the original stars used in the Great Seal had six points, Hopkinson's U.S. flag might also have intended the use of six-pointed stars. This is bolstered by his original sketch for the Great Seal that featured a U.S. flag with six-pointed asterisks for stars. The stripe arrangement would have been consistent with other flags of the period that had seven stripes below the canton, or blue area with stars. For example, two of the earliest known examples of Stars and Stripes flags were painted by a Dutch artist who witnessed the arrival of Navy Lieutenant John Paul Jones' squadron in Texel, The Netherlands, in 1779. The two flags have seven stripes below the canton.

== Personal life ==
Hopkinson was the son of Thomas Hopkinson and Mary Johnson Hopkinson. He married Ann Borden on September 1, 1768. They had five children. He was the father of Joseph Hopkinson, who was a member of the United States House of Representatives and also became a federal judge. Hopkinson's sister Mary (1742–1785) was married to Dr. John Morgan, second chief physician and director general of the Continental Army. According to Pennsylvania tax records and a Philadelphia census, Hopkinson owned at least two slaves.

== Death ==
On May 9, 1791, Hopkinson died in Philadelphia of a sudden apoplectic seizure, i.e. stroke. He was interred in Christ Church Burial Ground in Philadelphia.

== See also ==
- Francis Hopkinson House, listed on the National Register of Historic Places in Burlington County, New Jersey
- Memorial to the 56 Signers of the Declaration of Independence

=== Bibliography ===
==== Books ====
- The Miscellaneous Essays and Occasional Writings of Francis Hopkinson, Esq Printed by T. Dobson, 1792. Available via Google Books: Volume I, Volume II, Volume III
- Judgments in the Admiralty of Pennsylvania in four suits Printed at T. Dobson and T. Lang, 1789. Available via Internet Archive

==== Essays ====
- A Pretty Story Written in the Year of Our Lord 1774. Printed by John Dunlap, 1774. Available via Google Books
- "Dissertation IV," in Four Dissertations, on the Reciprocal Advantages of a Perpetual Union between Great-Britain and Her American Colonies. Printed by William & Thomas Bradford, 1766. Available via the U.S. National Library of Medicine, Digital Collections

=== Musical compositions ===
- Collection of Plain Tunes with a Few from Anthems and Hymns. Printed by Benjamin Carr, 1763.
- Temple of Minerva. (The First American Opera) Printed by Benjamin Carr, 1781.
- Seven Songs for the Harpsichord or Forte Piano. Printed by T. Dobson, 1788.
  - No. 3: "Beneath a weeping willow's shade"

== Sources ==
- Francis Hopkinson holdings at the Historical Society of Pennsylvania Online Public Access Catalog.
- Mastai, Bolesław; Mastai, Marie-Louise d'Otrange (1973). The Stars and the Stripes; the American flag as art and as history from the birth of the Republic to the present. New York, Knopf, 1973. ISBN 0-394-47217-9.
- Znamierowski, Alfred (2001). The World Encyclopedia of Flags. Hermes House. ISBN 1-84309-042-2.
- United States Congress. "Francis Hopkinson (id: H000783)". Biographical Directory of the United States Congress.

Legal offices
| Preceded by Seat established by 1 Stat. 73 | Judge of the United States District Court for the District of Pennsylvania; 1789–1791 | Succeeded by William Lewis |
