= Lemon Hill =

Historic house in Pennsylvania, United States

- Fairmount Park, Lemon Hill
- U.S. National Register of Historic Places
- U.S. Historic district – Contributing property
- Philadelphia Register of Historic Places
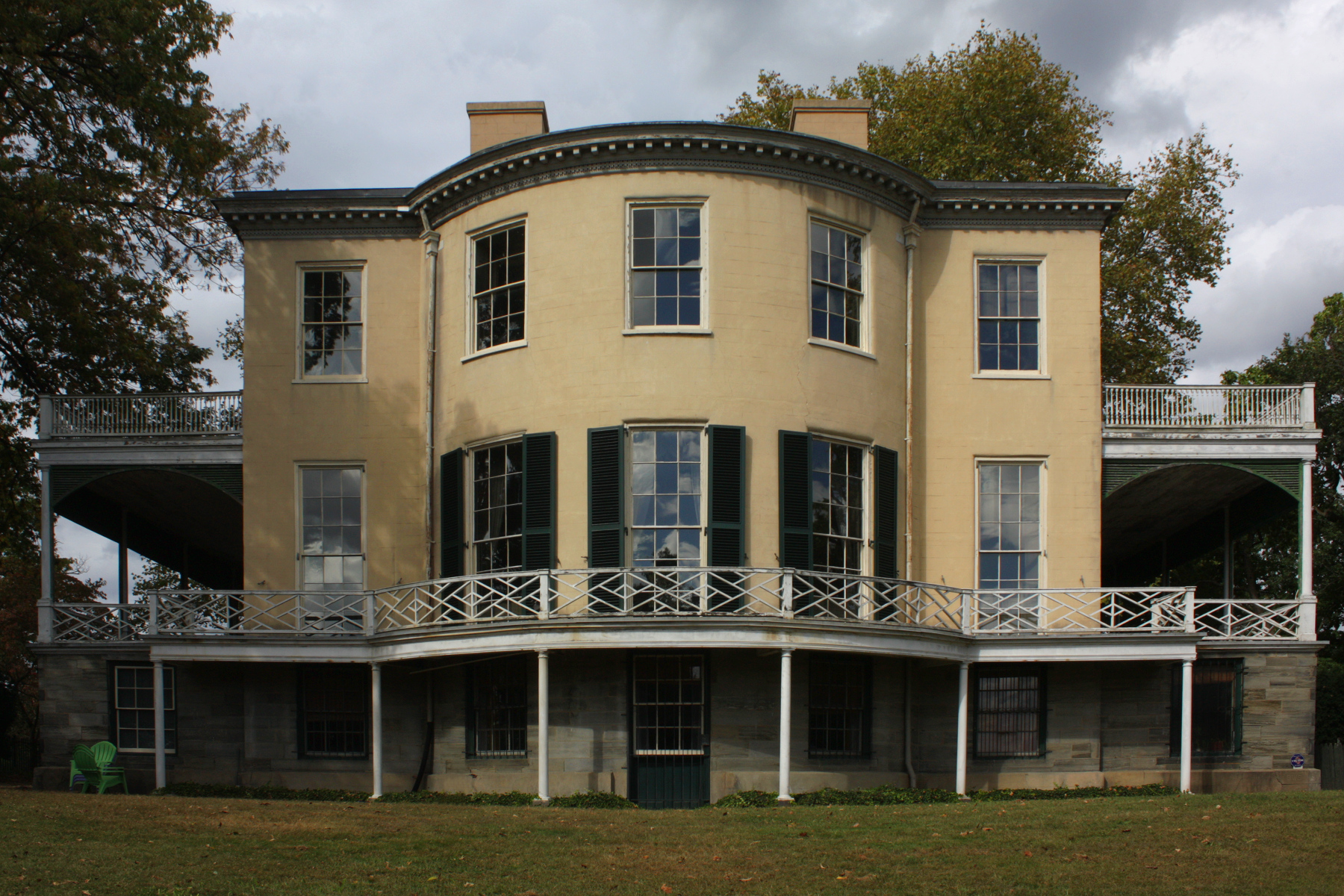
- Rear elevation with oval wall

- Location within Philadelphia Location within Pennsylvania Location within the United States
- Location: Philadelphia, Pennsylvania
- Coordinates: 39°58′15″N 75°11′14″W
- Built: c. 1800
- Architect: Henry Pratt
- Architectural style: Federal
- NRHP reference No.: 72001151

Significant dates
- Designated CP: February 7, 1972
- Designated PRHP: June 26, 1956

Lemon Hill is a Federal-style mansion in Fairmount Park, Philadelphia, built from 1799 to 1800 by Philadelphia merchant Henry Pratt. The house is named after the citrus fruits that Pratt cultivated on the property in the early 19th century.

== History and architecture ==
The mansion is situated on a parcel of land formerly part of Robert Morris's 300-acre (120 ha) estate, "The Hills." In 1799 Pratt purchased 43 acres (17 ha) of "The Hills" and accompanying structures at a sheriff's sale for $14,654 after occupant Morris suffered financial misfortunes and was taken to debtors' prison. Pratt designed the house and supervised its construction, though he did not live year-round at Lemon Hill: his primary residence was in a townhouse on Front Street.

Lemon Hill is located on a bluff overlooking the Schuylkill River and Boathouse Row. Exceptional architectural features include its three oval parlors, stacked one on top of the other, with curved fireplace mantles and doors. Pratt also landscaped the property in the English landscape garden style, extended a greenhouse structure Morris had built, and opened the grounds to the public for an entry fee.

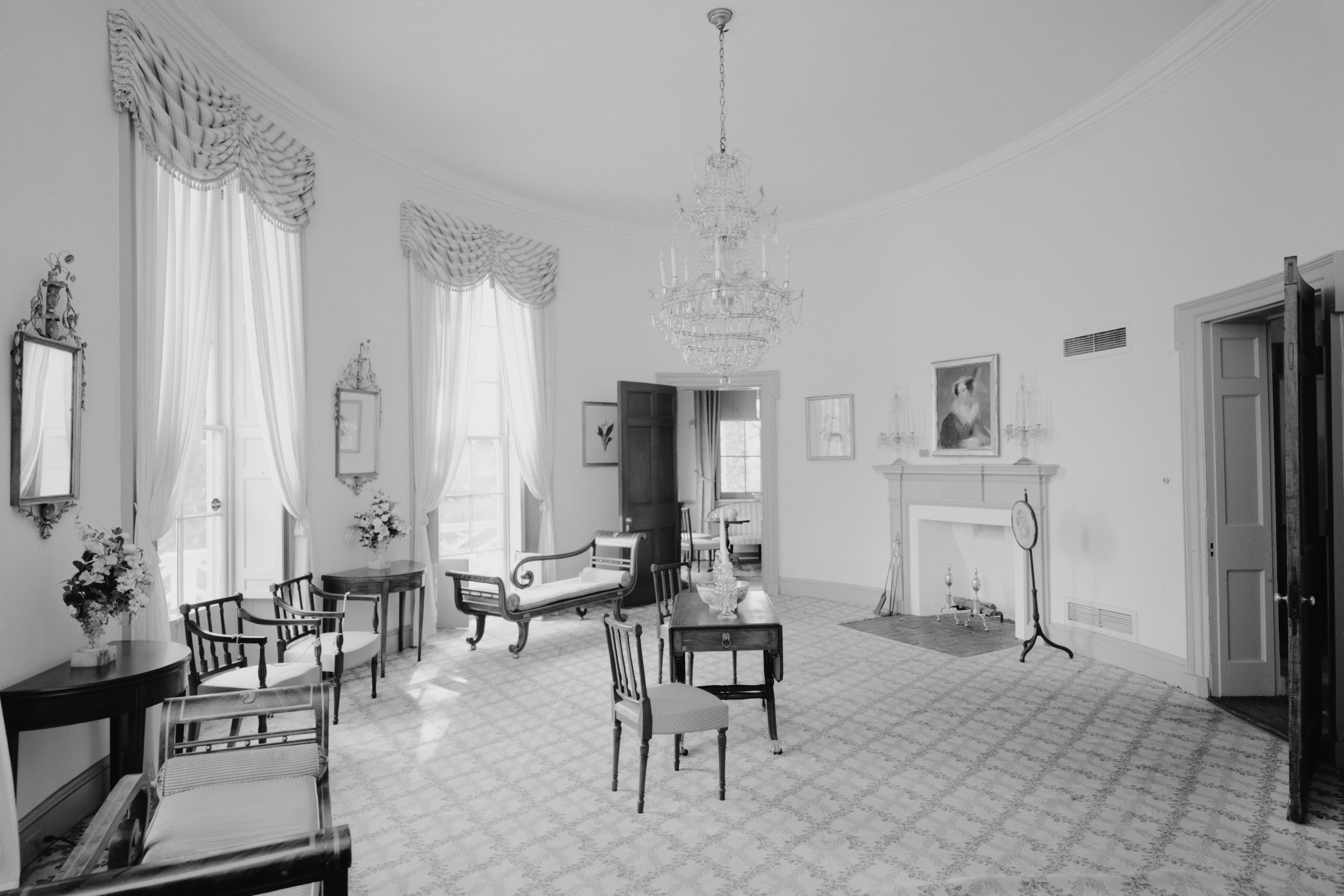
Interior of south oval room

To protect its water supply, the City of Philadelphia began purchasing properties along the Schuylkill River, beginning with Lemon Hill in 1844. The Lemon Hill estate was the first to be incorporated into the new Fairmount Park in 1855. During the second half of the 19th century, the mansion was used as a restaurant and received substantial modifications to its exterior, including a Victorian cast-iron porch.

From 1926 to 1955, the house was used as a residence by the first director of the Philadelphia Museum of Art, Fiske Kimball, and his wife Marie Goebel Kimball. Both architectural historians, the couple restored Lemon Hill to its 1800 appearance. Kimball conjectured that Robert Morris had built the mansion; however, in 2005, Pratt's letterbooks were found at the William L. Clements Library of the University of Michigan, Ann Arbor by an assistant curator of the Art Museum. Tax records indicated that the mansion did not exist at the time Pratt had purchased the land. The records also revealed that Pratt was both the designer and general contractor for his mansion.

The house was added to the National Register of Historic Places on February 7, 1972, as an inventoried contributing structure within Fairmount Park.

Since 1957, Lemon Hill Mansion has been operated as a house museum by the Colonial Dames of America and the Friends of Lemon Hill. Long hidden by dense trees on the sides of the hill, a restoration of the historic views was undertaken in 2007, recreating the original vistas of, and from, the mansion. The Fairmount Park Conservancy has managed the house since 2016.

== See also ==
- List of houses in Fairmount Park
