= Tench Francis Jr. =

American lawyer

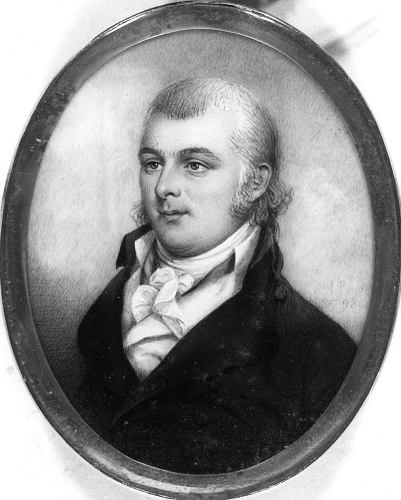
- Portrait miniature by James Peale, c. 1798
- Born: November 3, 1731; Talbot County, Maryland, British America
- Died: May 1, 1800 (aged 68); Philadelphia, Pennsylvania, U.S.
- Resting place: Christ Church Burial Ground
- Spouse: Anne Willing (m. 1762)
- Children: 7, including Thomas Willing Francis

Tench Francis Jr. (1731–1800) was an American merchant, lawyer and agent for the family of William Penn and the first cashier of the Bank of North America.

== Early life ==
Francis was born the son of Elizabeth Turbutt and Tench Francis Sr., a prominent Philadelphia lawyer and jurist, at Fausley in Talbot County, Maryland, in 1730.

== Career ==
Francis was agent for the William Penn family in connection with their proprietary interests in the colonial-era Province of Pennsylvania. He was the first cashier of the Bank of North America, a position he held until his death. He is said to have contributed £5,000 for the support of the Continental Army.

Francis later headed the commission that laid out the city of Pittsburgh. His appointment as Purveyor of Public Supplies on February 23, 1795, unified U.S. Navy pursers under a single person, which created the Navy Supply Corps.

== Personal life ==
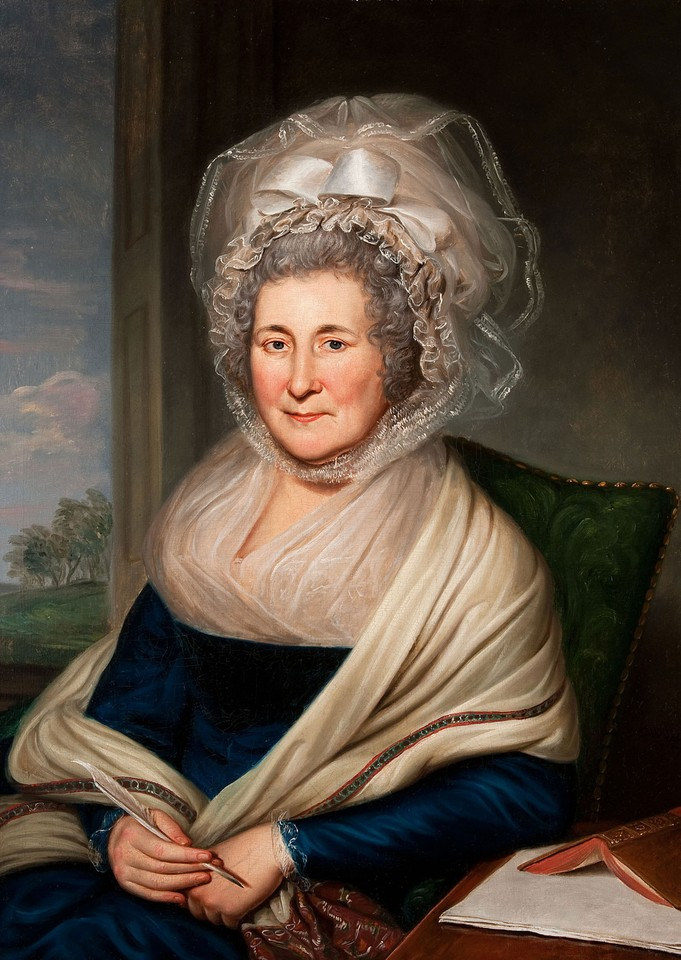
A portrait of Francis' wife Ann Willing by Charles Willson Peale

Francis married Ann Willing, daughter of Philadelphia mayor Charles Willing and his wife, Ann Shippen, on February 8, 1762.

== Death ==
Francis died in Philadelphia, on May 1, 1800; he is interred in Christ Church Burial Ground in Philadelphia.
