= Turbutt Francis =

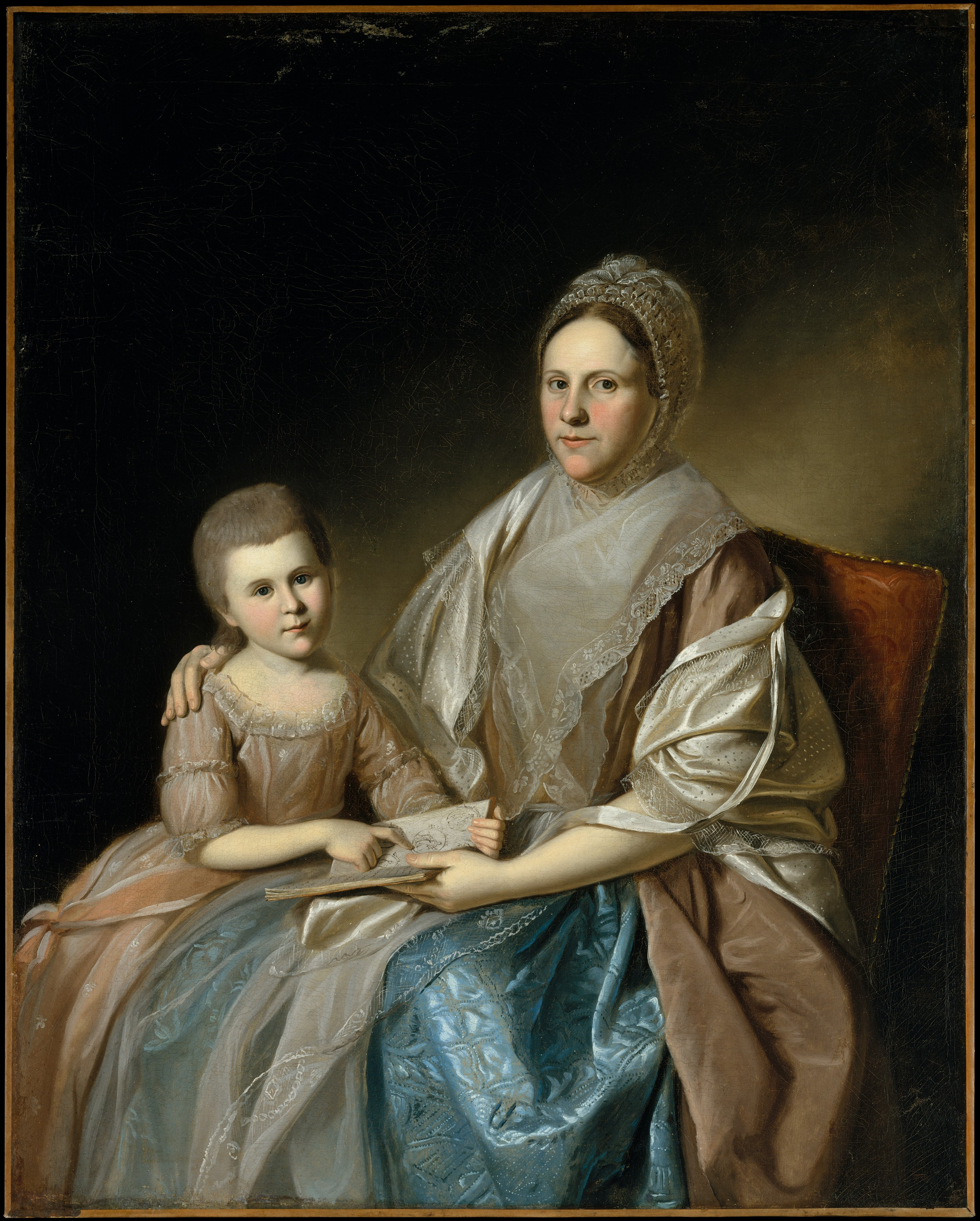
Francis' mother-in-law, Mrs. Samuel Mifflin, and his daughter, Rebecca Mifflin Francis, by Charles Willson Peale

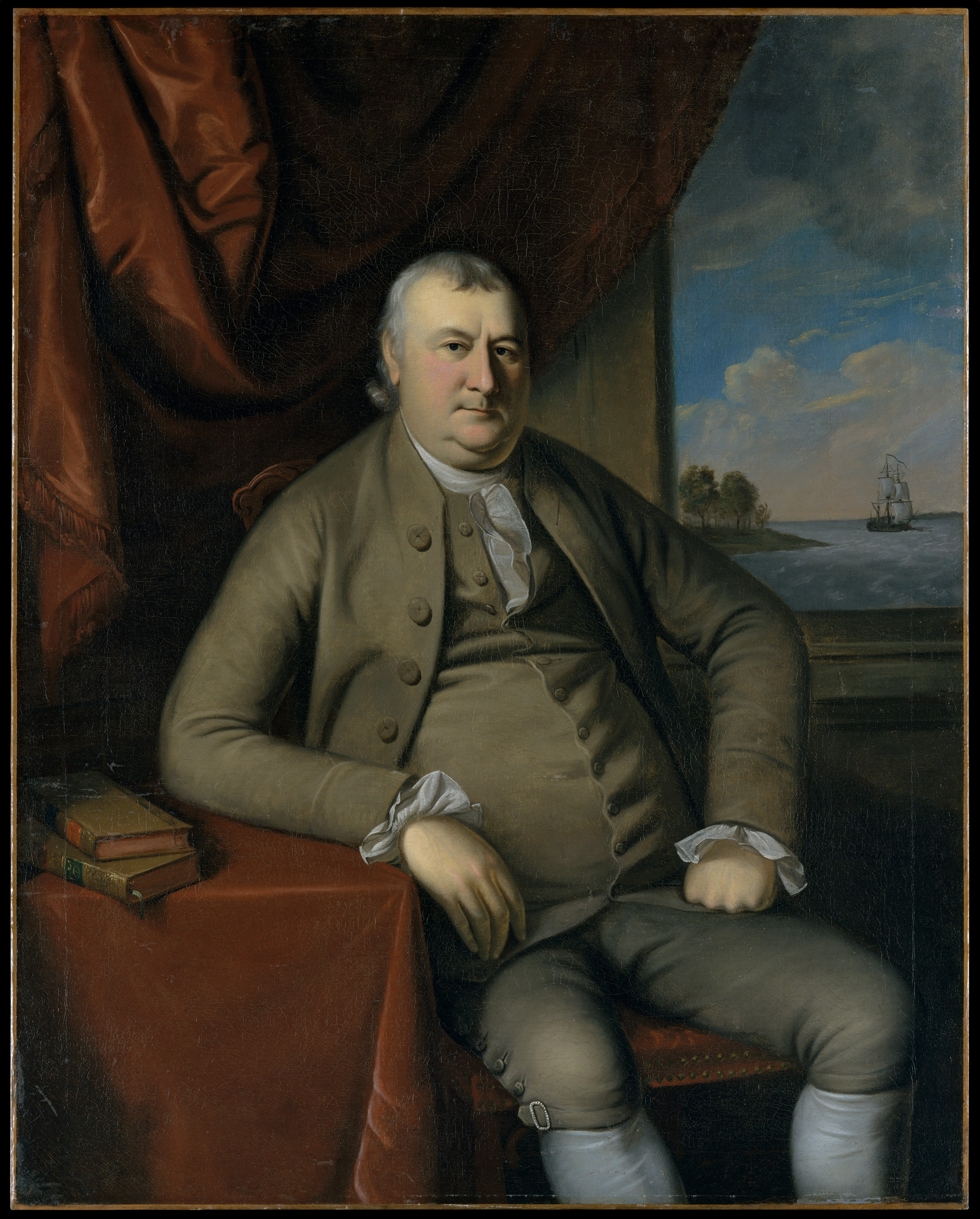
Francis' father-in-law, Samuel Mifflin, by Charles Willson Peale, circa 1777-1780

Colonel Turbutt Francis (1740 in Philadelphia – before 1797 in Pennsylvania), was an officer in the Pennsylvania Troops during Pontiac's War.

== Early life ==
Turbutt Francis was the son of Elizabeth Turbutt and Tench Francis, Sr.

== Career ==
He served as an officer in the Pennsylvania Troops during Pontiac's War and achieved the rank of Colonel. In 1769, he was stationed at Ft. Augusta, or Sunbury, Pennsylvania. In March 1772, he was commissioned by the Governor of Pennsylvania to be one of the first justices in the new county of Northumberland, Pennsylvania. Elected by the Continental Congress in 1775 as a commissioner for Indian affairs in the Northern Department.

In 1773, Turbutt returned to Philadelphia and resided there. In the Shippen Papers it is stated that Turbutt Francis died in 1797 but local records from Buffalo Township, Northumberland County, Pennsylvania say he was dead in 1782.

== Personal life ==
On September 7, 1770 he married Sarah Mifflin, daughter of Samuel Mifflin. Together, Turbett and Sarah had:

- Rebecca Mifflin Francis
- Tench Mifflin Francis
- Samuel Mifflin Francis

A portrait of his daughter and mother-in-law was painted by Charles Willson Peale, as well as a portrait of his Father-in-law Samuel Mifflin.

=== Legacy ===
Turbot Township and the Borough of Turbotville, both in Northumberland County, Pennsylvania are named for him.
