= Tench Francis Sr. =

American lawyer

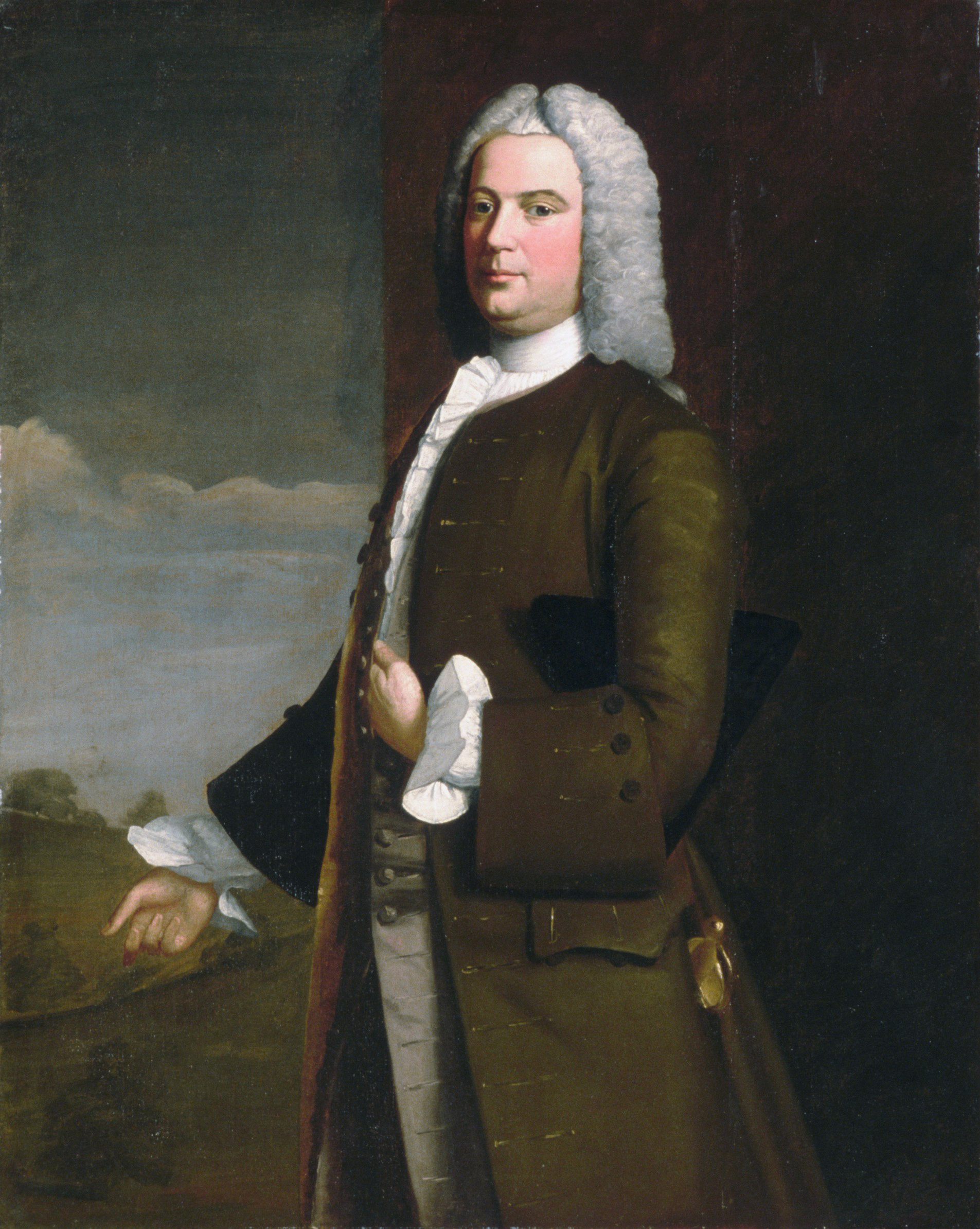
1746 portrait of Francis by Robert Feke

Tench Francis (? probably in Philadelphia – 16 August 1758) was an American lawyer and jurist in colonial Maryland and Philadelphia.

== Early life ==
Francis was the son of Rev. John Francis, Dean of Linsmore and Rector of St. Mary's Church in Dublin, Ireland.

== Career ==
=== Maryland ===
Sometime before 1720, after studying law in London, he moved to America as an attorney for Lord Baltimore. In Kent County, Maryland, he opened a law office. From 1726 to 1734 he was clerk of Talbot County Court before being elected for a three-year term as legislative representative for Talbot County.

=== Pennsylvania ===
He later settled in Philadelphia, where he was attorney-general of Pennsylvania, succeeding Andrew Hamilton, from 1741 to 1755, and recorder of Philadelphia from 1750 to 1755.

He was a founding trustee of the college, academy, and Charitable Schools of Philadelphia (which became the University of Pennsylvania), and he sent his sons Philip and Turbutt there to study.

== Personal life ==
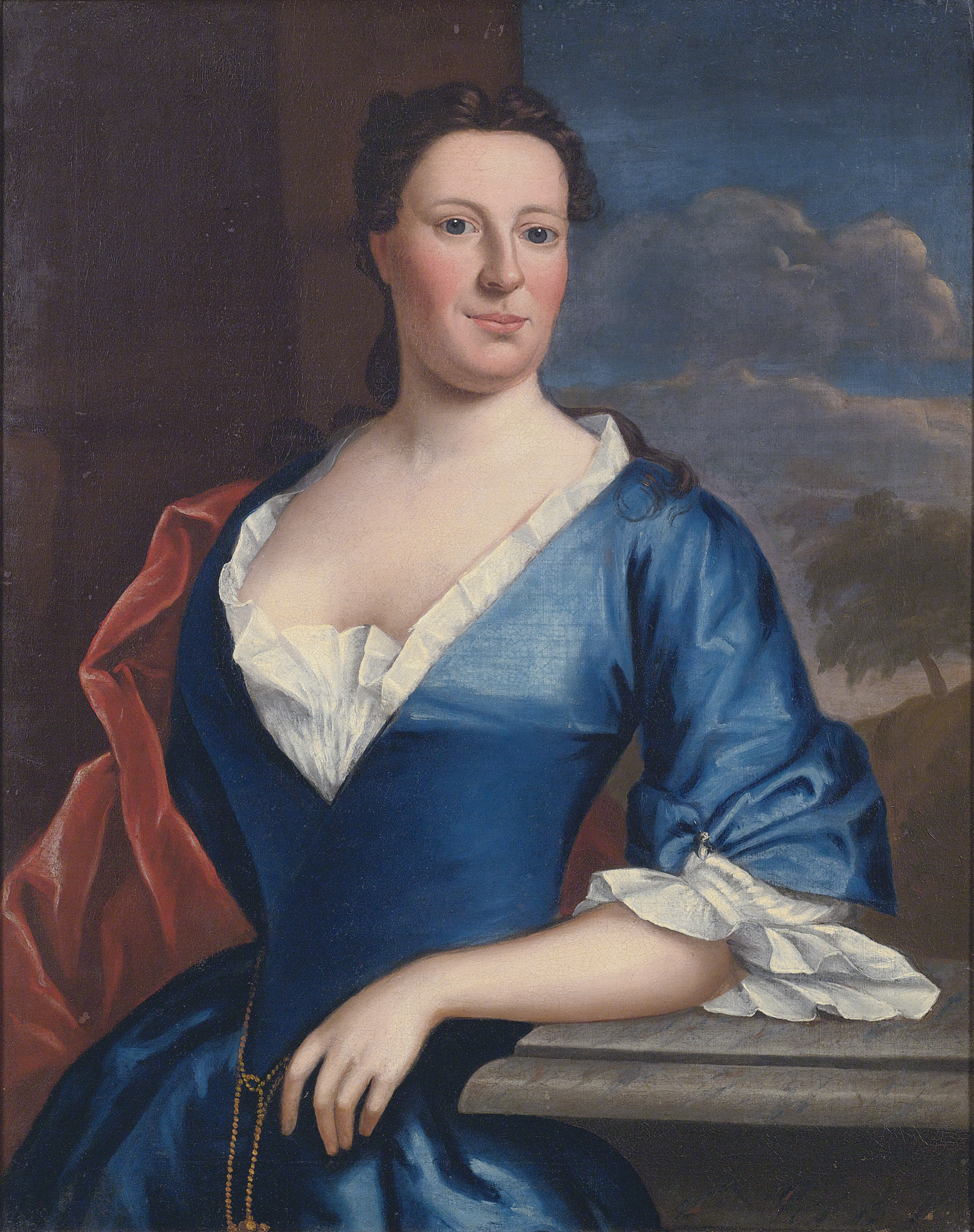
A portrait of Francis' wife, Elizabeth Francis (1708-1800), by Robert Feke, c. 1748

In 1724, he married Elizabeth Turbutt. Together, they had:

- Rachel Francis, who married John Retfe
- Turbutt Francis, who married Sarah Mifflin; later their descendants dropped the surname Francis and used the name Mifflin
- Philip Francis, who married Henrietta Maria Goldsborough, who were the grandparents of Philip Francis Thomas
- Ann Francis, who married James Tilghman, who were the parents of Tench Tilghman, who became an aide to George Washington
- Mary Francis, who married William Coxe, who were the parents of Tench Coxe, a delegate from Pennsylvania to the last Continental Congress
- Elizabeth Francis, who married John Lawrence, later Mayor of Philadelphia
- Margaret Francis, who married Chief Justice Edward Shippen IV, whose daughter married Benedict Arnold
- Tench Francis Jr., who became a prominent merchant and financier in Philadelphia; married Ann Willing Francis, daughter of Philadelphia mayor Charles Willing and Anne Nancy Shippen (1710–1791) [Anne Nancy [Shippen] Francis was the granddaughter of Philadelphia Mayor Edward Shippen and aunt to Edward Shippen IV.} Anne [Willing] Francis was also the sister Mary Willing the second wife of William Byrd III

Tench Francis died in Philadelphia in 1758.
