= Henry C. Pratt (merchant) =

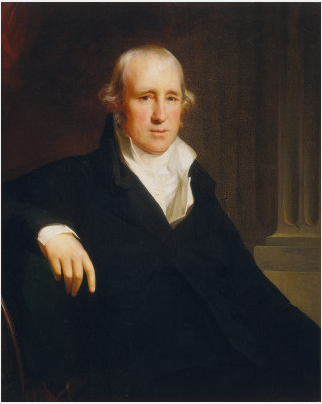
- portrait by Thomas Sully
- Born: 1761
- Died: 1838 (aged 76–77)
- Children: 14
- Parent(s): Matthew Pratt

Henry Charles Pratt (May 14, 1761 – February 6, 1838) was an American merchant and real estate developer. He was born in Philadelphia, Pennsylvania, one of six children born to Matthew Pratt (1734–1805) and Elizabeth Moore (1739–1777).

== Career ==
He was a successful merchant-trader and real estate developer. He began his career as a merchant-trader after the American Revolutionary War. In 1780 he traveled to the West Indies. From there, he imported flour and timber and exported molasses, coffee, wine, and gin.

== Marriages and children ==
He was married in 1778 to Frances Moore (b. d. 1785). They had four children: Thomas H. Pratt (September 18, 1779 – June 18, 1812); Elizabeth Pratt Kugler (May 24, 1781); Henry Pratt (November 18, 1782 – July 13, 1784); and Frances Henrietta (August 25, 1784 – July 17, 1785).

He then married Elizabeth Dundas on October 27, 1785. They had six children: Mary Ann (August 3, 1786 – August 18, 1786); Anna Marie Dundas (September 15, 1787); James Dundas Pratt (April 23, 1789); Henry Pratt (October 15, 1790); Sarah Clementina McKean (December 1, 1791); and Henry (September 13, 1793 – September 26, 1793). Elizabeth died in her 29th year.

In 1794 he married his third wife, Susannah Care; she was 18 years old and he 33. They had four children: Edmond Pratt (February 15, 1797); Henry Pratt (December 6, 1798); Charles Moore Pratt (July 7, 1800); and Amanda Pratt, (April 21, 1802). Susannah died in 1816 at 40 years old.

In total he had 14 children, of which only two outlived him.

== Lemon Hill Estate ==
In 1799 Pratt purchased 43 acres of land, originally part of Robert Morris's 300-acre estate "The Hills", at a Sheriff's sale for $14,654. Pratt designed the house himself and served as general contractor. Pratt named the estate Lemon Hill after the many lemon trees he found in Morris's greenhouse. He maintained the house and gardens as his showplace until he sold it in 1836, two years before his death. Lemon Hill then had a succession of individual owners until 1844, when it was purchased by the City of Philadelphia.

== Death ==
He died on February 6, 1838, in Philadelphia, Pennsylvania.
