= Thomas Hopkinson =

American lawyer

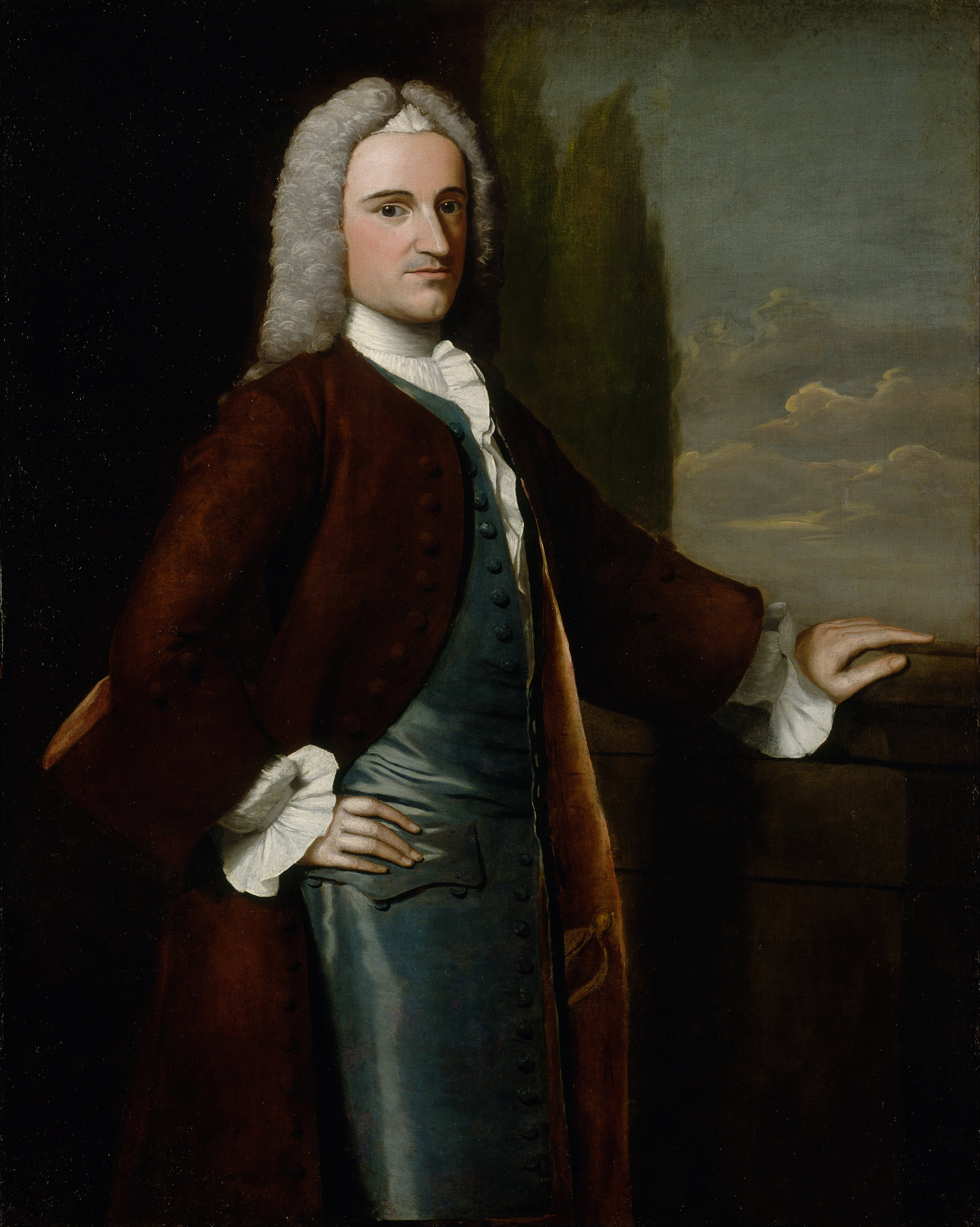
- Portrait by Robert Feke, c. 1746
- Born: April 6, 1709; London, England
- Died: November 5, 1751 (aged 42); Philadelphia, Colony of Pennsylvania, British America
- Children: Francis Hopkinson
- Parent: Thomas Hopkinson

Founding Member, American Philosophical Society, First President of the American Philosophical Society (1743-1744)
- In office 1743–1751

Thomas Hopkinson (April 6, 1709 – November 5, 1751) was a lawyer, public official, and prominent figure in colonial Philadelphia, Pennsylvania.

== Early life ==
Thomas Hopkinson was born in London, on April 6, 1709, the son of Mary Hopkinson, and Thomas Hopkinson, a London scrivener and a member of Middle Temple. He was educated there, attending Oxford University (but not graduating) and then studying law at London. He then immigrated about 1731 to Pennsylvania, where he became a merchant, lawyer, judge, and natural philosopher, as well as a friend of Benjamin Franklin.

== Career ==
He worked with Franklin on several of his experiments on electricity and was a member of the Junto. As a young barrister, he was appointed deputy to Charles Read, Clerk of the Orphans' Court of Philadelphia. Upon his death, he was commissioned as his successor on January 20, 1736–7, filling that position until November 5, 1751, when he died. On the same date, he was commissioned Master of Rolls for the city, serving until 1741.

Hopkinson held a number of legal and judicial positions, including Justice (1749), and Judge of the Vice Admiralty of the Province (1744-5). He was also a member of the Provincial (1747), and Common Councils (1741). As a merchant, Hopkinson acted as agent for several London firms, and in partnership with William Coleman, imported and sold a wide variety of goods, including fabrics, spices, gunpowder and iron. In 1747 he was the first to detect the incursions of the Spanish into Delaware Bay and was a leader in alerting public opinion as well as raising funds for the defense of the city. Under James Hamilton, he became Deputy Prothonotary, in 1748 becoming Prothonotary until his death.

Hopkinson was a founder of both the Library Company of Philadelphia, as well as an original trustee of the College of Philadelphia (now the University of Pennsylvania), and served as first president of the American Philosophical Society. He was also an active Mason. He married Mary Johnson in 1736, and together they had eight children. He enrolled his son Francis Hopkinson, later a signatory of the Declaration of Independence, in the first classes at the Academy. One of his daughters married Reverend Jacob Duché, and another Dr. John Morgan. Hopkinson was an early subscriber of the Dancing Assembly.

Franklin wrote about him: "The power of points to throw off electrical fire was first communicated to me by my ingenious friend, Thomas Hopkinson, since deceased, whose virtue and integrity in every station of life, public and private, will ever make his memory dear to those who knew him and knew how to value him".

Hopkinson was a Freemason. He was a member of St. John's Lodge and served as Grand Master of Pennsylvania in 1736.

== Family ==
Thomas Hopkinson married at Christ Church, Philadelphia on September 9, 1735, to Mary Johnson (b. August 4, 1718, Appoquinimink Hundred - d. November 9, 1804, Philadelphia). Johnson's grandfather was Sergeant-at-arms to Charles II, while her first cousin was James Johnson (bishop of Worcester).

Hopkinson died in Philadelphia on 5 November 1751. He was the father of Judge Francis Hopkinson (1737-1791) and Mary Hopkinson, (1742-1785) who became the wife of Dr. John Morgan (physician), Surgeon General of the Continental Army.

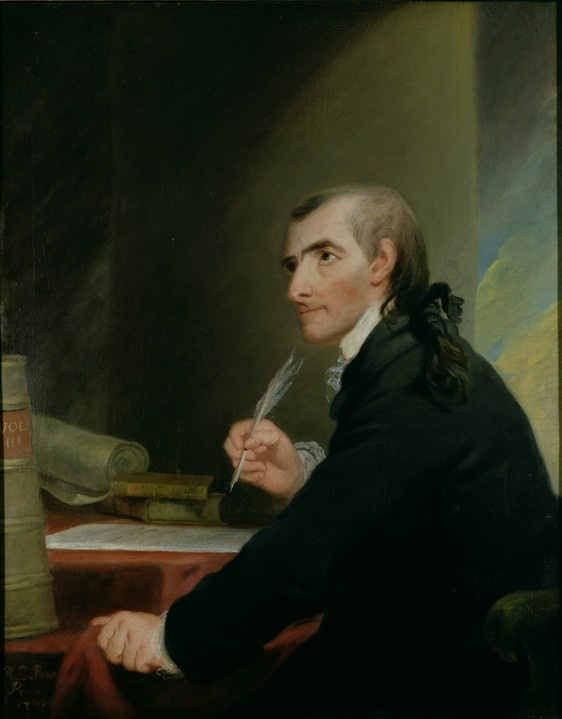
Francis Hopkinson about 1785

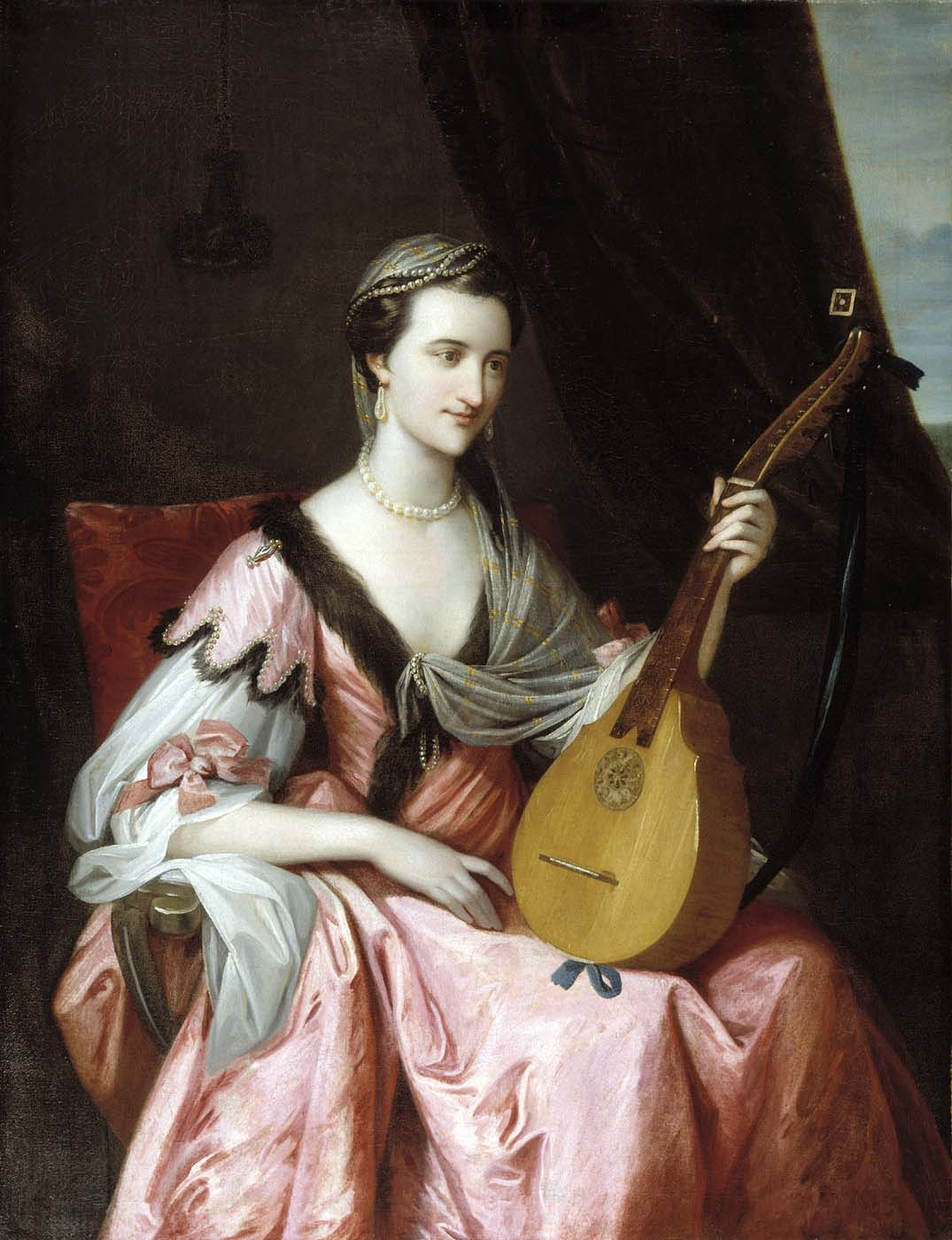
Mary (Hopkinson) Morgan about 1764
