= Tench Coxe =

American politician (1755–1824)

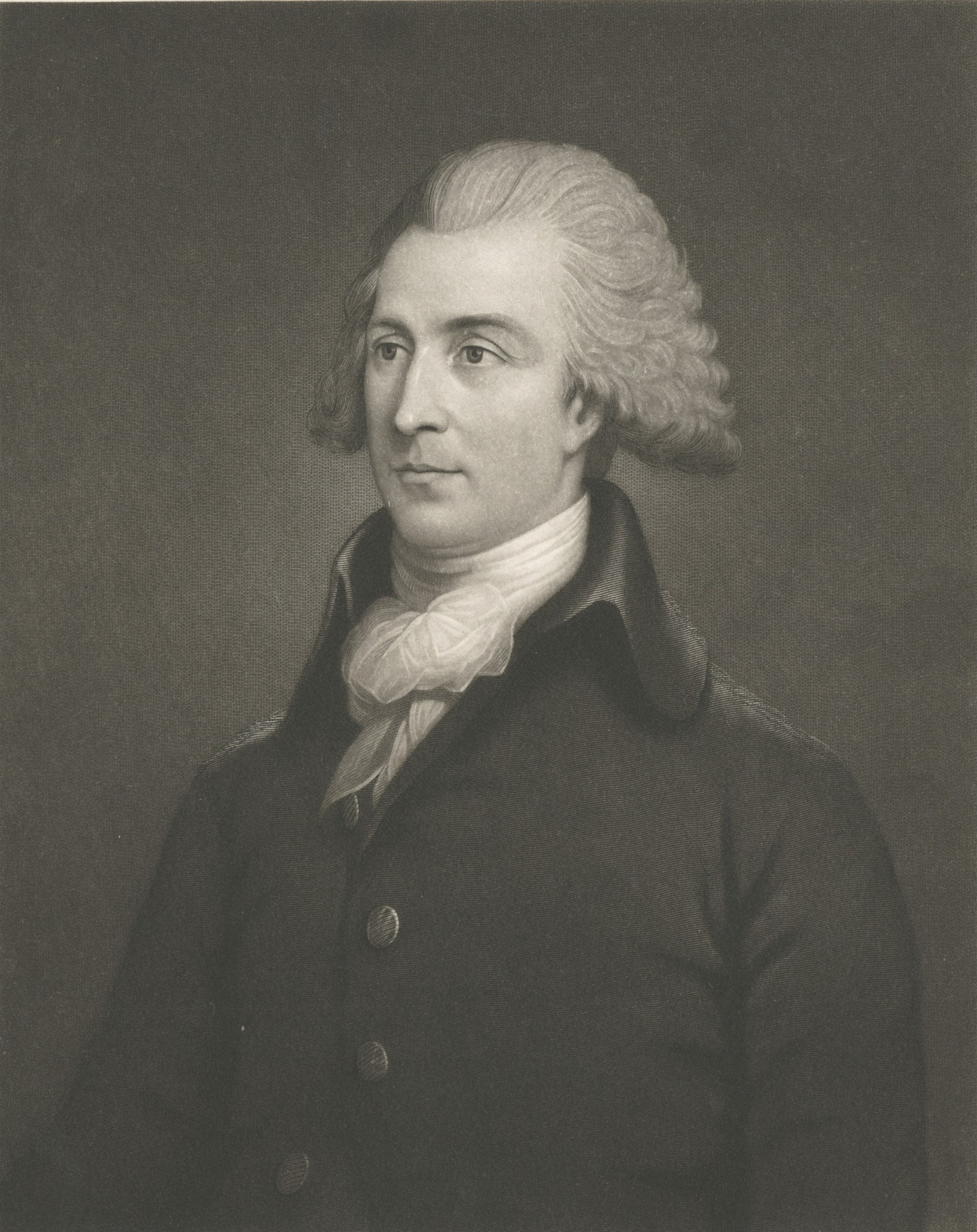
- Portrait of Coxe

1st Assistant Secretary of the Treasury
- In office September 11, 1789 – June 30, 1792
- President: George Washington

Delegate to the Continental Congress from Pennsylvania
- In office 1788

Personal details
- Born: May 22, 1755 Philadelphia, Pennsylvania, British America
- Died: July 17, 1824 (aged 69) Philadelphia, Pennsylvania, U.S.
- Party: Federalist (1787–1800); Jeffersonian (1800–1824)
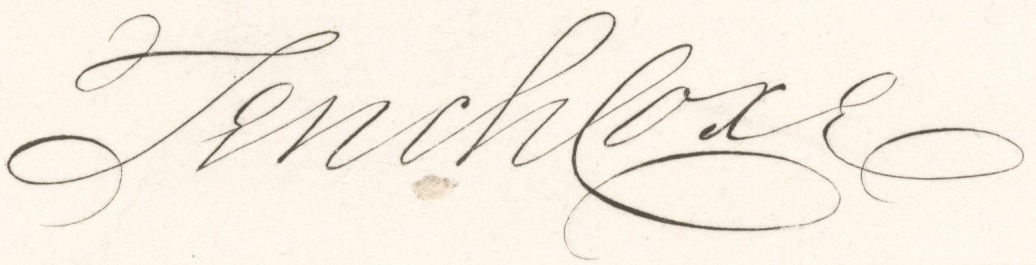
- Signature

Tench Coxe (May 22, 1755 – July 17, 1824) was an American political economist and a delegate for Pennsylvania to the Continental Congress in 1788–1789. He wrote under the pseudonym "A Pennsylvanian," and was known to his political enemies as "Mr. Facing Bothways".

== Biography ==
Coxe was born in Philadelphia, Pennsylvania, on May 22, 1755. His mother was a daughter of Tench Francis Sr. His father came of a family well known in American affairs. His great-grandfather was the governor of West Jersey, Daniel Coxe.

Tench received his education in the Philadelphia schools and intended to study law, but his father determined to make him a merchant, and he was placed in the counting-house of Coxe & Furman, becoming a partner at the age of twenty-one.

After Patriots took power, Coxe left Philadelphia for a few months, only to return when British General Howe occupied the city in September 1777. Coxe remained in Philadelphia after the British departed in 1778, and some Patriots accused him of having Royalist sympathies and of having served (briefly) in the British army. Coxe's trading successes during the period of British occupation lent considerable support to the charges, and he was arrested; although nothing came of the allegations and he was pardoned. The Pennsylvania militia records of 1780, 1787, and 1788 listed Coxe as a militia private. Of the militia, Coxe wrote,

Who are the militia? Are they not ourselves? Is it feared, then, that we shall turn our arms each man against his own bosom. Congress have no power to disarm the militia. Their swords, and every other terrible implement of the soldier, are the birthright of an American… The unlimited power of the sword is not in the hands of either the federal or state governments, but, where I trust in God it will ever remain, in the hands of the people.

— William & Mary Bill of Rights Journal

Coxe became a Whig and began a long political career. In 1786 he was sent to the Annapolis Convention and in 1788 to the Continental Congress. In September 1787, Coxe wrote three articles published in the Independent Gazetteer (Philadelphia) with the name “An American Citizen” examining the newly minted U.S. Constitution with a focus on the Presidency and the two houses of Congress and contrasting it – favorably – to the British Constitution.

Coxe next became a Federalist. A proponent of industrialization during the early years of the United States, Coxe co-authored the famous Report on Manufactures (1791) with Alexander Hamilton, providing much of the statistical data. He had been appointed Assistant Secretary of the Treasury on September 11, 1789, under Alexander Hamilton when Hamilton was Secretary of the Treasury. Coxe also headed a group called the Manufacturing Society of Philadelphia. He was appointed revenue commissioner by President George Washington on June 30, 1792, and served until removed by President John Adams. In 1796, he was elected to the American Philosophical Society.

Coxe then turned Democratic-Republican, and in the canvass of 1800 published Adams's famous letter to him regarding Pinckney. For this he was reviled by the federalists as a renegade, a tory, and a British guide, and President Thomas Jefferson rewarded him by an appointment as Purveyor of Public Supplies; he served from 1803 to 1812.

In 1804 Coxe organized and led a group at Philadelphia opposed to the election to congress of Michael Leib, and this brought him again into public notice. Though a Democratic-Republican, he was for three months daily abused by the Aurora. He was called a tory, a Federal rat, a British guide who had entered Philadelphia in 1777 with laurel in his hat, and his group was nicknamed the "quids." The term is commonly supposed to have been first applied to the little band led by John Randolph in 1806, but this is a mistake.

Coxe was a writer on political and economic subjects and a champion of tariffs to protect the new nation's growing industries. He wrote also on naval power, on encouragement of arts and manufactures, on the cost, trade, and manufacture of cotton, on the navigation act, and on arts and manufactures in the United States. He deserves, indeed, to be called the father of the American cotton industry. He was the first to attempt to bring an Arkwright machine to the United States, the first to urge Southerners to raise cotton. Coxe also acquired vast acreage of Pennsylvania timber and coal lands. This investment in lands though not much developed in Tench Coxe lifetime was the basis of wealth for his descendants.

Coxe died July 17, 1824, in Philadelphia, where he is interred in Christ Church Burial Ground.

His grandson Colonel Frank Coxe built Battery Park Hotel in Asheville, North Carolina and bought Green River Plantation in Polk County, North Carolina. His grandson, Eckley Brinton Coxe, founded MMI Preparatory School in Freeland, Pennsylvania.

== Works ==
- An Enquiry Into the Principles on Which a Commercial System for the United States of America Should be Founded; to Which Are Added Some Political Observations Connected with the Subject. 1787.
- Coxe, Tench (1791). A Brief Examination of Lord Sheffield's Observations on the Commerce of the United States: In Seven Numbers : with Two Supplementary Notes on American Manufactures.
- Coxe, Tench (1794). A View of the United States of America, in a Series of Papers, Written Between the Years 1787 and 1794: With Authentic Documents.
- The Federalist: Containing Some Strictures Upon a Pamphlet Entitled The Pretensions of Thomas Jefferson to the Presidency Examined and Charges Against John Adams Refuted, which Pamphlet was First Published in the Gazette of the United States in a Series of Essays Under the Signature of Phocion. Re-published from the Gazette of the United States by Mathew Carey, no. 118, Market-street. 1796.
- Coxe, Tench (1807). An Examination of the Conduct of Great Britain, Respecting Neutrals.
- A Memoir, of February, 1817, upon the subject of the Cotton Wool Cultivation, the Cotton Trade, and the Cotton Manufactories of the United States of America. 1817.

== See also ==
- History of accounting
- Karl von Zinzendorf
