= Charles Willing =

American politician (1710–1754)

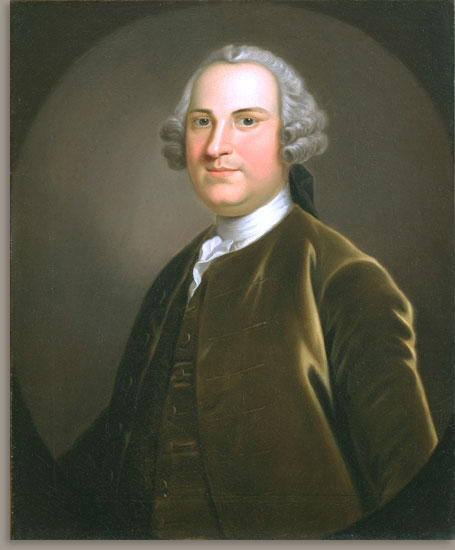

Mayor of Philadelphia
- In office 1748–1749
- Preceded by: William Attwood
- Succeeded by: Thomas Lawrence
- In office 1754–1754
- Preceded by: Thomas Lawrence
- Succeeded by: William Plumsted

Personal details
- Born: May 18, 1710 Bristol, Somerset
- Died: November 30, 1754 (aged 44) Philadelphia, Pennsylvania
- Resting place: Christ Church Burial Ground
- Spouse: Anne Shippen (m. 1731)
- Children: 11, including Thomas, James and Mary
- Parent(s): Thomas Willing; Anne Harrison
- Occupation: Merchant, politician

Charles Willing (May 18, 1710 – November 30, 1754) was an English-born merchant and politician who twice served as the mayor of Philadelphia, from 1748 until 1749 and again in 1754.

== Early life ==
Charles Willing was born in Bristol, on May 18, 1710, the son of Thomas Willing and Anne Harrison. He traveled to the Thirteen Colonies by ship and settled in Philadelphia in 1728 at the age of eighteen. His cousin, Thomas Willing, was selling land and laying out plans for a new community called Willingtown, which later became Wilmington, Delaware. While living in Willingtown, Willing became a very successful businessman and held political offices such as councilman and magistrate.

== Philadelphia ==
Later in life, Willing moved to Philadelphia. In 1743, he was elected to the Common Council. In 1745, he was appointed as Justice. Then, in 1747, Willing was appointed as one of the Justices of the City Court. The following year in 1748 he was elected as the City Mayor. While serving as mayor Willing was subsequently appointed Justice in the years 1749, 1752 and 1754. Willing was a founder and trustee of the Academy and College of Philadelphia (now the University of Pennsylvania). Willing was elected to serve a second term as mayor and during this time contracted ships fever and died on November 30, 1754.

== Legacy ==
His wife's grandfather, Edward Shippen, and his eldest son, Thomas Willing, also served as mayors of Philadelphia. Thomas was also a Delegate to the Continental Congress from Pennsylvania. His son James Willing was a representative of the American Continental Congress and led a military expedition during the American War of Independence known as the Willing Expedition.

== Career ==
Robert Morris apprenticed at the firm of Willing & Co., and later became a partner with Thomas in the renamed firm of Willing Morris & Co.

== Personal life ==
He married Anne Nancy Shippen (1710–1791) in 1731, daughter of Abigail Grosse (1677–1716) and Joseph Shippen (1678–1741), together they had eleven children, including:

Charles Willing signature

- Thomas Willing (1731–1821), who married Anne McCall (1745–1781), daughter of Samuel McCall (1721–1762)
- James Willing (1750–1801)
- Mary Willing (1740–1814), who married William Byrd III (1728–1777).
- Elizabeth Willing (1742–1830), who married Samuel Powel (1738–1793), a mayor of Philadelphia.

Charles Willing died on November 30, 1754, in Philadelphia and is buried in Christ Church Burial Ground.

Preceded by William Attwood	Mayor of Philadelphia; 1748–1749	Succeeded by Thomas Lawrence
Preceded by Thomas Lawrence (died in office)	Mayor of Philadelphia; 1754 (died in office)	Succeeded by William Plumsted
