= Elizabeth Willing Powel =

American socialite from Philadelphia

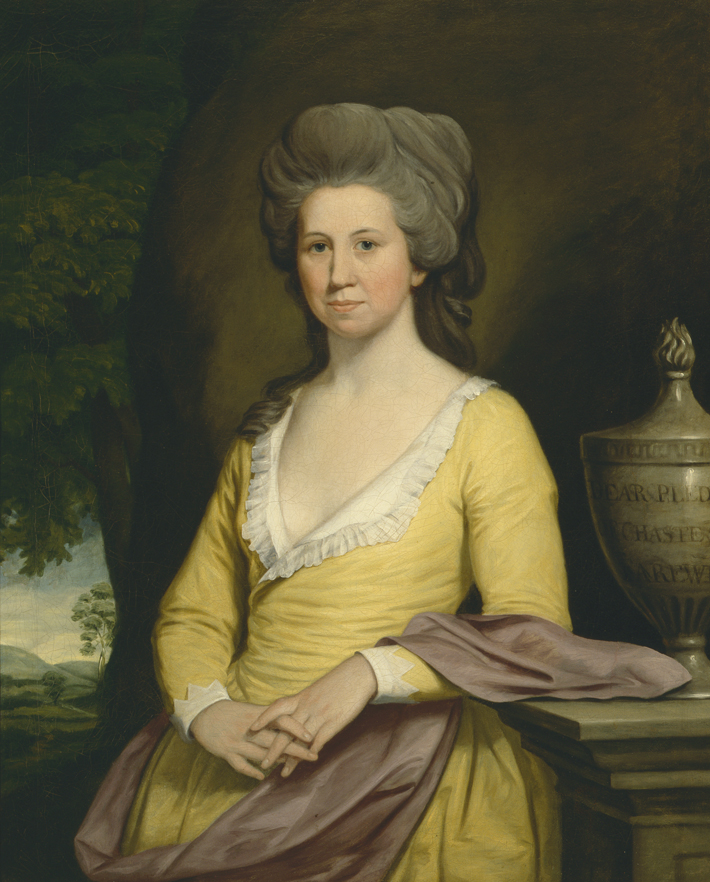
- Portrait of Powel c. 1793
- Born: Elizabeth Willing; February 21, 1743; Philadelphia, Pennsylvania, British America
- Died: January 17, 1830 (aged 86); Philadelphia, Pennsylvania, U.S.
- Resting place: Christ Church Burial Ground
- Spouse: Samuel Powel (m. 1769; died 1793)
- Parents: Charles Willing (father); Ann Shippen (mother)
- Relatives: Edward Shippen (great-grandfather); Thomas Willing (brother); James Willing (brother); Mary Willing Byrd (sister); John Hare Powel (nephew and chosen heir); Ann Willing Bingham (niece)

Elizabeth Willing Powel (February 21, 1743 – January 17, 1830) was an American socialite and a prominent member of the upper class of Philadelphia in the late 18th and early 19th centuries. The daughter, later sister and then wife of mayors of Philadelphia, she was a salonnière who hosted frequent gatherings that became a staple of political life in the city. During the First Continental Congress in 1774, Powel opened her home to the delegates and their families, hosting dinner parties and other events. After the American Revolutionary War, she again took her place among the most prominent Philadelphian socialites, establishing a salon of the Republican Court of leading intellectuals and political figures.

Powel corresponded widely, including with the political elite of the time. She was a close friend and confidante to George Washington and was among those who convinced him to continue for a second term as president. She wrote extensively, but privately, on a wide range of subjects, including politics, the role of women, medicine, education, and philosophy. Powel is said to be the person who asked Benjamin Franklin, "What have we got, a republic or a monarchy?", to which he reportedly replied, "A republic ... if you can keep it", (Note: Some sources quote Franklin's response as "A republic, madam—if you can keep it" with the inclusion of the term "madam" as James McHenry retold the story in The Republican, or Anti-Democrat newspaper on July 15, 1803. McHenry's original journal entry during the Convention reads: "A lady asked Dr. Franklin well Doctor what have we got a republic or a monarchy – A republic replied the Doctor if you can keep it.") an often quoted statement about the Constitution of the United States. The exchange was first recorded by James McHenry, a delegate of the Constitutional Convention, in his journal entry dated September 18, 1787. Powel's exchange with Franklin was adapted over time, with the role played by Powel all but removed in 20th-century versions and replaced with an anonymous "lady", "woman", or "concerned citizen". The setting of the conversation was also revised from her home at the Powel House to the steps of Independence Hall.

Her husband, Samuel Powel, one of the richest people in Philadelphia was twice elected mayor of the city. He died in 1793 and left almost his entire estate to Powel, who went on to manage the family business dealings. She built a home for her nephew and chosen heir, John Hare Powel, on the country estate which she inherited from her husband. She sold the Powel House and lived on Chestnut Street near Independence Hall for the last three decades of her life; she died on January 17, 1830, and was buried beside her husband at Christ Church. More than a century later, the Powel House was acquired by the Philadelphia Society for the Preservation of Landmarks. It was renovated and opened to the public as a museum in 1938. Two rooms from the house were reconstructed as exhibits at museums in Philadelphia and New York City. The Powels' country estate later became part of Powelton Village in Philadelphia. Hundreds of her letters and several of her portraits survive.

== Biography ==
=== Early life ===
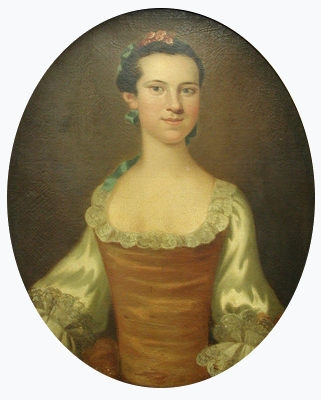
Portrait of Elizabeth Willing by John Wollaston, c. 1755–1759

Elizabeth Willing was born in Philadelphia on February 21, 1743 [O.S. February 10, 1742/43], to Charles and Ann (née Shippen) Willing. The family lived in a house on the corner of Third Street and Willings Alley in Philadelphia. Charles had immigrated to the city from England, at the age of 18, as a merchant in foreign trade. He was elected as mayor of Philadelphia in 1748 and 1754. Ann came from a Quaker family of successful merchants who had immigrated to the Colonies from England three generations prior. While the details of Elizabeth's education are unknown, according to historian David W. Maxey, the family was wealthy enough to afford private tutoring, and the content of Elizabeth's writing indicates a quality education.

Elizabeth had five elder siblings, Thomas, Ann, Dorothy, Charles, and Mary, and five younger siblings, Richard, Abigail, Joseph, James, and Margaret. Dorothy was married to Walter Stirling in 1753, Mary to William Byrd III in 1761, and Ann to Tench Francis Jr. in 1762. Thomas inherited the family home after their father's death in 1754, a year after Margaret was born. He became mayor of Philadelphia and married Ann McCall in 1763. When they began to have children and the house became more crowded, there was increased pressure on Elizabeth, the eldest of her unmarried sisters, to find a suitor and begin a family. Rumors in 1768 spoke of Elizabeth's supposed engagement to John Dickinson, a man ten years her senior and author of the widely circulated Letters from a Farmer in Pennsylvania. Elizabeth denied any such relationship in private letters to her sister Mary, assuring her that, should such a connection exist, Mary would have been among the first to know.

=== Marriage and children ===
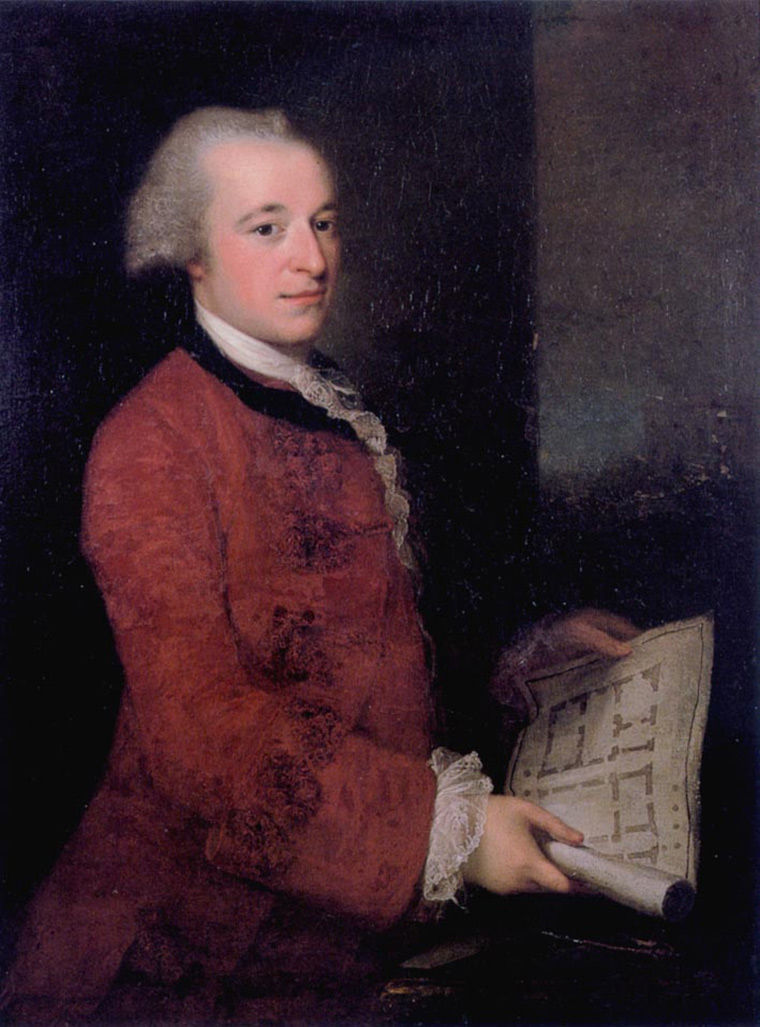
Portrait of Samuel Powel by Angelica Kauffman, c. 1764–1765

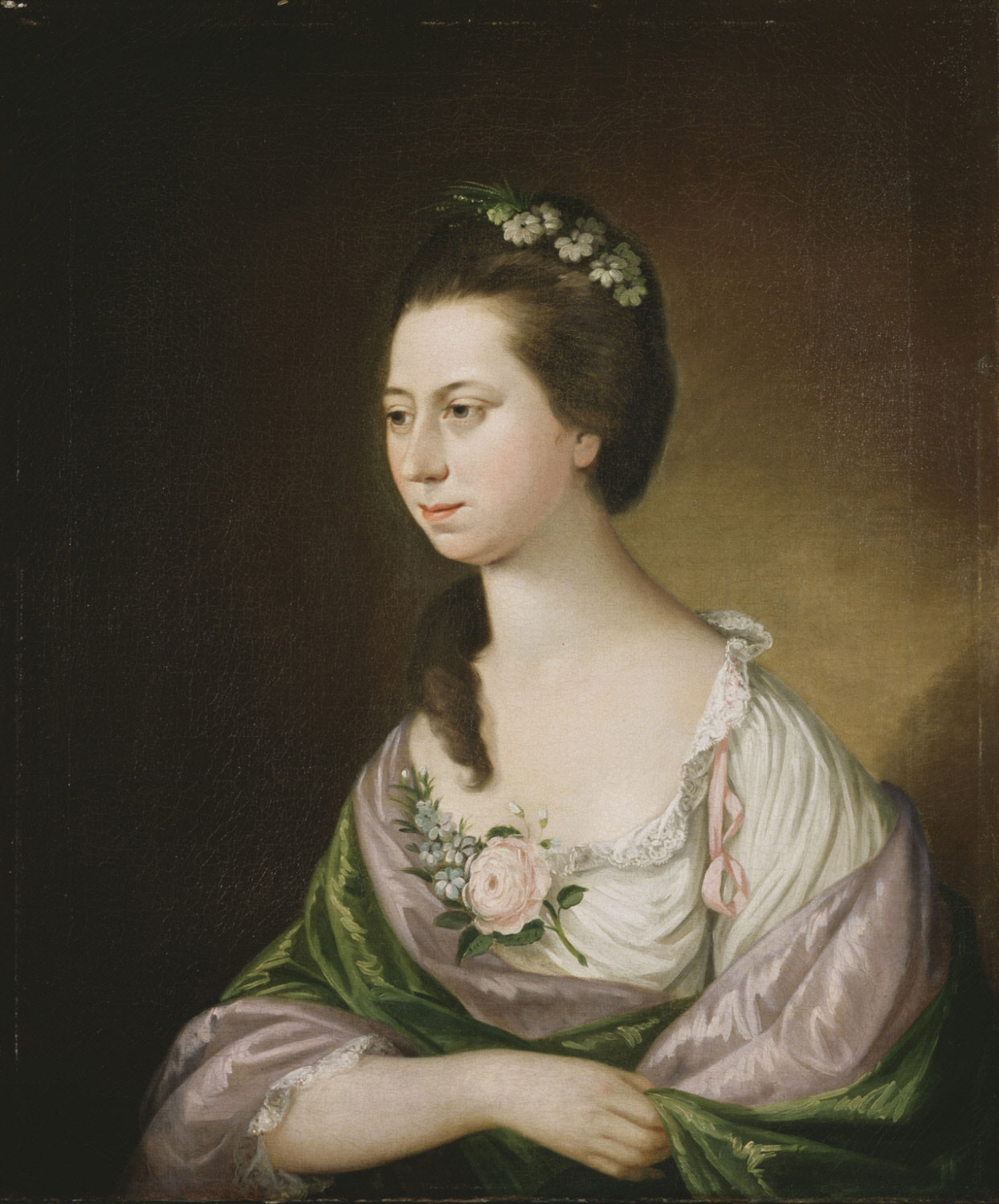
Portrait of Elizabeth Willing Powel by Matthew Pratt, c. 1768–1769

Elizabeth married Samuel Powel. Also of Quaker ancestry, he was among the richest people in Philadelphia; at 18 years old, he had inherited the fortune of his grandfather Samuel Powell, (Note: Samuel Powell, grandfather to Elizabeth's husband, was also known as the "rich carpenter".) who was among the first settlers of the Province of Pennsylvania. Powell's son, also named Samuel and father to Elizabeth's husband, died in 1747, only after having found success as a merchant and shortened his surname to Powel. Elizabeth's husband graduated from the College of Philadelphia in 1759, before he embarked on a seven-year tour of Europe to study art. He went to Rome where he sat for a portrait by the painter Angelica Kauffman and had an audience with Pope Clement XIII. In England, he was baptized into the Anglican Church like John Morgan, his companion on the tour, was before him.

Samuel and Elizabeth's marriage brought together two of the most prominent mercantile families in the city. Their wedding on August 7, 1769, was held at Christ Church and officiated by Jacob Duché. Five days before, Samuel purchased for his new family a home later known as the Powel House. Originally built in 1765 for Charles Stedman who never lived in it, the house is located on South Third Street, just south of Elizabeth's childhood home. Neighboring the Powel House to the north was the home of her sister Mary.

On a piece of black bordered paper, Powel wrote of one of her sons:

Beneath his Hillocks narrow bound
A lovely Infant lies,
Till the last Trumpet shakes the Ground
And rolls away the Skies
From all the Chequer'd Ills below
Sammy secure shall sleep
His little Heart no Pain shall know,
His Eyes no more shall weep.
Some pitying Angel view'd the Lamb
In Innocence array'd
And snach'd him from each future Snare
The World and guile had laid
When Thousands rising from the Dust
Shall tremble as they rise,
This smiling Saint, without Distrust
Shall upward lift his Eyes.

Each of the Powels' four children died young. Their first son, born on June 29, 1770, was christened Samuel Jr. before he died of smallpox on July 14, 1771. Their second child, a girl, was stillborn on August 6, 1771, or as Elizabeth wrote "at most but just breathed". Another boy was stillborn on April 2, 1772. Their fourth child was christened Samuel C. but died after only two weeks on July 11, 1775. The death of her children and the resulting depression throughout her life was reflected in her correspondence. She kept a lock of hair from both her sons named Samuel and wrote often of her loss, lamenting her unfulfilled aspirations of motherhood.

=== Salonnière ===
During the 1774 meeting of the First Continental Congress in Philadelphia, Powel opened her home to the delegates and their families, hosting dinner parties and events. Women were generally excluded from official roles in political institutions, and hosting prominent figures in domestic settings emerged as an opportunity to take a leading role in political discourse. Elizabeth's popular gatherings at the Powel House followed the conventions of French salons and became a staple of political life in the city. She encouraged political and philosophical discussion, and often opined on matters of state. Her sister, Ann Francis, wrote to their sibling Mary Byrd of the "uncommon command [Elizabeth] has of language and [how her] ideas flow with rapidity." French nobleman François-Jean de Chastellux recalled that, "contrary to American custom," rather than her husband as the foremost political thinker of the house, "she plays the leading role in the family". Chastellux also noted that Powel was "well read and intelligent; but what distinguished her most is her taste for conversation, and the truly European use that she knows how to make of her understanding and information."

With her husband, Powel created events and gatherings in their Society Hill home that included discussions about important aspects of the founding of the United States government. She played host to contemporary elites, including Benjamin Rush, the Marquis de Lafayette, and John Adams. In at least one instance, Adams recalled enjoying what, from his Puritan perspective, was "a most sinful feast". His diary records the dishes served to guests: "curds and creams, jellies, sweetmeats of all sorts, twenty kinds of tarts, truffles, floating-island, sylabubs, etc., in fact everything that could delight the eye or allure the taste." After drinking a selection of "punch, wine, porter, beer, etc. etc.", he and others were inspired to admire a view of the city by climbing the steeple of a nearby church. His wife Abigail Adams noted Powel as "the best informed, most affable, very friendly and full of conversation, a woman of many charms."

=== American Revolution ===
When the Revolutionary War began in 1775, Powel and her husband remained in the city. He was elected mayor of Philadelphia and began his first term on October 3, 1775. The Declaration of Independence was signed in July 1776 and the city government dissolved, making him the last colonial mayor of Philadelphia. His loyalty was equivocal, and he seems to have had little interest in the outcome of the war. Elizabeth's allegiance during the war remains uncertain. She was concerned with the destruction of Philadelphia. As large fires burned throughout the city, she unsuccessfully attempted to save the furniture from her sister Ann's home.

During the Philadelphia campaign, the Powel House was taken over by the British during their occupation of the city. Frederick Howard, 5th Earl of Carlisle, used it as his headquarters while leading the Peace Commission, which unsuccessfully sought an end to the war. Carlisle and his staff remained for about ten days in June 1778, forcing the Powels to move to a wing of their home normally reserved for servants. Carlisle and the Powels often dined together and discussed politics; he found them "very agreeable, sensible people". When British troops withdrew from the city, Elizabeth emerged among the most prominent Philadelphian socialites of the post-revolution period, establishing the Philadelphia salon of the Republican Court from the leading intellectual and political figures of colonial America. As the foundations of the new nation were established, the Republican Court played a key role in facilitating political affiliation and communication, in addition to cementing the social status and personal reputation of the aristocratic elite, as they adapted to the emerging democratic society.

=== Friendship with George Washington ===
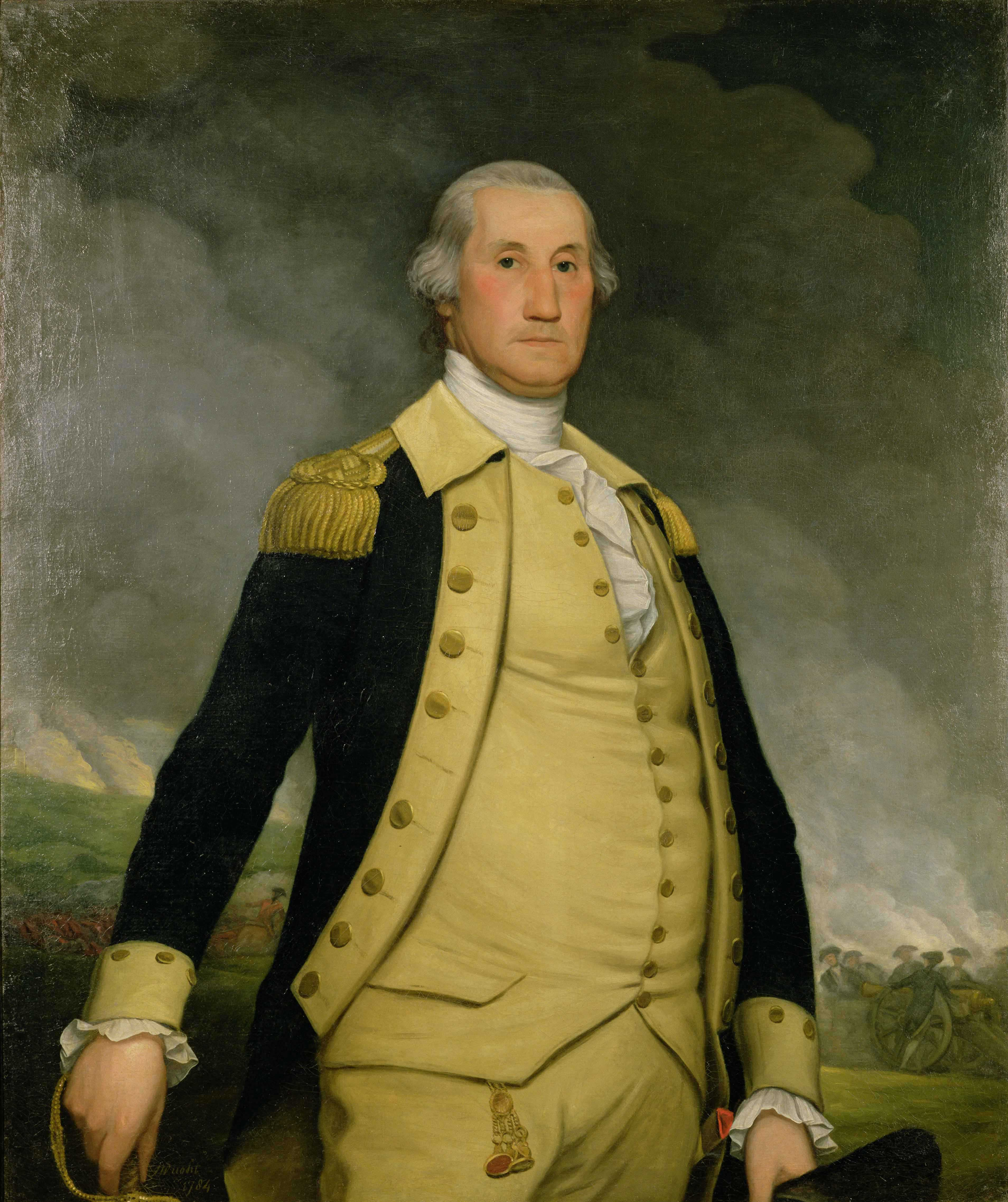
Portrait of George Washington by Joseph Wright, commissioned in 1784 by Powel and displayed in her home for the remainder her life

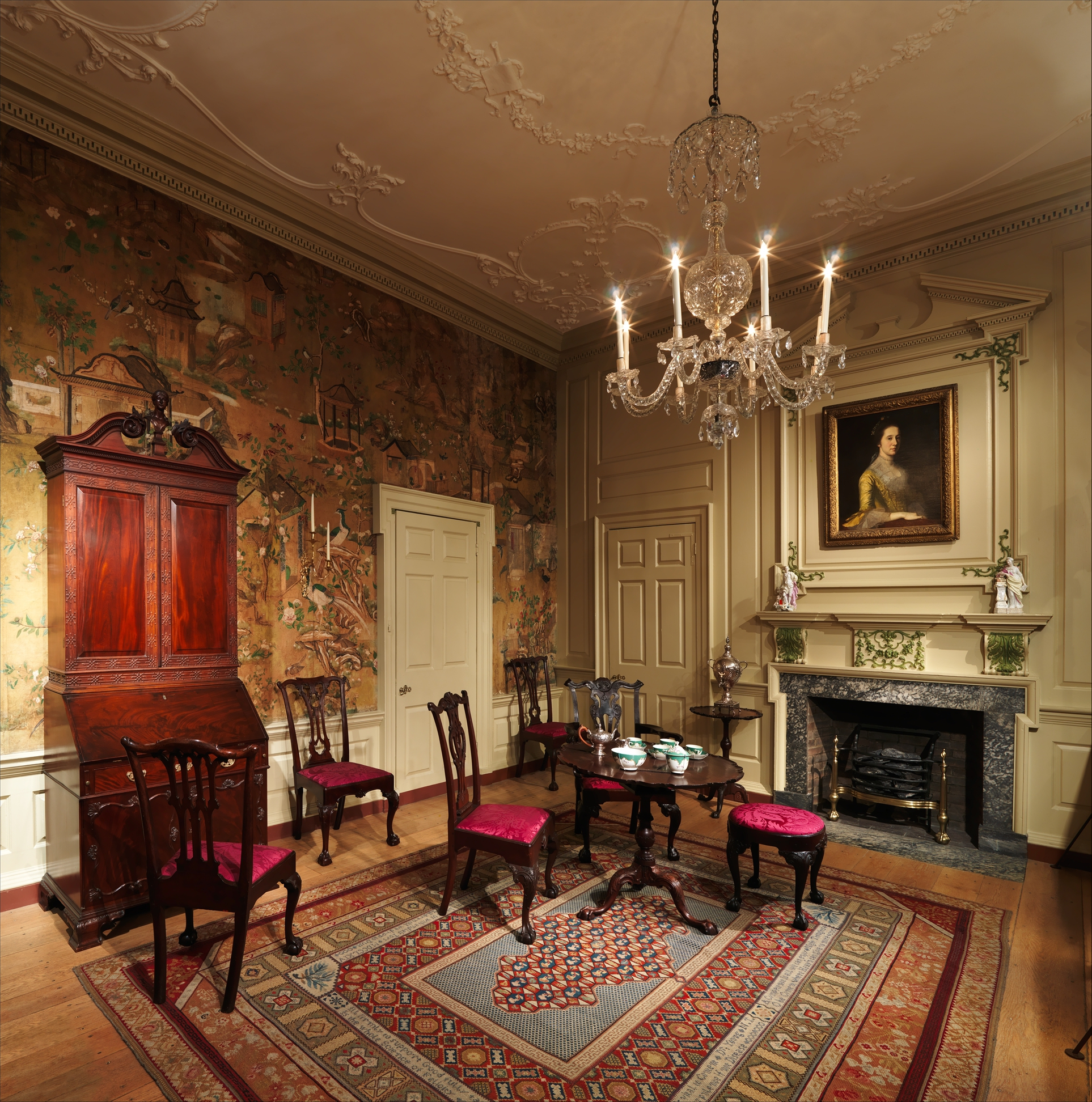
The withdrawing room from the Powel House, reconstructed as an exhibit at the Metropolitan Museum of Art in New York

Elizabeth was a close friend and confidant to George Washington, commander-in-chief of the Continental Army and later the first president of the United States. She was also a friend of his wife, Martha. The Washingtons first met the Powels in 1774, as dinner guests at notable homes in Philadelphia, while George served as a delegate of the First Continental Congress. They were officially introduced in 1779, at a Twelfth Night ball hosted by the Powels and attended by the Washingtons, who were celebrating their 20th wedding anniversary. Washington renewed his friendship with the couple when he returned to Philadelphia for the Constitutional Convention in May 1787. His diary and various letters indicate frequent visits to the home, passing mornings drinking tea and evenings dining. (Note: Mercur further recorded a letter from Sarah Franklin Bache to her father Benjamin Franklin, "Have been to a ball at the Powels' and danced the minuet with General Washington.") He visited Powel House at least 13 times, spending more time there than with any other person in the city. The Powels also visited Mount Vernon in October of the same year.

Washington's relationship with Powel was perhaps the closest of all his friendships with women in his later life, and they enjoyed a mutual respect as intellectual equals. In November 1792, Washington confided in Powel that he intended to step down at the end of his first term as president. In her own words, her "mind was thrown into a train of reflections", and she considered it "inconsistent with [their] friendship" to withhold her thoughts. To urge Washington to reconsider, she wrote a long letter using both her own words, and borrowed passages from The Secret History of the Court of Berlin, a political treatise written by the French nobleman Honoré Gabriel Riqueti, comte de Mirabeau. Her letter reads in part:

The Antifederalist would use [retirement] as an argument for dissolving the Union, and would urge that you, from experience, had found the present system a bad one, and had, artfully, withdrawn from it that you might not be crushed under its ruins ... For God's sake do not yield that empire to a love of ease, retirement, rural pursuits, or a false diffidence of abilities ...

After minor grammatical edits from her husband, Powel sent the letter on November 17, 1792, and Washington was reelected a month after. Although he did not reply, it seems that he was not offended by the strongly worded letter which he kept in his collection. According to Washington biographer Ron Chernow, her letter may have been the "decisive stroke" in convincing Washington to seek a second term. Their friendship continued unaffected, and he commissioned a poem by Elizabeth Graeme Fergusson as a gift to Powel for her 50th birthday a few months later.

They corresponded regularly throughout the 1780s and 1790s. Washington signed his letters "With the greatest respect and affection". Powel referred to him as "My dear Sir" and signed "Your sincere affectionate friend." Their relationship lasted until his death in 1799. It was within custom for prominent men of the period to befriend women, and they also included both Samuel and Martha in their friendship. (Note: Elizabeth reciprocated this custom, at one point, refusing for a time to respond to letters from Bushrod Washington citing "an established rule of never writing to a gentleman that does not correspond with Mr. Powel.") (Note: George was similarly friendly towards Samuel and took part in his avocation of creating silhouettes by posing for one.)

=== Later life and death ===
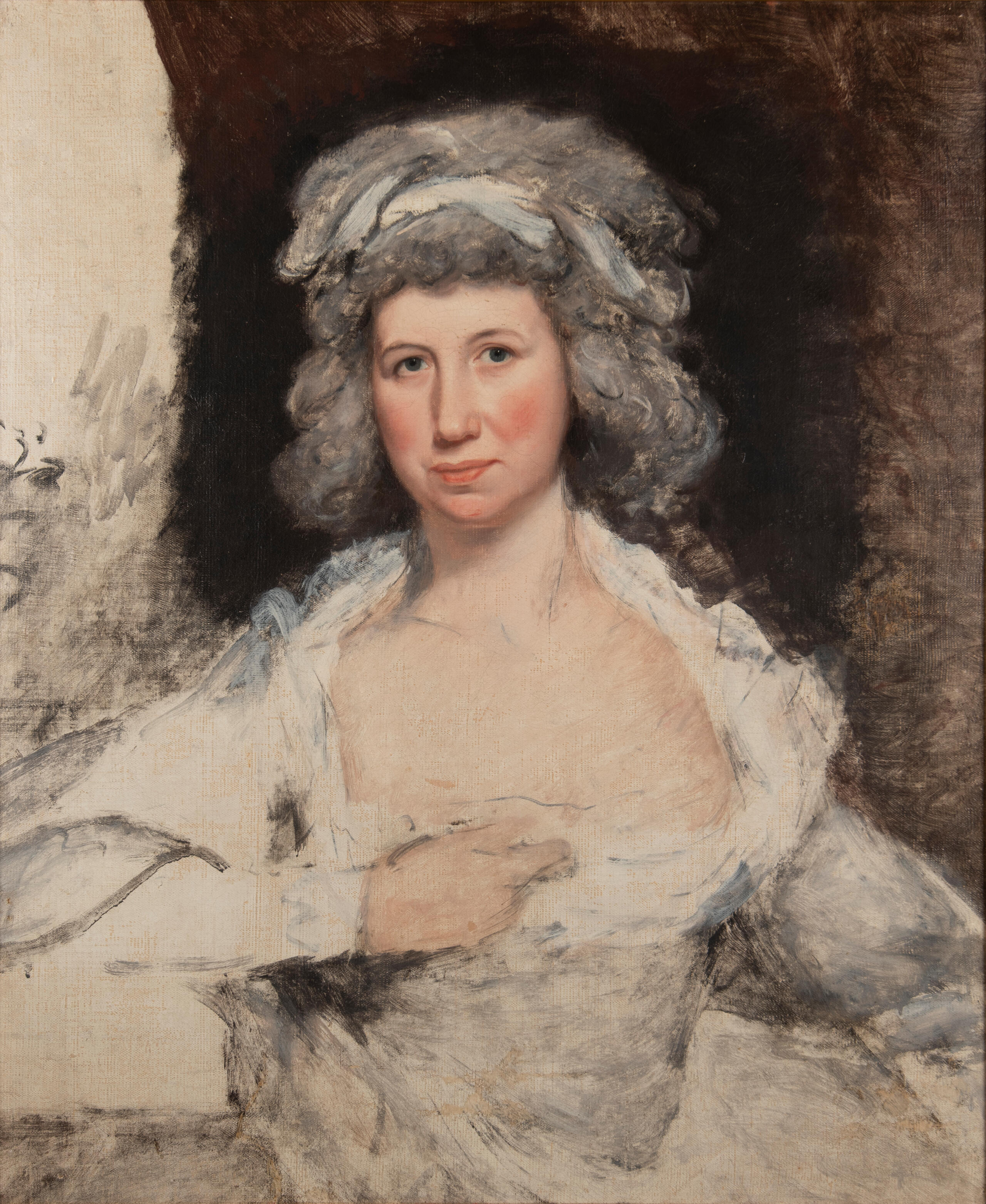
An unfinished portrait of Powel by Joseph Wright, c. 1793

Mayor Powel was reelected for a second term in 1789, becoming the first post-revolution mayor of Philadelphia. He was elected to the Pennsylvania State Senate the following year. In 1793, Philadelphia experienced an epidemic of yellow fever, during which the Washingtons invited the Powels to seek refuge at Mount Vernon. The family decided instead to remain in the city, where a tenth of the 50,000 residents contracted the disease and died including Samuel in September. Powel never remarried in the three decades after her husband's death. Following the death of George Washington in December 1799, she was among the first to write to his widow. Powel continued her correspondence with the Washington family, including George's nephew, Bushrod Washington, for whom she had purchased a gift of black satin robes upon his confirmation to the U.S. Supreme Court in April 1799.

Besides nominal gifts to some relatives and others, Samuel left all his wealth to Elizabeth and appointed her executrix of his will. She oversaw the management of the estate, a subject that was often discussed in her letters. Through her male relatives, she traded in bonds, stocks, and property. In 1798, she sold Powel House to William Bingham, the husband of her niece Ann Willing Bingham. Powel spent her final years in a mansion on Chestnut Street, a short distance from Independence Hall. In 1800, she began building a new house at Powelton, the country estate her late husband had purchased in 1775.

A month before her death, attendants at a dinner party reported she was in a state of "nervous irritability and mental distress," questioning "Have I ever done good in my life? Can people go to Heaven without doing good?" She died on January 17, 1830. Her funeral five days later was, according to Maxey, a well-attended "social event and a religious experience" presided over by William White, the bishop of Pennsylvania. Her obituary eulogized her as one who had "mind cast in an unusual mold of strength and proportion". She is buried beside her husband in the cemetery at Christ Church in Philadelphia. Her grave is inscribed: "Distinguished by her good sense and her good works."

At the suggestion of her sister Margaret and her husband Robert Hare, Powel had accepted their youngest son John Powel Hare—who subsequently changed his name to John Hare Powel—as her heir. He first came to her attention as an infant when he lived with the Powels in a failed attempt to avoid scarlet fever. He ended up contracting the disease, and it was Elizabeth who nursed him back to health. When he came of age, she paid his expenses for a tour of Europe and continued to show concern for his upbringing. After her death, John inherited most of Powel's estate including Powelton. The property in Blockley Township included a Greek Revival country home, built by Elizabeth in the early 1800s, which John expanded in 1824–25 with designs from architect William Strickland. He also inherited her mansion on Chestnut Street which he converted into a hotel named Marshall House and then leased to Samuel Badger who operated it from 1837 to 1841.

== Views ==
Powel maintained frequent correspondence with her influential interlocutors. She discussed politics and the education and social standing of women, exchanged poetry, recommended books, and reviewed scientific findings in medicine. She frequently studied and wrote on the subject of health, prompting Elizabeth Hamilton to later recall, "[r]emember Mrs. Powel on the advantages of health, and disadvantages of the want of it." When Rush published his Thoughts upon Female Education (1787), he dedicated the work to Powel.

=== Politics and war ===
Although Samuel was later known by the Colonial-revival appellation of "Patriot Mayor", his attitude towards the Revolutionary War was more measured. Elizabeth's sisters were active in the homespun movement and efforts to boycott British goods, but it does not seem that Elizabeth joined them. She did lament the lack of education the Revolutionary War would cause, citing "the want of proper schools for the instruction of youth ... especially when the barbarities of war have almost made mankind savage." According to Maxey, her later writing suggests she may have sided with the Patriots. When the War of 1812 broke out, her love for her country and strong hatred for the British became clear as she wrote:

Certainly the English are a proud, cruel sordid tyrannic selfish nation, as they have evinced by their brutal conduct in Asia, Africa, America, Ireland, Denmark, and in Scotland ... I cannot but suspect from the present conduct of the British, that they are fast returning to their pristine state of barbarity. Their execrable practice of pillaging, and burning, is only worthy of a nation of incendiaries, and thieves of the worst cast. Contrast what I have alledged as strictly true, with the real pretensions of the American Army, which is generally composed of the yeomanry of our country, respectable citizens, industrious well informed tradesmen who have families and property to protect, professional men of various descriptions, and some highminded generous gentlemen of independent fortune [who], although they are not designated by titular distinctions, have just claims to great personal nobility.

=== Role of women ===
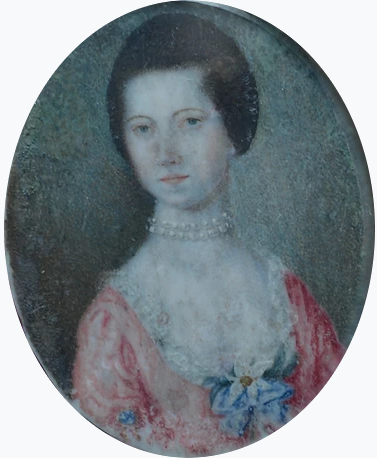
Miniature of Elizabeth Willing by an unknown artist, c. 1760

In her letters, Powel expressed contempt for Lord Chesterfield's Letters to His Son and his treatment of women. To her sister Mary, she wrote in December 1783 that Chesterfield "mistook appetite for love and regarded the object of his inclinations only as it could contribute to the gratification of his vicious desires." She warned of the dangers of taking pity on a seductive man that would lead a married woman to a precipice of "utter and inevitable disadvantage". In a circa 1784 letter to Maria Page, Mary's recently married daughter, Powel warned of the dangers of men who, from personal opinion and unchecked adherence to custom, "do not love to find a competitor" in their spouse. Powel believed such a marriage required the utmost delicacy and sacrifice from educated women in both private and public settings.

Despite her proximity to and friendships with the political and philosophical elites of the day, Powel expressed her misgivings about women holding public office. She wrote in a November 1785 letter:

A fine woman is totally unfit for government and what we commonly called the great affairs of public life. [Women] are quick at expedient, ready in the moment of sudden exigencies, excellent to suggest, but their imagination runs riot; it requires the vigor of mind alone possessed by men to digest and put in force a plan of any magnitude. There is a natural precipitancy in our sex that frequently frustrates its own designs.

However, although customary among salonnières and bluestockings to avoid politics as a subject, Powel did not restrain herself from expressing her opinions about the aptitude of the country's leaders and the direction of its progress.

As to corresponding with men by letter, Powel was concerned with following proper etiquette. When Bushrod Washington first wrote to her, she did not respond although they had already been friends and the young man was a regular visitor to her home for the prior two years. After his third letter, Powel finally wrote back to remind him that it was inappropriate for her to correspond with a man that does not write to her husband.

=== Religion ===
Bushrod Washington eventually became a protégé of Powel. She wrote to him on the subject of religion, saying at one time of David Hume and of deist philosophers generally, that they were like a person who would leave a family homeless by knocking down their house without providing shelter, arguing that the foundations of the home were not solid.

She was concerned with protecting the legacy of the Powel family name and ensuring it remained Protestant. When her heir, John Hare Powel, requested that she give to him a large portion of his expected inheritance so he may marry, Powel emphatically refused. John Hare's intended fiancée was likely Elizabeth Caton, granddaughter to Charles Carroll, and a Roman Catholic. Powel threatened to disinherit him because of this. She later wrote of the incident: "I most solemnly assured him that the estate of the modest virtuous Protestant Powel should not by any agency of mine be transmitted to any descendant of Charles Carroll of Carrollton".

=== Slavery and servitude ===
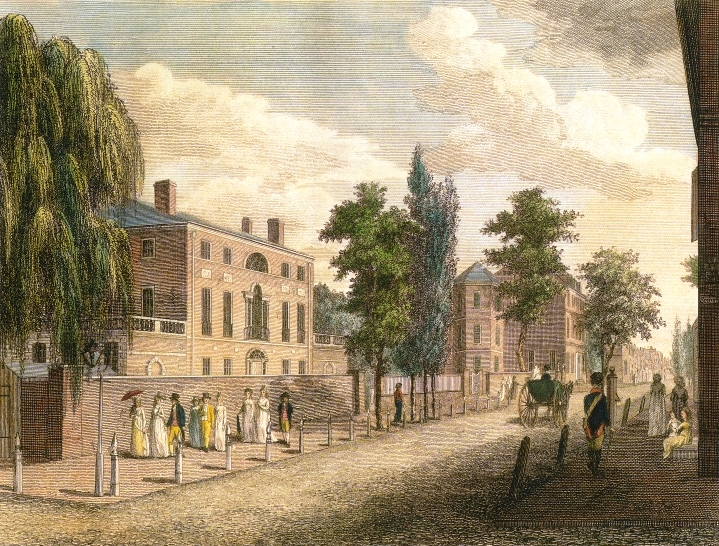
View in Third Street, from Spruce Street, Philadelphia (1799) by William Birch, with Powel House pictured right of center

The Powels initially maintained a substantial cadre of slaves as well as free and indentured servants. Christ Church records indicate the marriage of a slave of "Mr. Powel" less than a year after the Powels' wedding in 1769. Their purchase of a slave in October 1773 for the price of £100 (Note: Equivalent to £13,000 in 2025.) is also noted in local tax records. By 1790, the family no longer held slaves in their service, although their peers and neighbors continued to do so. According to existing records, the Powels took considerable care regarding their servants' welfare, including Elizabeth allowing for a number of them in her will once she became a widow. (Note: Though Maxey cautions this should not be interpreted as a so-called class of happy slaves, somehow more well-off than their free counterparts, as histories of the time may have reported.) In one instance, she caused a dispute with the family of Alexander Wilcocks, by luring away their cook, Betty Smith, who was unhappy with the treatment of her employers. Powel concluded that Smith was ultimately a free woman and could make such decisions for herself.

Although she was born and married into slave-owning families, Powel later strongly opposed the institution. Upon her death in 1830, she left a 20-year annuity of $100 (Note: Equivalent to $3,020 in 2025.) to the Pennsylvania Abolition Society, along with a message to be included in their minutes, reading in part:

I abhor slavery under any modification and consider the practice of holding our fellow creatures in bondage alike inconsistent with the principles of humanity and the free republic institutions ... I feel it to be the duty of every individual to cooperate by all honourable means in the abolition of slavery, and in the restoration of freedom to that important part of the family of mankind, which has so long groaned under oppression.

Her opposition to slavery can be traced to at least 1814 when she began contemplating the bequest to the Abolition Society. She confided in her lawyer her hope that the end of slavery would be realized before the expiration of her bequest.

== "A republic ... if you can keep it" ==
In September 1787, during the final days of the Constitutional Convention, the delegates set to drafting the Constitution of the United States. Powel is said to have shared an exchange with Benjamin Franklin, for which she is most often remembered. According to James McHenry, a delegate of the Convention, she asked Franklin, "What have we got, a republic or a monarchy?" referring to the governmental structure of the newly formed United States. Franklin is said to have responded, "A republic ... if you can keep it."

=== James McHenry's accounts ===
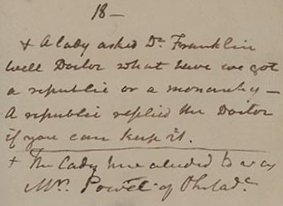
James McHenry's journal entry dated September 18, 1787

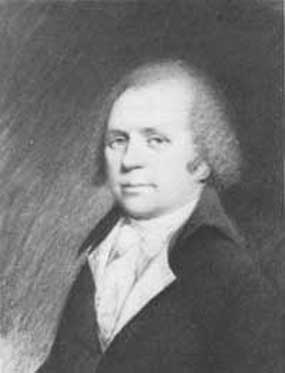
McHenry in a portrait attributed to James Sharples, c. 1795–1800

The first account of the story was recorded by McHenry on the last page of his journal about the Convention. The entry, dated September 18, 1787, reads: "A lady asked Dr. Franklin well Doctor what have we got a republic or a monarchy – A republic replied the Doctor if you can keep it." He later added on the same page: "The lady here alluded to was Mrs. Powel of Philad[elphi]a." On July 15, 1803, McHenry published an extended version of the conversation in The Republican, or Anti-Democrat, a short-lived anti-Jeffersonian newspaper in Baltimore:

Powel: Well, Doctor, what have we got? (Note: In his earlier journal entry, this question was posed as "... what have we got a republic or a monarchy?")
Franklin: A republic, Madam, if you can keep it. (Note: McHenry's earlier journal entry did not include "Madam".)
Powel: And why not keep it?
Franklin: Because the people, on tasting the dish, are always disposed to eat more of it than does them good.

The following month, the anecdote was reprinted in several Federalist newspapers, including the Middlebury Mercury in Vermont, The Spectator in New York, the Alexandria Advertiser in Virginia, and the Newburyport Herald in Massachusetts. Historian J. L. Bell believes that McHenry, a staunch Federalist, may have had political motivations for changing the story. While the original version was whether the U.S. was a monarchy or a republic, McHenry recalls in his later versions a second question from Powel implying that the first question was whether the country was to be a republic or a democracy. He again included the anecdote in his 1811 political pamphlet The Three Patriots, an attack on Thomas Jefferson, James Madison, and James Monroe. In this pamphlet, he notes that the conversation took place as Franklin was just entering the room to meet Powel, presumably at her home.

Writing in 1814, Powel could not recall, but would not deny, that the interaction had taken place:

I have no recollection of any such conversations ... Yet I cannot venture to deny after so many years have elapsed that such conversations had passed. I well remember to have frequently associated with the most respectable, influential members of the Convention that framed the Constitution, and that the all-important subject was frequently discussed at our house.

Powel remembered an account of the conversation also appearing in Zachariah Poulson's Daily Advertiser, but she could not recall on what date. Bell notes that he did not locate the story in the Daily Advertiser, and it did appear elsewhere, so Powel may have misremembered where else, besides McHenry's writings, she had seen it.

=== Adaptation and Powel's diminishing role ===
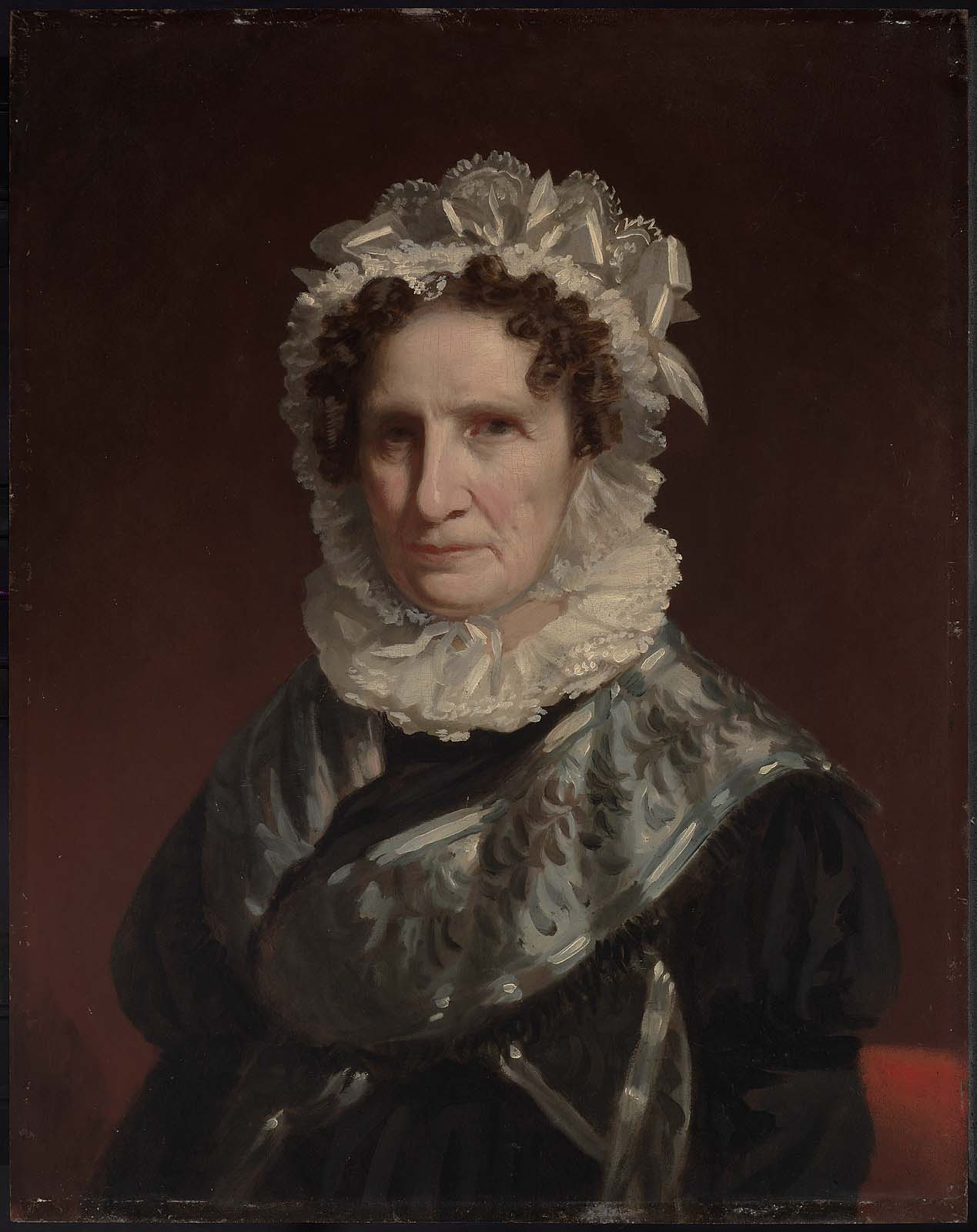
Madam Powel by Francis Alexander, c. 1825

McHenry's journal on the Constitutional Convention first appeared in print, in its entirety including the footnote mentioning Powel, in the April 1906 issue of The American Historical Review. It is to this publication that Bartleby.com and The Yale Book of Quotations trace the anecdote's recent history. The anecdote appears again in The Records of the Federal Convention of 1787 by Max Farrand which was published in 1911. (Note: McHenry's original entry is dated September 18, 1787, but Max Farrand's 1911 compendium, The Records of the Federal Convention of 1787, has a footnote stating the "date of this is uncertain".)

The story of Powel's exchange with Franklin was adapted over time. While Franklin's response continued to be attributed to him, the role played by Powel was all but removed in 20th-century versions. The setting of the exchange was revised from Powel's home to the steps of Independence Hall or the streets of Philadelphia. Powel herself was often replaced with an anonymous "lady", "woman", or "concerned citizen". Hilmar Baukhage, in his remarks at a 1940 alumni symposium at the University of Chicago, attributes the question to a woman who stuck her head out of a window as the delegates were coming out on to the streets of Philadelphia. The question is also mentioned in speeches at both the 1940 and 1968 Republican National Conventions in which it is attributed to a "woman" and a "concerned citizen", respectively. Michael P. Riccards wrote in his 1987 book, A Republic, If You Can Keep it, that "as [Franklin] shuffled down the streets of Philadelphia, an inquisitive woman stopped him and asked, 'What have you given us?' "

Where Powel is included in biographer Walter Isaacson's 2003 book, Benjamin Franklin: An American Life, she was portrayed not as a prominent figure of importance and intelligence but as an "anxious lady" who "accosted" Franklin. Isaacson writes that Powel asked "what type of government have you given us?" According to historian Zara Anishanslin, this also diminishes her role by relaying her question in the passive form. Associate Justice Neil Gorsuch's book, A Republic, If You Can Keep It, published in September 2019, did not mention Powel and instead attributes the question to a "passerby" who posed it to Franklin as he exited the Constitutional Convention. The same month, Speaker Nancy Pelosi, while announcing the impeachment inquiry against Donald Trump in the House of Representatives, attributed the question to "Americans gathered on the steps of Independence Hall". While noting that Pelosi also does not mention Powel, Anishanslin argues that Powel's "erasure not only creates a founding-era political history artificially devoid of women, but it also makes it harder to imagine contemporary women ... as political leaders".

== Powel House, papers, and portraits ==
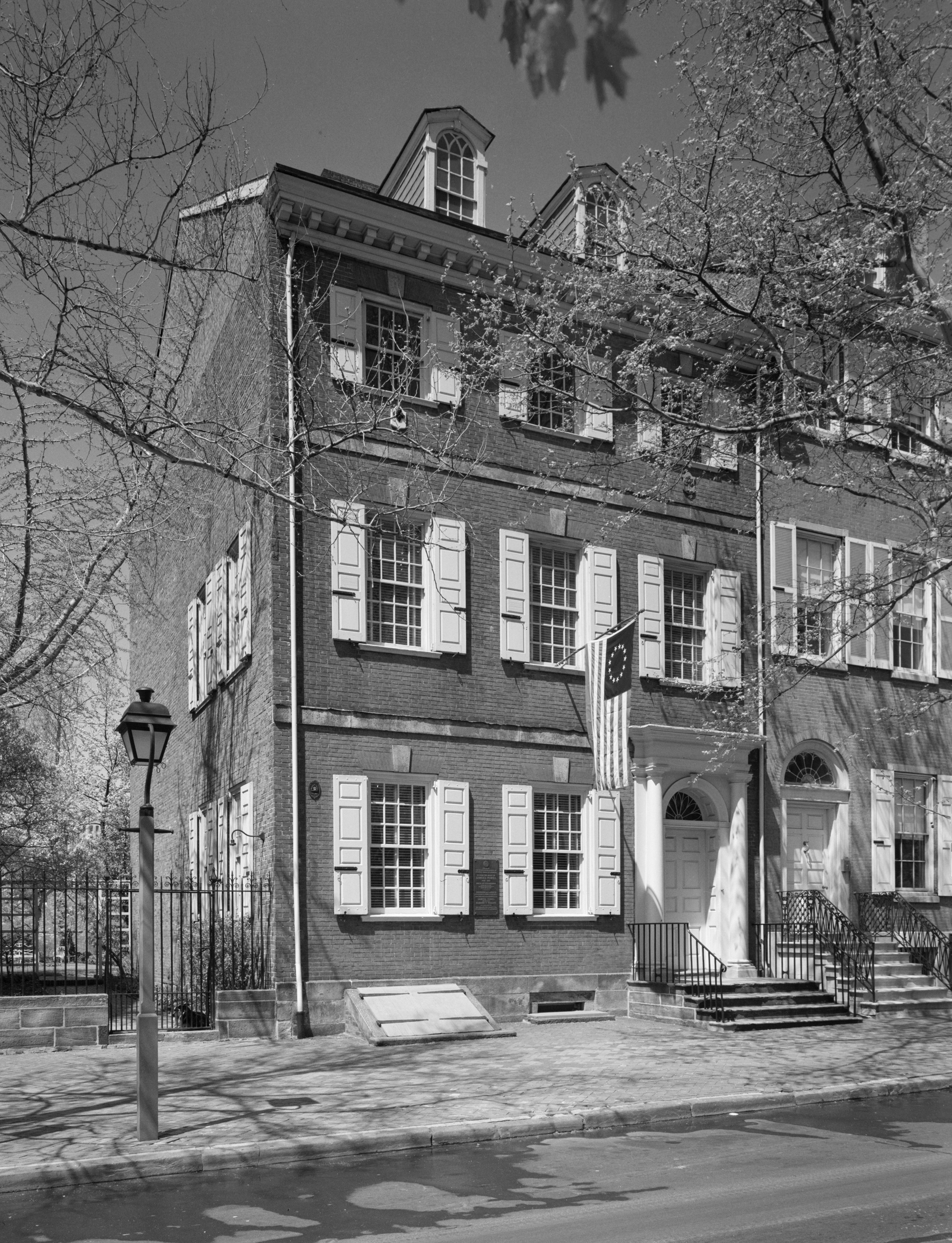
Powel House, photograph by Cortlandt V. D. Hubbard, Historic American Buildings Survey, c. 1960s

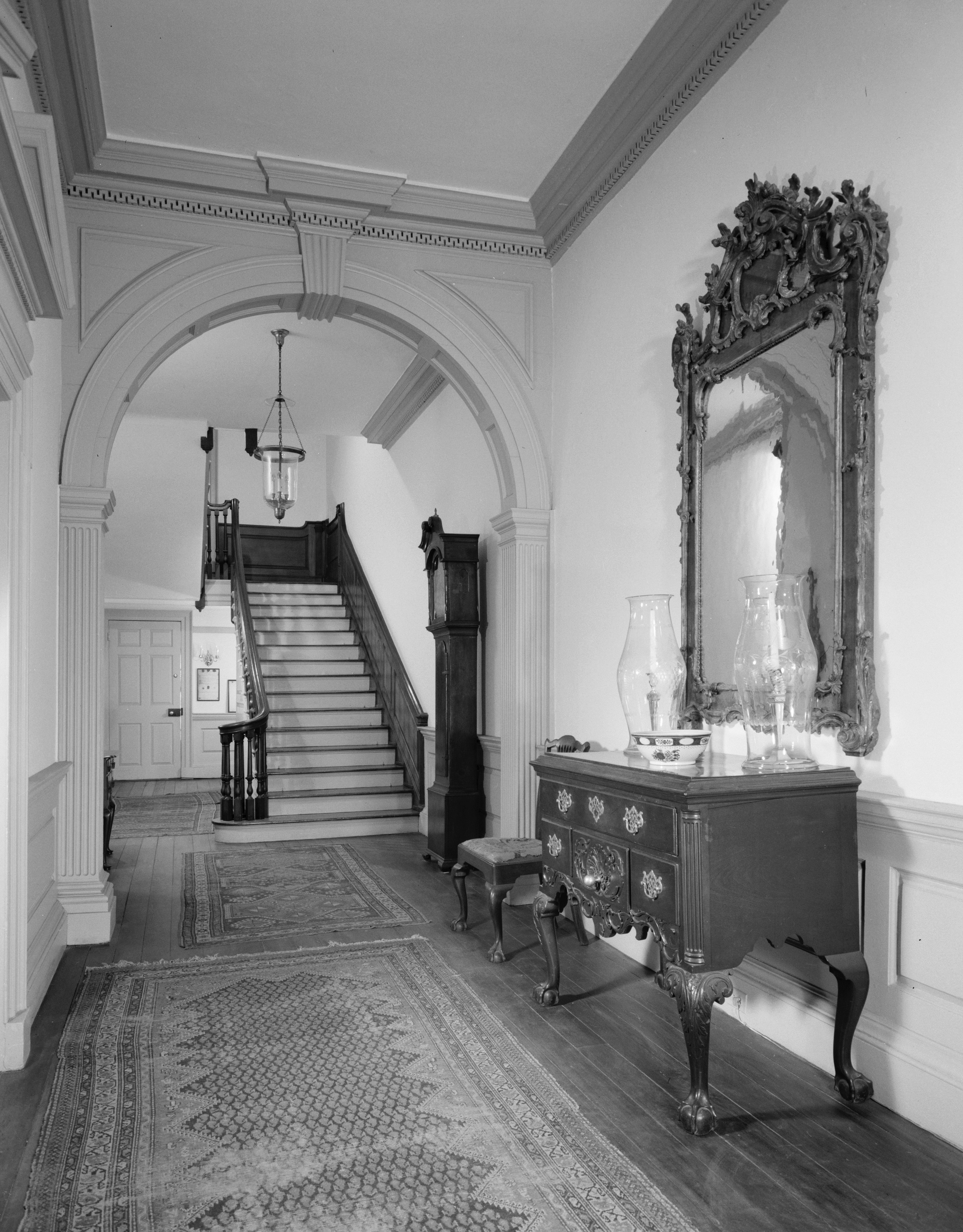
Front hallway and stairs, photograph by Hubbard, Historic American Buildings Survey, 1962

In 1925, the Philadelphia Museum of Art acquired the interior decoration of the Powel House, including the woodwork. The front parlor on the second-floor was reconstructed as an exhibit. The house at 244 South Third Street was purchased in 1931 by the Philadelphia Society for the Preservation of Landmarks. In 1934, the Philadelphia Museum of Art returned the majority of the interior elements purchased from the house. This included the entry archway, a wall with a fireplace from the first-story back parlor, and molding from throughout the house. Copies were made of the woodwork from the second-floor front parlor and from the adjacent withdrawing room. With the reappropriated elements, the Powel House was fully restored and furnished with pieces from the 18th century. It was opened to the public as a museum in 1938. The second-floor front parlor remains as an exhibit at Philadelphia Museum of Art, and the withdrawing room is at the Metropolitan Museum of Art in New York.

Powel meticulously copied her letters to relatives and friends; each was signed "Eliza Powel". Nearly 500 of her letters survive. In late 2016 or early 2017, a descendant of John Hare found a previously undiscovered cache of documents belonging to Powel in a false bottom trunk. The collection of about 256 pages, consisting mostly of financial records and inventories in her handwriting, was gifted to the Philadelphia Society for the Preservation of Landmarks.

Several portraits of Powel survive. The earliest are a circa 1755–1759 portrait by John Wollaston and a circa 1760 miniature by an unknown artist. The first of two portraits by painter Matthew Pratt, Portrait of Mrs. Samuel Powel (née Elizabeth Willing), is from around the time of her marriage to Samuel in 1769. It is owned by the Philadelphia Museum of Art. Before his death during the Philadelphia yellow fever epidemic in 1793, the painter Joseph Wright started a portrait of Powel that went unfinished. Wright's painting was anonymously donated around 2020 and is held by the Mount Vernon Ladies' Association.

The second portrait by Pratt, Mrs. Samuel Powel, was created soon after her husband's death in the same epidemic. Maxey dedicates a significant portion of his 2006 essay, A Portrait of Elizabeth Willing Powel (1743–1830), to the task of ascertaining the date, meaning, and provenance of the latter Pratt portrait. The essay concludes that the painting portrays her in a revealing invented yellow dress as a bereaved mother in the 1780s, rather than a grieving widow at the age of 50 as the date of its commissioning would suggest. When it was acquired by the Pennsylvania Academy of the Fine Arts in 1912, the portrait was believed to be the work of John Singleton Copley, a claim that was refuted by Charles Henry Hart in 1915.

Powel received frequent requests for portraitures by a number of artists, directly or through friends and relatives, many of which she declined. In 1809, Benjamin Trott created a miniature which Powel commended for its "great taste" though she said it was "a too flattering likeness to be a perfectly correct one". Eight years later, Thomas Sully based a bust portrait on the miniature by Trott. Powel sat for her final portrait at the age of 81 or 82, circa 1825, for a painting by a young Francis Alexander. This last portrait is owned by the Museum of Fine Arts in Boston.

== See also ==
- History of Philadelphia
- Women in the American Revolution

== Sources ==
- Anishanslin, Zara (2016). Portrait of a Woman in Silk: Hidden Histories of the British Atlantic World. Yale University Press. ISBN 978-0-300-23423-7. Archived from the original on October 17, 2020.
- Branson, Susan (2010). These Fiery Frenchified Dames: Women and Political Culture in Early National Philadelphia. University of Pennsylvania Press. ISBN 978-0-8122-0141-3.
- Chernow, Ron (2011). Washington: A Life. Penguin. ISBN 978-0-14-311996-8. Archived from the original on October 17, 2020.
- Clark, Edward L., ed. (1864). A Record of the Inscriptions on the Tablets and Grave-Stones in the Burial-Grounds of Christ Church, Philadelphia. Christ Church, Philadelphia. Collins (printer). OCLC 782961. Archived from the original on October 17, 2020.
- De Chastellux, François-Jean (1963) [1786]. Travels in North America, in the Years 1780, 1781, and 1782. Translated by Rice, Howard C. Jr. Institute of Early American History and Culture at Williamsburg. University of North Carolina Press. OCLC 1151465106. Archived from the original on October 17, 2020.
- Farrand, Max, ed. (1911). "James McHenry: Anecdotes" . The Records of the Federal Convention of 1787. Vol. 3. Yale University Press. p. 85 – via Wikisource.
- Fraser, Flora (2015). The Washingtons: George and Martha, "Join'd by Friendship, Crown'd by Love". Knopf Doubleday Publishing Group. ISBN 978-0-307-47443-8. Archived from the original on October 17, 2020.
- Furstenberg, François (2015). When the United States Spoke French: Five Refugees Who Shaped a Nation. Penguin. ISBN 978-0-14-312745-1. Archived from the original on October 17, 2020.
- Gallery, John Andrew (2016). Philadelphia Architecture: A Guide to the City. Paul Dry Books. ISBN 978-1-5898811-0-5.
- Good, Cassandra A. (2015). Founding Friendships: Friendships Between Men and Women in the Early American Republic. Oxford University Press. ISBN 978-0-19-937617-9. Archived from the original on October 17, 2020.
- Gorsuch, Neil (2019). A Republic, If You Can Keep It. Crown Publishing Group. ISBN 978-0-525-57679-2. Archived from the original on October 17, 2020.
- Hawkins, Bryan Keven (1988). Grecian Splendor: The City Mansion of John Hare Powel (Master's thesis). University of Pennsylvania.
- Isaacson, Walter (2003). Benjamin Franklin: An American Life. Simon and Schuster. ISBN 978-0-7432-6084-8. Archived from the original on October 17, 2020.
- Jesse, John Heneage (1901). Memoirs of George Selwyn and His Contemporaries. John C. Nimmo. ISBN 978-0-554-44157-3. Archived from the original on October 17, 2020.
- Johnson, Robert Winder (1905). The Ancestry of Rosalie Morris Johnson: Daughter of George Calvert Morris and Elizabeth Kuhn, His Wife. Ferris & Leach. ISBN 978-0-598-99967-2. Archived from the original on October 17, 2020.
- Jordan, John W. (2004) [Originally composed in 1911]. Colonial and Revolutionary Families of Pennsylvania. Genealogical Publishing. ISBN 978-0-8063-5239-8. Archived from the original on October 17, 2020.
- Kirtley, Alexandra Alevizatos (June 2012). "Front Parlor from the Powel House, Philadelphia, 1769–70". Winterthur Portfolio. 46 (2/3): E12–E23. doi:10.1086/668632. JSTOR 10.1086/668632. S2CID 162809704.
- Konkle, Burton Alva (November 11, 2016). Thomas Willing and the First American Financial System. University of Pennsylvania Press. ISBN 978-1-5128-0343-3.
- Kopaczewski, James (August 2017). "A Self-Guided Tour: Elizabeth Willing Powel" (PDF). Temple.edu. Temple University. Archived (PDF) from the original on March 8, 2018.
- Maxey, David W. (2006). "A Portrait of Elizabeth Willing Powel (1743–1830)". Transactions of the American Philosophical Society. 96 (4): i–91. doi:10.2307/20020407. JSTOR 20020407.
- Martin, John Hill (1883). Martin's Bench and Bar of Philadelphia. R. Welsh & Company. OCLC 1097479950. Archived from the original on October 17, 2020.
- McHenry, James (1811). The Three Patriots, or, the Cause and Cure of Present Evils: Addressed to the Voters of Maryland. Printed for the author by B. Edes.
- McHenry, James (1906). "Papers of Dr. James McHenry on the Federal Convention of 1787". The American Historical Review. 11 (3): 595–624. doi:10.2307/1836024. ISSN 0002-8762. JSTOR 1836024.
- Mercur, Mary Ward (1942). "Elizabeth Willing Powel 1742–1830". In Biddle, Gertrude Bolster; Dickenson Lowrie, Sarah (eds.). Notable Women of Pennsylvania. University of Pennsylvania Press. ISBN 978-1-5128-1032-5. JSTOR j.ctv4v336k.
- Metaxas, Eric (2017). If You Can Keep It: The Forgotten Promise of American Liberty. Penguin. ISBN 978-1-101-97999-0. Archived from the original on October 17, 2020.
- Riccards, Michael P. (1987). A Republic, If You Can Keep it: The Foundation of the American Presidency, 1700–1800. Michael Riccards. ISBN 978-0-313-25462-8. Archived from the original on October 17, 2020.
- Shields, David S.; Teute, Fredrika J. (April 29, 2015). "The Republican Court and the Historiography of a Women's Domain in the Public Sphere". Journal of the Early Republic. 35 (2): 169–183. doi:10.1353/jer.2015.0033. ISSN 1553-0620. S2CID 144440598. Archived from the original on July 20, 2020 – via Project MUSE.
- Simpson, Henry (1859). "Colonel John Hare Powel". The Lives of Eminent Philadelphians, Now Deceased. W. Brotherhead. ISBN 978-0-608-40097-6. OCLC 1240769. Archived from the original on October 17, 2020.
- Tatum, George (1976). Philadelphia Georgian: The City House of Samuel Powel and Some of its Eighteenth-Century Neighbors. Wesleyan University Press. ISBN 978-0-8195-4095-9. OCLC 1975107.
- Templier, Sarah (August 2013). Under the Roof and the Pen of Elizabeth Willing Powel: Material Culture, Sociability, and Letters in Revolutionary and Early Republican Philadelphia (Master's thesis). University of Montreal. Archived from the original on February 4, 2020.
- Watson, Robert P. (September 6, 2012). Affairs of State: The Untold History of Presidential Love, Sex, and Scandal, 1789–1900. Rowman & Littlefield Publishers. ISBN 978-1-4422-1836-9. Archived from the original on October 17, 2020.
- Wood, Charles B. (April 1967). "Powelton: An Unrecorded Building by William Strickland". Pennsylvania Magazine of History and Biography. 91 (2): 145–163. JSTOR 20090030.
