= Samuel Powel =

American politician (1738–1793)

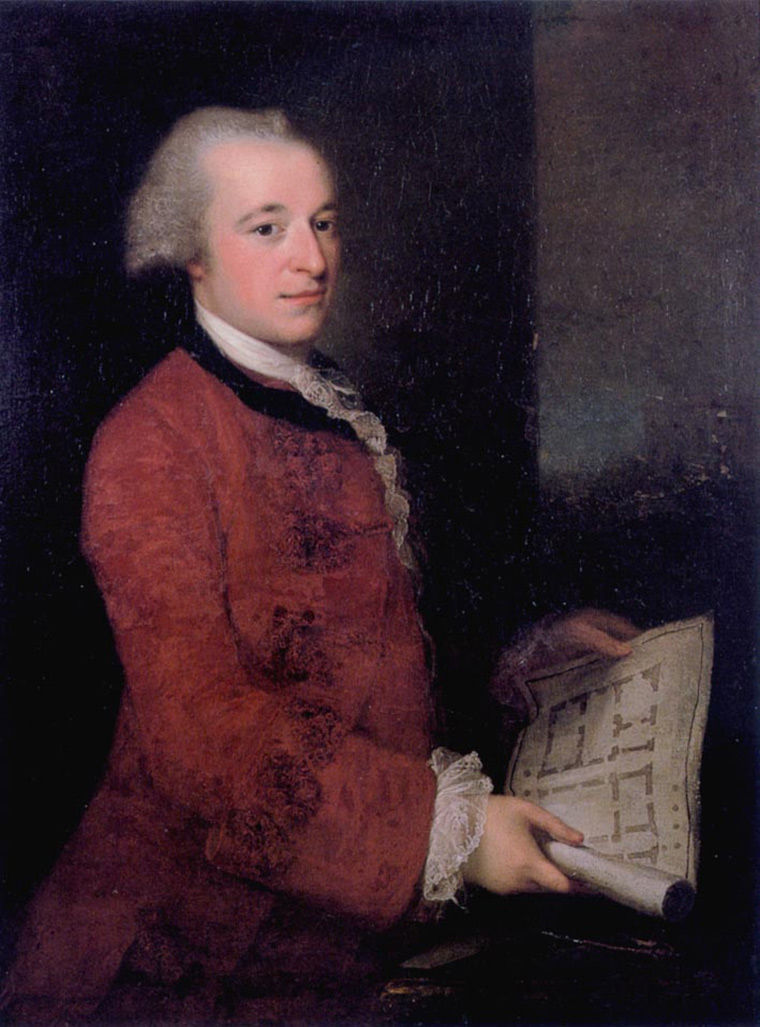
- Portrait of Powel, c. 1764-1765
- Born: October 28, 1738; Philadelphia, Province of Pennsylvania, British America
- Died: September 29, 1793 (aged 54); Philadelphia, Pennsylvania, U.S.
- Resting place: Christ Church Burial Ground, Philadelphia, Pennsylvania
- Spouse: Elizabeth Willing Powel (m. 1769)

Coat of Arms of Samuel Powel

Samuel Powel (October 28, 1738 – September 29, 1793) was a colonial and post-revolutionary mayor of Philadelphia, Pennsylvania. Since Philadelphia's mayoral office had been abolished early in the revolutionary period, Powel was the last colonial mayor of the city and the first to serve after the United States gained independence from Great Britain.

== Early life and education ==
Powell was born in Philadelphia, in the Province of Pennsylvania, British America, on October 28, 1738, the son of Samuel Powel and Mary Morris. On August 7, 1769, he married Elizabeth Willing, the daughter of Philadelphia mayor Charles Willing and Ann Shippen, and a sister of Philadelphia mayor and Continental Congressman Thomas Willing, a business partner of Robert Morris.

In 1759, he graduated from the College of Philadelphia, later renamed the University of Pennsylvania. After graduation, Powel made a six-year tour of Europe with his friend John Morgan. They spent much of their time studying art treasures. This customary grand tour served as an educational rite of passage. A regular feature of aristocratic education, it served as a means of gaining both exposure and association with the sophistication of Europe.

== Career ==
He served as mayor from 1775 to 1776 and then again from 1789 to 1790. After 1790, the office was abolished under the Pennsylvania Constitution of 1776. He was a member of the Pennsylvania State Senate from 1790 to his death in 1793.

Powel was an early member of the American Philosophical Society and a trustee of the College of Philadelphia (now the University of Pennsylvania).

== Powel House ==
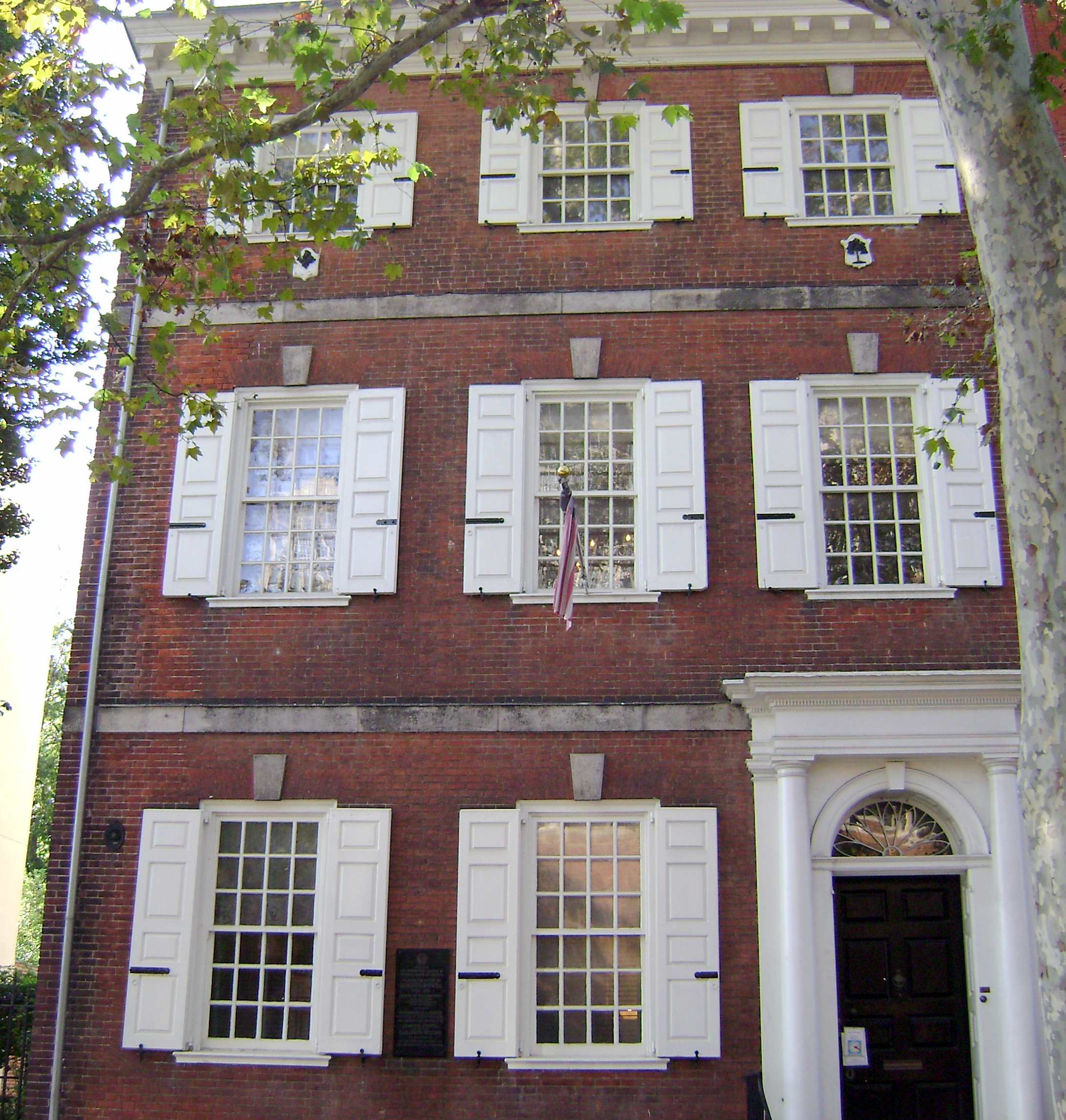
Powel House at 244 S. 3rd Street in Philadelphia

Samuel Powel's house, at 244 South 3rd Street, is a house museum run by the Philadelphia Society for the Preservation of Landmarks. A Georgian city house built by Charles Stedman in 1765, Powel expanded and embellished it around 1770, with carved woodwork and ornate plaster ceilings.

The Powels were friends with George and Martha Washington, and lived next door to them from November 1781 to March 1782, following the Battle of Yorktown. At the end of Washington's presidency, Powel's wife purchased some of the furniture from the President's House in Philadelphia.

The rear parlor was removed from the house in 1921, and is now at the Metropolitan Museum of Art. The ballroom was removed from the house in 1925, and is now at the Philadelphia Museum of Art. Both rooms have been replicated at the house museum.

== Death ==
Powel died in the yellow fever epidemic of 1793 on September 29, 1793, in the bare little upper room of a tenant farmer on Powel's farm west of the city, now the site of the Powelton Village section of West Philadelphia. He is interred at Christ Church Burial Ground.

== Ancestry ==
Ancestors of Samuel Powel

John Powle (bur. 1618) (Note: Likely the grandson of Morgan Powell of Taunton.)
Godrey Powell(bap. 1599)
Elizabeth Savidge
Samuel Powell (bap. 1642)
Samuel Powell (1673–1756) (Note: Samuel Powell's birth in 1673 and his ancestry is uncertain according to Tatum (1976).)
Deborah Powle (bap. 1640)
Samuel Powel (1705–1747) (Note: Jordan (2004) erroneously states that this Samuel died in 1759. According to historian Tatum (1976), this often repeated error may have originated from Robert C. Moon, the genealogist to the Morris family.)
Barnabas Wilcox
Abigail Wilcox (1679–1713)
Sarah
Samuel Powel
Anthony Morris (c. 1630 – 1655 or 1656)
Anthony Morris (1654–1721)
Elizabeth Senior (died 1660)
Anthony Morris (1682–1763)
Mary Jones
Mary Morris (1713–1759)
John Guest
George Guest (died 1685)
Joane
Phoebe Guest (1685–1768)
William Bailyes
William Bailyes (bap. 1622)
Alice Sommerland
Alice Bailyes (died 1705)
Thomas Chanders
Alice (or Elizabeth) Chanders

== Sources ==
- Jordan, John W. (2004). Colonial and Revolutionary Families of Pennsylvania. Genealogical Publishing. pp. 110–113. ISBN 978-0-8063-5239-8.
- Maxey, David W. (2006). "A Portrait of Elizabeth Willing Powel (1743–1830)". Transactions of the American Philosophical Society. 96 (4): i–91. doi:10.2307/20020407. JSTOR 20020407.
- Tatum, George (1976). Philadelphia Georgian: The City House of Samuel Powel and Some of its Eighteenth-Century Neighbors. Wesleyan University Press. ISBN 978-0-8195-4095-9. OCLC 1975107.
- Johnson, Robert Winder (1905). The Ancestry of Rosalie Morris Johnson: Daughter of George Calvert Morris and Elizabeth Kuhn, His Wife. Ferris & Leach. ISBN 978-0-598-99967-2.

Political offices
Preceded by Samuel Rhoads	Mayor of Philadelphia; 1775–1776	Succeeded by vacant
Preceded by vacant	Mayor of Philadelphia; 1789–1790	Succeeded by Samuel Miles
