= Philip Syng Physick =

American physician (1768–1837)

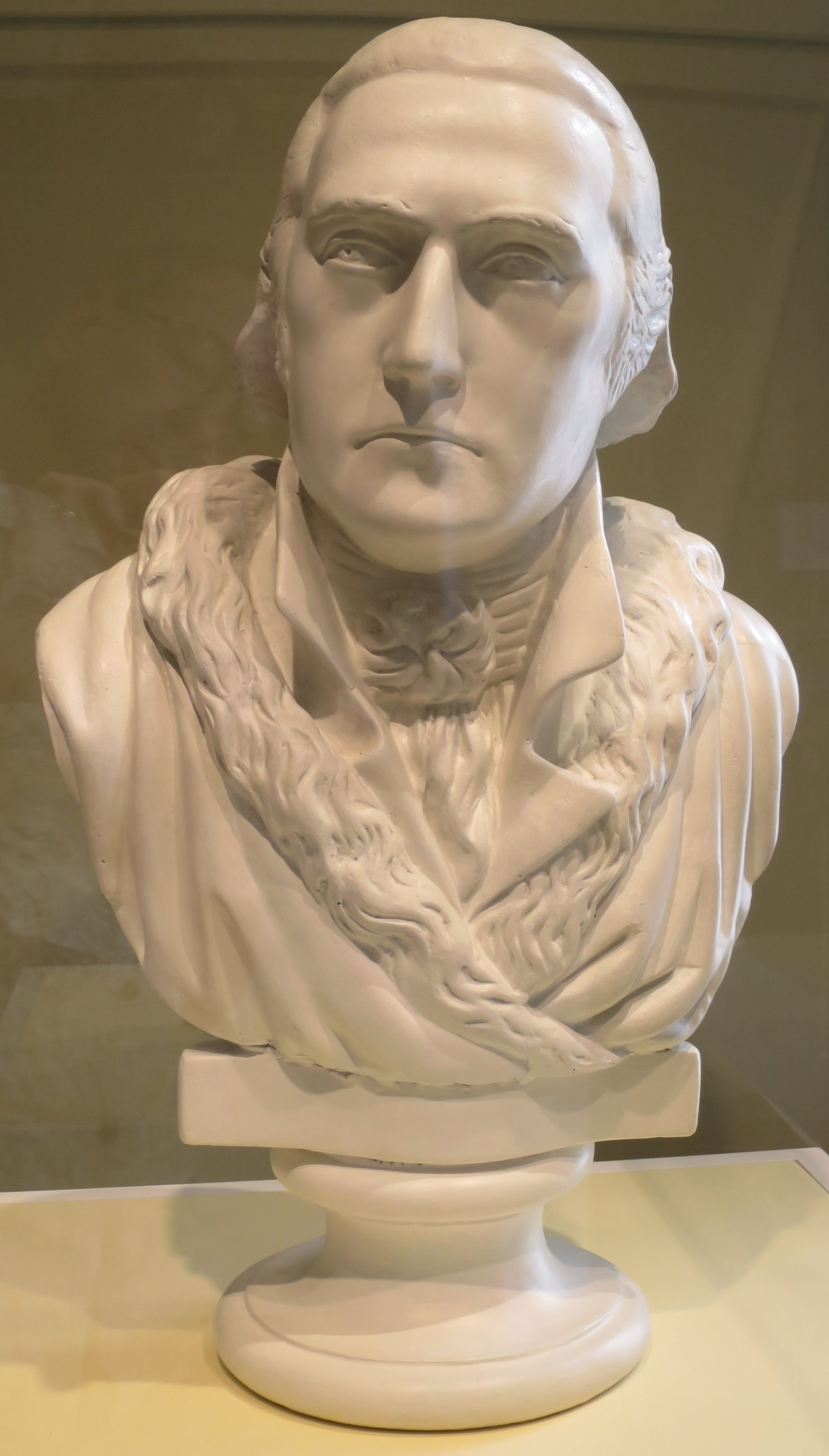
Bust of Physick by William Rush

Philip Syng Physick (July 7, 1768 – December 15, 1837) was an American medical doctor and professor born in Philadelphia. He was the first professor of surgery and later of anatomy at the University of Pennsylvania medical school from 1805 to 1831 during which time he was a highly influential teacher. Physick invented a number of surgical devices and techniques including the stomach tube and absorbable sutures. He has been called the "Father of American Surgery."

== Life and career ==
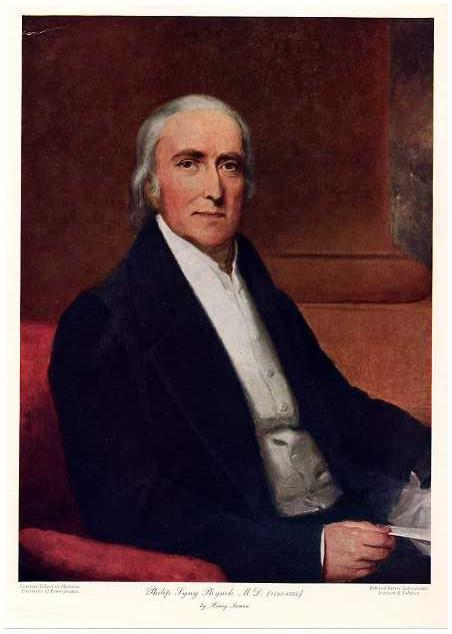
Portrait by Henry Inman, 1836

Physick was born in Philadelphia on July 7, 1768, to Edmund Physick and Abigail Syng. Edmund was a businessman and receiver general of Pennsylvania who was a close friend of the Penn family and Keeper of the Great Seal. Abigail's father, Philip Syng, was a silversmith.

Physick was educated at the Friend's Public School where he studied under Robert Stroud. He graduated from the University of Pennsylvania in 1785, then began the study of medicine under Adam Kuhn, and continued it in London under John Hunter, learning anatomy through cadaver dissections, becoming, on January 1, 1790, house surgeon of St. George's hospital. Physick's skill in dissection made him a favorite student of Hunter.

In 1791, he received his license from the Royal College of Surgeons in London, and was invited by Hunter to assist him in his professional practice, but after a few months went to the University of Edinburgh, where he received his degree in medicine in 1792.

He returned to Philadelphia to practice, taking a position at Pennsylvania Hospital. One of the foremost surgeons of the time, Physick was among the few doctors who remained in the city to care for the sick during Philadelphia's decimating Yellow Fever Epidemic of 1793. In 1795, Physick performed the first human blood transfusion, though he did not publish the information.

In 1802, Physick was elected a member of the American Philosophical Society, in Philadelphia.

Physick pioneered the use of the stomach pump, used autopsy as a regular means of observation and discovery, excelled in cataract surgery, and was responsible for the design of a number of surgical instruments, such as the needle forceps, the guillotine/snare for performing tonsillectomies, and improved splints and traction devices for treatment of dislocations; he also innovated many operative techniques.

Physick was the first in Western medicine to introduce cataract extraction by aspiration of lens material by applying suction to a tube in 1815.

Physick was also one of the most sought-after medical lecturers of the 19th century. His lectures prepared a generation of surgeons for service throughout America. It is because of his status as a teacher that he was dubbed the "Father of American Surgery".

His many patients included James Madison's wife, Dolley Madison, Chief Justice John Marshall (from whom he removed more than 1,000 kidney stones, effecting a complete cure), Benjamin Rush, and Judge John Faucheraud Grimké, father of the Grimké sisters. When President Andrew Jackson consulted with Physick about his lung hemorrhages, he was told to stop smoking.

Physick married Elizabeth daughter of Quaker preacher Samuel Emlen in 1800 and they had seven children before they separated in 1815. Physick pursued wealth and had an income of $20,000 a year (equivalent to $351,818 in 2025) and invested nearly all his surplus wealth in real estate, which at the time of his death was valued at half a million dollars (equivalent to $14,227,941 in 2025).

== Death and interment ==
Physick died in Philadelphia and was interred at Christ Church Burial Ground. His nephew John Syn Dorsey made use of Physick's case histories to publish Elements of Surgery (1813).

== See also ==
- Hill–Physick–Keith House
- Randolph House (Laurel Hill Mansion)
