= Hill–Physick–Keith House =

Historic house in Pennsylvania, United States

- U.S. National Register of Historic Places
- U.S. National Historic Landmark
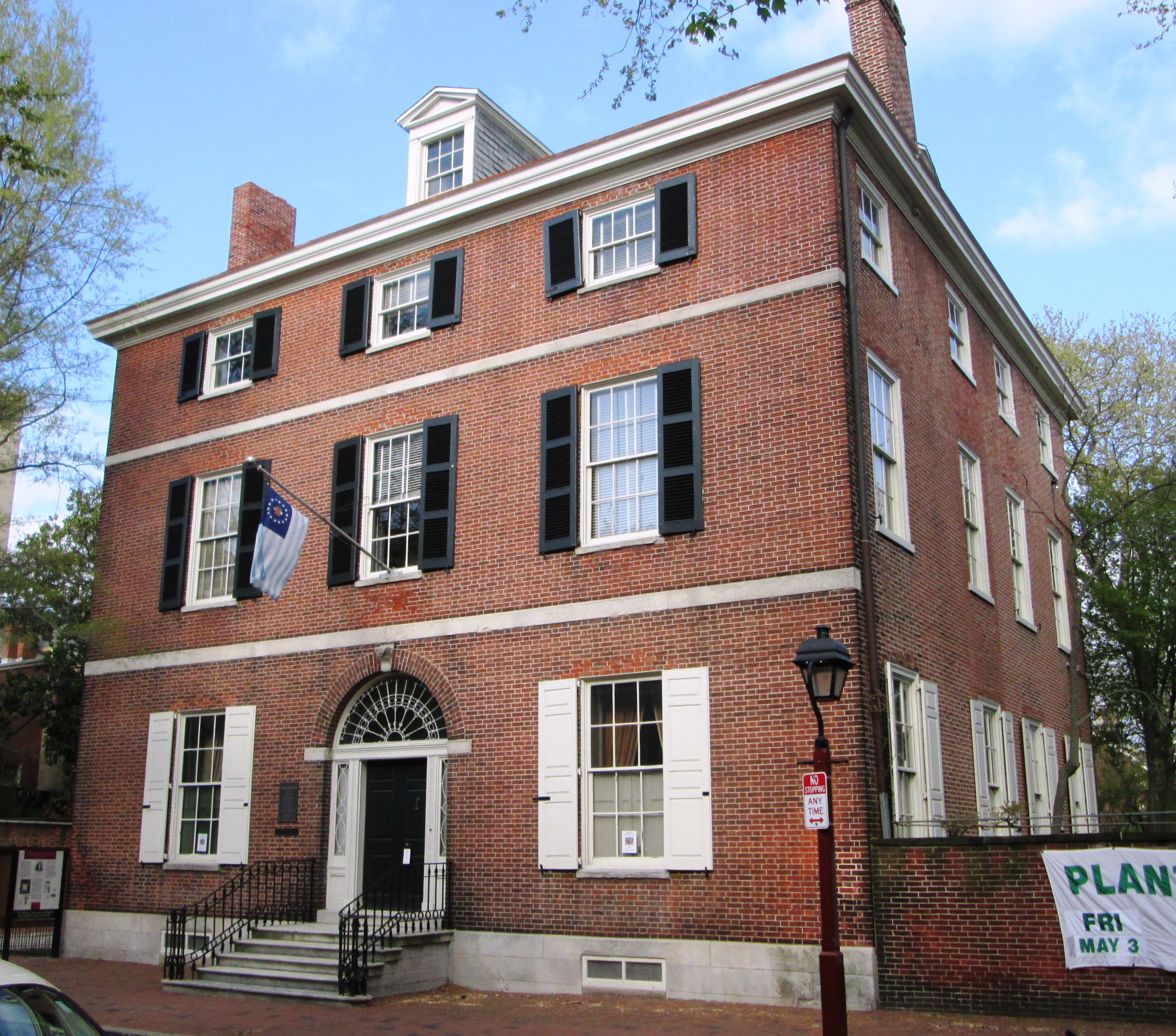
- (2013)

- Location within Philadelphia Location within Pennsylvania Location within the United States
- Location: 321 S. 4th Street; Philadelphia, Pennsylvania
- Coordinates: 39.9443°N 75.1484°W
- Built: 1786
- Architectural style: Federal
- NRHP reference No.: 71000726

Significant dates
- Added to NRHP: May 27, 1971
- Designated NHL: January 7, 1976

The Hill–Physick–Keith House, also known as the Hill–Keith–Physick House, the Hill–Physick House, or simply the Physick House, is a historic house museum located at 321 S. 4th Street in the Society Hill neighborhood of Philadelphia, Pennsylvania, USA. Built 1786, it was the home of Philip Syng Physick (1768–1837), who has been called "the father of American surgery". The house was declared a National Historic Landmark in 1976. It is now owned and operated by the Philadelphia Society for the Preservation of Landmarks as a house museum.

== Description and history ==
The Hill–Physick–Keith House stands in the southern part of Philadelphia's Center City, freestanding on a parcel bounded by Delancey, Cypress, and South 4th Streets. It is a three-story brick building with Federal styling. It is covered by a hip roof, and has a three-bay main facade whose levels are separated by stone stringcourses. The main entrance is in the center bay, flanked by sidelight windows and topped by a large half-round transom window. The interior is well appointed with original Federal period features, including numerous marble fireplace surrounds. It is decorated in with Federal and Empire style furnishings, including some that belonged to its most famous owner, Philip Syng Physick.

Physick, born in Philadelphia, was trained in London and Edinburgh in surgery, a skill which he brought back to his hometown. He taught surgery and anatomy at the University of Pennsylvania, training an entire generation of new surgeons in the arts he had learned. He was also known for his skills in the operating room, and for the innovative designs of surgical tools he developed.

The house was built in 1786 by wealthy Madeira wine importer Henry Hill. It was the residence of Dr. Physick after separating from his wife, Elizabeth Emlen Physick, in 1815, until his death in 1837. The house later fell into dilapidation. In the late 1960s, publisher Walter Annenberg restored the house and then donated it to the Philadelphia Society for the Preservation of Landmarks. Today the house is the only free-standing Federal mansion remaining in the colonial center of Philadelphia.

The house is now operated as a museum, with the garden replicating one of the early 19th century. It is open Thursdays through Saturdays, 11am to 4pm, and Sundays, 12pm to 4pm. The building also serves as the headquarters of the State Society of the Cincinnati of Pennsylvania.

== See also ==
- List of National Historic Landmarks in Philadelphia
- National Register of Historic Places listings in Center City, Philadelphia
