= Powel House =

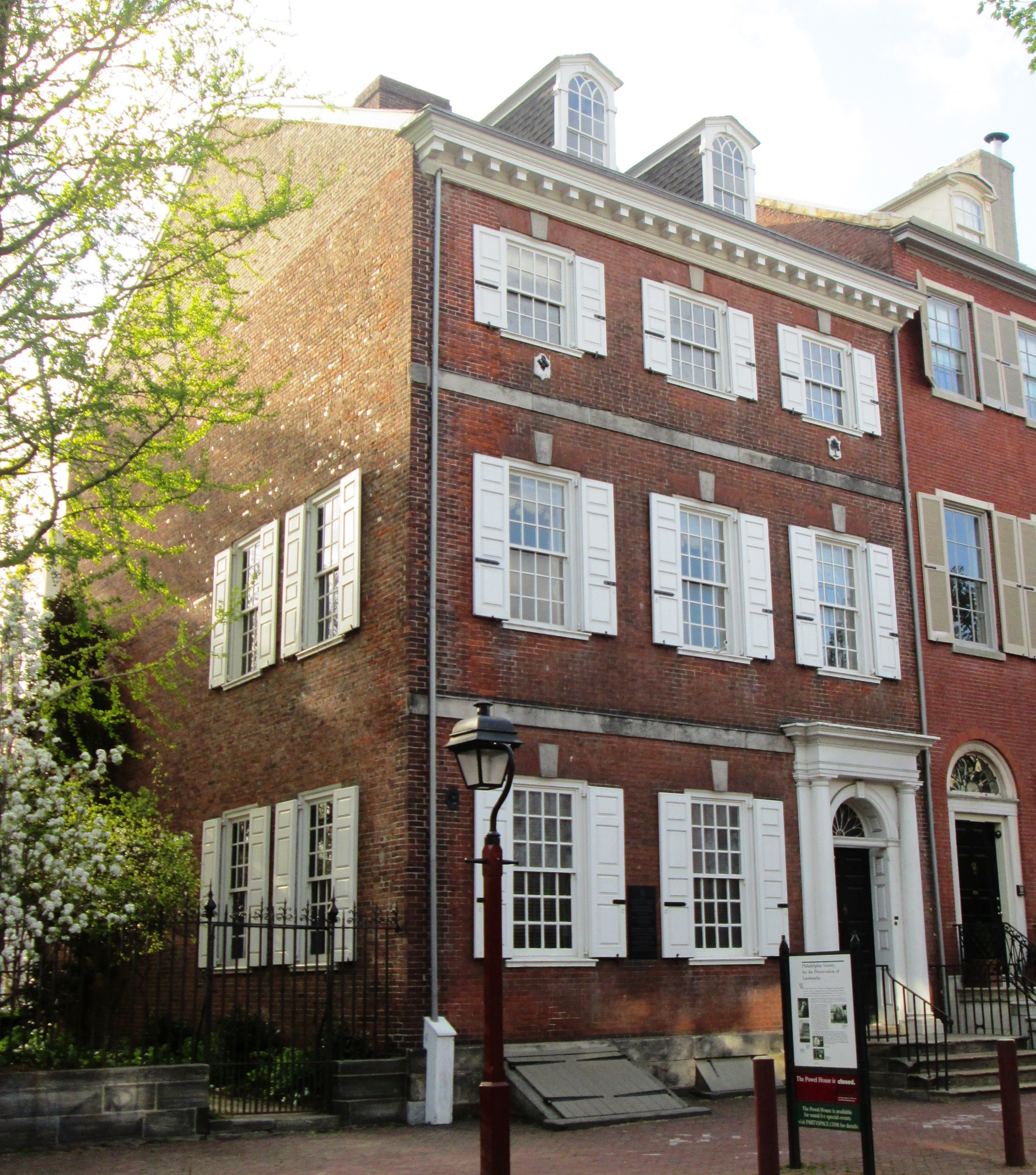
- (2013)
- Location: 244 S. Third St. Philadelphia, Pennsylvania
- Coordinates: 39.94576°N 75.1468°W
- Type: house museum
- Public transit access: SEPTA bus: 12, 21, 42, 57
- Website: Official website

The Powel House is a historic house museum located at 244 South 3rd Street, between Willings Alley and Spruce Street, in the Society Hill neighborhood of Philadelphia, Pennsylvania. Built in 1765 in the Georgian style, and embellished by second owner Samuel Powel (1738–1793), it has been called "the finest Georgian row house in the city." As with other houses of this type, the exterior facade is understated and simple, but the interior was elaborately appointed.

== History ==
The elegant brick city house was built for Charles Stedman, a merchant and shipmaster. Before he occupied it, Stedman fell into financial trouble – eventually winding up in debtors' prison. The house was purchased for £3,150 on August 2, 1769, by Samuel Powel, who would become the last mayor of Philadelphia under British rule and the city's first mayor following independence. A Quaker who converted to Anglicanism, he supported the American Revolution and was dubbed the "Patriot Mayor."

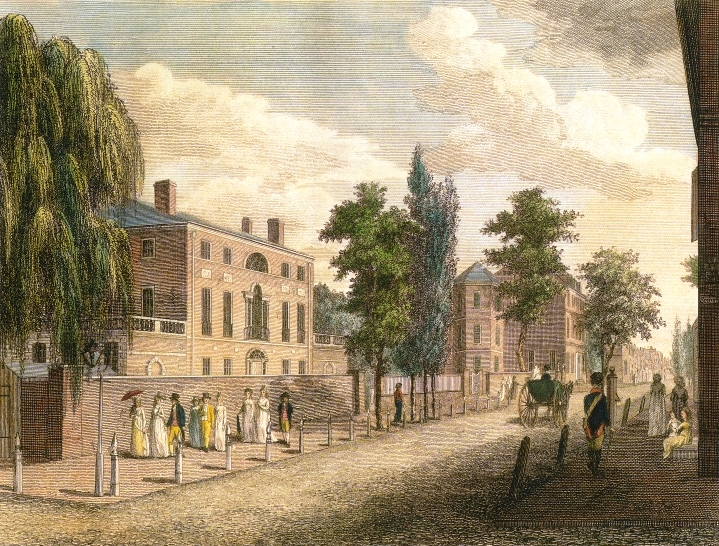
View in Third Street, from Spruce Street, Philadelphia (1799) by William Birch. The Powel House is the building right of center, with the 3-story half-turret addition.

Design of the building is attributed to architect/builder Robert Smith. Powel and his wife Elizabeth (née Willing) lavishly redecorated, creating some of the most ornate interiors in the Colonies. The Rococo plastered ceilings are attributed to James Clow, and the architectural woodwork is attributed to carvers Hercules Courtnay and Martin Jugiez.

The Powel House shared a party wall with the Governor John Penn house, next door. The governor's house was confiscated during the Revolutionary War, and George and Martha Washington occupied it for several months, following the October 1781 victory at Yorktown. The Powels entertained the Washingtons, and other notable guests, such as Benjamin Franklin, John Adams, Benjamin Rush, and the Marquis de Lafayette.

Philadelphia served as temporary national capital from 1790 to 1800, and President Washington occupied a house on Market Street for more than six years. Prior to moving in, he built a two-story, semicircular "Bow Window" addition to the south wall of the President's House, enlarging the State Dining Room and the State Drawing Room above it. This may have inspired the Powels to build the three-story half-turret addition to their city house. While its exterior was canted (like a bay window), the interior wall seems to have been bowed (curved), enlarging the rear parlors on the first and second floors and the rear bedroom on the third, and adding windows overlooking the garden. The half-turret addition is visible in a 1799 print by William Birch and an 1817 print attributed to William Strickland. Some time in the mid-19th century, the half-turret addition was demolished and the south wall of the Powel House became a party wall shared with a new building.

Samuel Powel died in the 1793 yellow fever epidemic that killed about 10% of the city's population. After President-Elect John Adams passed on buying them, Mrs. Powel bought a number of items from soon-to-be-ex-President Washington in early 1797. These included his presidential coach and horses (the coach is now at Mount Vernon), his presidential desk (now at the Philadelphia History Museum), and a pair of girandole mirrors (now at Mount Vernon). Elizabeth Willing Powel sold this house in November 1798, to William Bingham, the husband of her niece Ann Willing Bingham.

The Marquis de Lafayette gave the Powels a set of china that is on display in the Powel House. A 1793 portrait of Mrs. Powel attributed to Matthew Pratt is on long-term loan from the Pennsylvania Academy of the Fine Arts.

=== Saved from demolition ===
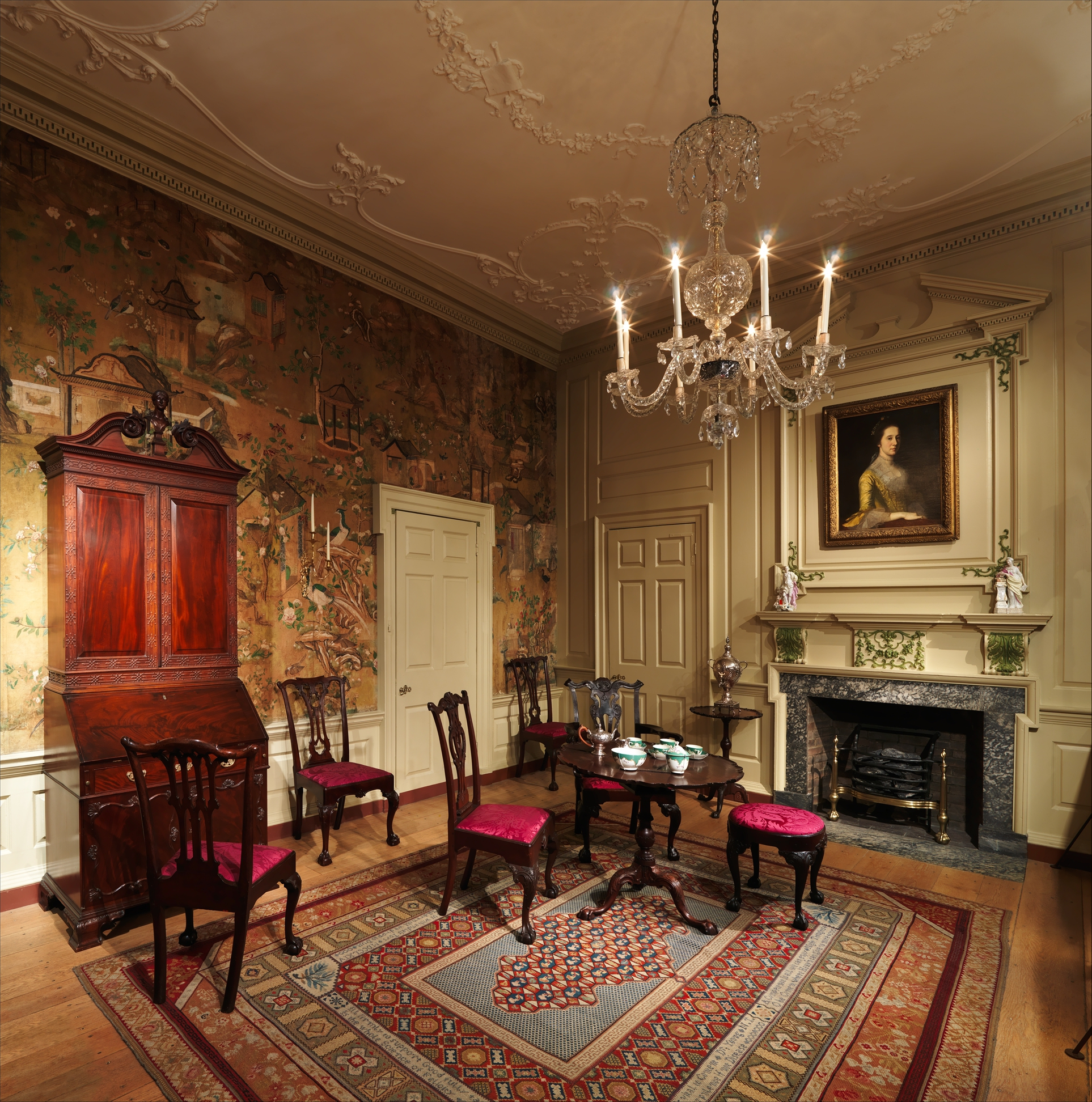
Powel House Parlor, as installed in the Metropolitan Museum of Art.

Early in the 20th century, the house served as a warehouse for a business that imported and exported Russian and Siberian horse hair and bristles. In 1918, the owners sold the second floor rear parlor's architectural woodwork to the Metropolitan Museum of Art, where it is now a period room in the American Wing. The ballroom's plaster ceiling and architectural woodwork was sold to the Philadelphia Museum of Art in 1925. By 1930, the Powel House was slated for demolition, with the property to be converted into a parking lot.

Antiquarian Frances Wister saved the house, forming the Philadelphia Society for the Preservation of Landmarks and raising the funds to purchase the property in 1931. Over the next decade, Wister and the Society bought and demolished the 19th-century building that covered the east end of the walled garden, and hired architect H. Louis Duhring Jr. to restore the house to its appearance during Powel's residency and re-create its lost interiors. The Society opened the restored house as a museum interpreting the daily lives of wealthy Philadelphians at the time of the American Revolution.

Today, the rich history of the Powel House may be seen in its decorative arts collection, its portraits of Powels and Willings, and its formal, walled garden so typical of Colonial Philadelphia. Its beautiful entryway, ballroom with bas-relief plasterwork, and mahogany wainscoting give the house its reputation as perhaps America's finest existing Georgian Colonial townhouse.

In more recent years, it has been alleged that the house is haunted by the ghost of Peggy Shippen, Elizabeth Powel's second cousin and wife of Benedict Arnold.

== Gallery ==
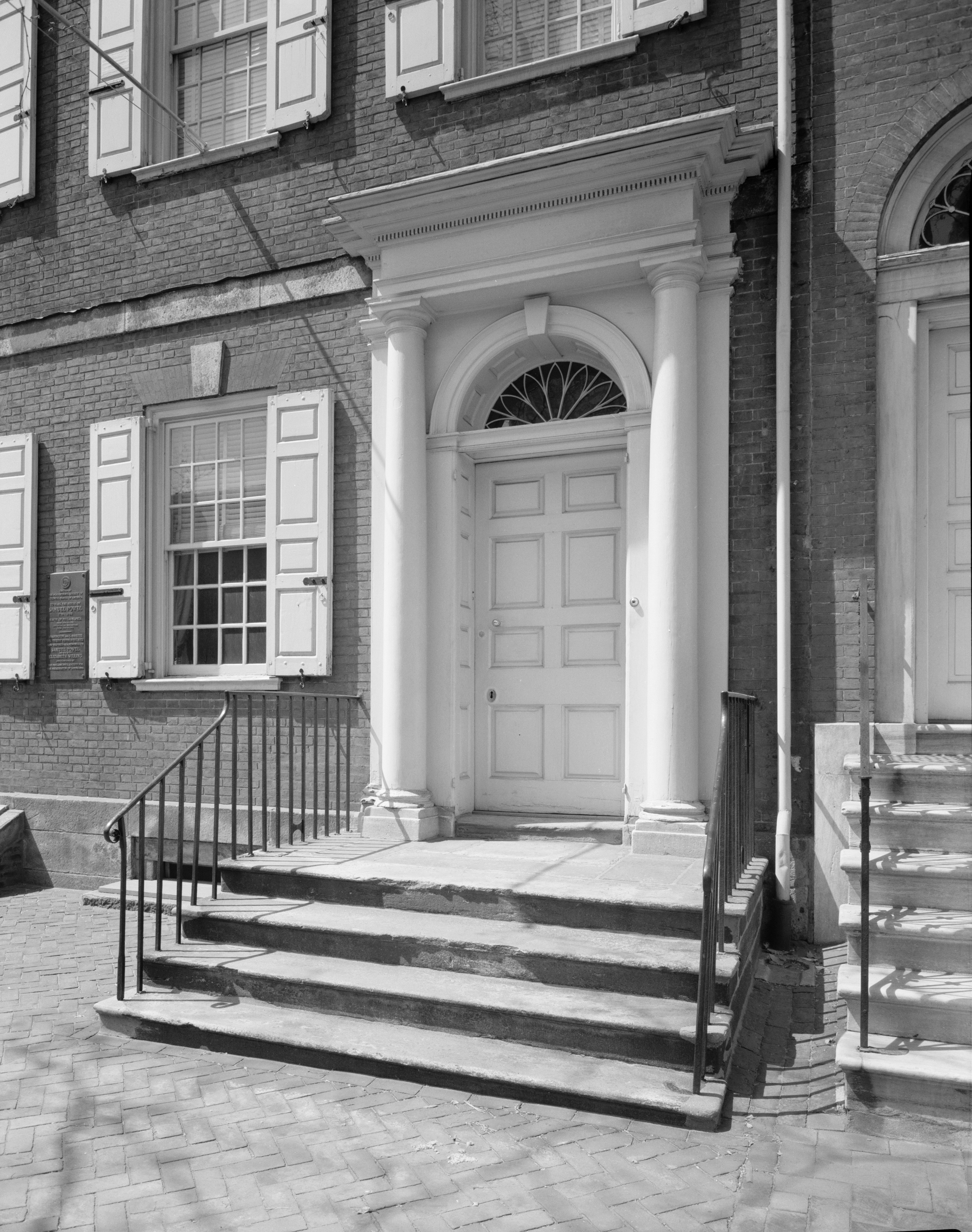
Front door.

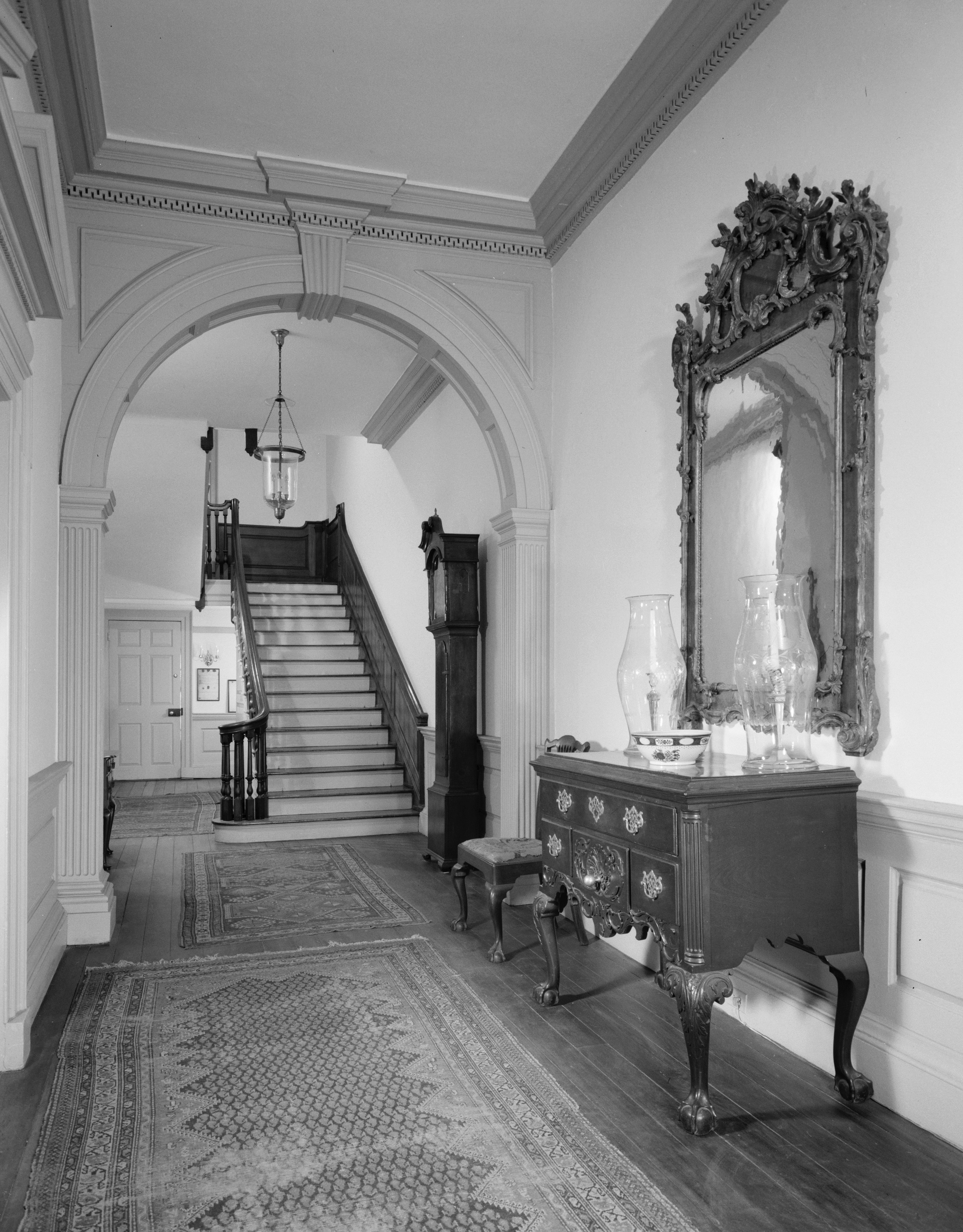
Entrance hall.

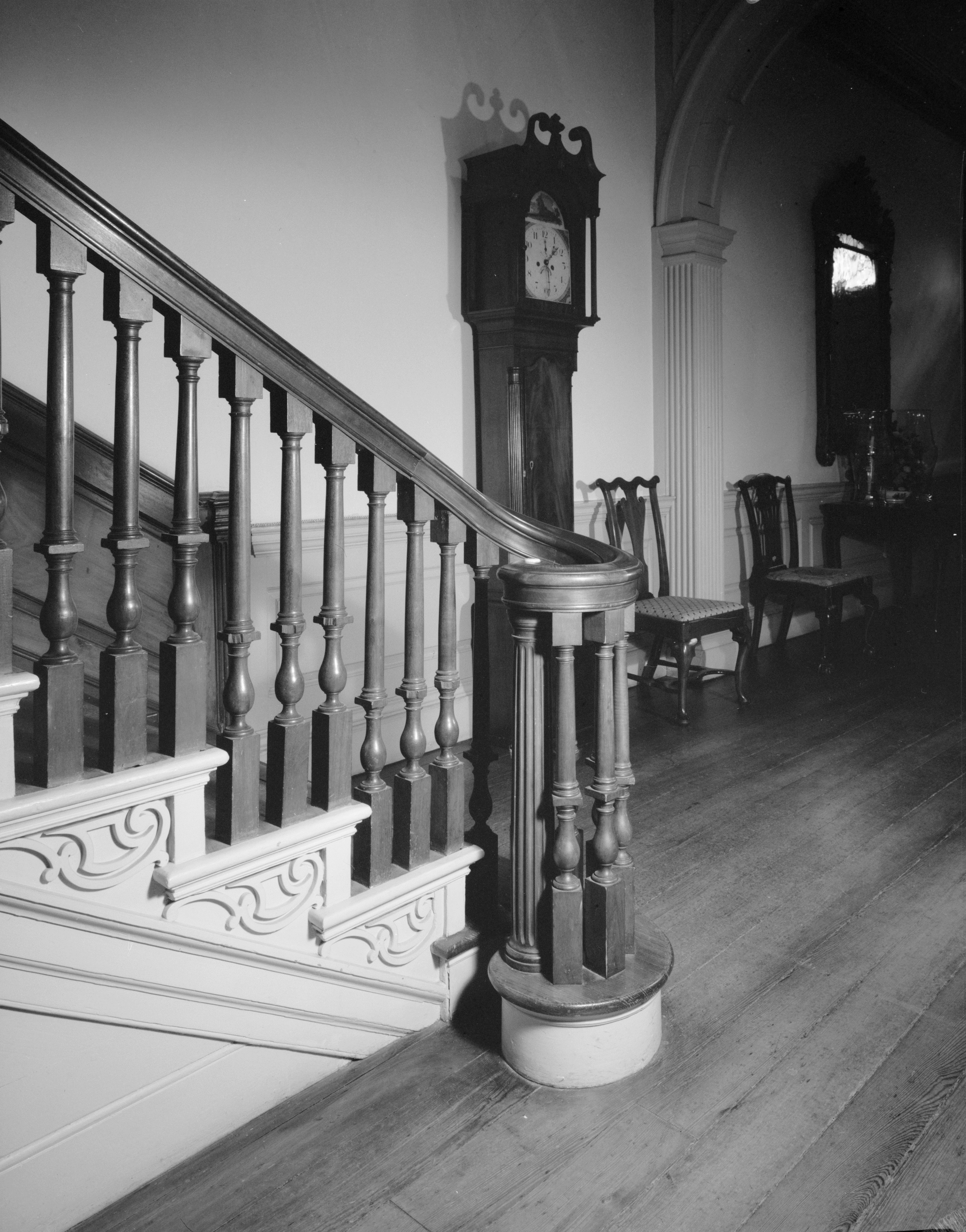
Mahogany staircase.

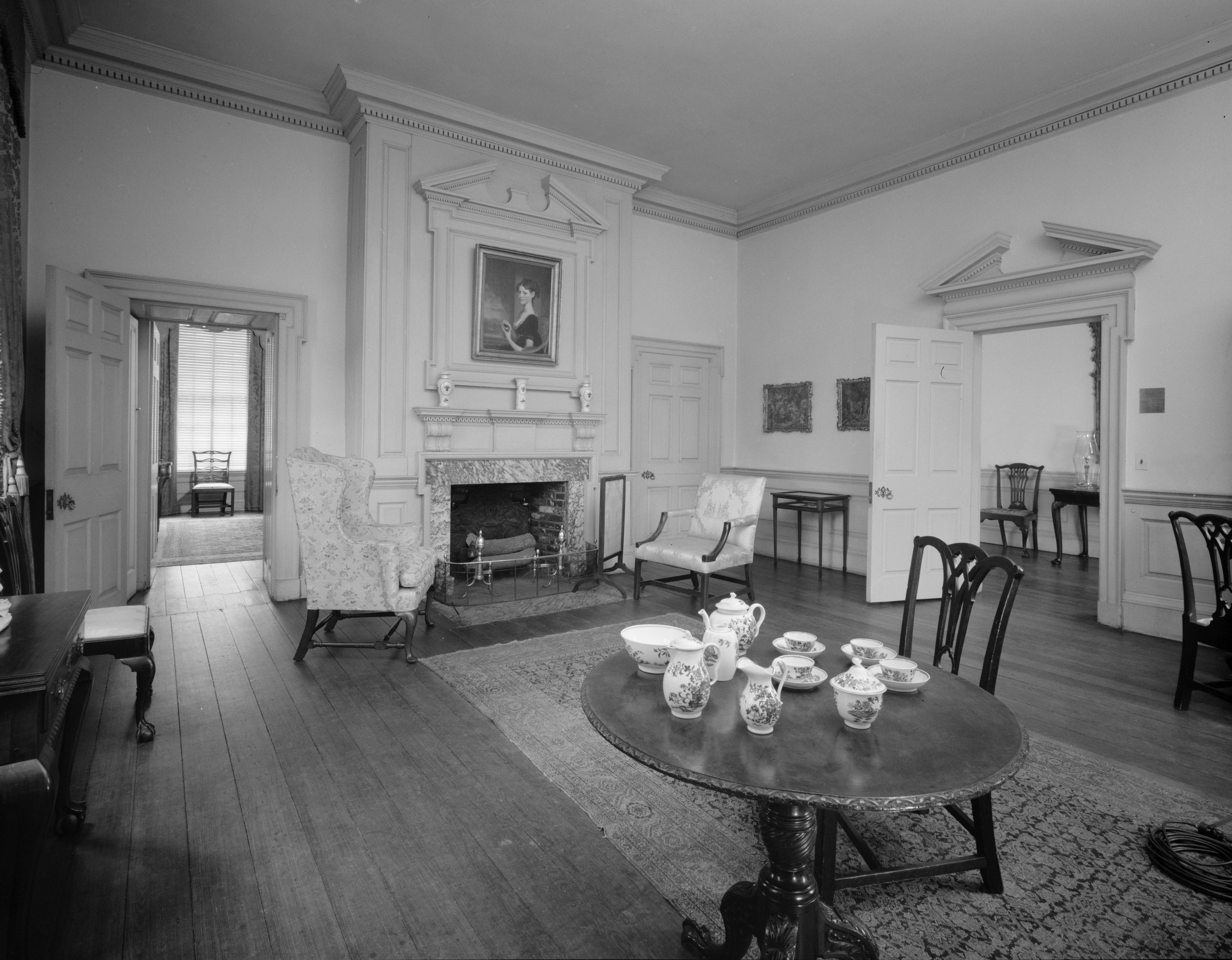
First floor front parlor.

== In popular culture ==
- The 1986 CBS miniseries George Washington II: The Making of a Nation used the Powel House garden as a stand-in for the garden of the President's House in Philadelphia.
- In Harry Turtledove's alternate history Southern Victory Series novels, Philadelphia becomes the de facto capital of the United States in the 1880s and the Powel House, the executive mansion. During a 1942 Confederate bombing raid of Philadelphia, President Al Smith is killed at the house.

== See also ==
- Powelton Village
