= Robert P. Watson =

American author and political candidate

- Born: 1962 (age 63–64)
- Occupations: Political scientist, historian, author
- Title: Distinguished Professor of American History; Avron Fogelman Research Professor

Robert P. Watson (born 1962) is an American political scientist and a historian of US politics, and the author of several books on US political and military history. Watson holds the titles Distinguished Professor of American History, Avron Fogelman Research Professor, and Assistant Director of the Center for Citizenship and Civility at Lynn University in Florida.

== Education ==
Watson holds a bachelor's degree from Virginia Tech, a master's degree from the University of West Florida, and a Ph.D. from Florida Atlantic University. He was a member of the football and track teams at Virginia Tech and has been inducted into two sports halls of fame.

== Career ==
Watson held positions at Troy University, Northern Arizona University, the University of Hawaiʻi at Hilo, and Florida Atlantic University, before joining the faculty of Lynn University in 2007. He has won several Distinguished Teacher of the Year awards in his career. He also taught with the Junior Statesman Foundation at Yale, Stanford, and Georgetown, and served as a visiting scholar at several universities in the US.

== Books ==
Watson is the author of books, including:

- The Presidents' Wives: Reassessing the Office of the First Lady (Lynne Rienner Publishers, 2000; 2nd ed., 2014)
- First Ladies of the United States: A Biographical Dictionary (Lynne Rienner Publishers, 2001)
- Affairs of State: The Untold History of Presidential Love, Sex, and Scandal (Bloomsbury Publishing, 2012)
- America's First Crisis: The War of 1812 (SUNY Press, 2014)
- The Nazi Titanic: The Incredible Untold Story of a Doomed Ship in World War II (Hachette Books, 2016)
- The Ghost Ship of Brooklyn: An Untold Story of the American Revolution (Hachette Books, 2017)
- George Washington's Final Battle: The Epic Struggle to Build a Capital and Nation (Georgetown University Press, 2021)
- Escape! The Story of the Confederacy's Infamous Libby Prison and the Civil War's Largest Jail Break (Bloomsbury Publishing, 2021)
- America's First Plague: The Deadly 1793 Epidemic that Crippled a Young Nation (Bloomsbury Publishing, 2023)
- When Washington Burned: The British Invasion of the Capital and a Nation's Rise from the Ashes (Georgetown University Press, 2023)
- Rebels at the Gates (Bloomsbury, 2025)
- Declaration: The Story of America’s Independence (Bloomsbury, 2026)
