= Republican Court =

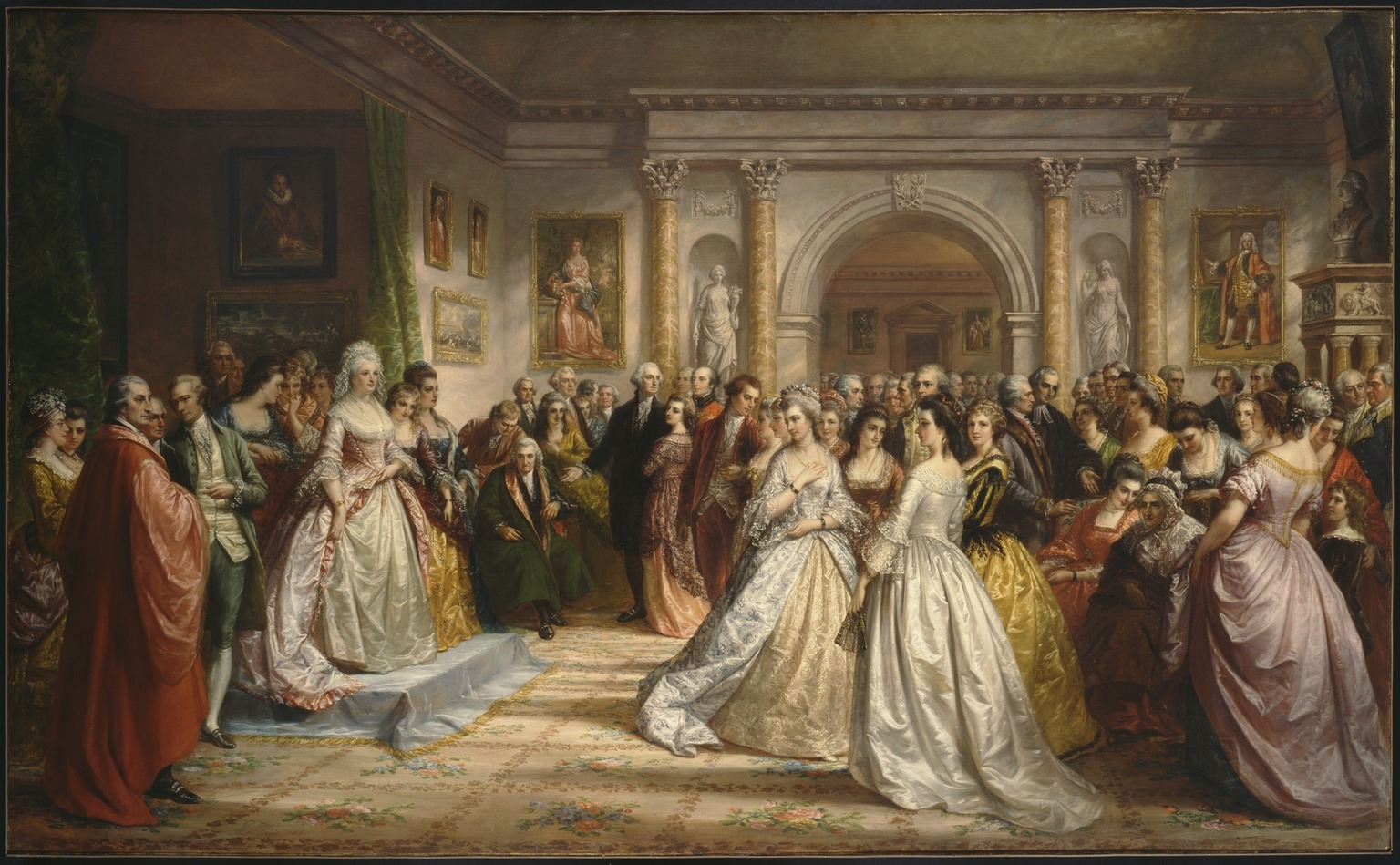
Republican Court, or, Lady Washington's Reception Day, painting by Daniel Huntington, c. 1861

The Republican Court was a group of American political figures, intellectuals, and their spouses which formed in the late 1700s and early 1800s around the president and first lady of the United States. It centered around social gatherings at the home of George and Martha Washington in Philadelphia, and more broadly among the various social elite of the city. As an informal political association, it provided an important avenue for women to participate in discourse on political philosophy and matters of state.

The political climate at the time was later memorialized by Rufus Wilmot Griswold in his work, The Republican Court or American Society in the Days of Washington, published in 1855.

== See also ==
- Political culture of the United States
