= Philadelphia Society for the Preservation of Landmarks =

Organization based in Philadelphia, Pennsylvania

Coordinates: 39.94409°N 75.14826°W

- Formation: 1931
- Purpose: Managing four house museums in the Philadelphia area
- Headquarters: 321 South 4th Street; Philadelphia, Pennsylvania, 19106
- Executive Director: Kayla Anthony
- Website: Official website

The Philadelphia Society for the Preservation of Landmarks (aka Landmarks) founded in 1931, maintains and preserves four historic house museums in the region around Philadelphia, Pennsylvania. These are:

- Grumblethorpe
- Hill-Physick-Keith House
- Powel House
- Waynesborough

These are open for the education and enjoyment of the public and its members.

== History ==
The Philadelphia Society for the Preservation of Landmarks has played a significant role in the historic preservation movement in Philadelphia by restoring, furnishing, and presenting to the public its distinguished house museums.

In 1931, roused by the news that the historic Powel House was to be demolished in six weeks, Frances Anne Wister and Sophia Cadwalader, and a group of strong supporters, including famous names like Biddle, Barnes, Curtis, and Lippincott, founded Landmarks to save the house. The newly formed Landmarks was successful despite the Great Depression of the time and within another ten years had acquired Grumblethorpe in Germantown.

In the late 1960s, Ambassador and Mrs. Walter Annenberg restored Hill-Physick-Keith House, and then donated the house to Landmarks.

In 1981, Landmarks entered into an agreement with Easttown Township, Pennsylvania to administer historic Waynesborough.

Landmarks attempts to carry on the vision of Wister by managing the four house museums and bringing thousands of visitors and schoolchildren each year to learn about Philadelphia's history.

Landmarks has served as the sponsor in the Philadelphia region for the Road Scholar program, formerly known as Elderhostel. On average, Landmarks Road Scholar Program attracts over 2,000 visitors annually to the Philadelphia region to enjoy its many historical and cultural resources. Landmarks Road Scholar ranks 20th out of a total of 638 sponsors around the world.

Landmarks is a major supporter of the Philadelphia Orchestra, Philadelphia Museum of Art, Philadelphia Flower Show, the Barnes Foundation, and other organizations through its purchase of admission tickets to these fine organizations.

Landmarks Road Scholar accounts for over $500,000 in purchases of hotel rooms and services throughout the Philadelphia region.
