= Robert Feke =

18th-century American painter

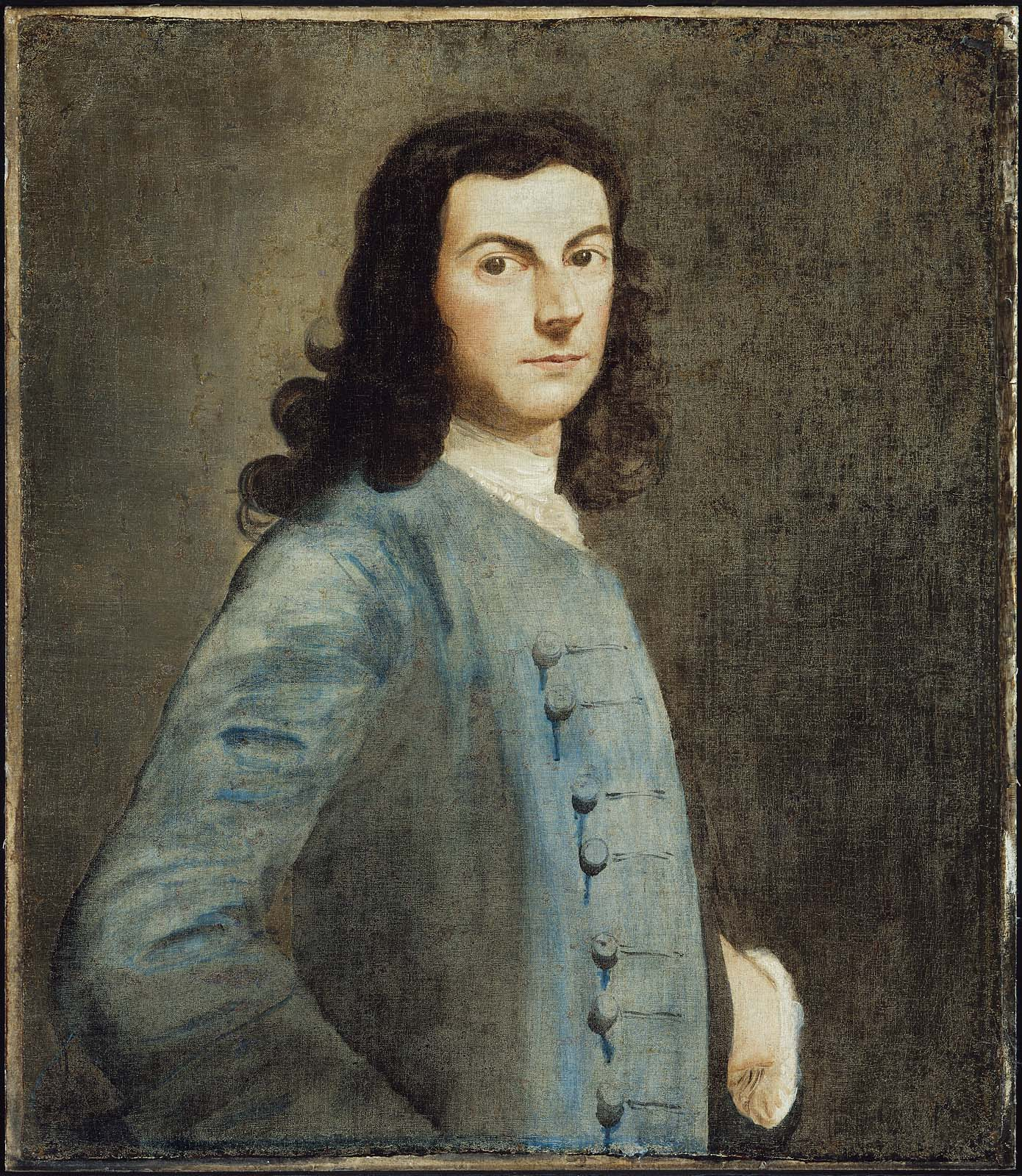
A self-portrait of Feke

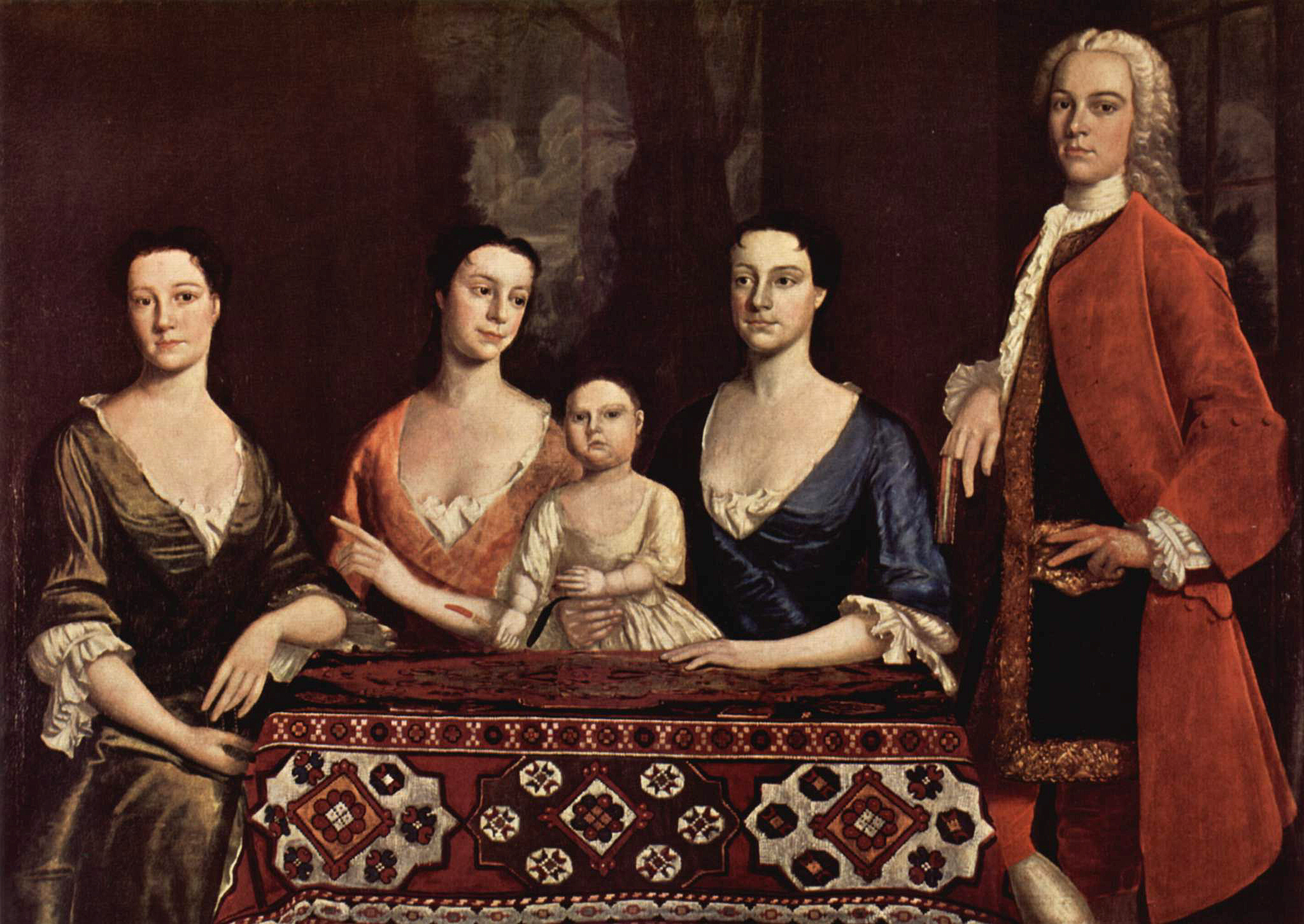
Isaac Royall and Family (1741), Harvard Law School

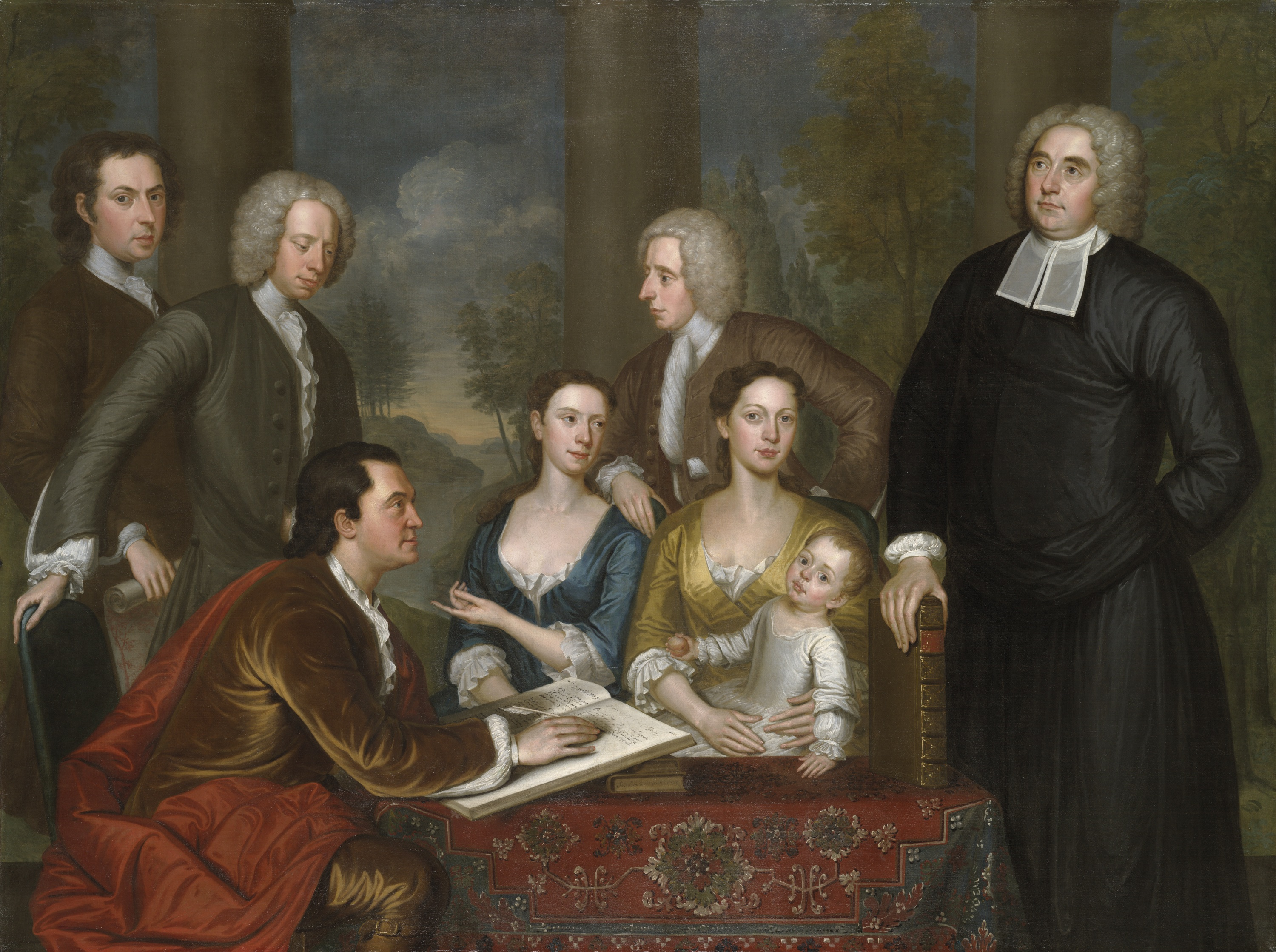
John Smibert, The Bermuda Group (Dean Berkeley and His Entourage), begun in 1728, finished 1739. Yale University Art Gallery

Robert Feke (c. 1705 – c. 1752) was an American portrait painter born in Oyster Bay, New York. According to art historian Richard Saunders, "Feke's impact on the development of Colonial painting was substantial, and his pictures set a new standard by which the work of the next generation of aspiring Colonial artists was judged." In total, about 60 paintings by Feke survive, twelve of which are signed and dated.

== Life and career ==
One of Robert Feke's grandmothers was Elizabeth Fones (Elizabeth Fones Winthrop Feake Hallett).

Little is known for certain about his life, particularly his early years. Only one work by Feke, a portrait of a child, is datable before 1741. In that year he moved to Boston, where he painted Isaac Royall and Family (1741), a group portrait which borrows its composition from John Smibert’s The Bermuda Group (1729). Feke's works also show the influence of John Wollaston.

From 1741 until 1750, Feke worked in Boston, Newport, Rhode Island, and Philadelphia, painting wealthy merchants and landowners. The latest record of his activities is August 26, 1751; suggestions by Feke's early biographers that he died in Barbados or Bermuda have not been substantiated.

== Works ==
- Benjamin Franklin, Portrait (c. 1746) at the Fogg Museum, Harvard University Portrait Collection
- Charles Apthorp, Portrait 1748, oil on canvas, Cleveland Museum of Art American
- Grizzell Eastwick Apthorp, Portrait (Mrs. Charles Apthorp) (1748) at the Fine Arts Museums of San Francisco
- Mrs. John Banister, 1748, oil on canvas, The Detroit Institute of Arts
- William Bowdoin
- John Channing, c. 1747–49, oil on canvas 127 x 102, Museum of Fine Arts, Boston
- Mary Channing (Mrs. John Channing), c. 1747–49, oil on canvas 127 x 102, Museum of Fine Arts, Boston
- Tench Francis, Sr., Portrait at the Metropolitan Museum of Art
- Captain Alexander Graydon, c. 1746, oil on canvas, National Gallery of Art American Museum of Fine Arts
- Thomas Hopkinson, Portrait at the Smithsonian Institution
- Ralph Inman
- Susannah Speakman Inman
- Hannah Speakman Rowe
- Isaac Royall and Family, Portrait, 1741, Historical & Special Collections, Harvard Law School Library
- Edward Shippen, Portrait of Chief Justice, at the Philadelphia Museum of Art
- Isaac Winslow, c. 1748, Oil on canvas 127 x 102, Museum of Fine Arts, Boston

== Gallery ==
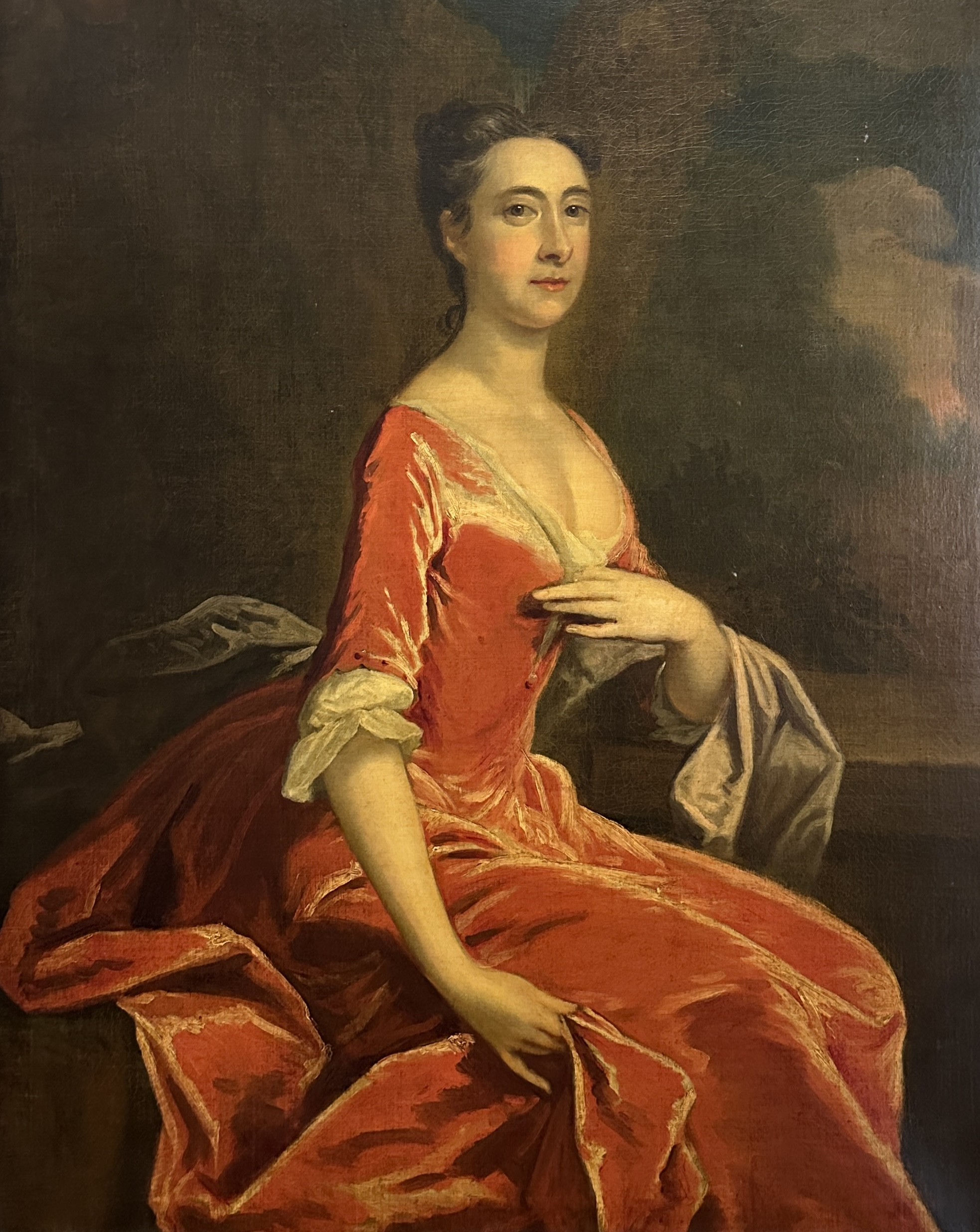
Portrait of a Young Woman (1740s), Washington County Museum of Fine Arts

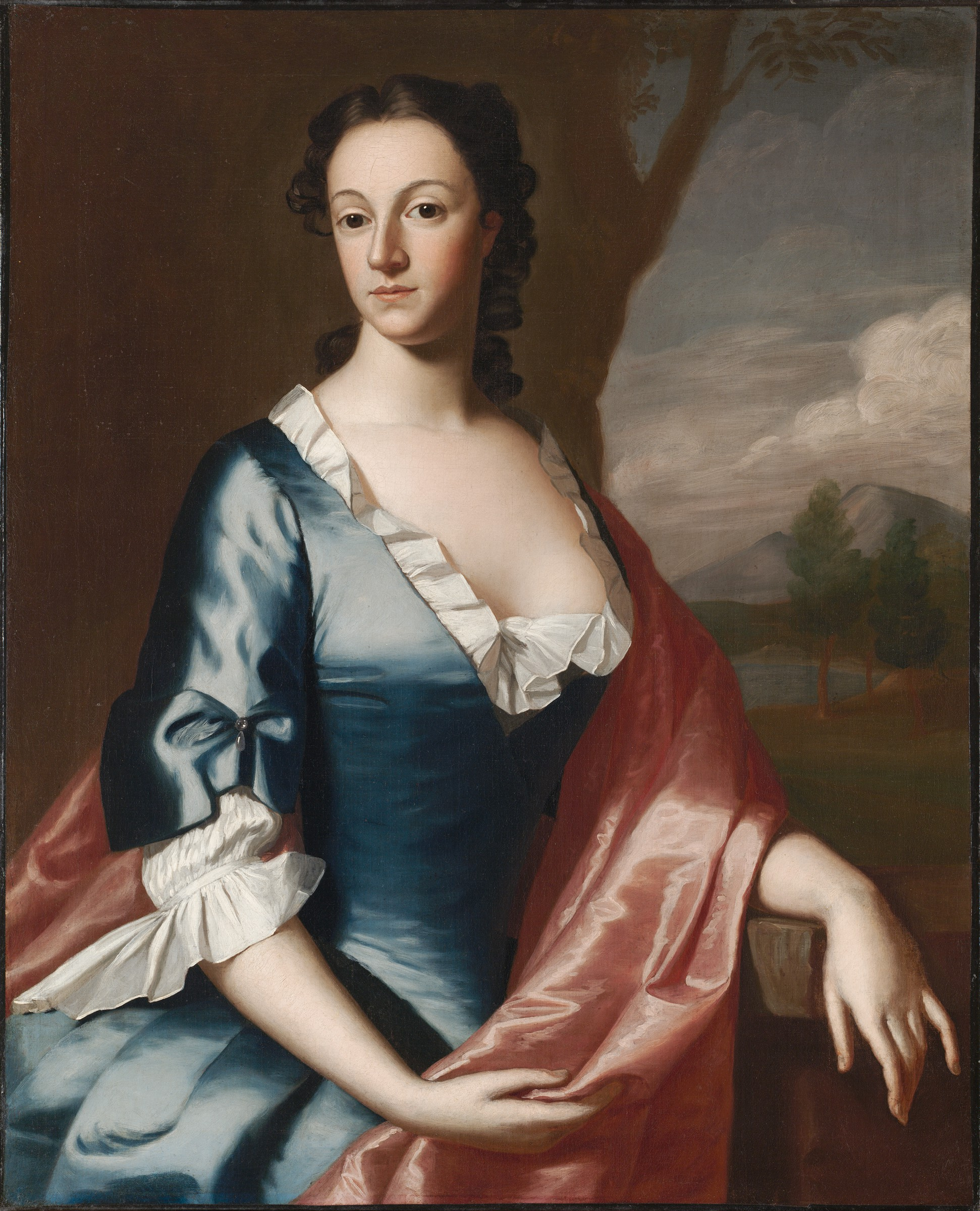
Portrait of Susannah Speakman Inman, c. 1748

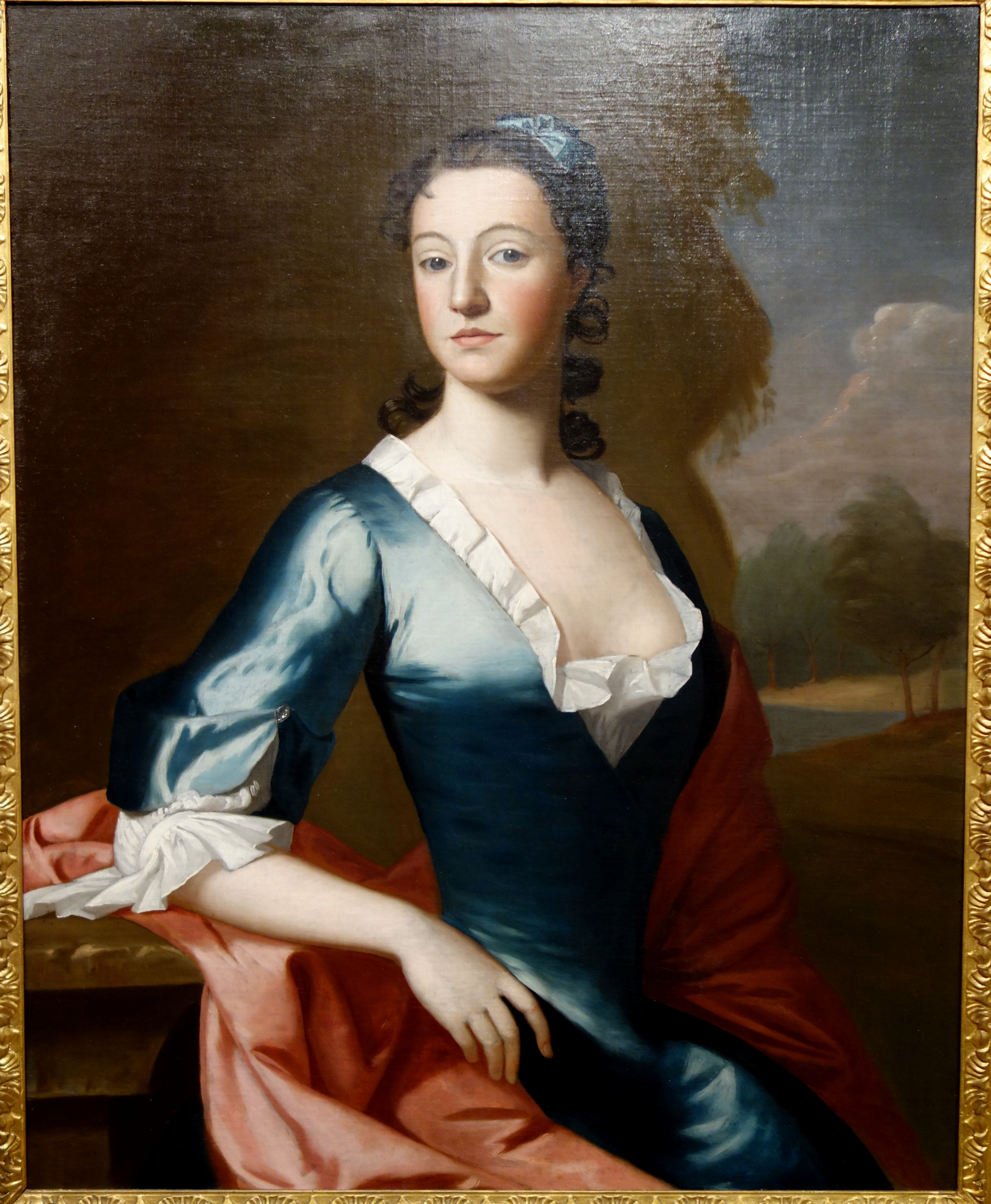
Portrait of Hannah Speakman Rowe, c. 1748

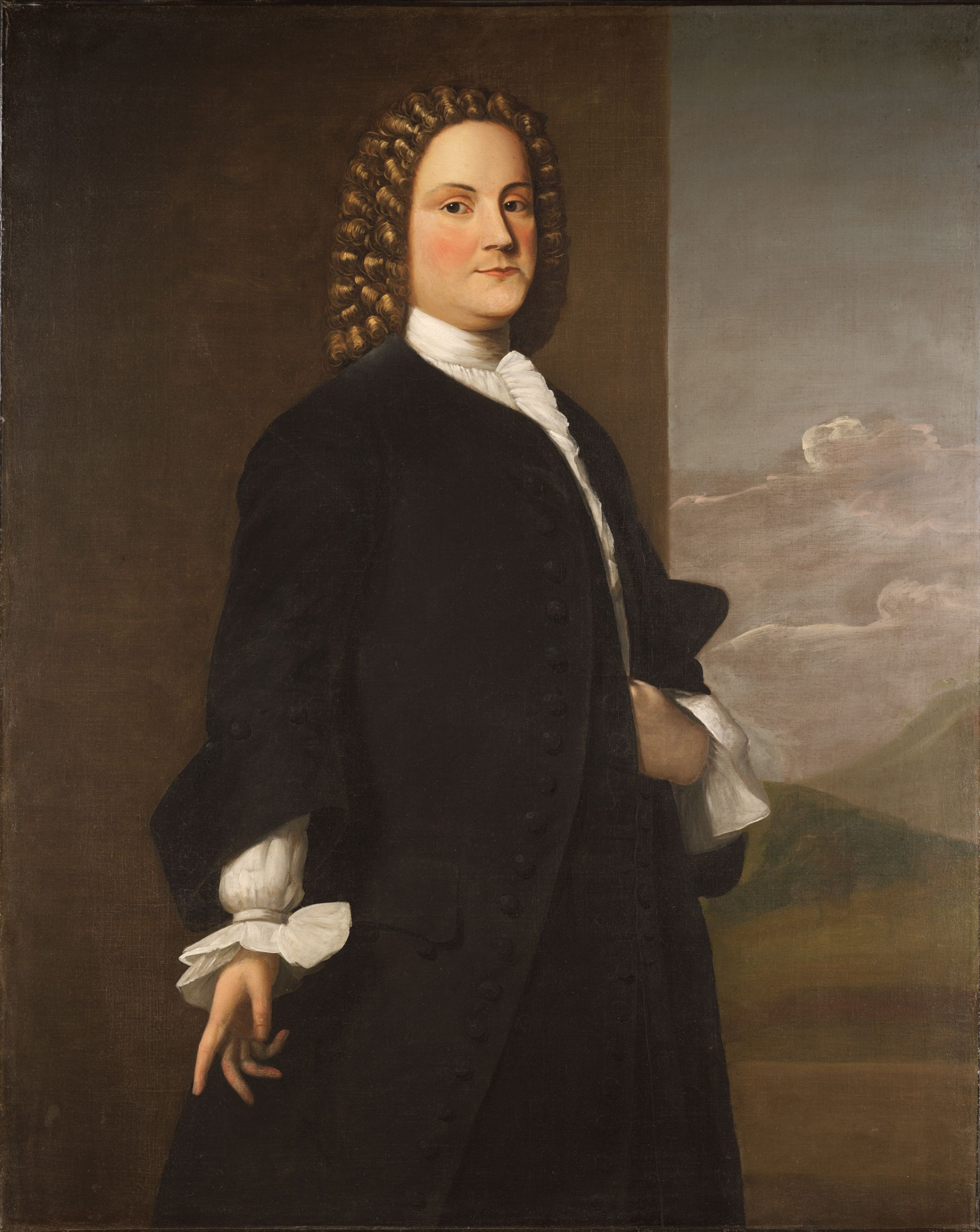
Portrait of Benjamin Franklin c. 1746–1750, (Note: According to Professor Zara Anishanslin.), widely believed to be the earliest known painting of Franklin

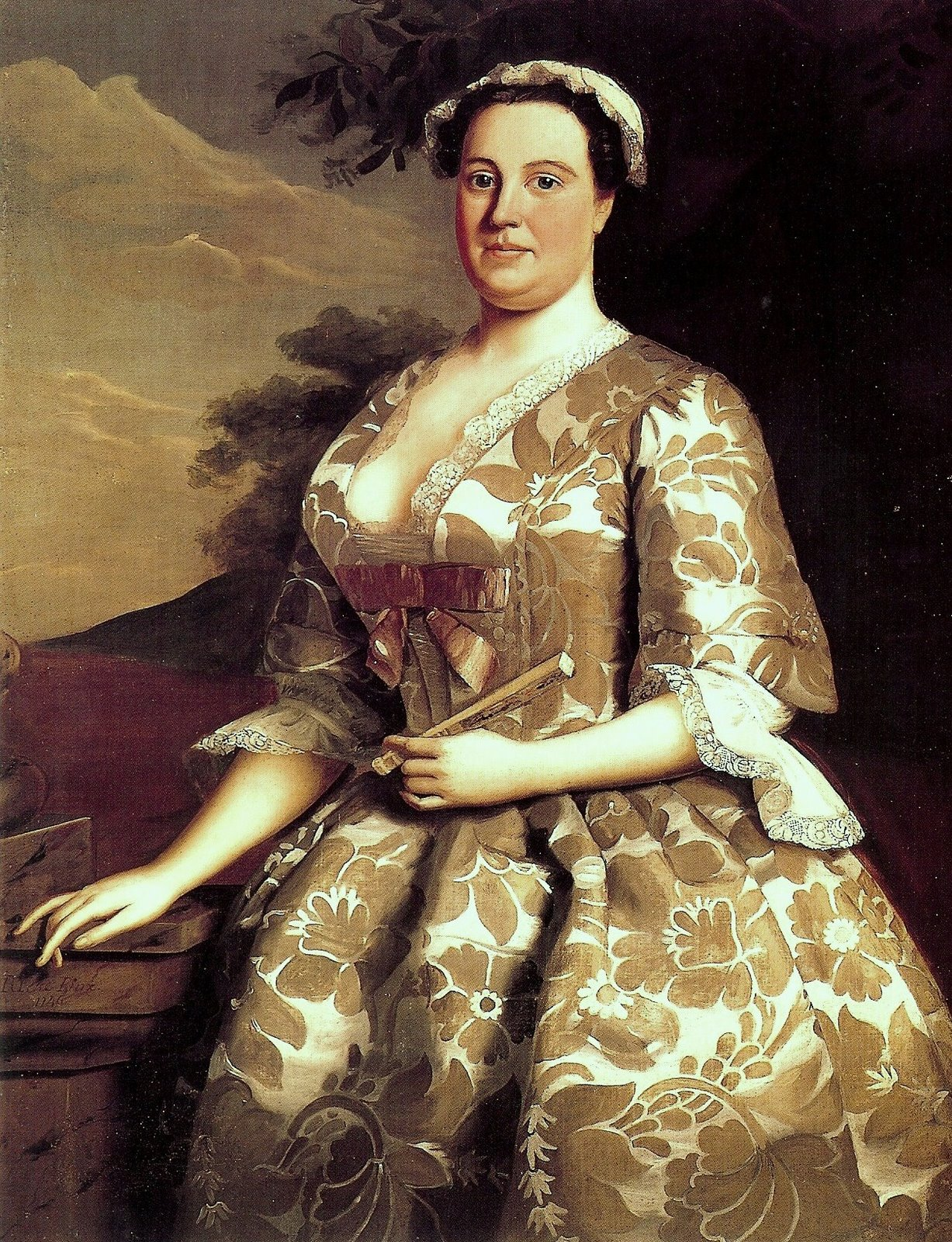
Mrs. Charles Willing (1746), Winterthur Museum, Garden and Library

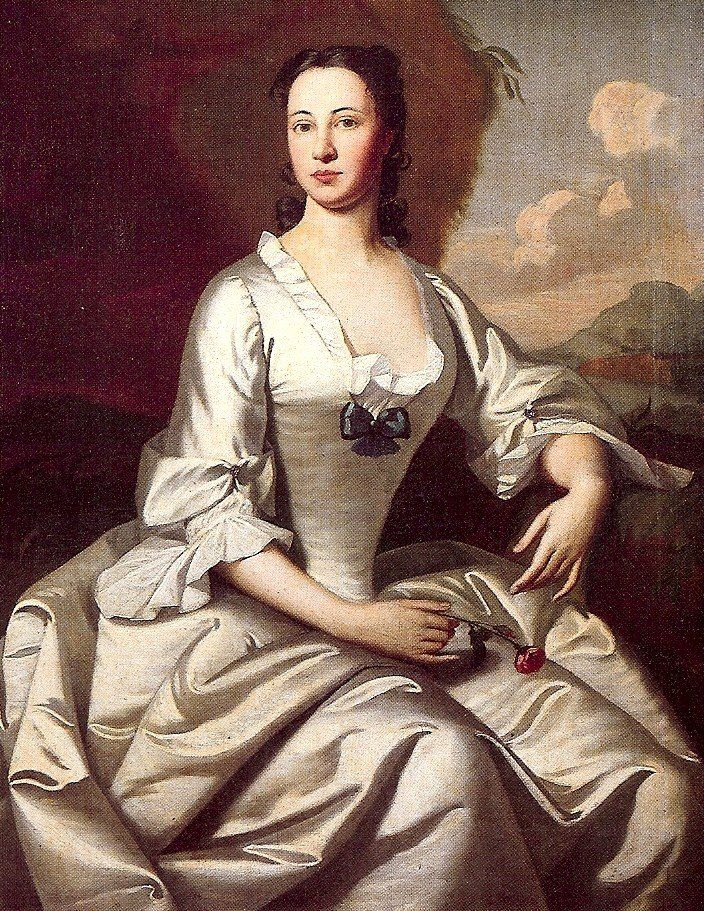
Susannah Boutineau (1748)

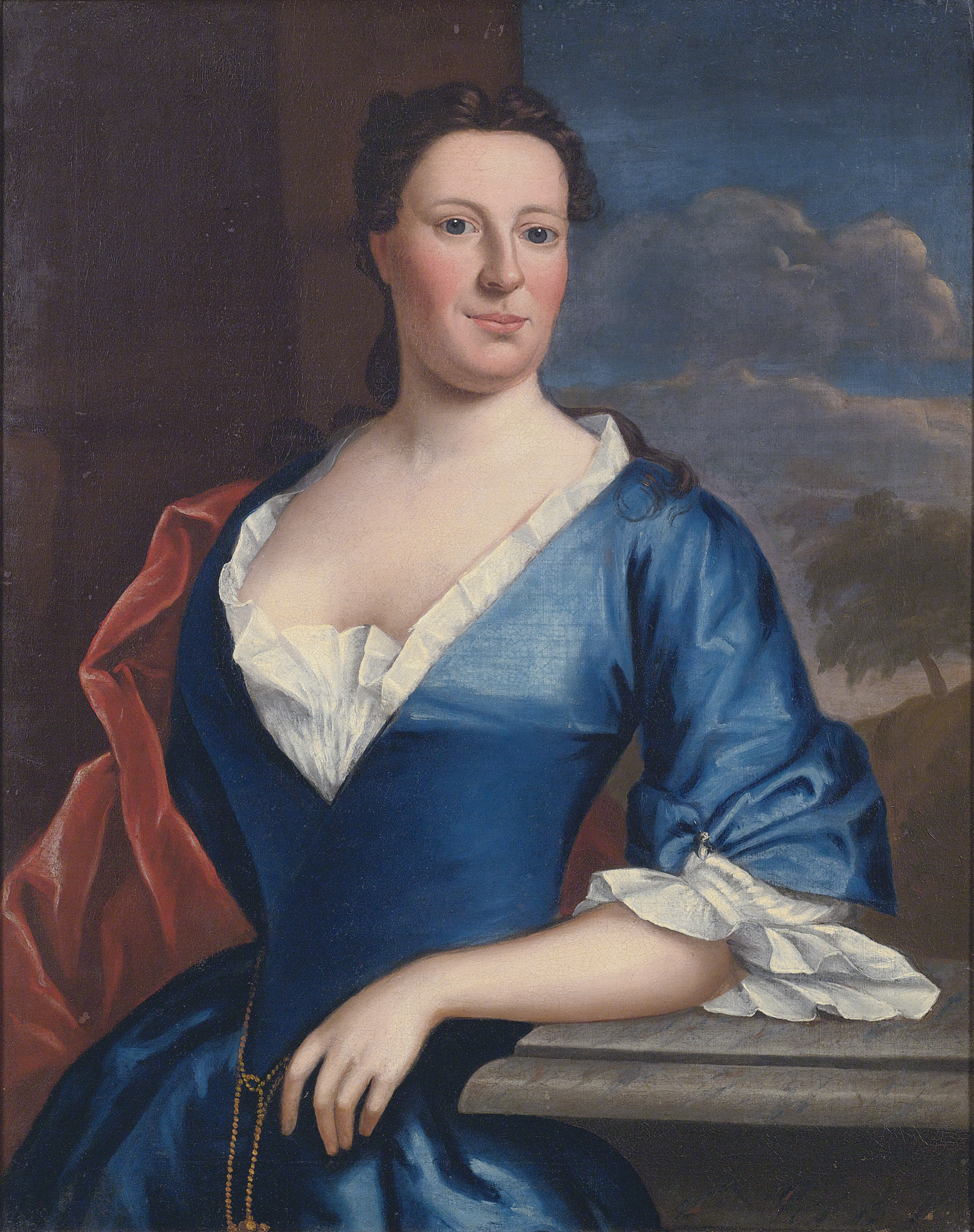
Portrait of Elizabeth Francis (c. 1748)

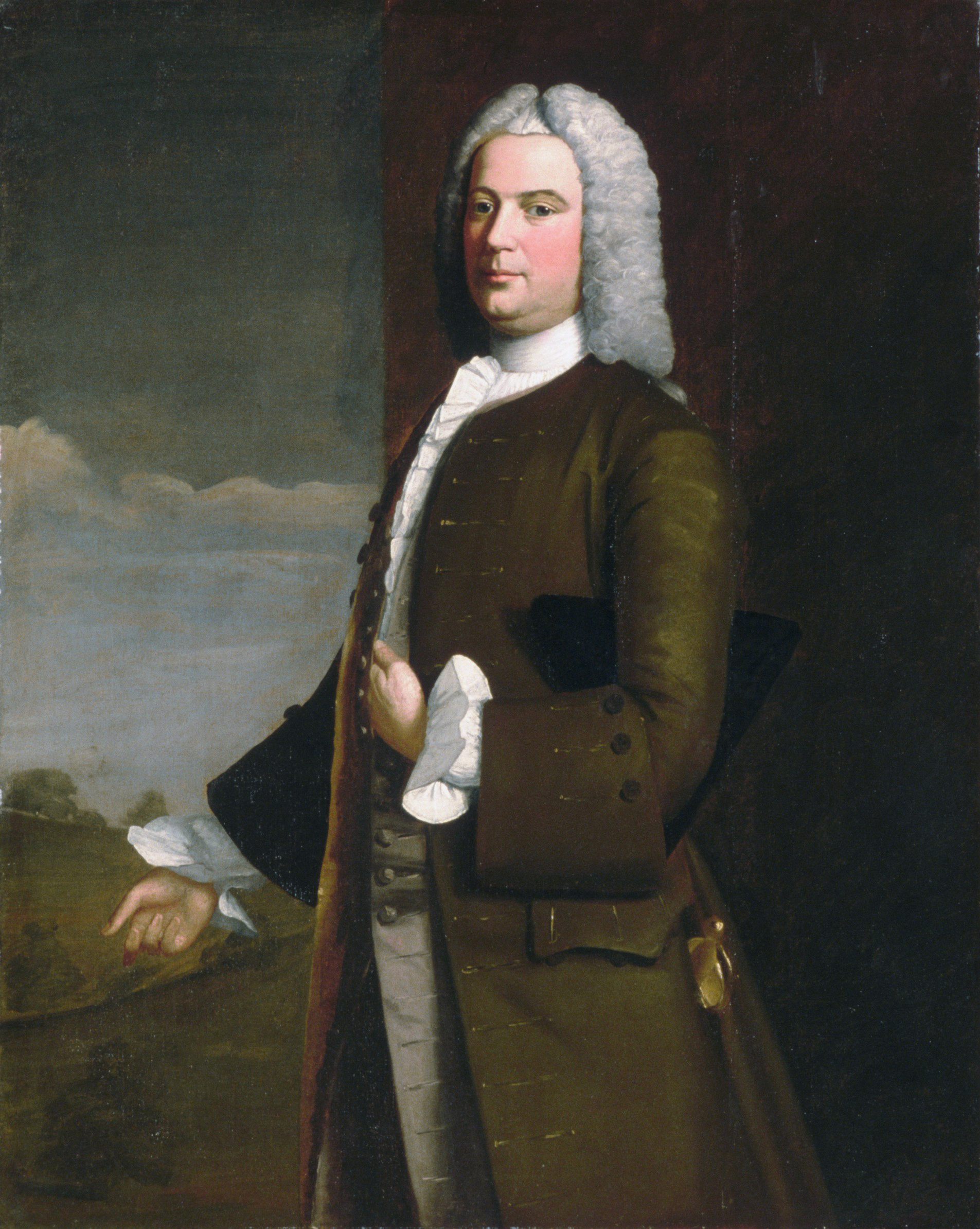
Tench Francis Sr. (1746), Metropolitan Museum of Art

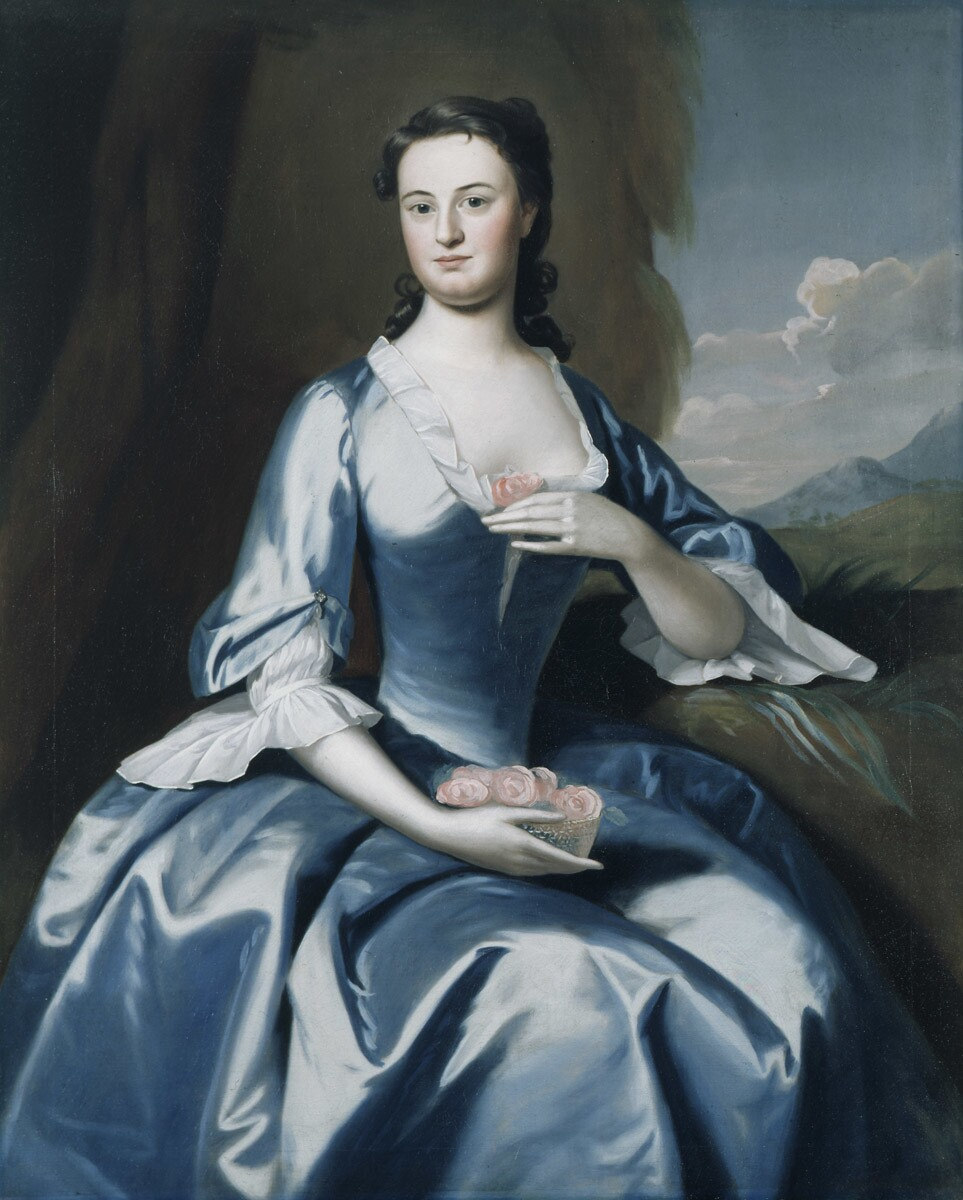
Portrait of Elizabeth (Erving) Bowdoin

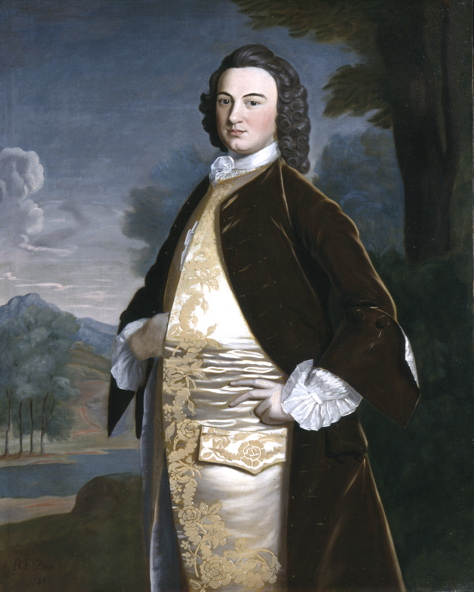
Portrait of James Bowdoin II

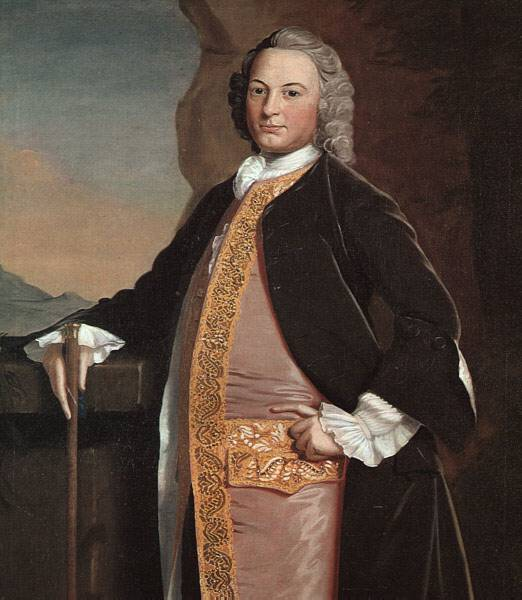
Portrait of William Bowdoin (1748)

Portrait of Robert Apthorp by Robert Feke, c. 1748

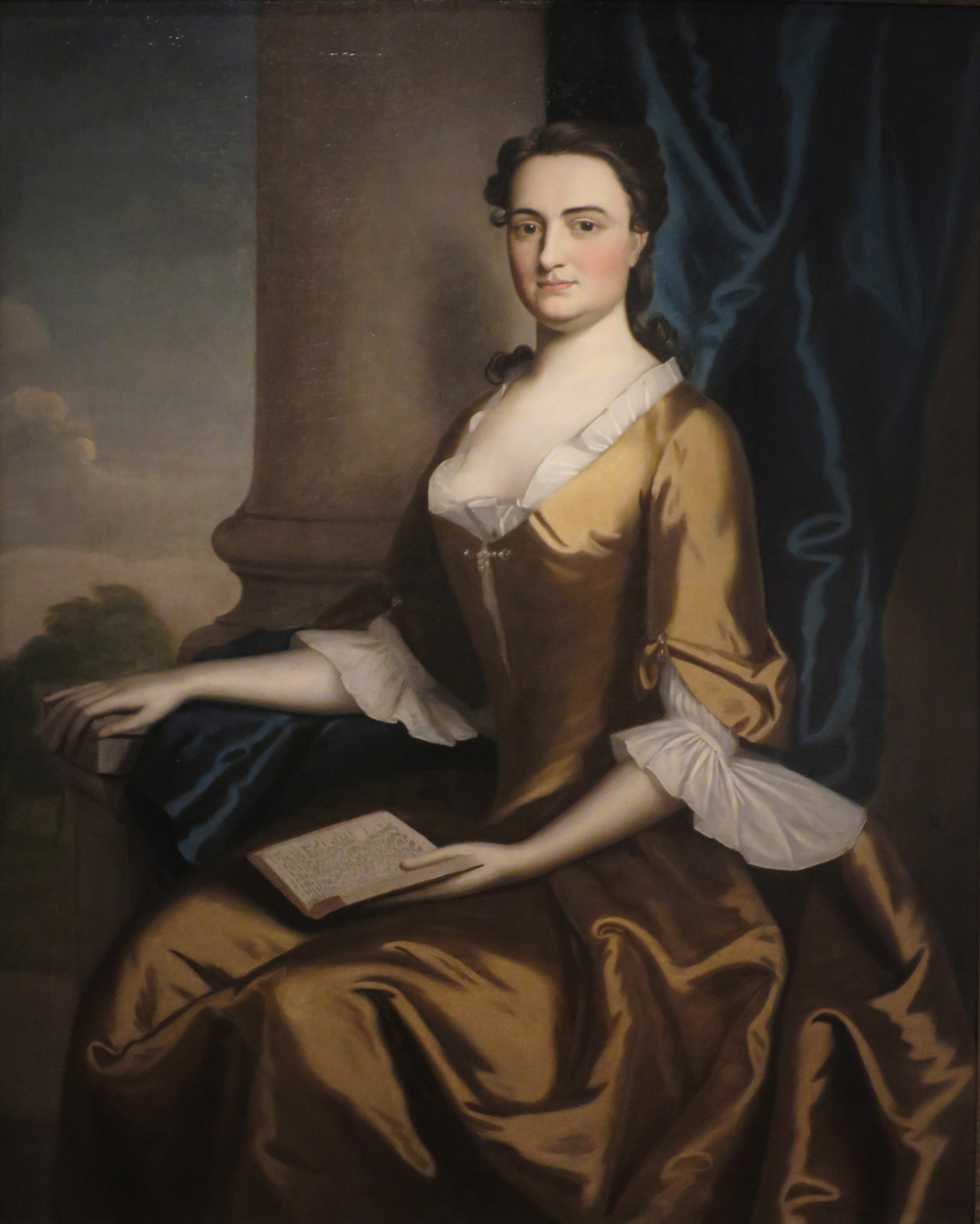
Portrait of Grizzel Eastwick Apthorp

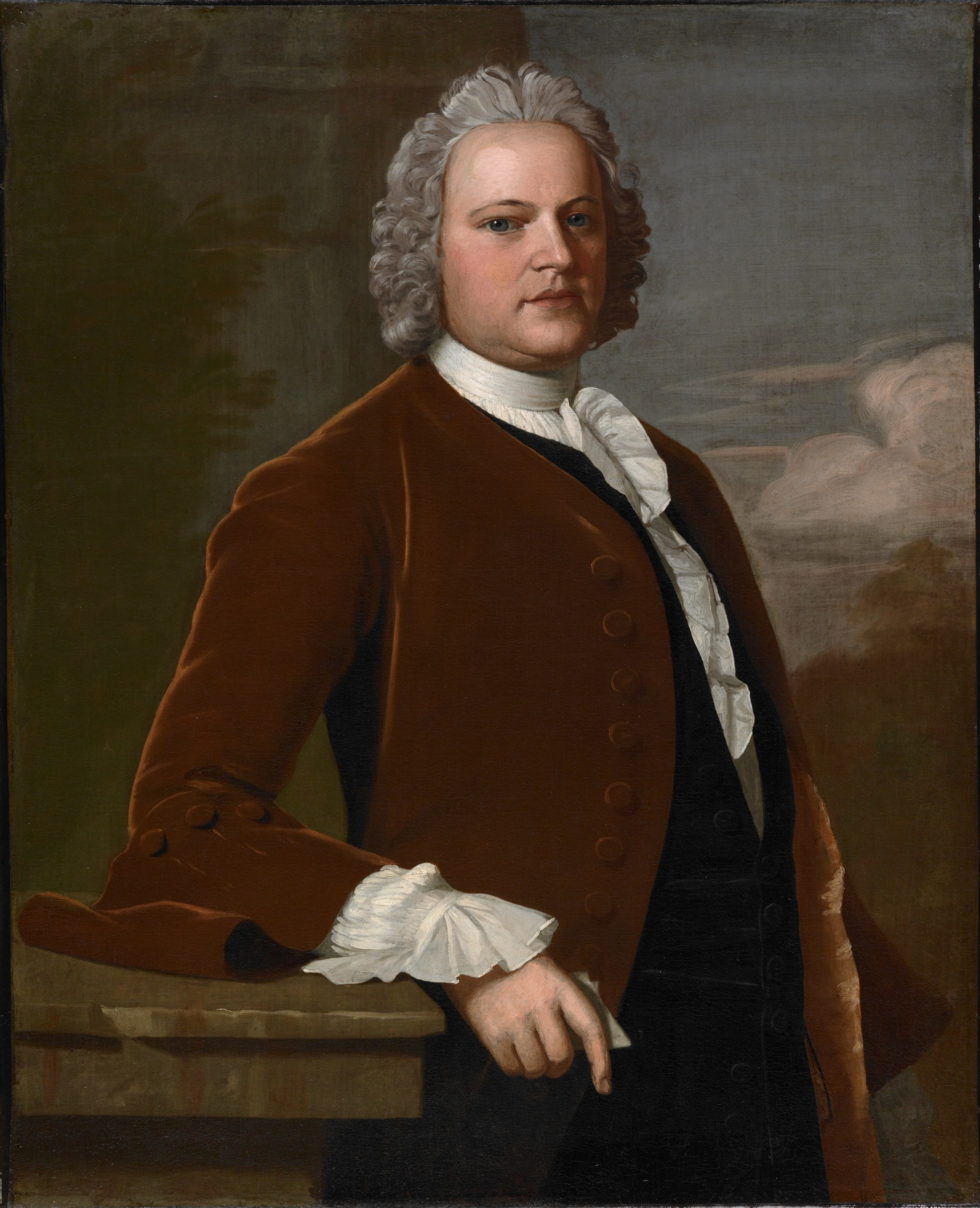
Ralph Inman (1748)

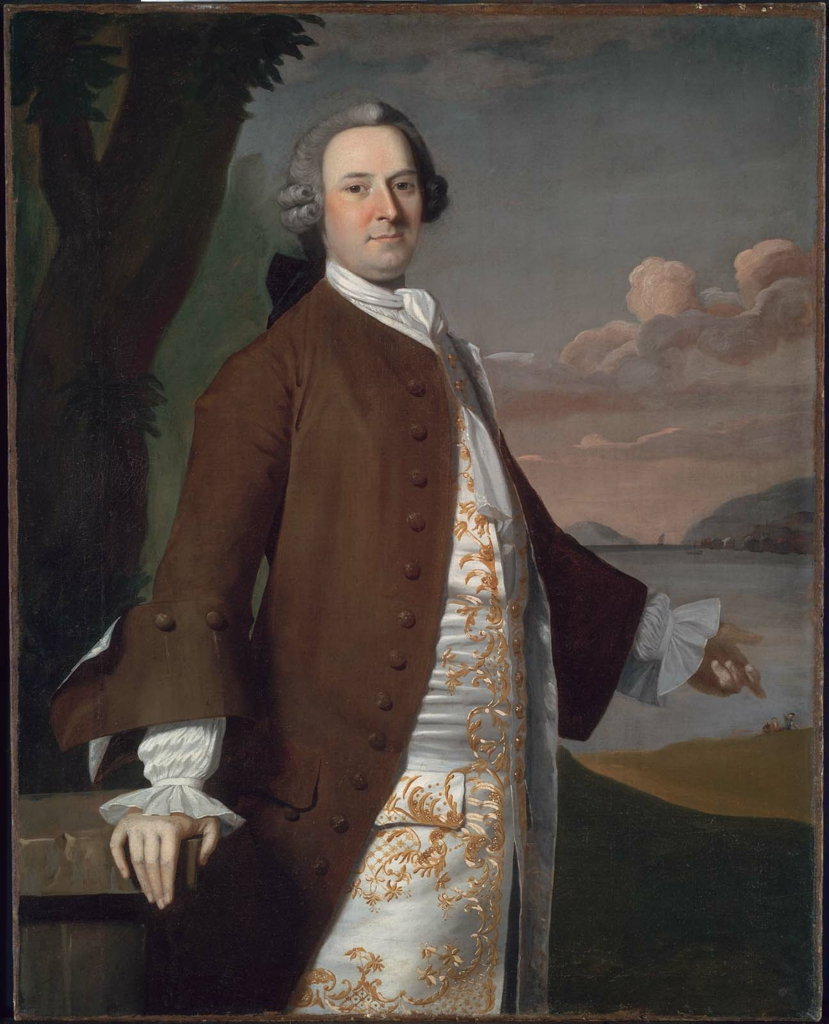
Isaac Winslow (c. 1748), Museum of Fine Arts, Boston

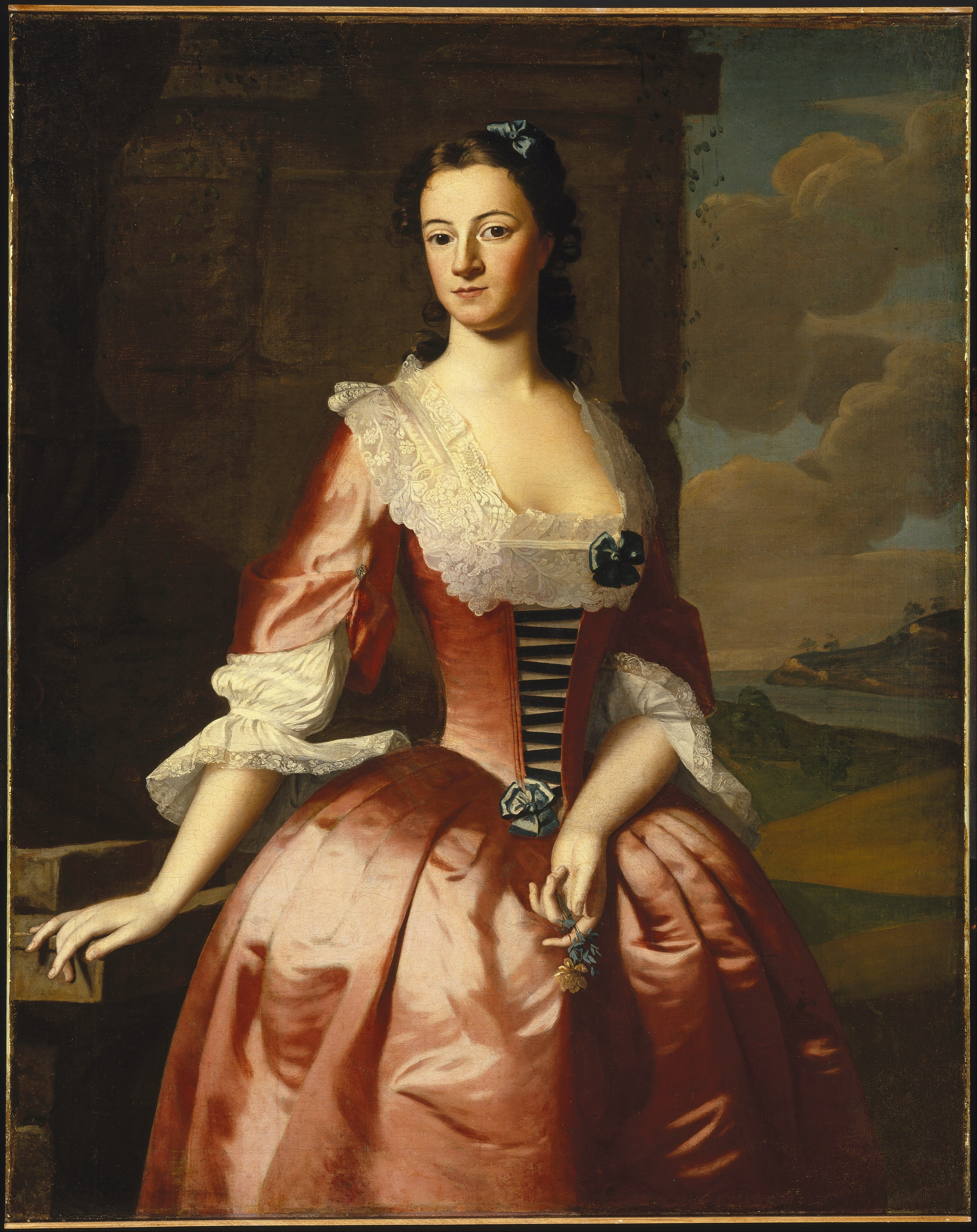
Portrait of a Woman (Mrs. Lucy (Waldo) Winslow (c. 1748), Brooklyn Museum
