= List of places named for Loyalists (American Revolution) =

This is a list of places in the United States and Canada named for residents of British North America who remained loyal to the British Crown up to and through the American Revolution. In what would become the United States, many prominent Loyalists and their families played integral roles in the development of the Thirteen Colonies. In Canada many Loyalists were honored by the Crown for their loyalty and places were named after them largely while Canada was still a colony.

== United States ==
=== Counties ===
- Fairfax County, Virginia is named after Lord Thomas Fairfax, the only British resident peer in British North America
- Tryon County, New York and Tryon County, North Carolina were both named for William Tryon (though later renamed).

=== Streets ===
- Allens Lane in Mount Airy, Pennsylvania
- Rivington Street, named after Loyalist journalist James Rivington
- Tryon Avenue in the Norwood section of the Bronx
- Tryon Road in Wake County, Raleigh, North Carolina
- Tryon Street in Burlington, North Carolina
- Tryon Street in Charlotte, North Carolina
- Tryon Street in Hillsborough, North Carolina
- Tryon Street in Albany, New York
- Tryon Street in South Glastonbury, Connecticut

=== Other places ===
- William Allen Middle School, in Moorestown, New Jersey
- William Allen High School, Pennsylvania's third largest public high school
- The Boot Monument at Saratoga National Historical Park in Stillwater, New York, commemorates the service of Major General Benedict Arnold for the Continental Army in the Battles of Saratoga
- A plaque on the grounds of the United States Military Academy at West Point commemorates Benedict Arnold without mentioning him - bears only a rank and a date but no name: "major general...born 1740"
- A historical marker in Danvers, Massachusetts commemorates Benedict Arnold's 1775 expedition to Quebec
- Bayley Seton Hospital in the Clifton section of Staten Island was named in part for Richard Bayley, father of Saint Elizabeth Ann Seton
- Thomas Bull Memorial Park in Montgomery in Orange County, New York is named after an obscure but influential British sympathizer.
- Camm Hall at William and Mary College's campus adjacent to Colonial Williamsburg in Virginia is named after Rev. John Camm.
- Copley Square and Copley Plaza in Boston are named after painter John Singleton Copley
- Inman Square in Cambridge, Massachusetts is likely named after Ralph Inman
- Mathews Muliner Playground in the Bronx in New York City is named after David Mathews, Mayor of New York City under the British during the war
- Tryon Palace in New Bern, North Carolina
- Fort Tryon Park in Manhattan, New York City
- Tryon Hills, a neighborhood in Charlotte, North Carolina

== Canada ==
=== Counties ===
- Brant County in Ontario is named after Joseph Brant

=== Cities, towns, and villages ===
- Brantford in southwestern Ontario is named after Joseph Brant
- The township of Tyendinaga and the Tyendinaga Mohawk Territory are named for Brant's Mohawk name
- Gilberts Cove, Nova Scotia is named after Thomas Gilbert
- Tiddville, Nova Scotia is named after former New York Loyalist Samuel Tidd

=== Streets ===
- Blowers Street in Halifax, Nova Scotia named after Sampson Salter Blowers
- Burch Street in Niagara Falls, Ontario named after John Burch, Loyalist from New York
- Herkimer Street in Hamilton, Ontario named after Johan Jost Herkimer, Loyalist from New York
- Hughson Street in Hamilton, Ontario is named after Nathaniel Hughson

=== Other places ===
- Joseph Brant Hospital in Burlington, Ontario
- A dormitory and one of the squadrons at the Royal Military College of Canada are named for Brant.
- The Col. John Butler School in Niagara-On-The-Lake was named after John Butler
- Life-size busts of Joseph Brant and John Butler are in the Valiants Memorial in Ottawa
- Lac Sir John, a small lake near Lakefield in Gore, Quebec is named after Sir John Johnson, 2nd Baronet
- Joel Stone Park in Gananoque, Ontario is named after Joel Stone
- Wentworth Valley in Nova Scotia is named after former New Hampshire Governor John Wentworth

== Sources ==
Davidson, Steven. Loyalist Name Places of Nova Scotia
