= Ralph Inman =

American merchant (1713–1788)

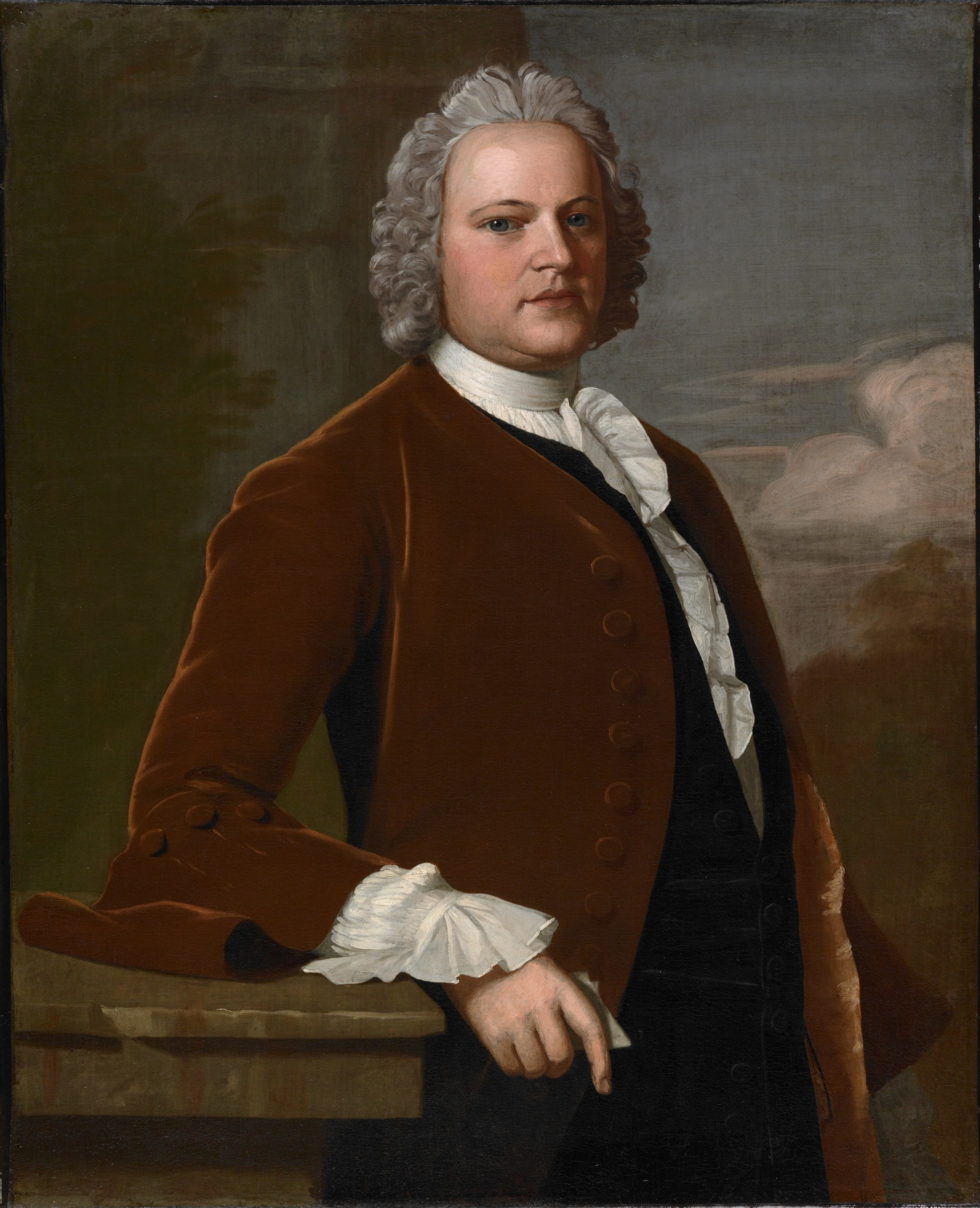
A 1748 portrait of Inman by Robert Feke

Ralph Inman (1713–1788) was an American merchant active in Boston with a residence in Cambridge, Massachusetts. During the American Revolution he was a Loyalist. Portraits of Inman were made by Robert Feke and John Singleton Copley.

== See also ==
- Inman Square

== Image gallery ==
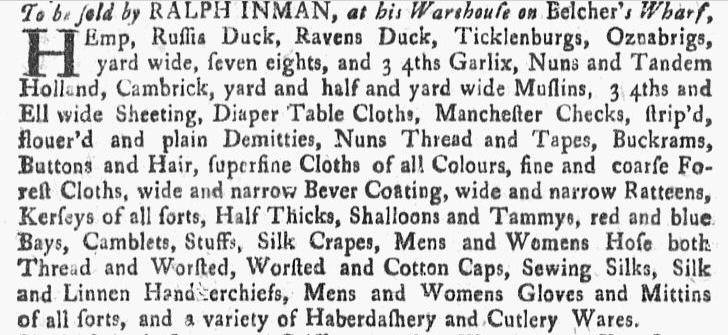
Newspaper item, 1747. "To be sold by Ralph Inman, at his warehouse on Belcher's Wharf," Boston (Boston Evening-Post)

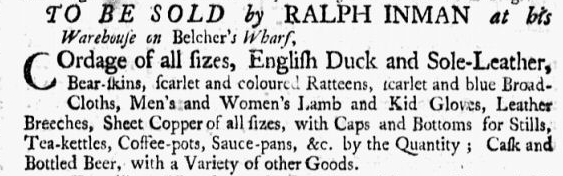
Newspaper item, Boston Post-Boy, 1750

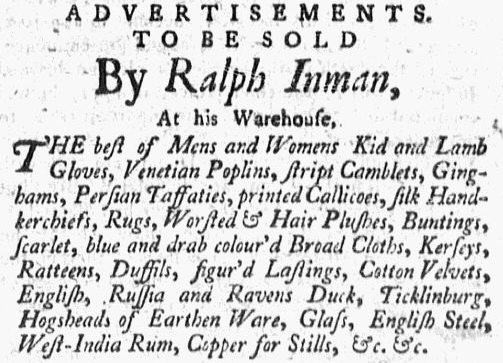
Newspaper item, 1760

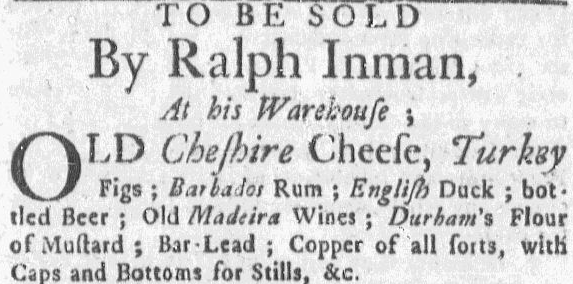
Newspaper item, 1764
