= Loyalist (American Revolution) =

Colonists loyal to Britain during the American Revolution

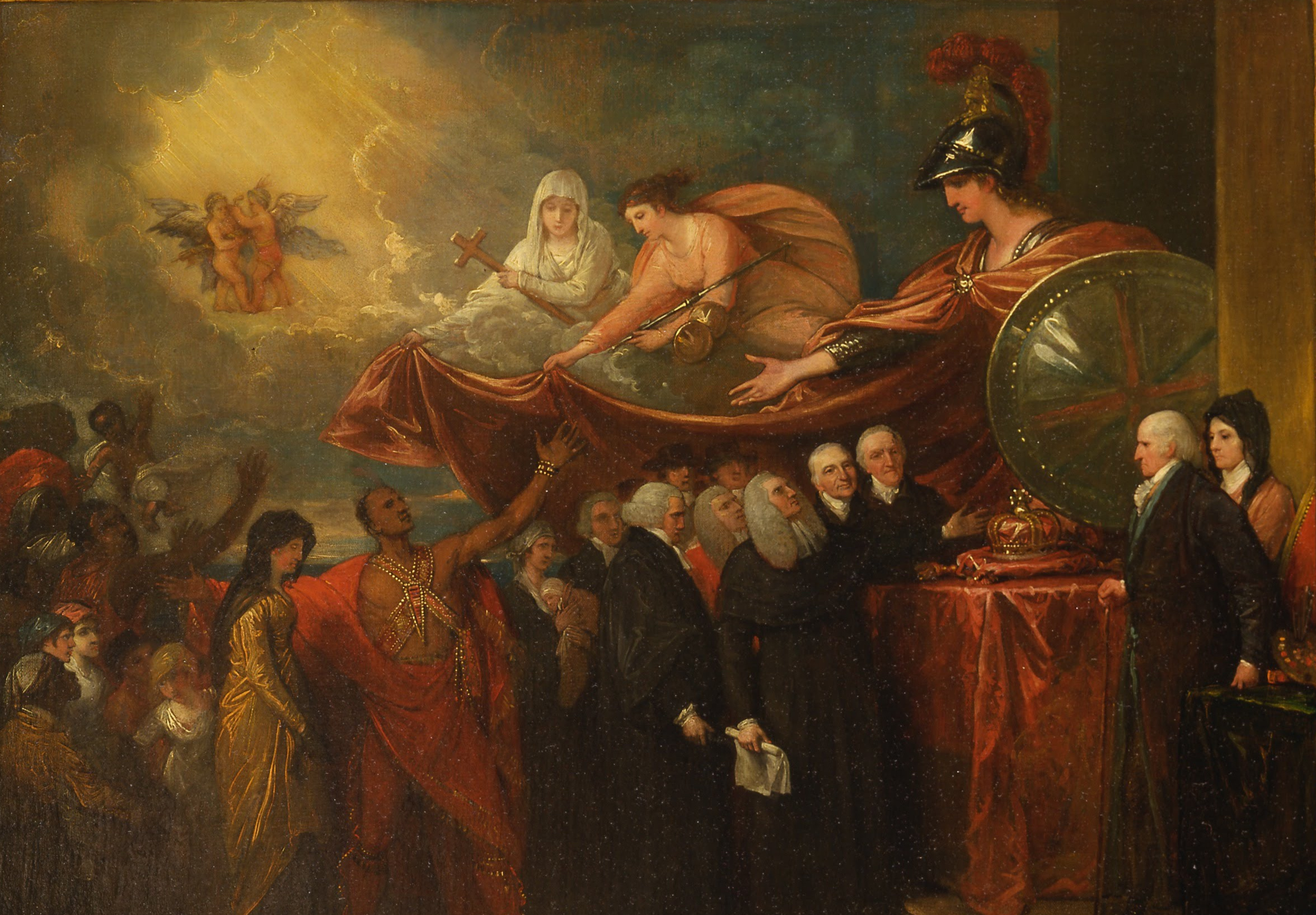
Copy of Reception of the American Loyalists by Great Britain in the Year 1783 by Benjamin West, depicting Britannia taking in exiled Loyalists

Flag of the United Empire Loyalists

Loyalists (also referred to as Tories, Royalists, or King's Men) were colonists in the Thirteen Colonies of British America who remained loyal to the British crown. Historians have estimated that between 15% and 33% of the population of the colonies were Loyalists. A 2000 researcher suggested between 15% and 20% (300,000 to 400,000) of the 2,000,000 whites in the colonies in 1775 were Loyalists, while approximately half the population avoided involvement and Patriots composed only 40 to 45 percent. The revolutionaries labelled themselves "Patriots" and portrayed Loyalists as "persons inimical to the liberties of America." Self-appointed Patriot committees of correspondence, inspection and safety published lists of suspected Loyalists and, in campaigns of terror, Patriots demonized, harassed, intimidated, burnt-out, dispossessed, raped and murdered those they claimed to be Loyalists to suppress opposition, sometimes based on little more than personal grudges or against business competitors.

The term Loyalist was coined in 1774 when political tensions rose before the outbreak of the American Revolutionary War (1775–1783). Those supporting the revolution self-identified as Patriots or Whigs.

Prominent Loyalists repeatedly assured the British government that many thousands of them would spring to arms and fight for the Crown. The British government acted in expectation of that, especially during the Southern campaigns of 1780 and 1781. However, Britain was able to protect the people only in areas where they had military control. Thus, the number of military Loyalists was significantly lower than what had been expected. Loyalist troops were often viewed with suspicion by British officers, who did not know whom they could fully trust in such a conflicted situation.

Patriots watched suspected Loyalists very closely and would not tolerate organized Loyalist opposition. Many outspoken or militarily active Loyalists were forced to flee, especially to their stronghold of New York City. William Franklin, the colonial governor of New Jersey and son of Patriot leader Benjamin Franklin, became the leader of the Loyalists after his release from a Patriot prison in 1778. He worked to build Loyalist military units to fight in the war. In 1901, Woodrow Wilson wrote:

there had been no less than twenty-five thousand loyalists enlisted in the British service during the five years of the fighting. At one time (1779) they had actually outnumbered the whole of the continental muster under the personal command of Washington.

When their cause was defeated, about 15% of the Loyalists (65,000–70,000 people) fled to other parts of the British Empire; especially to the Kingdom of Great Britain or to British North America and became known as United Empire Loyalists. Most were compensated with Canadian land or British cash distributed through formal claims procedures. The southern Loyalists moved mostly to East or West Florida or to British Caribbean possessions. Loyalists who left the US received over £3 million, or about 37% of their losses, from the British government. Loyalists who stayed in the US were generally able to retain their property and become American citizens. Many Loyalists eventually returned to the US after the war and after oppressive and discriminatory laws had been repealed.

== Background ==
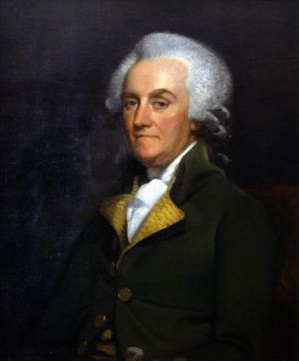
William Franklin

The American War of Independence began as a revolt, became a revolution and civil war and eventually a wider global conflict when Patriots allied with former enemies, France, Spain and the Dutch Republic. Families were often divided during the conflict, most famously Founding Father Benjamin Franklin and his son William Franklin, the last royal governor of New Jersey. Many felt themselves to be both American and British, still owing loyalty to the mother country. Maryland lawyer Daniel Dulany the Younger opposed taxation without representation but would not break his oath to the king or take up arms against him. He wrote: "There may be a time when redress may not be obtained. Till then, I shall recommend a legal, orderly, and prudent resentment". Most Americans hoped for a peaceful reconciliation but were forced to choose sides by the Patriots who took control nearly everywhere in the Thirteen Colonies in 1775–76.

== Motives for loyalism ==
In 1948, Yale historian Leonard Woods Larabee identified eight characteristics of the Loyalists that made them essentially conservative and loyal to the king and to Britain:

- They were older, better established, and resisted radical change.
- They felt that rebellion against the Crown—the legitimate government—was morally wrong. They saw themselves as "British born in the colonies" loyal to the British Empire and saw a rebellion against the metropole (Great Britain) as a betrayal of the empire. At the time, the national identity of the Americans was still in formation, and the very idea of two separate peoples (nationalities) with their own sovereign states (the Kingdom of Great Britain and the United States of America) was itself revolutionary. Eventually and gradually, as the war progressed and it became clear that the United States and Great Britain would become two separate countries, the Loyalists who remained in the United States adopted the national identity of Americans.
- They felt alienated when the Patriots (seen by them as separatists who rebelled against the Crown) resorted to violence, such as burning down houses and tarring and feathering.
- They had a moderate position but were driven to support the Crown by Patriot violence.
- They had business and family links with Britain, and being a part of the British Empire was crucial in terms of commerce and their business operations.
- They felt that independence (or at least home rule) would come in due time, but wanted it to be by a consensual process.
- They were wary that chaos, corruption, and mob rule would come about as a result of revolution.
- Some were "pessimists" who did not display the same belief in the future that the Patriots did. Others, believing the Patriot cause doomed, recalled the experiences of the Jacobites after the failure of their 1715 and 1745 rebellions, who often had their lands confiscated by the Hanoverian government.

Other motives of the Loyalists included:

- They believed in Parliamentary sovereignty and the need for a stable legal order.
- In New York, powerful families had assembled colony-wide coalitions of supporters; the de Lancey family (of Huguenot and New York Dutch ancestry) formed De Lancey's Brigade with support from its associates.
- They felt weak or threatened within American society and in need of an outside defender such as the British Crown and Parliament.
- Black Loyalists were promised freedom from slavery by both the Patriots and the British.

Both sides of the American Revolution also enlisted ex-slaves on promises of freedom and land upon success. These became known as the Black Loyalists, and most ended up after the Revolution in Nova Scotia and Sierra Leone. During the Revolution, both the Earl of Dunmore and Governor Patrick Tonyn had issued proclamations offering freedom, guaranteed refuge and a plot of land to escaped slaves for their wartime services. (See Dunmore's Proclamation and the Philipsburg Proclamation)

== Demographics ==
Historian Robert Calhoon wrote in 2000, concerning the proportion of Loyalists to Patriots in the Thirteen Colonies:

Historians' best estimates put the proportion of adult white male loyalists somewhere between 15 and 20 percent. Approximately half the colonists of European ancestry tried to avoid involvement in the struggle—some of them deliberate pacifists, others recent immigrants, and many more simple apolitical folk. The patriots received active support from perhaps 40 to 45 percent of the white populace, and at most no more than a bare majority.

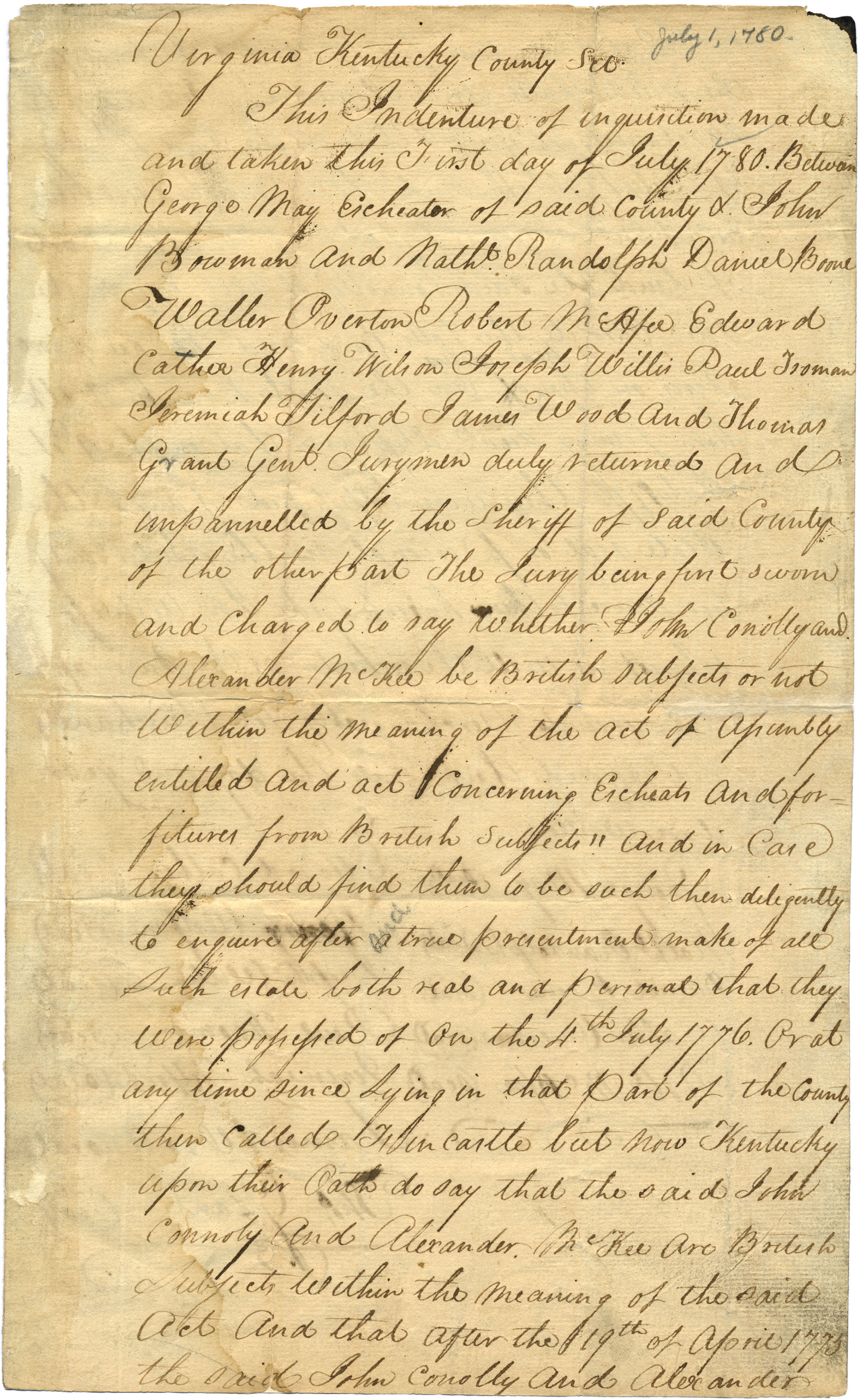
A jury finding from Kentucky County, Virginia, in July 1780, confiscating lands of two men adjudged to be British subjects. Daniel Boone was listed as a member of the jury.

Before Calhoon's work, estimates of the Loyalist share of the population were somewhat higher, at about one-third, but these estimates are now rejected as too high by most scholars. In 1968, historian Paul H. Smith estimated there were about 400,000 Loyalists, or 16% of the white population of 2.25 million in 1780.

Historian Robert Middlekauff summarizes scholarly research on the nature of Loyalist support as follows:

The largest number of loyalists were found in the middle colonies: many tenant farmers of New York supported the king, for example, as did many of the Dutch in the colony and in New Jersey. The Germans in Pennsylvania tried to stay out of the Revolution, just as many Quakers did, and when that failed, clung to the familiar connection rather than embrace the new. Highland Scots in the Carolinas, a fair number of Anglican clergy and their parishioners in Connecticut and New York, a few Presbyterians in the southern colonies, and a large number of the Iroquois stayed loyal to the king.

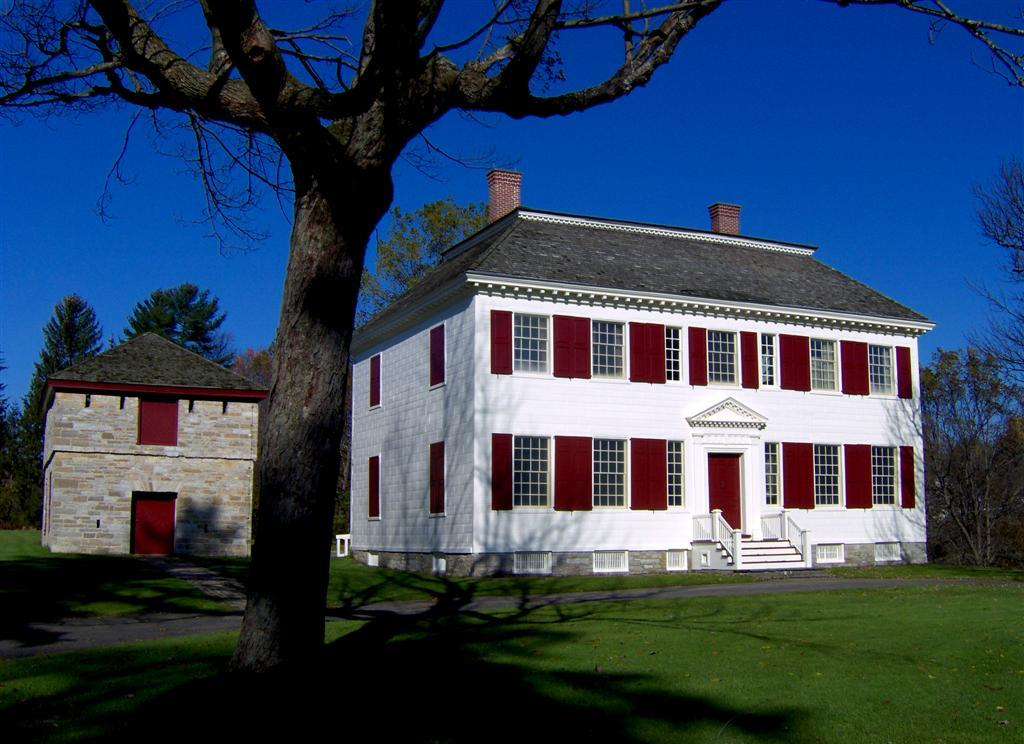
Johnson Hall, seat of Sir John Johnson in the Mohawk Valley

After the British military capture of New York City and Long Island it became the British military and political base of operations in North America from 1776 to 1783, prompting revolutionaries to flee and resulting in a large concentration of Loyalists, many of whom were refugees from other states.

According to Calhoon, Loyalists tended to be older and wealthier, but there were also many Loyalists of humble means. Many active Church of England members became Loyalists. Some recent arrivals from Britain, especially those from Scotland, had a high Loyalist proportion. Loyalists in the southern colonies were suppressed by the local Patriots, who controlled local and state government. Many people—including former Regulators in North Carolina—refused to join the rebellion, as they had earlier protested against corruption by local authorities who later became Revolutionary leaders. The oppression by the local Whigs during the Regulation led to many of the residents of backcountry North Carolina sitting out the Revolution or siding with the Loyalists.

In areas under Patriot control, Loyalists were subject to confiscation of property, and outspoken supporters of the king were threatened with public humiliation such as tarring and feathering or physical attack. It is not known how many Loyalist civilians were harassed by the Patriots, but the treatment was a warning to other Loyalists not to take up arms. In September 1775, William Drayton and Loyalist leader Colonel Thomas Fletchall signed a treaty of neutrality in the interior community of Ninety Six, South Carolina. For actively aiding the British army when it occupied Philadelphia, two residents of the city were tried for treason, convicted, and executed by returning Patriot forces.

=== Black Loyalists ===
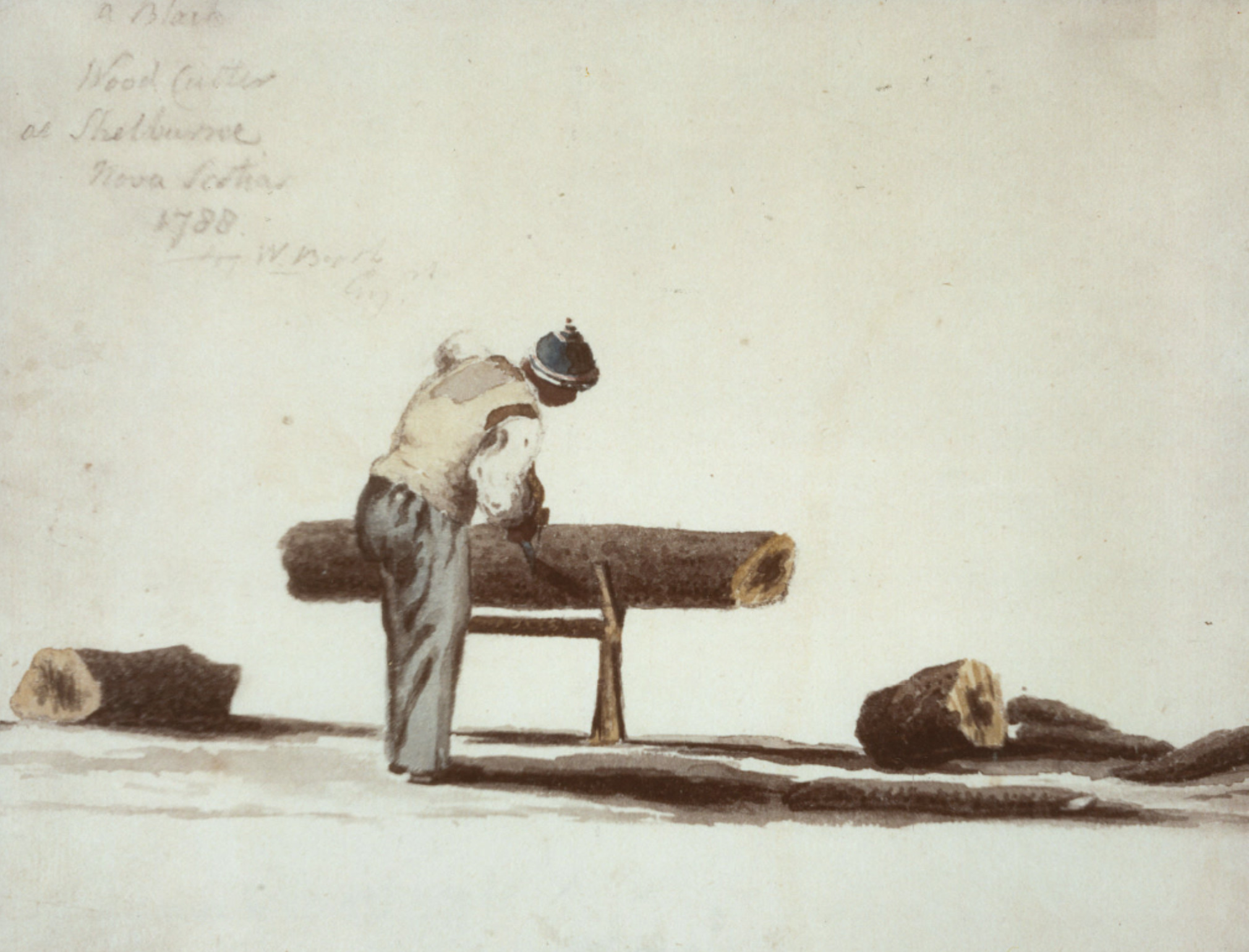
1788 illustration of a Black woodcutter in Shelburne, Nova Scotia

As a result of the looming crisis in 1775, Royal Governor of Virginia Lord Dunmore issued a proclamation that promised freedom to indentured servants and slaves who were able to bear arms and join his Loyalist Ethiopian Regiment. Many of the slaves in the South joined the Loyalists with the intention of gaining freedom and escaping the South. African-Americans were often the first to come forward to volunteer, and a total of 12,000 African Americans served with the British from 1775 to 1783. This forced the Patriots to also offer freedom to those who would serve in the Continental Army, with thousands of Black Patriots serving.

=== Women ===
While men were out fighting for the Crown, women served at home protecting their land and property. At the end of the war, many Loyalist men left America for the shelter of England, leaving their wives and daughters to protect their land. The main punishment for Loyalist families was the expropriation of property, but married women were protected under "feme covert", which meant that they had no political identity and their legal rights were absorbed by their husbands. This created an awkward dilemma for the confiscation committees: confiscating the land of such a woman would punish her for her husband's actions. In many cases, the women did not get a choice on if they were labeled a Loyalist or a Patriot; the label was dependent on their husband's political association. However, some women showed their loyalty to the Crown by continually purchasing British goods, writing it down, and showing resistance to the Patriots. Grace Growden Galloway recorded the experience in her diary. Her writings show the difficulties that her family faced during the revolution. Galloway's property was seized by the Patriots, and she spent the rest of her life fighting to regain it. It was returned to her heirs in 1783, after she and her husband had died.

The Patriots allowed women to become involved in politics on a larger scale than the Loyalists. Some women involved in political activity include Catharine Macaulay and Mercy Otis Warren, who were both writers. Both women maintained a 20-year friendship, although they wrote about different sides of the war; Macaulay wrote from a Loyalist British perspective, whereas Warren wrote about her support for the American Revolution. Macaulay's work include History of England and Warren wrote History of the Rise, Progress, and Termination of the American Revolution. Although both women's works were unpopular during this time, they pushed them to learn from social critique.

=== Canada and Nova Scotia ===
Loyalist refugees on their way to Canada

Patriot agents were active in Quebec (which was then frequently called "Canada", the name of the earlier French province) in the months leading to the outbreak of active hostilities. John Brown, an agent of the Boston Committee of Correspondence, worked with Canadian merchant Thomas Walker and other Patriot sympathisers during the winter of 1774–75 to convince inhabitants to support the actions of the First Continental Congress. However, many of Quebec's inhabitants remained neutral, resisting service to either the British or the Americans.

Although some Canadians took up arms in support of the revolution, the majority remained loyal to the king. French Canadians had been satisfied by the British government's Quebec Act of 1774, which offered religious and linguistic toleration; in general, they did not sympathize with a revolution that they saw as being led by Protestants from New England, who were their commercial rivals and hereditary enemies. Most of the English-speaking settlers had arrived following the British conquest of Canada in 1759–60 and were unlikely to support separation from Britain. The older British colonies, Newfoundland and Nova Scotia (including what is now New Brunswick), also remained loyal and contributed military forces in support of the Crown.

In late 1775, the Continental Army sent a force into Quebec, led by General Richard Montgomery and Colonel Benedict Arnold, to convince the residents of Quebec to join the revolution. Although only a minority of Canadians openly expressed loyalty to King George, about 1,500 militia fought for the king in the siege of Fort St. Jean. In the region south of Montreal, which was occupied by the Continentals, some inhabitants supported the revolution and raised two regiments to join the Patriot forces.

In Nova Scotia, there were many Yankee settlers originally from New England, and they generally supported the principles of the revolution. The allegiance toward the revolution waned as American privateers raided Nova Scotia communities throughout the war. The Nova Scotia government used the law to convict people for sedition and treason for supporting the Patriot cause. There was also the influence of an influx of recent immigration from the British Isles, and they remained neutral during the war; the influx was greatest in Halifax. Britain, in any case, built up powerful forces at the naval base of Halifax after the failure of Jonathan Eddy to capture Fort Cumberland in 1776.

== Military operations ==
The Loyalists rarely attempted any political organization. They were often passive unless regular British army units were in the area. The British, however, assumed a highly activist Loyalist community was ready to mobilize and planned much of their strategy around raising Loyalist regiments. The British provincial line, consisting of Americans enlisted on a regular army status, enrolled 19,000 Loyalists (50 units and 312 companies). The maximum strength of the Loyalist provincial line was 9,700 in December 1780. In all, about 19,000 at one time or another were soldiers or militia in British forces.

In the opening months of the Revolutionary War, the Patriots laid siege to Boston, where most of the British forces were stationed. Elsewhere, there were few British troops, and the Patriots seized control of all levels of government, as well as supplies of arms and gunpowder. Vocal Loyalists recruited people to their side, often with the encouragement and assistance of royal governors. In the South Carolina backcountry, Loyalist recruitment outstripped that of Patriots. A brief siege at Ninety Six, South Carolina in the fall of 1775 was followed by a rapid rise in Patriot recruiting. In what became known as the Snow Campaign, partisan militia arrested or drove out most of the backcountry Loyalist leadership. North Carolina backcountry Scots and former Regulators joined forces in early 1776, but they were broken as a force at the Battle of Moore's Creek Bridge. Loyalists from South Carolina fought for the British in the Battle of Camden. The British forces at the Battle of Monck's Corner and the Battle of Lenud's Ferry consisted entirely of Loyalists except their commanding officer Banastre Tarleton. Both white and black Loyalists fought for the British at the Battle of Kemp's Landing in Virginia.

By July 4, 1776, the Patriots had gained control of virtually all territory in the Thirteen Colonies and had expelled all royal officials. No one who openly proclaimed their loyalty to the Crown was allowed to remain, so Loyalists fled or kept quiet. Some of those who remained later gave aid to invading British armies or joined uniformed Loyalist regiments. The British were forced out of Boston by March 17, 1776. They regrouped at Halifax and attacked New York in August, defeating George Washington's army at Long Island and capturing New York City and its vicinity, and they occupied the mouth of the Hudson River until 1783. British forces seized control of other cities, including Philadelphia (1777), Savannah, Georgia (1778–83), and Charleston, South Carolina (1780–82). But 90% of the colonial population lived outside the cities, with the effective result that Congress represented 80 to 90 percent of the population. The British removed their governors from colonies where the Patriots were in control, but Loyalist civilian government was re-established in coastal Georgia from 1779 to 1782, despite the presence of Patriot forces in the northern part of Georgia. Essentially, the British were only able to maintain power in areas where they had a strong military presence.

Black Loyalists helped rout the Virginia militia at the Battle of Kemp's Landing and fought in the Battle of Great Bridge on the Elizabeth River, wearing the motto "Liberty to Slaves", but this time they were defeated. The remnants of their regiment were then involved in the evacuation of Norfolk, after which they served in the Chesapeake area. Eventually, the camp that they had set up there suffered an outbreak of smallpox and other diseases. This took a heavy toll, putting many of them out of action for some time. The survivors joined other Loyalist units and continued to serve throughout the war.

In Canada, although the Continentals captured Montreal in November 1775, they were turned back a month later at Quebec City by a combination of the British military under Governor Guy Carleton, the difficult terrain and weather, and an indifferent local response. The Continental forces would be driven from Quebec in 1776, after the breakup of ice on the St. Lawrence River and the arrival of British transports in May and June. There would be no further serious attempt to challenge British control of present-day Canada until the War of 1812. In 1777, 1,500 Loyalist militia took part in the Saratoga campaign in New York, and surrendered with General Burgoyne after the Battles of Saratoga in October. For the rest of the war, Quebec acted as a base for raiding expeditions, conducted primarily by Loyalists and Indians, against frontier communities.

== Aftermath of the American Revolution ==
=== Emigration ===
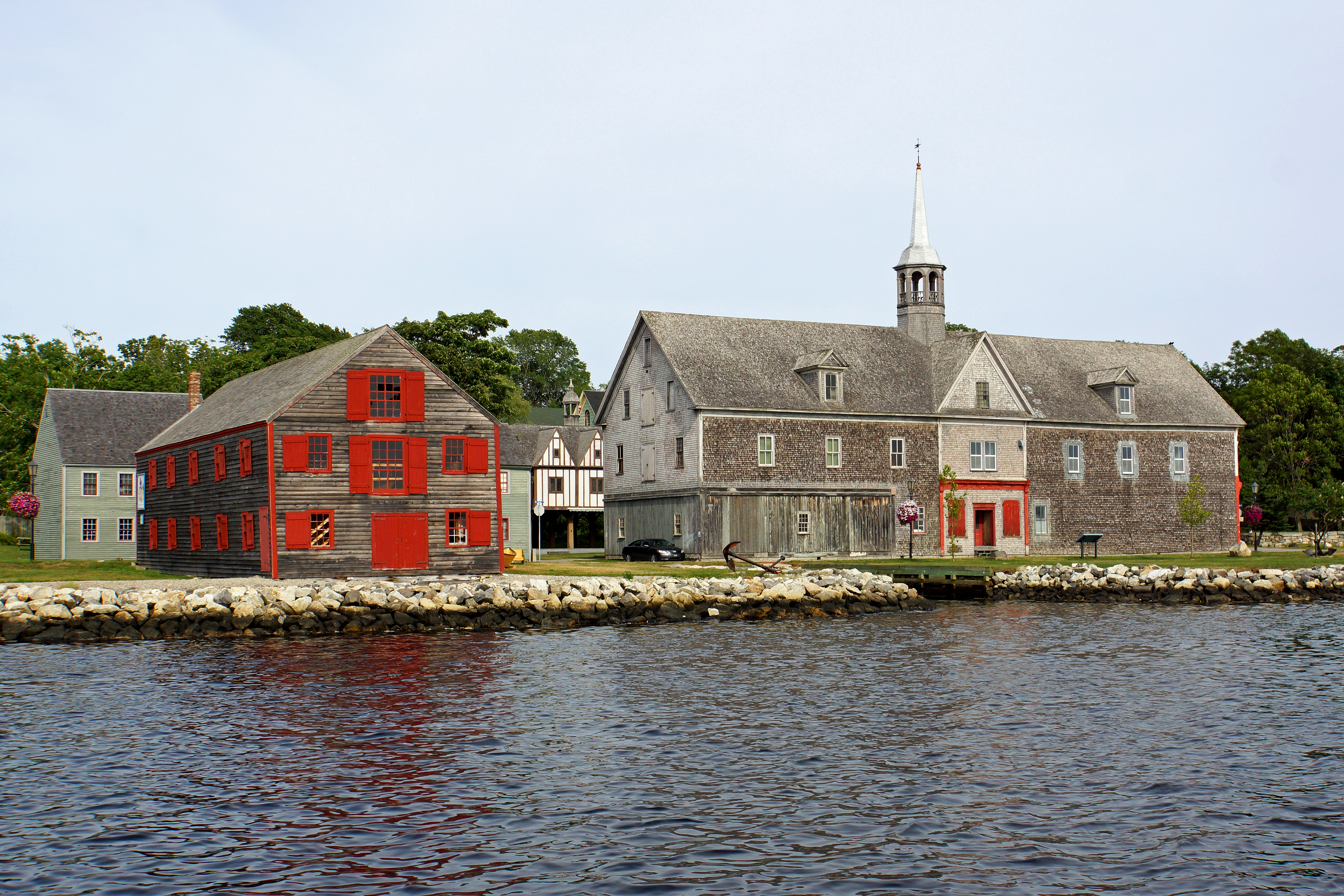
Shelburne, Nova Scotia, a major early destination of Loyalist refugees

Estimates for how many Loyalists emigrated after the war differ. Historian Maya Jasanoff calculates that 60,000 in total went to British North America, including about 50,000 whites. Philip Ranlet estimates 20,000 adult white Loyalists went to Canada, while Wallace Brown cites about 80,000 Loyalists in total permanently left the United States.

According to Jasanoff, about 36,000 Loyalists went to New Brunswick and Nova Scotia, while about 6,600 went to Quebec and 2,000 to Prince Edward Island. About 5,090 white Loyalists went to Florida, bringing along their slaves who numbered about 8,285 (421 whites and 2,561 blacks returned to the US from Florida). When Florida was returned to Spain, however, very few Loyalists remained there. Approximately 6,000 whites went to Jamaica and other Caribbean islands, notably the Bahamas Islands, and about 13,000 went to Britain (including 5,000 free blacks).

A precise figure cannot be known because the records were incomplete and inaccurate, and small numbers continued to leave after 1783. The 50,000 or so white departures represented about 10% of the Loyalists (at 20–25% of the white population). Loyalists (especially soldiers and former officials) could choose evacuation. Loyalists whose roots were not yet deeply embedded in the United States were more likely to leave; older people who had familial bonds and had acquired friends, property, and a degree of social respectability were more likely to remain in the US. The vast majority of the half-million white Loyalists, about 20–25% of the total number of whites, remained in the US. Starting in the mid-1780s, a small percentage of those who had left returned to the United States. The exiles amounted to about 2% of the total US population of 3 million at the end of the war in 1783.

After 1783, some former Loyalists, especially Germans from Pennsylvania, immigrated to Canada to take advantage of the British government's offer of free land. Many departed the fledgling United States because they faced continuing hostility. In another migration—motivated mainly by economic rather than political reasons—more than 20,000 and perhaps as many as 30,000 "Late Loyalists" arrived in Ontario in the 1790s, attracted by Lieutenant-Governor Simcoe's policy of land and low taxes, one-fifth those in the US.

The 36,000 or so who went to Nova Scotia were not well received by the 17,000 Nova Scotians, who were mostly descendants of New Englanders settled there before the Revolution. "They [the Loyalists]", Colonel Thomas Dundas wrote in 1786, "have experienced every possible injury from the old inhabitants of Nova Scotia, who are even more disaffected towards the British Government than any of the new States ever were. This makes me doubt their remaining long dependent." In response, the colony of New Brunswick, until 1784 part of Nova Scotia, was created for the 14,000 who had settled in those parts. Of the 46,000 who went to Canada, 10,000 went to Quebec, especially what is now modern-day Ontario, the rest to Nova Scotia and Prince Edward Island.

Realizing the importance of some type of consideration, on November 9, 1789, Governor of Quebec Lord Dorchester declared that it was his wish to "put the mark of Honour upon the Families who had adhered to the Unity of the Empire." As a result of Dorchester's statement, the printed militia rolls carried the notation:

Those Loyalists who have adhered to the Unity of the Empire, and joined the Royal Standard before the Treaty of Separation in the year 1783, and all their Children and their Descendants by either sex, are to be distinguished by the following Capitals, affixed to their names: U.E. Alluding to their great principle The Unity of the Empire.

The post-nominals "U.E." are rarely seen today, but the influence of the Loyalists on the evolution of Canada remains. Their ties to Britain and/or their antipathy to the United States provided the strength needed to keep Canada independent and distinct in North America. The Loyalists' basic distrust of republicanism and "mob rule" influenced Canada's gradual path to independence. The new British North American provinces of Upper Canada (the forerunner of Ontario) and New Brunswick were founded as places of refuge for the United Empire Loyalists.

In an interesting historical twist, Peter Matthews, a son of Loyalists, participated in the Upper Canada Rebellion, which sought relief from oligarchic British colonial government and pursued American-style republicanism. He was arrested, tried, and executed in Toronto, and later became heralded as a patriot to the movement which led to Canadian self-governance.

The wealthiest and most prominent Loyalist exiles went to Great Britain to rebuild their careers; many received pensions. Many Southern Loyalists, taking along their slaves, went to the West Indies, particularly to the Abaco Islands in the Bahamas. Certain Loyalists who fled the United States brought their slaves with them to Canada (mostly to areas that later became Ontario and New Brunswick), where slavery was legal. An imperial law in 1790 assured prospective immigrants to Canada that their slaves would remain their property. However, a law enacted by eminent British lieutenant general and founder of modern Toronto John Graves Simcoe in 1793 entitled the Act Against Slavery tried to suppress slavery in Upper Canada by halting the sale of slaves to the United States, and by freeing slaves upon their escape from the latter into Canada. Simcoe desired to demonstrate the merits of loyalism and abolitionism in Upper Canada in contrast to the nascent republicanism and prominence of slavery in the United States, and, according to historian Stanley R. Mealing:

...he had not only the most articulate faith in its imperial destiny but also the most sympathetic appreciation of the interests and aspirations of its inhabitants.

However, the actual law was a compromise. According to historian Afua Cooper, Simcoe's law required children in slavery to be freed when they reached age 25 and:

forbade the importation of slaves but, to Simcoe's disappointment, did not grant freedom to adult slaves. Having not been freed by the act, many Canadian slaves fled across the border into the Old Northwest Territory, where slavery had been abolished.

Thousands of Iroquois and other Native Americans were expelled from New York and other states and resettled in Canada. The descendants of one such group of Iroquois, led by Joseph Brant (Thayendenegea), settled at Six Nations of the Grand River, the largest First Nations reserve in Canada. (The remainder, under the leadership of Cornplanter (John Abeel) and members of his family, stayed in New York.) A group of African-American Loyalists settled in Nova Scotia but immigrated again to Sierra Leone after facing discrimination there.

Many of the Loyalists were forced to abandon substantial properties to American restoration or compensation for these lost properties, which was a major issue during the negotiation of the Jay Treaty in 1794. Two successive boards were formed, and under a new convention signed in 1802 by the United States and Great Britain for the mutual payment of claims, the US paid the sum of £600,000, while only £1,420,000 of nearly £5 million in claims considered by commissioners in Britain were judged to be good.

For the Black Loyalists, the British honored the pledge of freedom in New York City through the efforts of General Guy Carleton, who recorded the names of African Americans who had supported the British in a document called the Book of Negroes, which granted freedom to slaves who had escaped and assisted the British. About 4,000 Black Loyalists went to the British colonies of Nova Scotia and New Brunswick, where they were promised land grants. They founded communities across the two provinces, many of which still exist today. Over 2,500 settled in Birchtown, Nova Scotia, instantly making it the largest free black community in North America. James Matra, hatched a plan in 1783 for Black Loyalists to be transported to create a new colony at Botany Bay, Australia discovered a decade earlier by Captain James Cook. This project had the favour of the British Home Office for many years, but ended up with the new infant colony of Sydney being settled mainly by British convicts.

However, the long period of waiting time to be officially given land grants that were given to them and the prejudices of white Loyalists in nearby Shelburne who regularly harassed the settlement in events such as the Shelburne riots in 1784, made life very difficult for the community. In 1791 the Sierra Leone Company offered to transport dissatisfied black Loyalists to the nascent colony of Sierra Leone in West Africa, with the promise of better land and more equality. About 1,200 left Nova Scotia for Sierra Leone, where they named the capital Freetown. After 1787 they became Sierra Leone's ruling elite during the colonial era and their descendants, the Sierra Leone Creoles, are the cultural elites of the nation. About 400 to 1,000 free blacks who joined the British side in the Revolution went to London and joined the free black community of about 10,000 there.

=== United States citizens ===
The great majority of Loyalists never left the United States; they stayed on and were allowed to be citizens of the new country, retaining for a time the earlier designation of "Tories". Some became nationally prominent leaders, including Samuel Seabury, who was the first Bishop of the Episcopal Church, and Tench Coxe. There was a small but significant trickle of returnees who found life in Nova Scotia and New Brunswick too difficult. Perhaps 10% of the refugees to New Brunswick returned to the States as did an unknown number from Nova Scotia. Some Massachusetts Tories settled in the Maine District. Nevertheless, the vast majority never returned. Captain Benjamin Hallowell, who, as Mandamus Councilor in Massachusetts, served as the direct representative of the Crown, was considered by the insurgents as one of the most hated men in the Colony, but as a token of compensation, when he returned from England in 1796, his son was allowed to regain the family house.

In many states, moderate Whigs, who had not been in favor of separation from Britain but preferred a negotiated settlement that would have maintained ties to the Mother Country, aligned with Tories to block radicals. Among these was Alexander Hamilton in 1782–85, to wrest control of New York State from the faction of the George Clinton. Most states had rescinded anti-Tory laws by 1787, although the accusation of being a Tory was heard for another generation. Several hundred who had left for Florida returned to Georgia in 1783–84.

South Carolina, which had seen a bitter, bloody internal civil war in 1780–82, adopted a policy of reconciliation that proved more moderate than any other state. About 4,500 white Loyalists left when the war ended, but the majority remained. The state government successfully and quickly reincorporated the vast majority. During the war, pardons were offered to Loyalists who switched sides and joined the Patriot forces. Others were required to pay a 10% fine of the value of the property. The legislature named 232 Loyalists liable for the confiscation of their property, but most appealed and were forgiven.

In Connecticut, much to the disgust of the radical Whigs, the moderate Whigs were advertising in New York newspapers in 1782–83 that Tories who would make no trouble would be welcome because their skills and money would help the state's economy. The moderates prevailed; all anti-Tory laws were repealed in early 1783 except for the law relating to confiscated Tory estates: "... the problem of the loyalists after 1783 was resolved in their favor after the War of Independence ended." In 1787, the last of any discriminatory laws was rescinded.

=== Effect of the departure of Loyalist leaders ===
The departure of so many royal officials, rich merchants, and landed gentry destroyed the hierarchical networks that had dominated most of the colonies. A major result was that a Patriot/Whig elite supplanted royal officials and affluent Tories. In New York, the departure of key members of the De Lancey, De Peyster, Walton, and Cruger families undercut the interlocking families that largely owned and controlled the Hudson Valley. Likewise, in Pennsylvania, the departure of powerful families—Penn, Allen, Chew, Shippen—destroyed the cohesion of the old upper class there. Massachusetts passed an act banishing 46 Boston merchants in 1778, including members of some of Boston's wealthiest families. The departure of families such as the Ervings, Winslows, Clarks, and Lloyds, hitherto leaders of networks of family and clients, opened opportunities for other leadership to emerge. The bases of the men who replaced them were much different. One rich Patriot in Boston noted in 1779 that "fellows who would have cleaned my shoes five years ago, have amassed fortunes and are riding in chariots." New men became rich merchants, but they shared a spirit of republican equality that replaced the former elitism.

The Patriots' reliance on Catholic France for military, financial, and diplomatic aid led to a sharp drop in anti-Catholic rhetoric. For the Patriots, the king replaced the pope as the demon they fought. Anti-Catholicism remained strong among Loyalists; support for the monarch, head of the Church of England, meant hostility to Catholicism. By the 1780s, Catholics were extended legal toleration in all of the New England states that previously had been so hostile. "In the midst of war and crisis, New Englanders gave up not only their allegiance to Britain but one of their most dearly held prejudices."

== Media ==
- John Singleton Copley painted many prominent Loyalists and produced an oil-on-canvas depiction of a soldier wearing the uniform of the Royal Ethiopian Regiment in The Death of Major Pierson (1784).
- Benjamin West characterized the ethnic and economic diversity of the Loyalists in his Reception of the American Loyalists by Great Britain in the Year 1783. The original painting was lost, but a smaller version of it can be seen in the background of West's portrait of John Eardley Wilmot.
- Gilbert Stuart painted a portrait of James DeLancey around 1785. It stays in the collection of the Metropolitan Museum of Art, a bequest of his descendant George DeLancey Harris Jr. of New York City and Annapolis Royal, Nova Scotia.
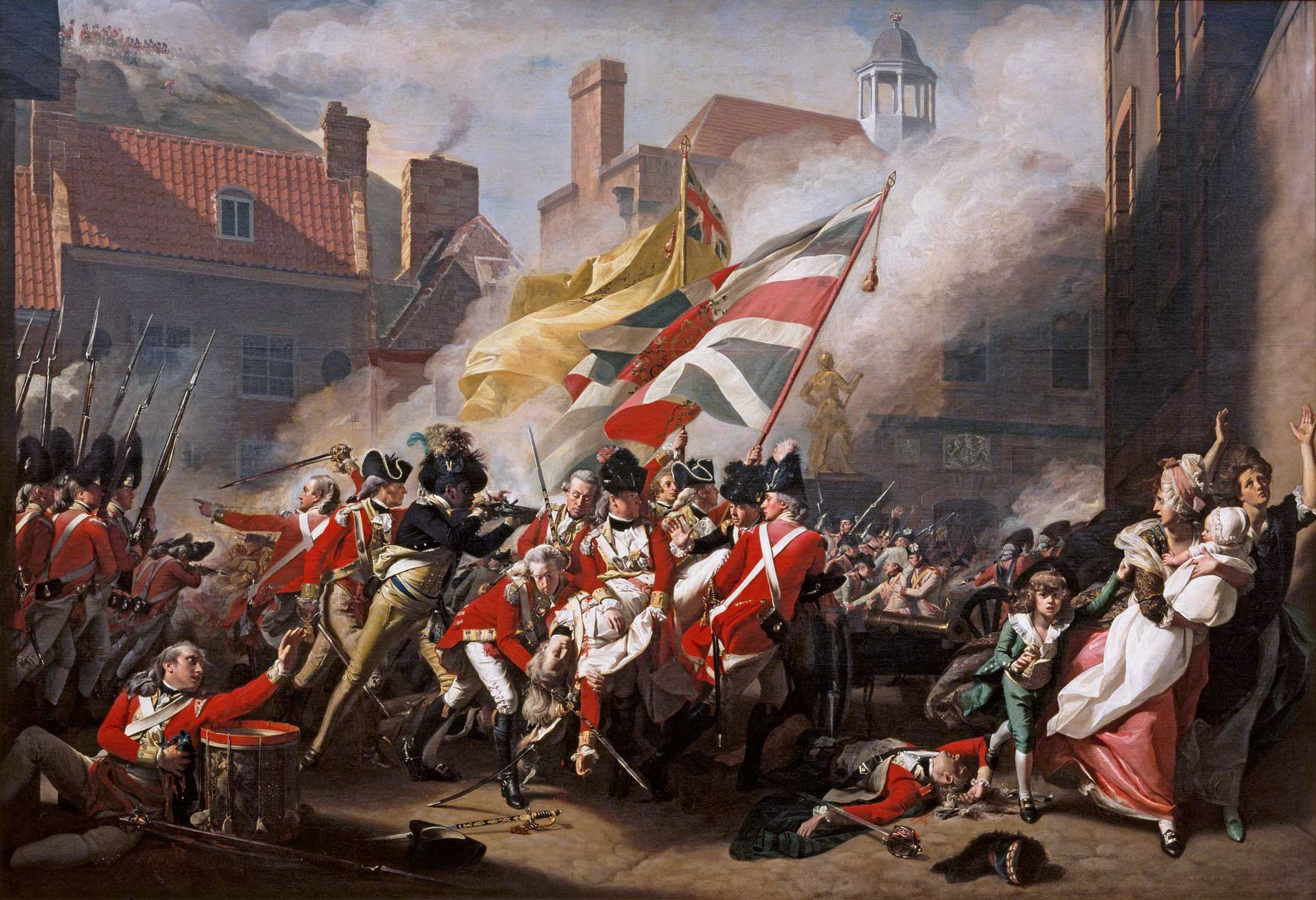
John Copley's The Death of Major Pierson

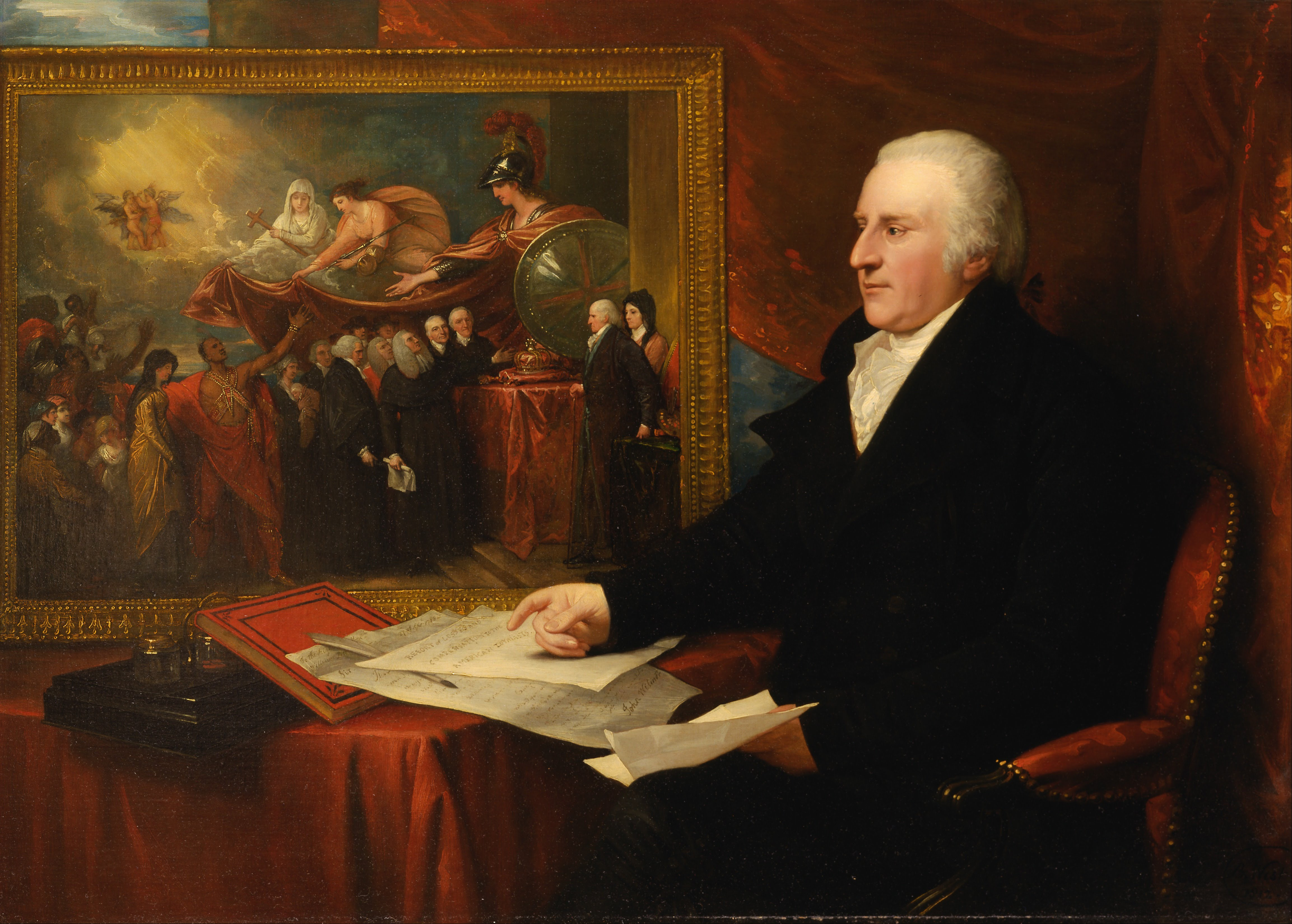
Benjamin West's Reception as a detail of John Eardley Wilmot
- The Adventures of Jonathan Corncob, Loyal American Refugee (1787) by Jonathan Corncob. According to Maya Jasanoff, "traveling to London to file a claim served as the opening gambit" for this "picaresque novel about the American Revolution".
- "Rip Van Winkle" (1819), short story by Washington Irving
- The Spy: a Tale of the Neutral Ground (1821), novel by James Fenimore Cooper
- Oliver Wiswell (1940), a novel by Kenneth Roberts
- Downie, Mary Alice; Downie, John (1971). Honor Bound. illus. Joan Huffman. Toronto: Oxford University Press. ISBN 0-19-540192-1.
- The Book of Negroes (2007) by Lawrence Hill
- The Fort (2010), novel by Bernard Cornwell
- Long Stanley, Wendy (2019). The Power to Deny: A Woman of the Revolution Novel. Carmenta Publishing. ISBN 978-1-951747-00-8. Well received historical fiction account of the life of Elizabeth Graeme Fergusson
- The Domination, a dystopian science fiction alternate history series by S.M. Stirling, is premised on the resettlement of Loyalists in the Cape Colony.

== Notable people ==
- Benedict Arnold, Patriot turned British general
- Jonathan Boucher, Anglican priest in Maryland
- Thomas Brown, Georgia planter, officer in the King's Carolina Rangers
- William Franklin, son of Benjamin Franklin
- Joseph Galloway, speaker of the Pennsylvania Assembly; author of the Galloway Plan of Union 1774
- Charles Inglis, Anglican priest, published a response to Common Sense
- Thomas Hutcinson, royal governor of Massachusetts
- Boston King, former slave, Black Loyalist
- Peter Oliver, chief justice of the Massachusetts Supreme Court

== See also ==
- Monarchism in the United States
- American Revolution – Nova Scotia theatre
- Neutral Ground of Westchester County in the Revolutionary War
- List of places named for Loyalists (American Revolution)
- Frederick Haldimand (1718–1791), while serving in Canada, amassed a huge collection filling 115 microfilm reels of documents, letters, etc. reflecting the Loyalist experience in Canada. A partial finding aid to this collection may be found on the Queens University Archives website.
- Godfrey–Milliken Bill, proposed Canadian law demanding compensation from the US for Loyalist claims after its independence.
- Lorenzo Sabine (1803–1877), early historian and chronicler of the Loyalist experience
- Martin v. Hunter's Lessee
- Maryland Loyalists Battalion
- Southern Unionists, Southerners loyal to the Union during the American Civil War
