= Shippen =

Shippen can refer to:

== People ==
- Edward Shippen, second mayor of Philadelphia
- Edward Shippen (II), wealthy merchant and government official in colonial Philadelphia
- Edward Shippen (III), lawyer, judge, government official, and prominent figure in colonial and post-revolutionary Philadelphia
- John Shippen, African-American golfer
- Peggy Shippen, second wife of Benedict Arnold
- Robert Shippen, English academic administrator at the University of Oxford
- William Shippen Sr., represented Pennsylvania in the Continental Congress
- William Shippen, Jr., the second Surgeon General of the Continental Army
- William Shippen (MP), English Tory Member of Parliament

== Places ==
- Shippen Township, Cameron County, Pennsylvania
- Shippen Township, Tioga County, Pennsylvania
