= Edward Shippen (disambiguation) =

Edward Shippen is the name of:

- Edward Shippen (1639–1712), second mayor of Philadelphia
- Edward Shippen III (1703–1781), 33rd mayor of Philadelphia and Edward Shippen's grandson
- Edward Shippen IV (1729–1808), Chief Justice of the Supreme Court of Pennsylvania and son of Edward Shippen III
- Edward Shippen Barnes (1887–1958), American organist
