= Ben Trott =

Ben Trott may refer to:

- Benjamin Trott (painter) (c.1770–1843), American portrait miniaturist
- Benjamin Trott (born 1977), chief technical officer of Six Apart
- Ben Trott (cricketer) (born 1975), cricketer
