= Christoph Wilhelm von Koch =

French politician, diplomat (1737–1813)

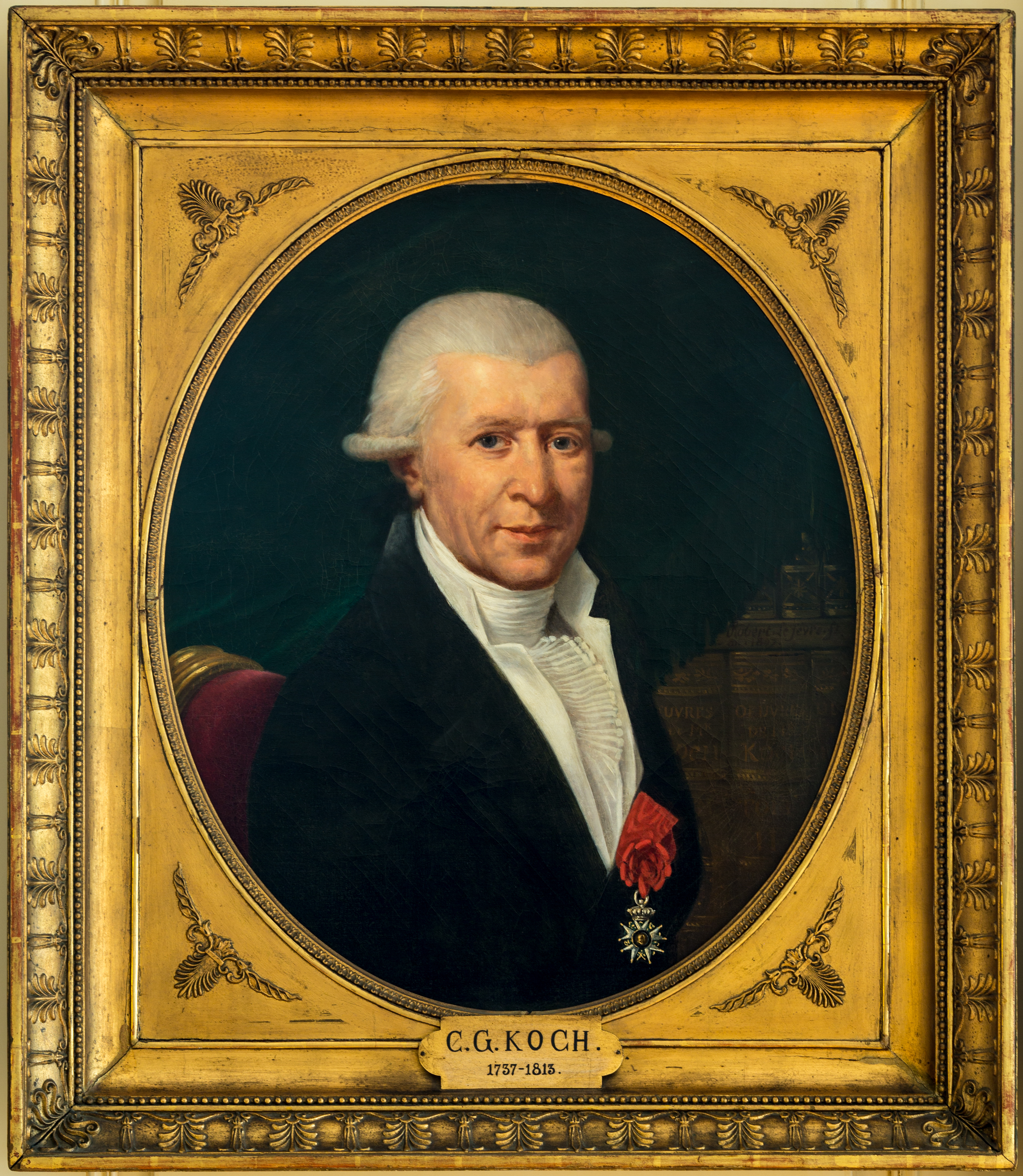
Christoph Wilhelm Koch (Oil painting, presently owned by the diocese of St. Thomas, Strasbourg)

Christoph Wilhelm von Koch (French: Christophe-Guillaume Koch; 9 May 1737 – 25 October 1813, Strasbourg; from 1777 Edler von Koch) was a Protestant diplomat, politician, librarian and writer from Alsace, who also taught constitutional law and history. His pupils included Johann Wolfgang von Goethe, Maximilian von Montgelas, Klemens von Metternich and Louis-Guillaume Otto.

== Early life ==
Born in Bouxwiller in Alsace on 9 May 1737, the eighth of eleven children to councillor Johann Reinhard and his wife Susanna Felischmann, he attended the local school there before his parents moved to Strasbourg in 1750, where he spent two years at the Protestant school. He then enrolled to study philosophy at the University of Strasbourg. He spent time studying history, encouraged by the teacher Johann Daniel Schöpflin. After three years he transferred to the law department and in June 1759 he graduated as a licenciate in law. In mid-1762 he defended his thesis "De collatione dignitatum et beneficiorum ecclesiasticorum" which had to do with disputes in church law. In the same year he went to Paris where he stayed with his uncle, improved his command of the French language, visited Paris libraries and came in contact with French liberal intellectuals. Many of his later publications were in French.

== Academic life ==
On returning to Strasbourg he helped Schöpflin to prepare "Alsatia diplomatica", and became assistant to Schöpflin when Andreas Lamey (1726–1802) moved to Mannheim. This was the springboard for Koch's academic career in history and public law. Koch's father had died in 1755 and when Koch's mother also died, in 1767, Koch was taken in as part of the Schöpflin household, where he stayed until Schöpflin's death in 1771. In 1772 he was given a lecturership to the university. In his will, Schöpflin had endowed the city of Strasbourg with his library and Koch also became the librarian. In 1773 Koch was awarded the title of doctor of philosophy for his services to teaching and in 1776 the title of doctor of laws. In 1777, together with his oldest and youngest brothers, he was raised to the peerage by Kaiser Joseph II. He declined a lucrative offer to move to the University of Göttingen. Travelling extensively in Germany, France, Switzerland and the Netherlands, he gained access to libraries and archives and made contact with intellectuals and prominent public figures.

In 1780 he published his "Tables généalogiques des maisons souveraines de l'Europe" on the family trees of European monarchs and in 1790 he published the two-volume "Tableau des révolutions de l'Europe dans le moyen âge" on political upheavals in the European Middle Ages.

== French Revolution ==
The French Revolution of 1789 tore Koch temporarily away from teaching and writing. As leader of the diplomatic mission to Paris, he successfully argued for the protection of Alsacian Protestant property against appropriation by the state, citing the treaties of the Peace of Westphalia of 1648. Trusted by the French, he became a member of the French Assemblée nationale in 1791 and, back in Strasbourg, he was incarcerated for several months during the Jacobin Terror. In 1796 his encyclopaedic "Abrégé de l'histoir des traités de paix entre les puissances de l'Europe" appeared cataloguing all of the peace treaties between the major central European powers since the Treaties of Westphalia in 1648. In 1804 he was appointed member of the Legion of Honour by Napoleon Bonaparte, attending Napoleon's coronation later that year. Koch served on the French Napoleonic Tribunat council from 1802 until its dissolution in 1807, applying himself among other things to re-establishing the Protestant university in Strasbourg.

== Later life ==
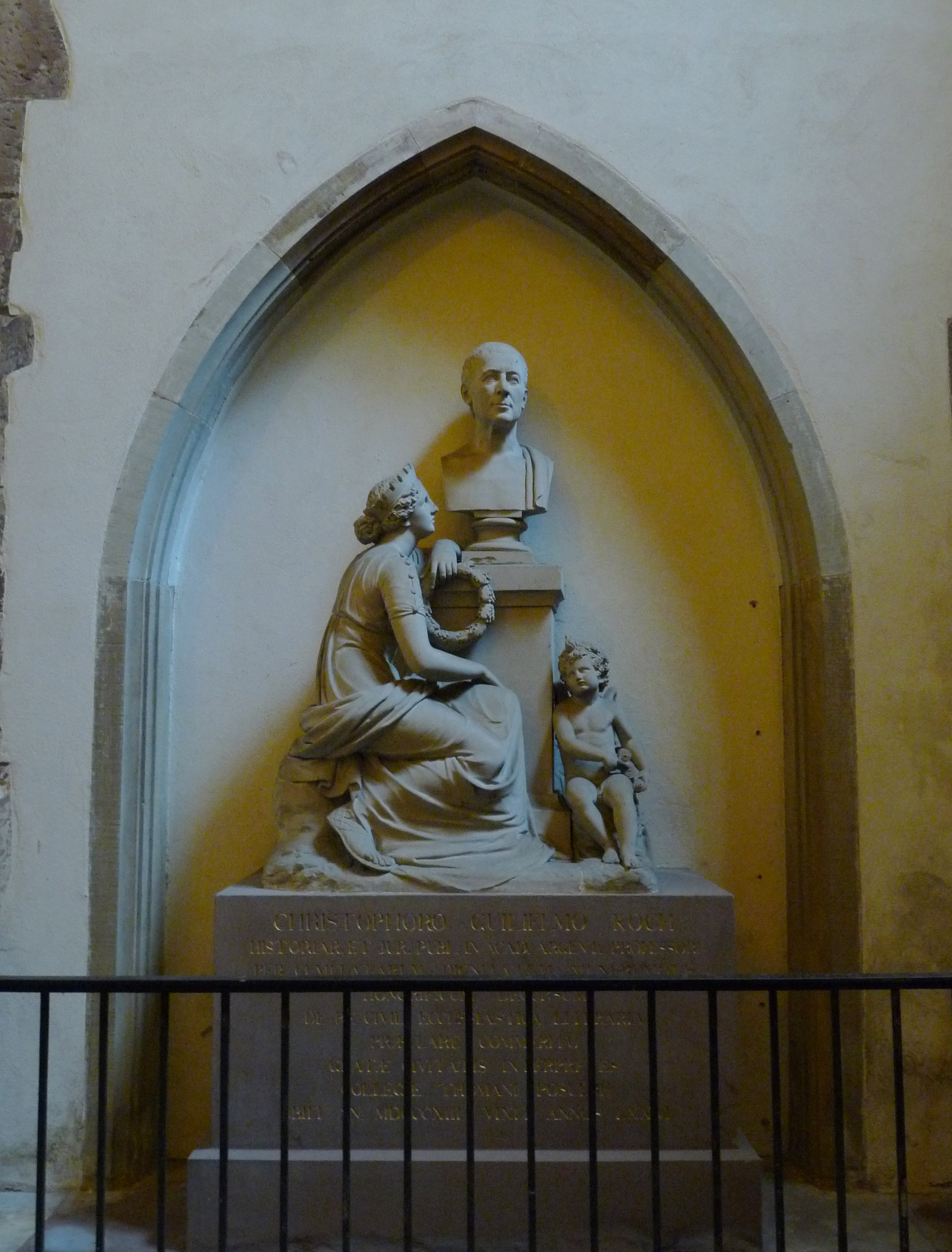
Memorial in St. Thomas, Strasbourg by Landolin Ohmacht

His later years were devoted to writing, university teaching and to his membership of scholarly societies. In 1809 he became Dean of the St Thomas Seminary in Strasbourg and in 1810 a board member of the Assembly of Augsburg Confession Churches. In summer 1813 he fell ill and died on 24 October that year, five days after the Battle of Leipzig, aged 76. He never married. His neo-classical memorial is in St Thomas's Church, Strasbourg. It was designed by Landolin Ohmacht and constructed in 1816, three years after Koch's death. The city's archivist and historian, Louis Schneegans (1812–1858), described it:

At the base, on a kind of altar, is a bust of the scholarly professor, more than life size. At the base of the pedestal, on a rock, sits a personification of the city of Strasbourg as a young and vigorous woman, [ancient] Greek in proportion and costume, who is presenting a civic crown of oak leaves to the citizen, the distinguished and honest scholar and the civil servant, whose loss was mourned by all.

== Influence ==
Koch was a popular and inspiring teacher who quickly established himself at the University of Strasbourg in the years following 1770. His pupils included Goethe, Montgelas, Metternich and Louis-Guillaume Otto. The times in which he lived were marked as much by the idealism of the European enlightenment as by the hardship and uncertainty of war. Koch bridged the culture gaps between the Germanic and the French as well as between the absolutist and the liberal. The new Napoleonic written constitutions of many of the member states of the Confederation of the Rhine were influenced by Koch.

== Books by Christoph Wilhelm Koch ==
- Tables généalogiques des maisons souveraines de l'Europe, 1780
- Tableau des révolutions de l'Europe dans le moyen âge, 2 vol., 1790
- Abrégé de l'histoir des traités de paix entre les puissances de l'Europe, 4 vol. 1796
- Tableau des révolutions de l'Europe depuis le bouleversement de l'Empire Romain en Occident jusqu' à nos jours, 3 vol. 1807

== Journal articles by Christoph Wilhelm Koch ==
- Mémoire sur la société littéraire que Jacques Wimpfeling avait fondée à Strasbourg vers la fin du XV. siècle, in Mémoires de la classe des sciences historiques et politiques de l’Institut

== Sources and further reading ==
- Franck, Jakob, Koch, Christoph Wilhelm von, Allgemeine Deutsche Biographie (1882), pp 371–373 (online)
- Friedrich Buech, Christoph Wilhelm Koch (1737–1813). Der letzte Rechtslehrer der alten Straßburger Hochschule. Ein Bild aus dem elsässischen Gelehrtenleben. In: Schriften des Wissenschaftlichen Instituts der Elsaß-Lothringer im Reich an der Universität Frankfurt. Neue Folge, Band 17, Frankfurt 1936.
- Fuchs, Joseph, Koch, Christoph Wilhelm Edler von, Neue Deutsche Biographie 12 (1979), pp 260–261 (online)
- Bernhard Koerner (Ed.), Genealogisches Handbuch Bürgerlicher Familien. Band 9, Berlin 1902.
- Eberhard Weis, Montgelas. 1759-1799. Zwischen Revolution und Reform. München 1971.
- Briefe Conrad Reinhard von Kochs (letters of Conrad Reinhard von Koch), Stadtarchiv Teublitz (Teublitz city archive).
- Koch's grave monument
