= John Morgan (physician) =

Physician and professor in colonial Pennsylvania, United States

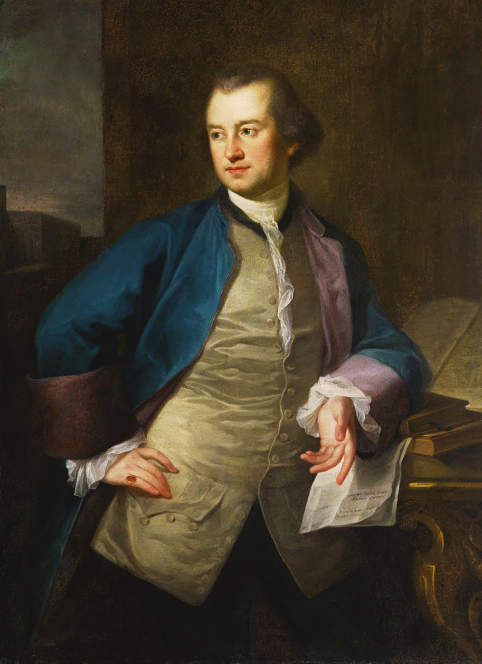
- A portrait of Morgan, c. 1764
- Born: June 10, 1735; Philadelphia, Province of Pennsylvania, British America
- Died: October 15, 1789 (aged 54); Philadelphia, Pennsylvania, U.S.
- Education: University of Edinburgh; University of Pennsylvania
- Known for: founder of what is now the Perelman School of Medicine at the University of Pennsylvania
- Spouse: Mary Hopkinson
- Scientific career
- Doctoral advisor: William Cullen

John Morgan (June 10, 1735 – October 15, 1789), "founder of Public Medical Instruction in America," was co-founder of the Medical College at the University of Pennsylvania, the first medical school in Colonial America. He served as the second chief physician and director general of the Continental Army, an early name for the Surgeon General of the United States Army. He was an early member of the American Philosophical Society, elected in 1766, where he served as curator from 1769 to 1770.

== Early life and education ==
The first son of Evan Morgan, an immigrant from Wales, and Joanna Biles, Morgan was born in Philadelphia in the Province of Pennsylvania in pre-Revolution British America. After a classical education at West Nottingham Academy in Colora, Maryland, he graduated from the College of Philadelphia, now the University of Pennsylvania, in 1757.

He fought for the British during the Seven Years' War, and was commissioned as a lieutenant and served as a surgeon on the western frontier. After that, he studied medicine at the University of Edinburgh, where he graduated in 1763. He subsequently toured Western Europe, studying medical practice in Paris and visiting Italy. During this time, he was elected to the Royal Academy of Surgery in Paris in 1764 and the Royal Colleges of Physicians of London and of Edinburgh in 1765.

== Career ==
=== College of Philadelphia Medical School ===
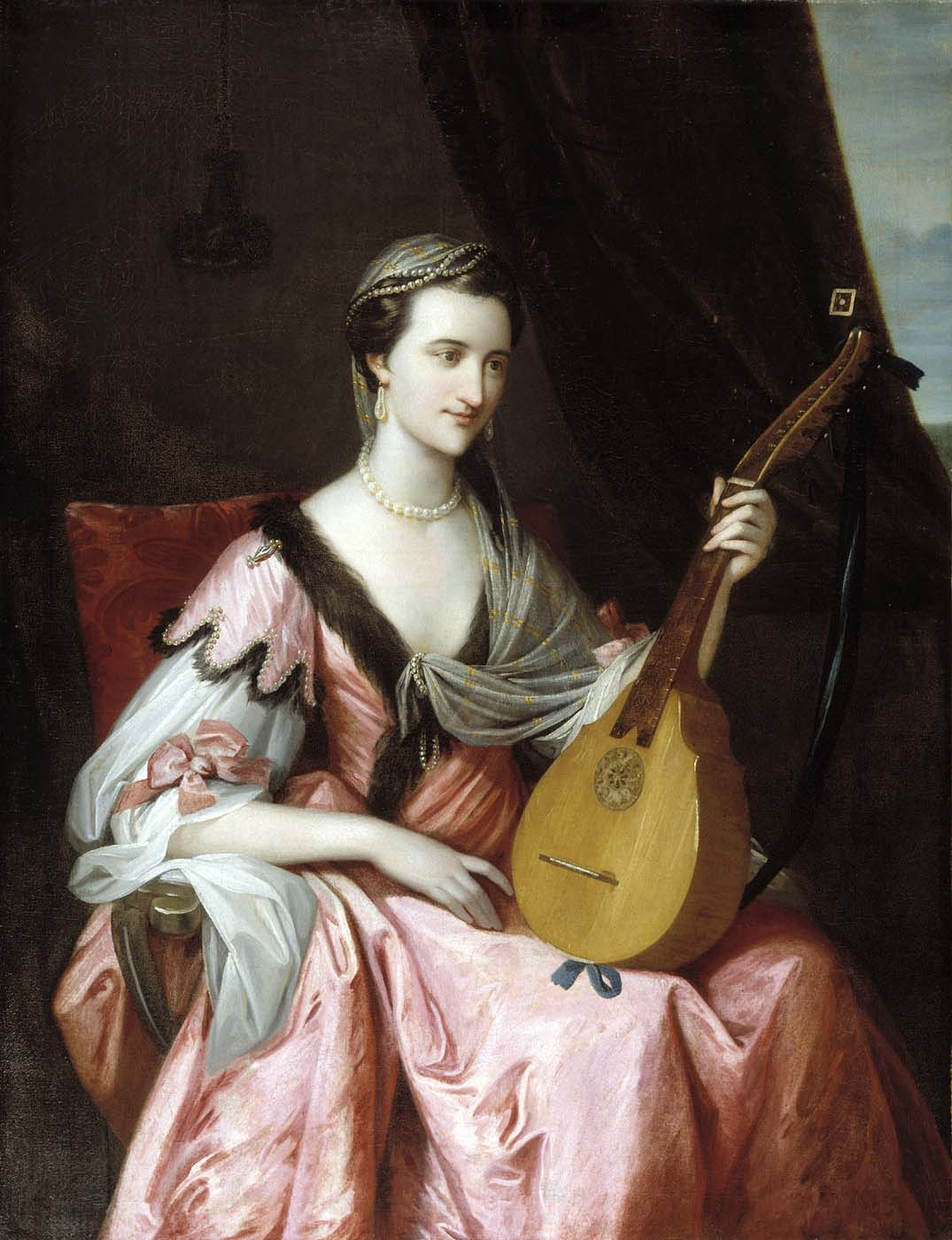
Mary Hopkinson, Morgan's wife, depicted in portrait by Benjamin West, c. 1764

In 1765, along with William Shippen, another Edinburgh graduate, Morgan co-founded the College of Philadelphia Medical School, the first medical school in North America.

=== American Revolutionary War ===
Morgan served as chief physician to the Continental Army from October 1775 to January 1777 during the American Revolutionary War and was empowered by the Continental Congress to inspect regimental hospitals and transfer patients if warranted and to examine regimental surgeons. Rancour among the regimental surgeons became so extensive that Morgan quit following the Continental Army's move from Boston to New York City.

Morgan was a founding member of the American Philosophical Society in 1766, based in Philadelphia.

== Death ==
Morgan died in Philadelphia on October 15, 1789, at age 54.
