= Louis-Guillaume Otto =

German-French diplomat (1754–1817)

- Comte de Mosloy
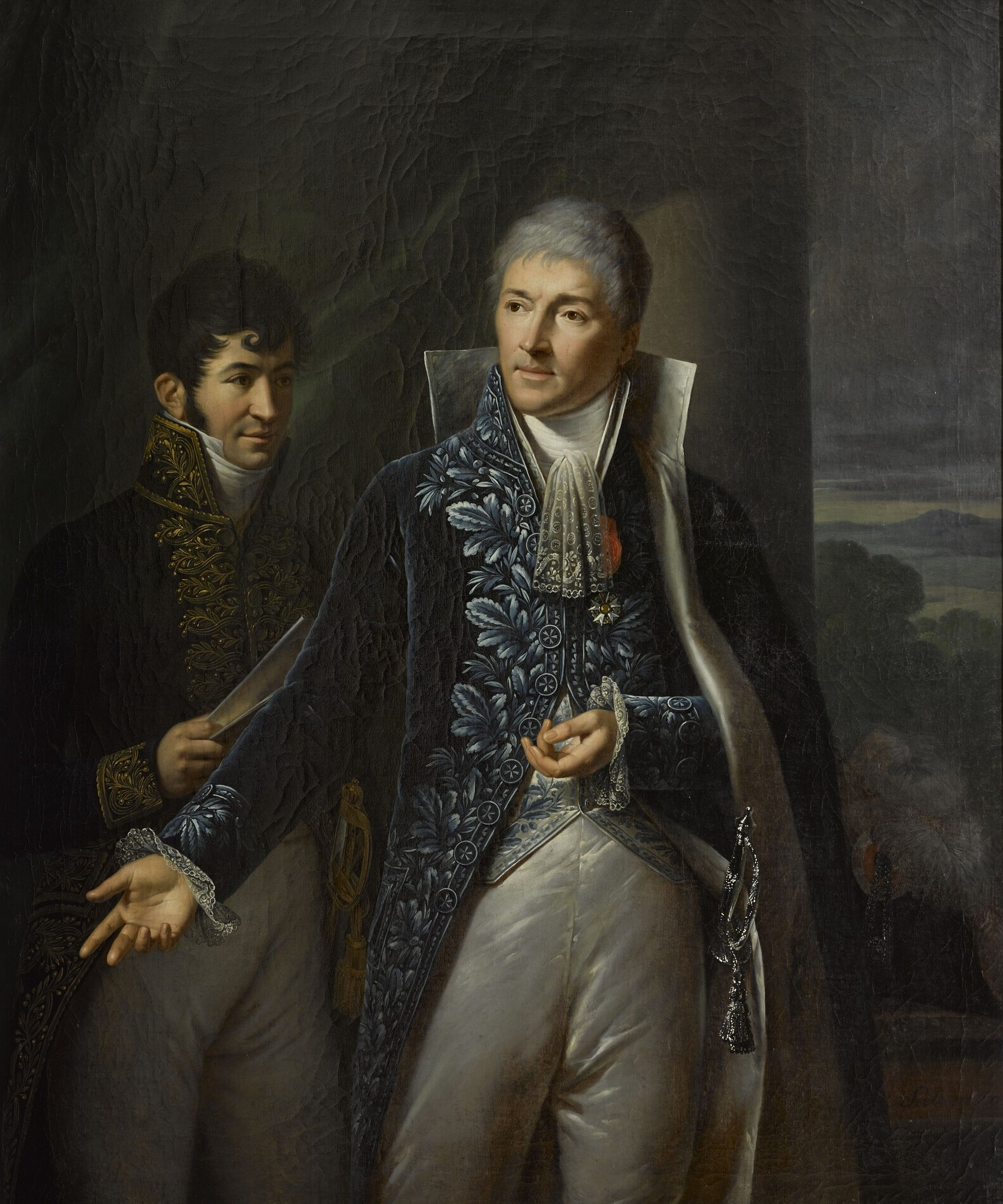
- Portrait by Johann Baptist Seele, 1809
- Native name: Ludwig-Wilhelm Otto
- Known for: Ambassadeur de France
- Born: 7 August 1754; Kehl, Duchy of Baden
- Died: 9 November 1817 (aged 63); Paris, France

Louis-Guillaume Otto, comte de Mosloy (7 August 1754 – 9 November 1817) was a German-French diplomat.

== Life ==
A student of Christoph Wilhelm von Koch and a friend of Emmanuel-Joseph Sieyès at the University of Strasbourg, Ludwig Otto graduated in Modern Languages and Law.

He entered the French diplomatic service, becoming private secretary to César de La Luzerne in Bavaria, before being despatched in 1779 on a diplomatic mission to the newly formed United States of America. Otto fell for Anne Shippen and courted her with letters. Her mother was keen but her father married her to another.

While in Philadelphia, he succeeded François Barbé-Marbois as Secretary of the French Legation in May 1785, serving another two terms as Chargé d'affaires ad interim, having established cordial relations with George Washington and other senior members of Congress. While in the United States he authored reports analyzing the U.S. Constitution and the prospects for its ratification.

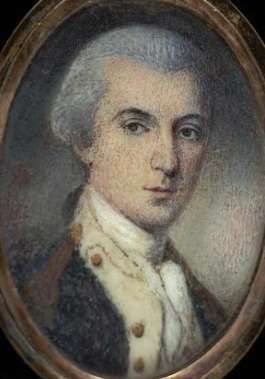
Watercolor by Charles Willson Peale, 1822

In March 1787, Otto married Elizabeth, daughter of Peter Van Brugh Livingston; she died in December 1787. Otto was elected to the American Philosophical Society in 1787.

He returned to France at the end of 1792, and shortly afterwards the Revolutionary Government Committee of Public Safety appointed him as the first Head of the Political Division for Foreign Affairs. However, the fall of the Girondins on 31 May 1793 led to Otto's dismissal and arrest. He then came close to being guillotined, but survived and followed Abbot Sieyès to Berlin as Secretary to his Legation, remaining there as Chargé d'affaires after Sieyès joined the French Directory. A letter written by him on 6 July 1799 seems to be the earliest recorded use of the term Industrial Revolution in French; in the letter, he announces that that revolution has begun in France. He was posted to London in 1800, first as Commissioner responsible for Prisoners of War, before appointment as Minister Plenipotentiary. Instructed to negotiate with the British Cabinet, in 1801, he forged the outline agreement for the Peace of Amiens.

In 1803, he was posted to the Bavarian court of the Prince-Elector Maximilian at Munich. In 1805, his influence on the Elector impressed Napoleon I, who appointed him to the Conseil d'État and honoured him as Grand officier of the Legion of Honour. In 1810 he was despatched as French Ambassador to Vienna, where he negotiated the conditions for Napoleon's second marriage with Archduchess Marie-Louise. Napoleon rewarded Otto by creating him comte de Mosloy in late 1810. During his residence in Vienna, Louis Otto came into contact with Klemens, graf von Metternich (State Chancellor of the Austrian Empire), who had also been tutored by Professor von Koch.

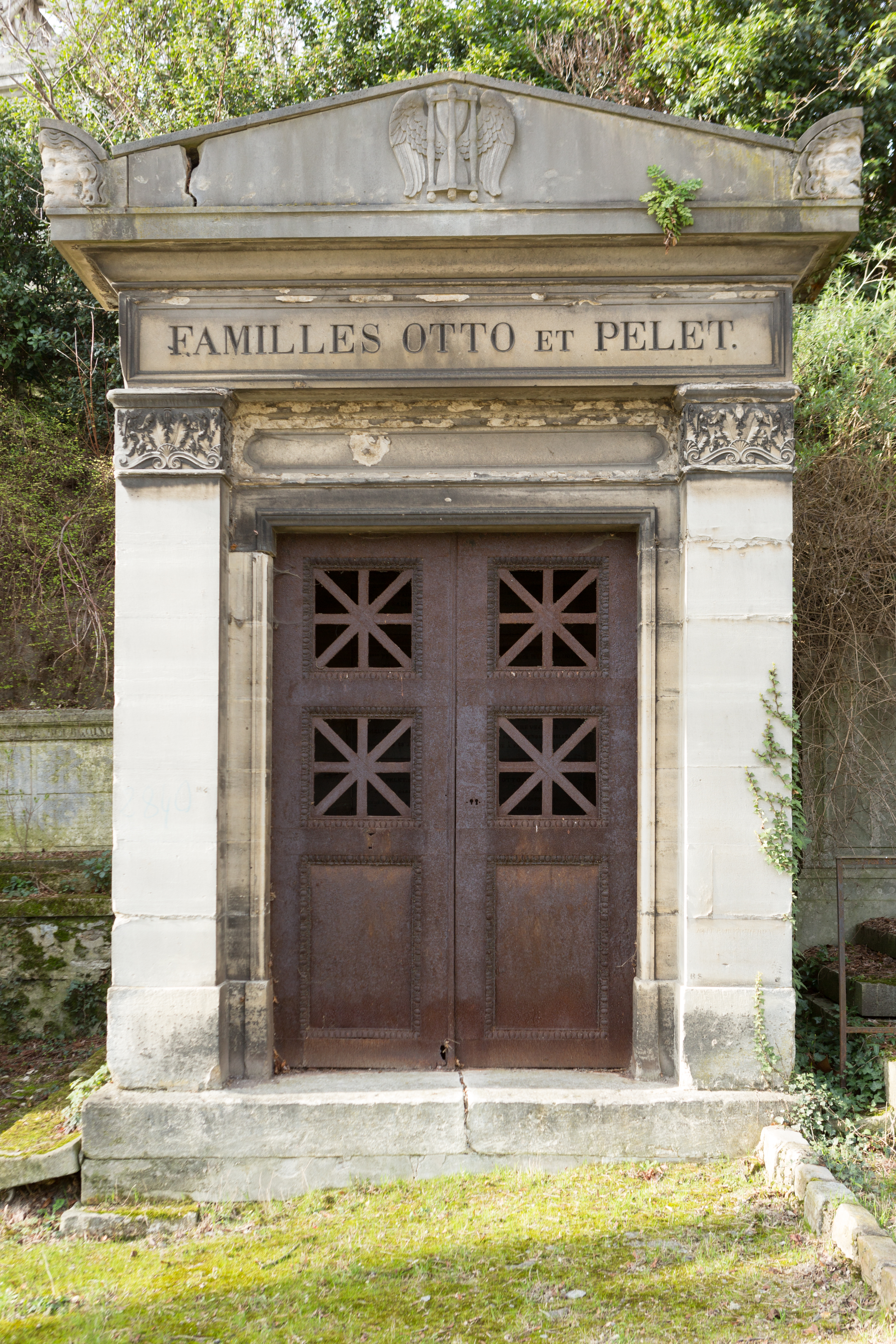
Otto's tomb in Paris

The Count was excluded from politics during the First Restoration and retired after the Second Restoration, since he had served as Under-Secretary for Foreign Affairs from 24 March until 22 June during the Hundred Days.

Following his death in 1817 Otto was buried in the 37th division at Cimetière du Père-Lachaise in Paris.

== Coat of arms ==
Blazon: "Écartelé, aux 1 et 4 fascé d'or et de sable; au 2 d'argent à une loutre de sable issante d'une rivière d'azur engoulant un poisson d'or; au 3 de gueules au lion léopardé d'or tenant un coeur d'argent" (in French)

== See also ==
- List of Ambassadors of France to the United Kingdom
