= William Shippen Jr. =

American physician

William Shippen, Jr.
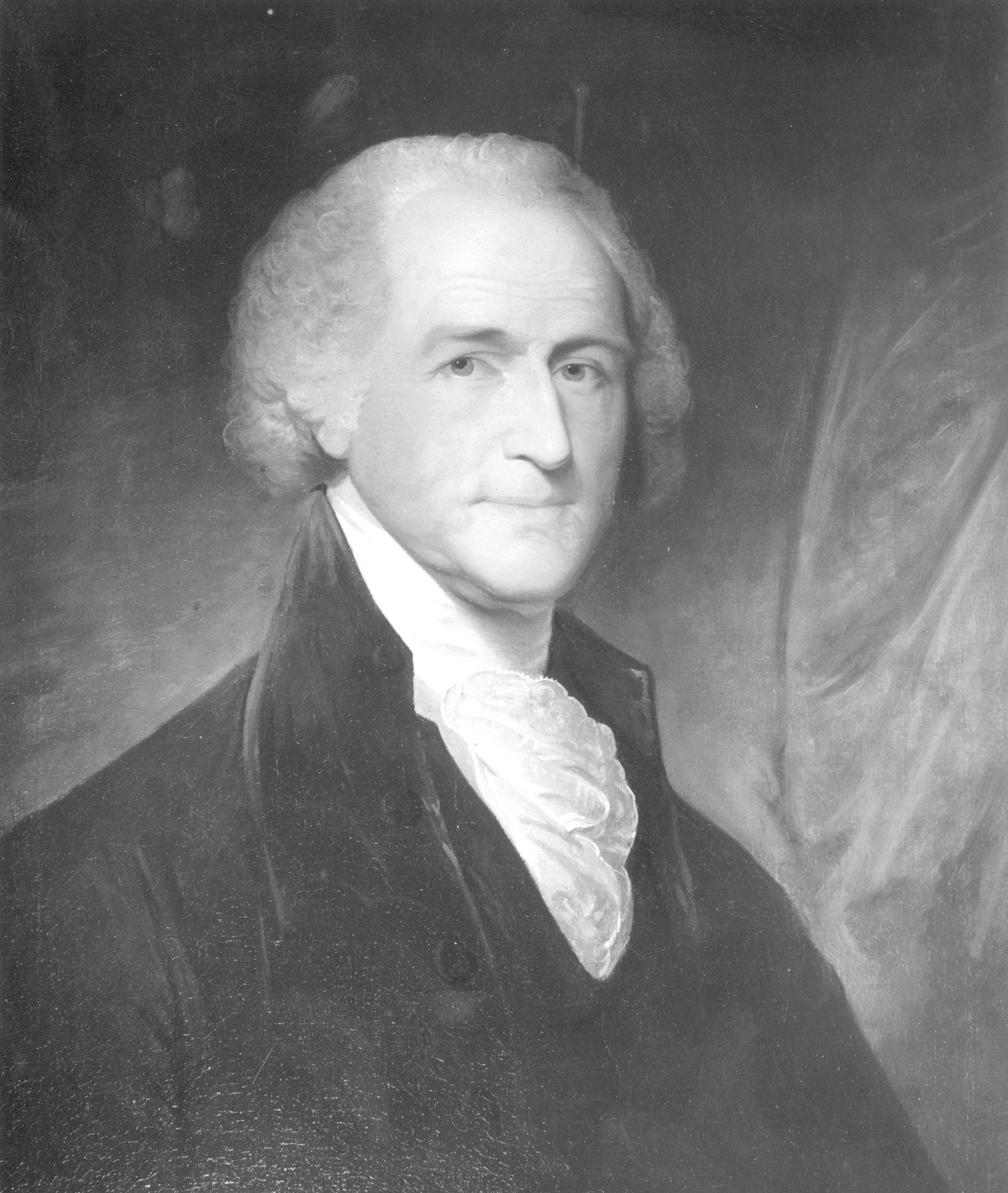
- painted by Charles Willson Peale after a portrait by Gilbert Stuart

3rd Surgeon General of the United States Army
- In office 1775–1777
- Preceded by: John Morgan
- Succeeded by: John Cochran

Personal details
- Born: October 21, 1736 Philadelphia, Province of Pennsylvania, British America
- Died: July 11, 1808 (aged 71) Germantown, Philadelphia, Pennsylvania, U.S.
- Spouse: Alice Lee
- Children: Anne Hume Shippen
- Parent(s): William Shippen Sr. Susannah Harrison
- Education: College of New Jersey; University of Edinburgh Medical School

William Shippen Jr. (October 21, 1736 – July 11, 1808), was the first systematic teacher of anatomy, surgery and obstetrics in Colonial America and founded the first maternity hospital in America. He was the 3rd Director General of Hospitals of the Continental Army.

== Early life ==
He was born on October 21, 1736, in Philadelphia, Pennsylvania. He was the son of William Shippen Sr. (1712–1801), also a doctor, and Susannah (née Harrison) Shippen. His sister, Susan Shippen, was married to Samuel Blair, the second Chaplain of the United States House of Representatives.

He studied with Reverend Samuel Finley at West Nottingham Academy and then attended the College of New Jersey (now Princeton University), graduating in 1754. His valedictory address won praise from Ezra Stiles and George Whitefield.

Shippen studied medicine first with his father, then went to England and Scotland and in 1761 earned his medical degree at the University of Edinburgh Medical School.

== Career ==
Shippen followed his father William Shippen Sr. into a medical career. At his father's encouragement, William Jr. commenced America's first series of anatomy lectures in 1762. He became one of the first professors (of anatomy, surgery, and midwifery) of America's first medical school (the College of Philadelphia, now the University of Pennsylvania), which he co-founded in 1765 with Dr. John Morgan. At the time, male midwifery was considered "offensive" and people threw stones through the windows of his dissecting rooms and occasionally burst into his rooms in mobs.

Like his father, William Shippen Jr. was elected to the revived American Philosophical Society in 1767, where he served as Curator from 1771 to 1772, and as Secretary from 1772 to 1773.

=== American Revolution ===
During the American Revolutionary War, Shippen served as Chief Physician & Director General of the Hospital of the Continental Army in New Jersey (1776) and as Director General of the Hospitals West of the Hudson River (October 1776). Ultimately, he served (April 11, 1777 – January 1781) as Director of Hospitals for the Continental Army, a precursor of the Surgeon General of the U.S. Army. Shippen had connived to replace Dr. Morgan, his predecessor in that position. Later Morgan, with the assistance of Dr. Benjamin Rush, brought about his forced resignation. He was subsequently court martialed for misappropriating supplies intended for recovering soldiers and underreporting deaths, but was acquitted on a technicality.

Shippen was among the founders of the College of Physicians of Philadelphia and served as its president 1805–1808. He was also a member of the original board of trustees of Old Pine Street Church.

== Personal life ==
Shippen was married to Alice Lee (1736–1817), the daughter of Thomas Lee, of the Lee Family of Virginia, and Hannah Harrison Ludwell. They were the parents of Anne Shippen in 1763 who was a noted diarist.

Shippen died on July 11, 1808, in Germantown, Philadelphia, Pennsylvania.
