= Arnold Cipher =

Book cipher used by John André and Benedict Arnold

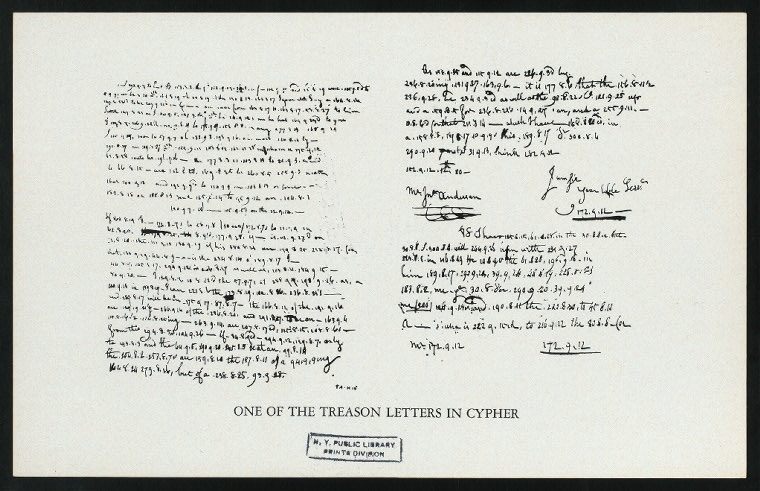
A coded communication. Handwriting by Peggy Shippen Arnold is interspersed with coded communication in Arnold's hand.

The Arnold Cipher was a book cipher used by John André and Benedict Arnold during the negotiations that led to Arnold's failed attempt to surrender West Point to the British in 1780.

== Background ==
In May 1779, Continental Army Major General Benedict Arnold initiated what became a series of communications with British Army Major John André, the adjutant and spy chief to Lieutenant General Sir Henry Clinton, the commander-in-chief of British forces in North America. In these communications, which were at first mediated by Joseph Stansbury, a Philadelphia merchant, Arnold offered his services to the British. André responded to this offer with a letter dated May 10, 1779, in which he described the types of services Arnold might provide, and described a code which they should use to obscure their communications.

The book used as a key to the cipher was either Commentaries on the Laws of England by William Blackstone or Nathan Bailey's Dictionary. The cipher consisted of a series of three numbers separated by periods. These numbers represented a page number of the agreed book, a line number on that page, and a word number in that line. Arnold added missing letters or suffixes where he could not find a match in one of the books. For example, 120.9.7 would refer to the 120th page, the 9th line on that page, and the seventh word in that line, which, in the following example is decoded as "general".

The actual communications were often disguised by embedding it in a letter written by Arnold's wife Peggy, where the cipher would be written in invisible ink, but might also have been disguised as what appeared to be routine business communications.

== Coded example ==
This code was generated by Arnold for a message to André dated July 12, 1780:

120.9.7, W------- 105.9.5's on the .22.9.14.---- / of 163.8.19 F----- 172.8.7s to 56.9.8 |30.000| 172.8.70 to 11.94. in / 62.8.20. If 179.8.25, 84.8.9'd, 177.9.28. N---- is 111.9.27.'d on / 23.8.10. the 111.9.13, 180.9.19 if his 180.8.21 an .179.8.25., 255.8.17. for / that, 180.9.19, 44.8.9—a—is the 234.8.14 of 189.8.17. I --- / 44.8.9, 145.8.17, 294.9.12, in 266.8.17 as well as, 103.8.11, 184.9.15.---- / 80.4.20. ---- I149.8.7, 10.8.22'd the 57.9.71 at 288.9.9, 198.9.26, as, a / 100.4.18 in 189.8.19—I can 221.8.6 the 173.8.19, 102.8.26, 236.8.21's--- / and 289.8.17 will be in 175.9.7, 87.8.7--- the 166.8.11, of the .191.9.16 / are .129.19.21 'of --- 266.9.14 of the .286.8.20, and 291.8.27 to be an ---163.9.4 / 115.8.16 -'a .114.8.25ing --- 263.9.14. are 207.8.17ed, 125.8.15, 103.8.60--- / from this 294.8.50, 104.9.26—If 84.8.9ed—294.9.12, 129.8.7. only / to 193.8.3 and the 64.9.5, 290.9.20, 245.8.3 be at an, 99.8.14 . / the .204.8.2, 253.8.7s are 159.8.10 the 187.8.11 of a 94.9.9ing / 164.8.24, 279.8.16, but of a .238.8.25, 93.9.28.

== Decoded example ==
Here is how Jonathan Odell, André's assistant, decoded the message:

General W[ashington]--- expects on the arrival of the F[rench]--- Troops to collect / 30,000 Troops to act in conjunction; if not disappointed, N[ew]. York is fixed / on as the first Object, if his numbers are not sufficient for that Object, / Can-a- is the second; of which I can inform you in time, as well as of / every other design. I have accepted the command at W[est]. P[oint]. As a Post in which / I can render the most essential Services, and which will be in my disposal. / The mass of the People are heartily tired of the War, and wish to be on / their former footing - They are promised great events from this / year's exertion—If - disappointed - you have only to persevere / and the contest will soon be at an end. The present Struggles are / like the pangs of a dying man, violent but of a short duration---
