= Anne Shippen =

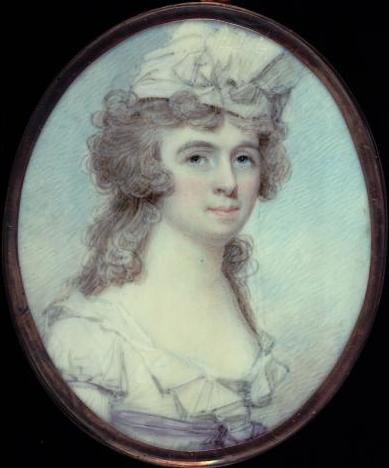
- by Benjamin Trott in 1796
- Born: Anne Hume Shippen; 24 February 1763; Shippen House, Shippensburg, Pennsylvania, British America
- Died: 25 August 1841 (aged 78); Philadelphia, Pennsylvania, U.S.
- Occupation: Diarist
- Spouse: Henry Beekman Livingston (m. 1781; sep. 1783)
- Children: Margaret Beekman Livingston
- Parent(s): William Shippen Jr. Alice Lee Shippen
- Relatives: William Shippen Sr. (grandfather); Thomas Lee (grandfather)

Anne Hume "Nancy" Livingston (born Shippen) (24 February 1763 – 25 August 1841) was an American journal writer.

== Early life ==
Shippen was born on 24 February 1763 in Shippen House in Shippensburg. She was a daughter of William Shippen Jr. (1736–1808) and Alice (née Lee) Shippen (1736–1817), a daughter of Thomas Lee and Hannah Harrison Ludwell.

Shippen House was built by her grandfather William Shippen Sr. and although it is now a large house at that time it was 28 feet by 30 feet. She was brought up there when she wasn't being educated at Mrs Rogers's school in Trenton, New Jersey. In 1796 she was painted by Benjamin Trott.

== Personal life ==
Shippen was romanced by the French diplomat Louis-Guillaume Otto, but her father decided that he would marry her to Colonel Henry Beekman Livingston in 1781. Her husband commanded the 4th New York Regiment at the Battles of Saratoga and Monmouth and during the winter at Valley Forge. He was the son of Robert Livingston (1718–1775) and great-grandson of Robert Livingston the Elder, 1st Lord of Livingston Manor.

Within a year of their wedding, the couple's marriage was already in question. Livingston, notorious locally for his anger and licentiousness, drove Anne to leave for Philadelphia, where she gave birth to their child Margaret Beekman "Peggy" Livingston (1781–1864). From Philadelphia, Anne started her journal in 1783. Her journal, for which she is remembered today, provided insight into her social life and her thwarted attempts to obtain a divorce. Livingston, while Peggy was living for the summer with her grandmother Margaret Beekman Livingston at Clermont, abducted his daughter, and only returned her on the condition that she never return to her mother in Philadelphia. After this, Anne had to live with her parents and her daughter went to live with the estranged husband's mother. Then, when Livingston sued his mother for custody of the child, she secretly sent her to Philadelphia to live once more with the Shippens.

Shippen died in Philadelphia in 1841 whilst living with her daughter.
