= Shippen House =

Historic house in Pennsylvania, United States

- U.S. National Register of Historic Places
- Pennsylvania state historical marker
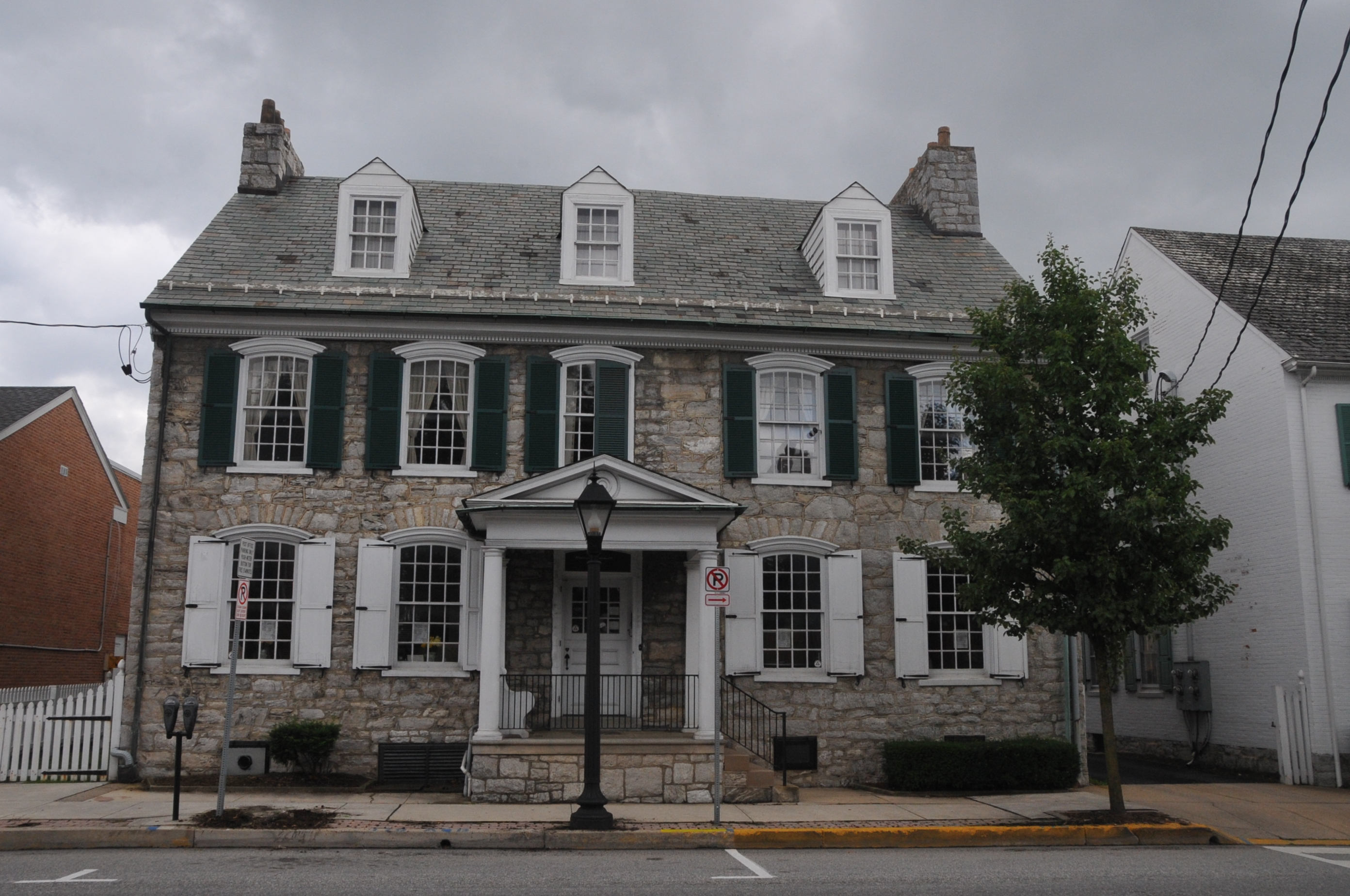

- Location within Pennsylvania Location within the United States
- Location: 52 W. King St., Shippensburg, Pennsylvania
- Coordinates: 40°2′59″N 77°31′18″W
- Area: 0.5 acres (0.20 ha)
- Built: c. 1750, 1785, 1935
- Architectural style: Colonial
- NRHP reference No.: 75001636

Significant dates
- Added to NRHP: November 25, 1975
- Designated PHMC: March 30, 1950

Shippen House is a historic home located at Shippensburg in Cumberland County, Pennsylvania. It is a large 2½-story, limestone building, built in three phases.

== History ==
The oldest section of the house was built in about 1750. It measured 28 feet wide and 32 feet deep. The original house was built by Edward Shippen, III (1703-1781), who laid out Shippensburg and occupied the house on periodic visits to his trading companies.

This is where Anne Shippen was born in 1763 where her parents William and Alice Shippen lived. William Shippen lectured in anatomy and midwifery in a lecture theater which was just by the house.

Anne Shippen returned as Mrs Livingston after her arranged marriage failed by 1783 and she then started a journal. A two-bay addition was built in 1785, and a two-story, brick rear addition was built in 1935 as part of a major restoration effort. A classical porch was also added in 1935.

It was listed on the National Register of Historic Places in 1975. It is located in the Shippensburg Historic District.
