= William Shippen Sr. =

American physician and civic and educational leader (1712–1801)

William Shippen
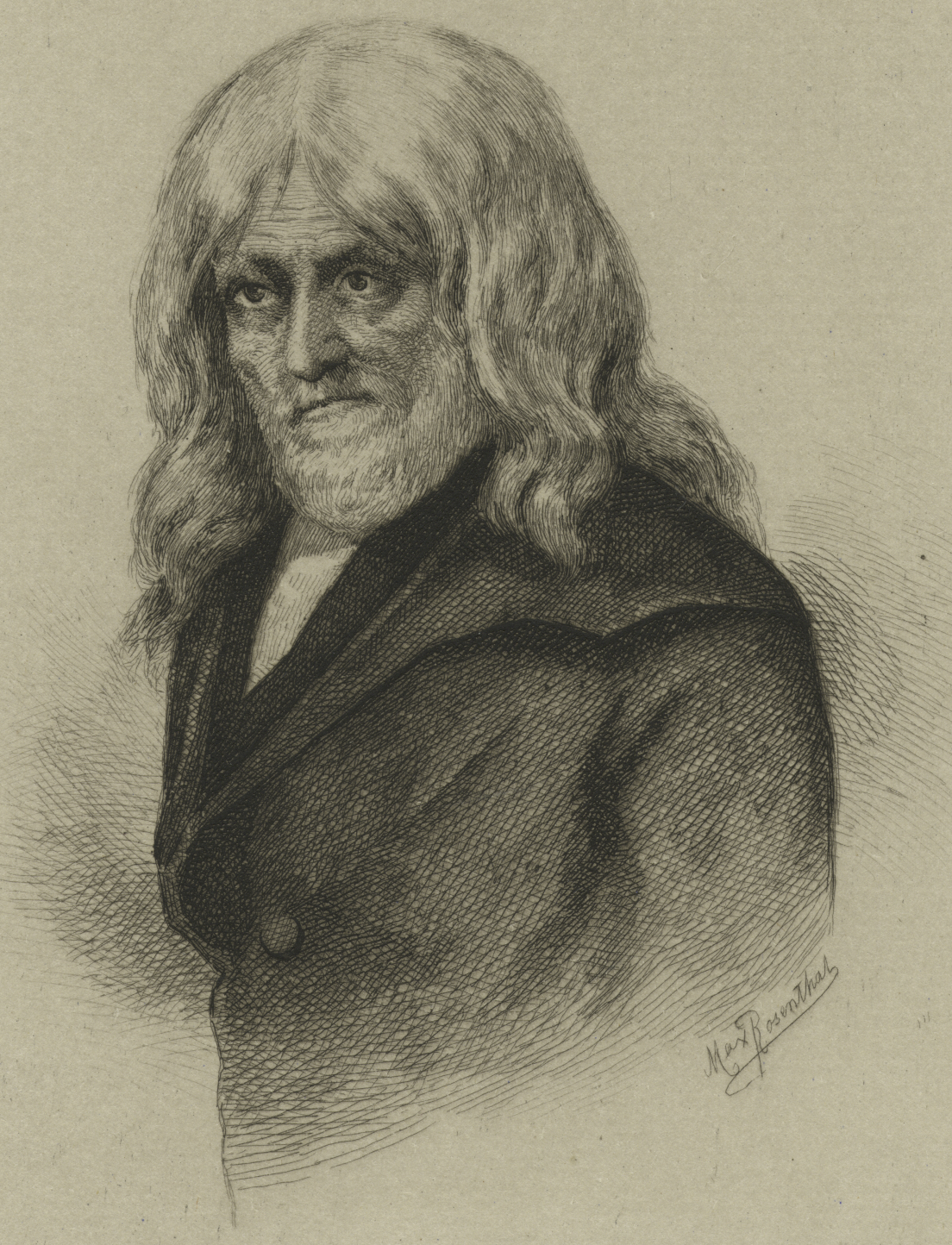
- Etching of William Shippen Sr. by Max Rosenthal
- Born: October 1, 1712; Philadelphia, Province of Pennsylvania
- Died: November 4, 1801 (aged 89); Germantown, Philadelphia, Pennsylvania, U.S.
- Known for: Anatomy
- Spouse: Susannah Harrison (m. 1735)
- Children: 2, including William
- Relatives: Edward Shippen (grandfather); Edward Shippen III (brother); Anne Shippen (granddaughter)
- Scientific career
- Fields: Medicine

William Shippen Sr. (October 1, 1712 – November 4, 1801) was an American physician from Philadelphia, Pennsylvania. He was also a civic and educational leader who represented Pennsylvania in the Continental Congress.

== Biography ==
William was born to Joseph Shippen (1679–1741, son of Edward Shippen, governor of Pennsylvania) and Abigail Grosse Shippen (1677–1716) at Philadelphia. His father was a prominent merchant. He built a large practice in Philadelphia. In 1735 he married Susannah Harrison.

Shippen joined the vestrymen who founded the Second Presbyterian Church of Philadelphia in 1742. He joined Benjamin Franklin and other civic leaders to found the Public Academy in 1749 and served as one of its trustees. When it merged with another school to become the College of Philadelphia, he served as a trustee of the college from 1755 to 1779; the College is now the University of Pennsylvania.

He was elected to the revived American Philosophical Society in 1767, and served as its vice president from 1768-1769, and from 1779-1801.

While teaching anatomy and surgery at the University of Pennsylvania, one of his pupils was future American president William Henry Harrison.

William's brother, Edward Shippen III (1703–1781, grandfather of Peggy Shippen) was one of the founders of Princeton University, for which William served as a trustee from 1765 to 1796.

The Pennsylvania Assembly chose Shippen as a delegate to the Continental Congress on November 20, 1778. He represented his state during congressional sessions in 1779 and 1780, after which he returned to his medical practice.

William remained active well into his eighties. He died at home in Germantown in 1801 and is buried in the First Presbyterian Churchyard at Philadelphia.

== Family ==
His son, William Shippen Jr., followed his father in a medical career and served as Director of Hospitals for the Continental Army. William Jr.'s wife, Alice Lee, was the daughter of Thomas Lee of the Lee family of Virginia; their daughter "Nancy" Shippen (briefly) married Henry Beekman Livingston, the son of Robert Livingston (1718–1775). The family served as guardians of Aaron Burr (born 1756) and his elder sister Sally from 1758 to 1759, after the deaths of both of the Burr children's parents as well as both of their maternal grandparents in 1757 and 1758. In 1759, the Burr children's guardianship passed to their 21-year old maternal uncle, Timothy Edwards.

Daughter Susan married Samuel Blair, the second Chaplain of the United States House of Representatives.
