= Johann Daniel Schöpflin =

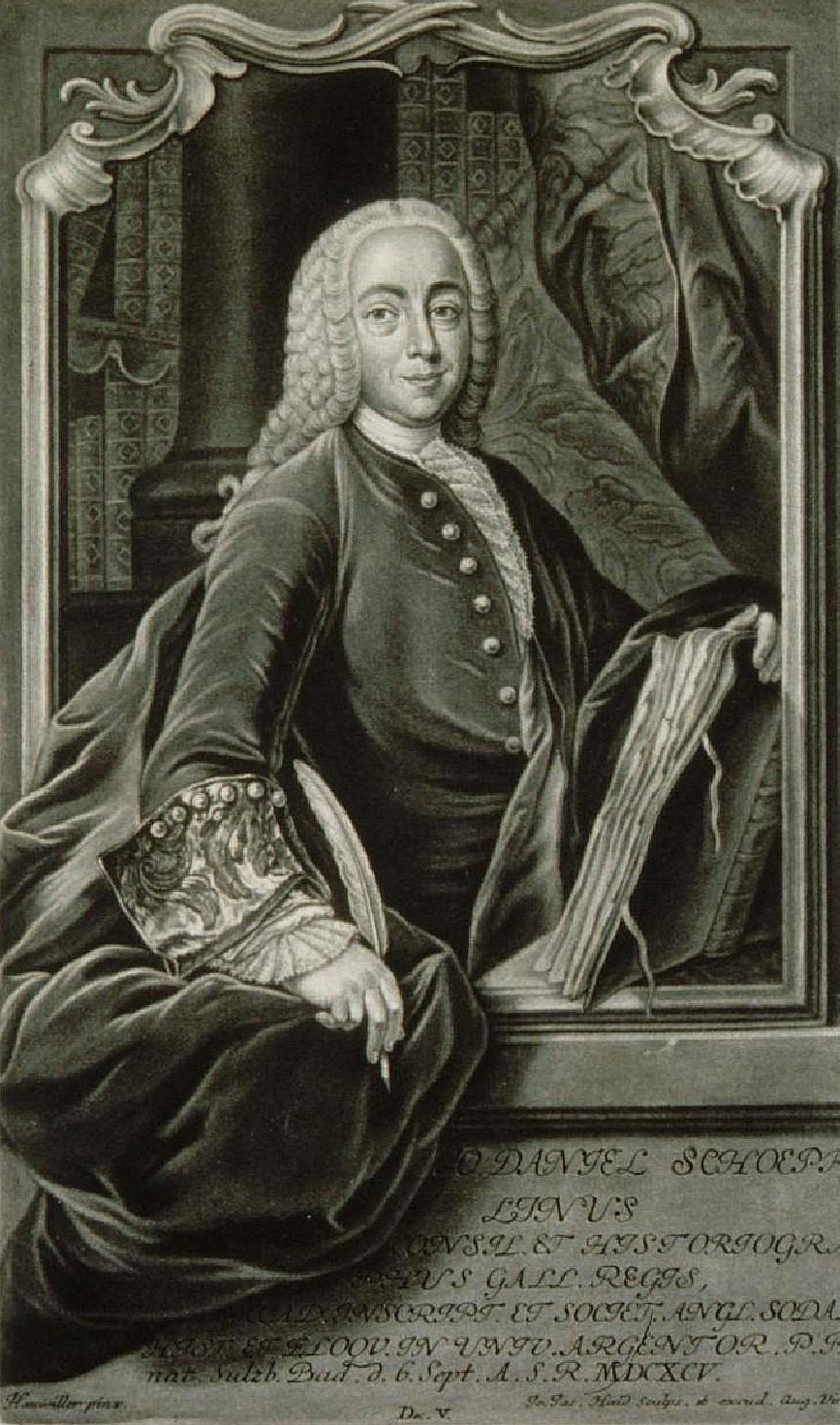
ohann Daniel Schöpflin : contemporary engraving

Johann Daniel Schöpflin (6 September 1694, Sulzburg – 7 August 1771, Strasbourg) was a professor of history, rhetoric and law at the University of Strasbourg. He was one of Johann Wolfgang von Goethe’s teachers.

== Biography ==
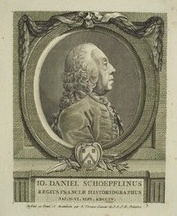
Johann Daniel Schöpflin : engraving by Egid Verhelst

Schöpflin was well known in Europe and had a sphere of influence that went far beyond Strasbourg. His correspondence provides not only a revealing look at university and academic life of the time, but also at culture and diplomacy in the Age of Enlightenment. His comments on his contemporaries and current events are now an important source for this era. Schöpflin’s correspondents included the scholars of the Sankt Blasien Abbey in the Black Forest, Martin Gerbert and Rustenus Heer. He was elected a Fellow of the Royal Society in 1728.

In 1760 Charles Frederick, Grand Duke of Baden asked Schöpflin to write the von Baden family history.

From 1763, Schöpflin was a member of the Palatine Academy of Sciences in Mannheim and was its first honorary president.

Schöpflin taught Goethe in 1770 and 1771, imparting to his student a love of history and especially medieval poetry. The Palatine historian Andreas Lamey (1726-1802) was also one of Schöpflin’s students.

== Writings ==
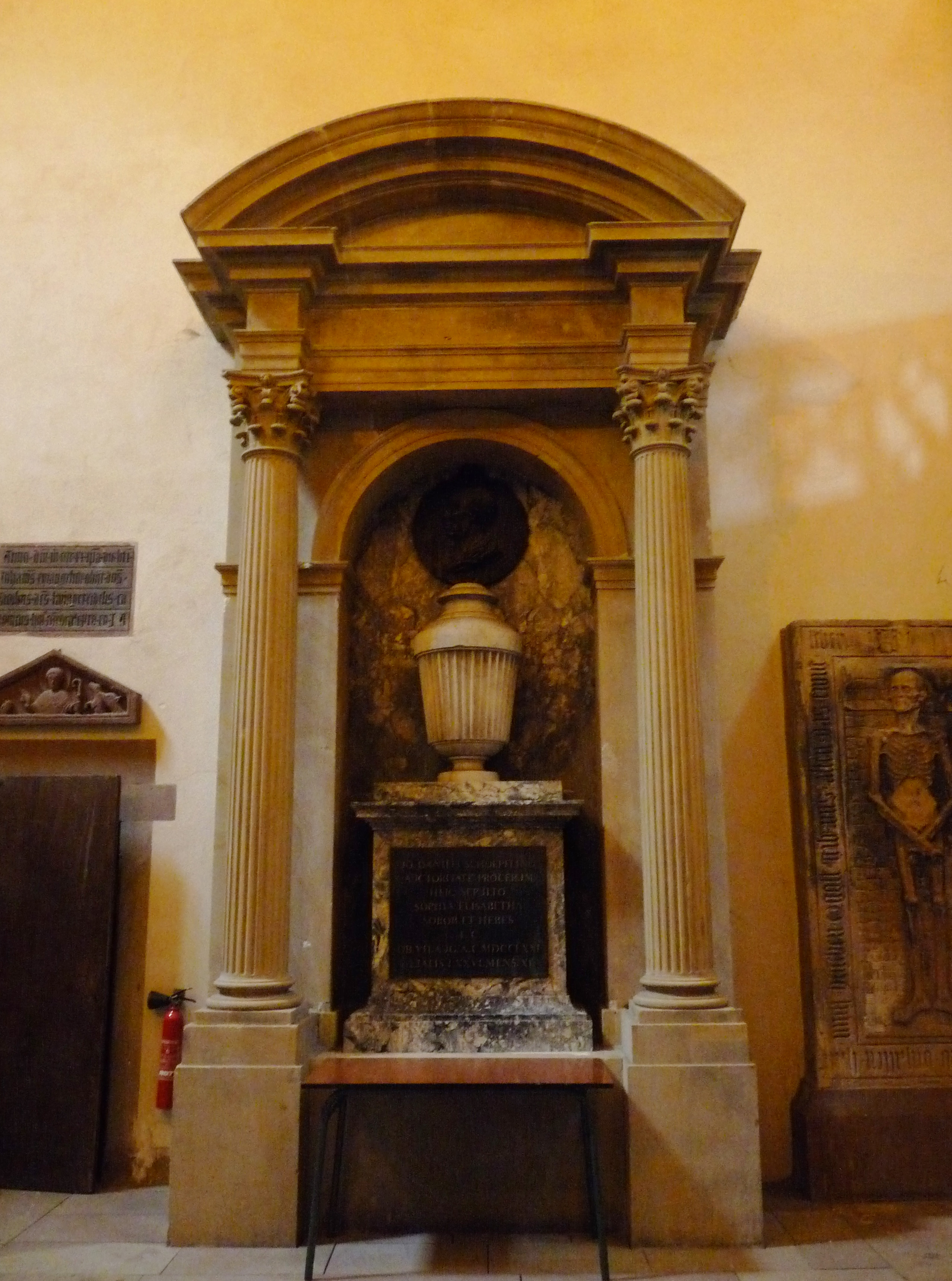
Memorial to Johann Daniel Schöpflin in St. Thomas Church, Strasbourg

- Alsatia diplomatica, two volumes, Strasbourg 1772-1775
- Alsatia Illustrata, two volumes, Colmar 1751-1761.
- Historia Zaringo-Badensis, seven volumes, Karlsruhe 1763-1766
- Vindiciae Celticae, Strasbourg 1754

== Bibliography ==
- Johann Daniel Schöpflin: Wissenschaftliche und diplomatische Korrespondenz (= Beihefte der Francia 54). Edited by Jürgen Voss. Thorbecke, Stuttgart 2002, ISBN 3-7995-7448-4
- Jürgen Voss: Universität, Geschichtswissenschaft und Diplomatie im Zeitalter der Aufklärung. Johann Daniel Schöpflin (1694–1771) (= Veröffentlichungen des Historischen Instituts der Universität Mannheim. Bd. 4). Fink, München 1979, ISBN 3-7705-1459-9 (Also: Mannheim Universität, Habilitations-Magazine, 1976).
