= Edward Shippen III =

Mayor of Philadelphia

Mayor of Philadelphia
- In office 1744–1748
- Preceded by: Benjamin Shoemaker
- Succeeded by: James Hamilton

Personal details
- Born: July 9, 1703; Boston, Province of Massachusetts, British America
- Died: September 25, 1781 (aged 78); Lancaster
- Spouses: Sarah Plumley (m. 1725; died 1735) Mary Gray (m. 1747)
- Children: 8, including Edward
- Relatives: Edward Shippen (grandfather); William Shippen Sr. (brother); Peggy Shippen (granddaughter); James Burd (son-in-law)

Edward Shippen III (July 9, 1703 – September 25, 1781) was an American merchant and mayor of Philadelphia.

== Biography ==
He was born on July 9, 1703, in Boston.

Shippen entered into mercantile pursuits with James Logan, with whom he was in business from 1732 as the firm of Logan and Shippen. He also transacted some shipping business with famous Philadelphia pewterer Simon Edgell. There are many advertisements in the Pennsylvania Gazette mentioning Mssrs Shippen and Edgell. Afterward, he went into the fur trade with Thomas Lawrence, as the firm of Shippen and Lawrence.

In 1744 Shippen was elected mayor of Philadelphia. In 1745 and for several years thereafter, he served as a judge of the Court of Common Pleas. In May 1752, he moved to Lancaster, where he was appointed prothonotary, as which he served until 1778. He had large transactions as paymaster for supplies for the British and provincial forces when they were commanded by General John Forbes, General John Stanwix, and Colonel Bouquet. He was a county judge under both the provincial and state governments.

In early life he laid out and founded the town of Shippensburg, Pennsylvania. In 1746 to 1748, he was one of the founders of the College of New Jersey (now Princeton University), of which he was a member of the first board of trustees, from which he resigned in 1767. He was also a subscriber to the Philadelphia Academy (now the University of Pennsylvania) and a founder of the Pennsylvania Hospital. He was elected to the revived American Philosophical Society in 1768, alongside his son Edward Shippen IV.

He died on September 25, 1781, in Lancaster, Pennsylvania.

== Family ==
Coat of Arms of Edward Shippen

Shippen was the son of Joseph Shippen (1678–1741), the brother of William Shippen, physician, and the grandson of Edward Shippen, an earlier mayor of Philadelphia.

Known as "Neddy," he married Sarah Plumley (born November 8, 1706, Philadelphia; died April 28, 1735, Philadelphia), daughter of Charles Plumly and Rose Budd, on September 20, 1725. Their known children included:

- Benjamin Shippen (died in infancy, September 6, 1727).
- Elizabeth Shippen was born on August 17, 1726, at Philadelphia, and died on August 29, 1726.
- Joseph Shippen (September 1727 – September 6, 1727).
- William Shippen (September 1727 – September 1727).
- Edward Shippen was born February 16, 1729, at Philadelphia; married Margaret Francis, 1753; died on April 16, 1806. Their daughter was Peggy Shippen.
- Sarah Shippen was born February 22, 1730, at Philadelphia; married Col. James Burd (see Battle of Fort Ligonier) on May 14, 1748; died September 17, 1784.
- Col. Joseph Shippen was born October 30, 1732, at Philadelphia; married Jane Galloway; died in Lancaster, Pennsylvania, February 10, 1810.
- Rose Shippen was born on September 10, 1734, at Philadelphia and died on September 30.

In August 1747, he married Mary Gray, daughter of William Gray and Mary; he was her second husband.

== Legacy ==
The Shippen House at Shippensburg was listed on the National Register of Historic Places in 1975.

Preceded by Benjamin Shoemaker	Mayor of Philadelphia; 1744–1745	Succeeded by James Hamilton
