= Edward Shippen IV =

American judge

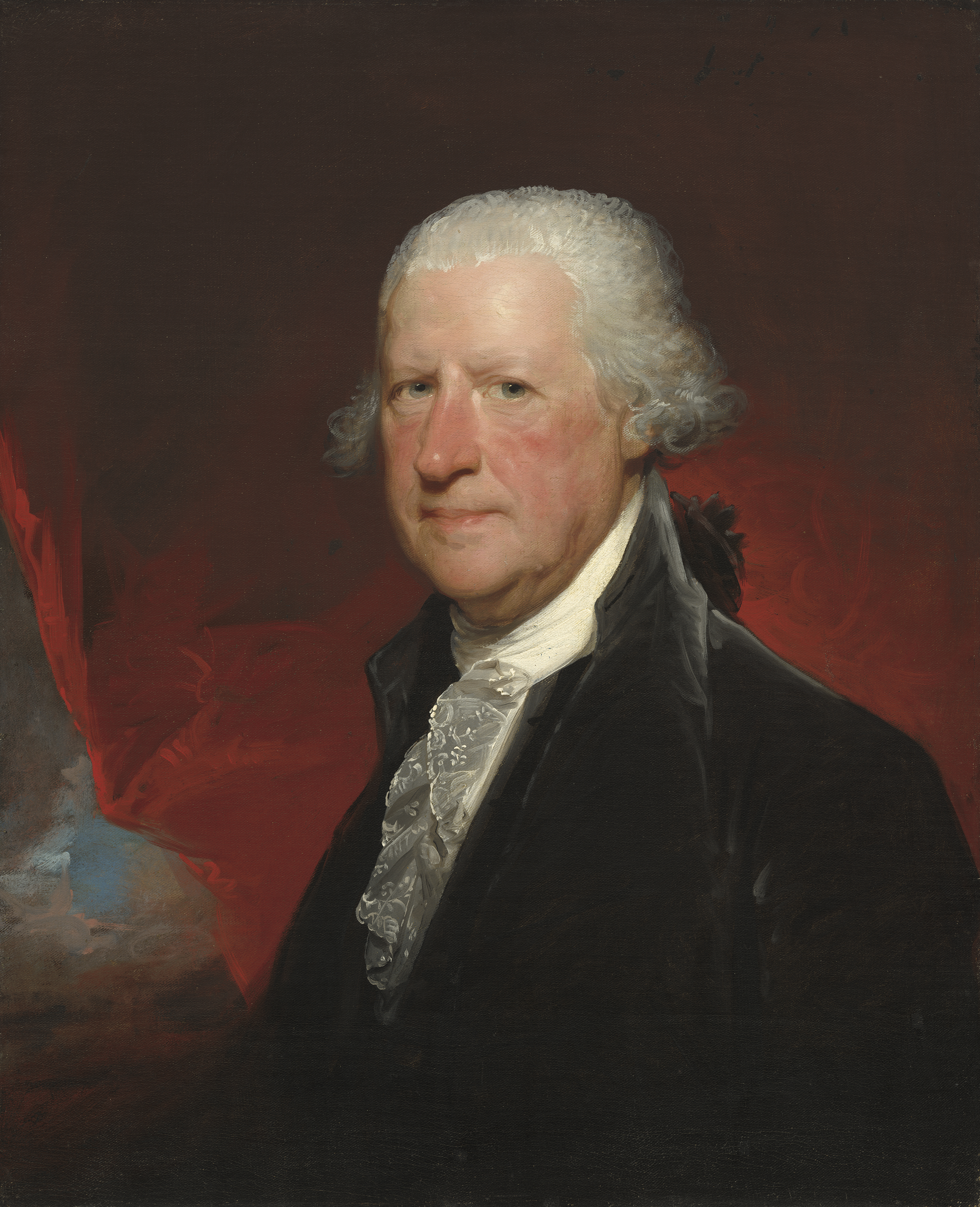
- Portrait of Shippen by Gilbert Stuart, 1796, National Gallery of Art
- Born: February 16, 1729; Philadelphia, Pennsylvania
- Died: April 15, 1806 (aged 77); Philadelphia, Pennsylvania
- Education: Middle Temple
- Occupations: lawyer; judge; politician
- Spouse: Margaret Francis (m. 1753; died 1794)
- Children: 9, including Peggy
- Parent(s): Edward Shippen III; Sarah Plumley
- Relatives: Edward Shippen (great-grandfather)

Edward Shippen (February 16, 1729 – April 15, 1806) was an American lawyer, judge, government official, and prominent figure in colonial and post-revolutionary Philadelphia, Pennsylvania. His fourth daughter, Margaret Shippen, was the second wife of Benedict Arnold.

== Early life ==
Shippen was born in Philadelphia, the son of merchant Edward Shippen III and, his first wife, Sarah Plumley. He learned law from Tench Francis, Pennsylvania's attorney general. He married his mentor's daughter Margaret Francis in 1753, with whom he had nine children. In 1748 he went to London to complete his law studies at the Middle Temple, and, after returning to Philadelphia, was admitted to the bar.

== Career ==
Coat of Arms of Edward Shippen

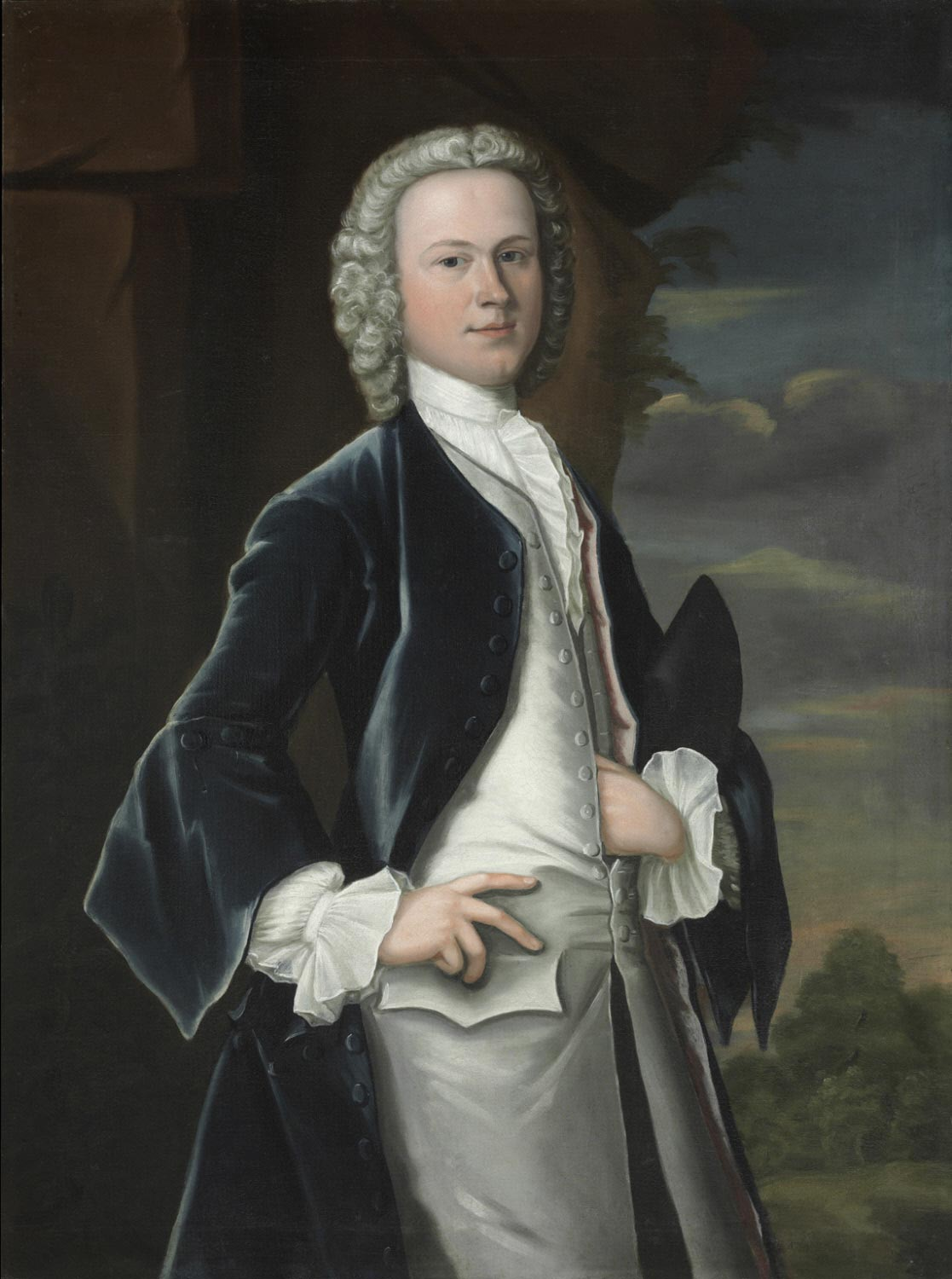
Portrait of Edward Shippen IV, by Robert Feke, 1750.

He was appointed judge of the admiralty court in 1755. Three years later, he was elected to the city's common council. In 1762, he was appointed prothonotary of the supreme court, a post retained till the Revolution. He became a member of the Pennsylvania Provincial Council in 1770.

Shippen attempted to stay neutral in the American Revolution, hoping that the colonies and the mother country would be reconciled. He did not support the extension of royal authority and was therefore not a Loyalist, but he also opposed the radically democratic Pennsylvania Constitution of 1776, which sought to reduce the hold on government by powerful families like the Shippens.

He received in 1790 an honorary LL.D. degree from the University of Pennsylvania, of which he was a trustee from 1791 until his death. He was also a member of the American Philosophical Society.

In 1791, he was appointed to the Pennsylvania Supreme Court, serving with Jasper Yeates and Edward Burd, both kinsmen and former students. Shippen became chief justice in 1799. Shippen was impeached on flimsy political grounds on March 23, 1804 by the Democratic–Republican-led Pennsylvania House of Representatives alongside the other two Federalist justices of the Supreme Court, Thomas Smith and Jasper Yeates. The sole Democratic–Republican member of the court, who had been not in attendance on the day the court heard the case central to the impeachment, was not impeached. The justices were not removed, being acquitted in their impeachment trial before the Pennsylvania Senate in the vote held on January 28, 1805. The next year the Pennsylvania Senate acquitted him and his associates. Shippen retired to private life and died soon thereafter.

== Personal life ==
On November 29, 1753, Shippen was married to Margaret Francis (1735–1794), a daughter of Tench Francis and Elizabeth Turbutt, at Christ Church in Philadelphia. Together, they were the parents of nine children:

- Elizabeth Shippen (1754–1828), who married her cousin Col. Edward Burd, son of Col. James Burd and Sarah Shippen, in 1778.
- Sarah Shippen (1756–1831), who married Thomas Lea, son of Eleanor and Thomas Lea of Dublin, Ireland, in 1787.
- Mary Shippen (b. 1757), who married, as his second wife, Dr. William McIlvaine of Burlington, New Jersey.
- Edward Shippen (1758–1809), a doctor married Elizabeth Juliana Footman, daughter of Eleanor and Thomas Footman, in 1785.
- Margaret "Peggy" Shippen (1760–1804), who married, as his second wife, Gen. Benedict Arnold V, son of Benedict Arnold III and Hannah Waterman King, in 1779; she died in London, England.
- John Francis Shippen (1762–1763), who died young.
- James Shippen (1766–1769), who also died young.

His wife died at Philadelphia on May 28, 1794. Shippen died in Philadelphia on April 15, 1806, at age 77.

== Notes ==
Legal offices
Preceded by Thomas McKean	Chief Justice of the Supreme Court of Pennsylvania; 1799–1806	Succeeded by William Tilghman
