= Benjamin Trott (painter) =

American painter

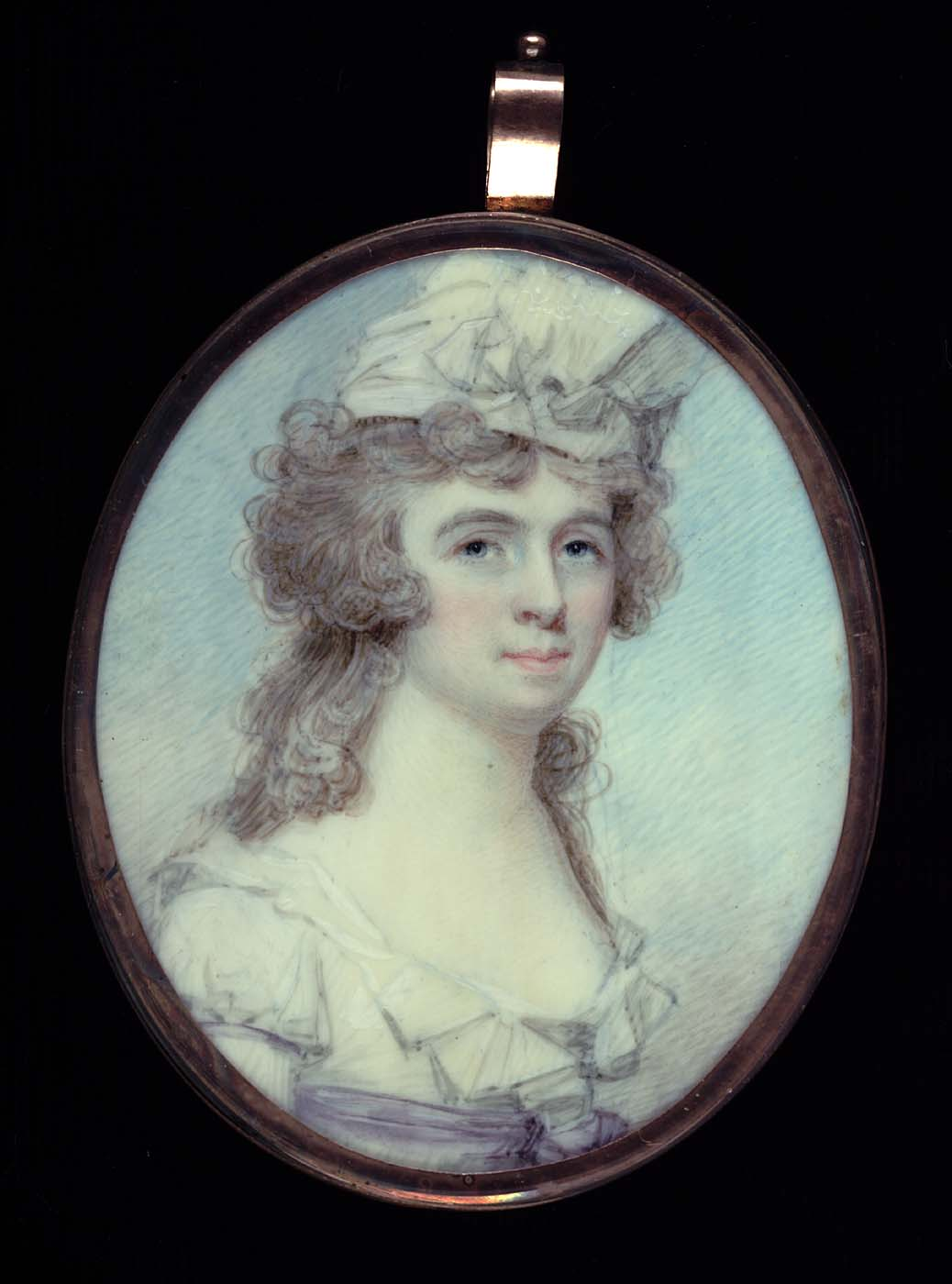
Anne Shippen

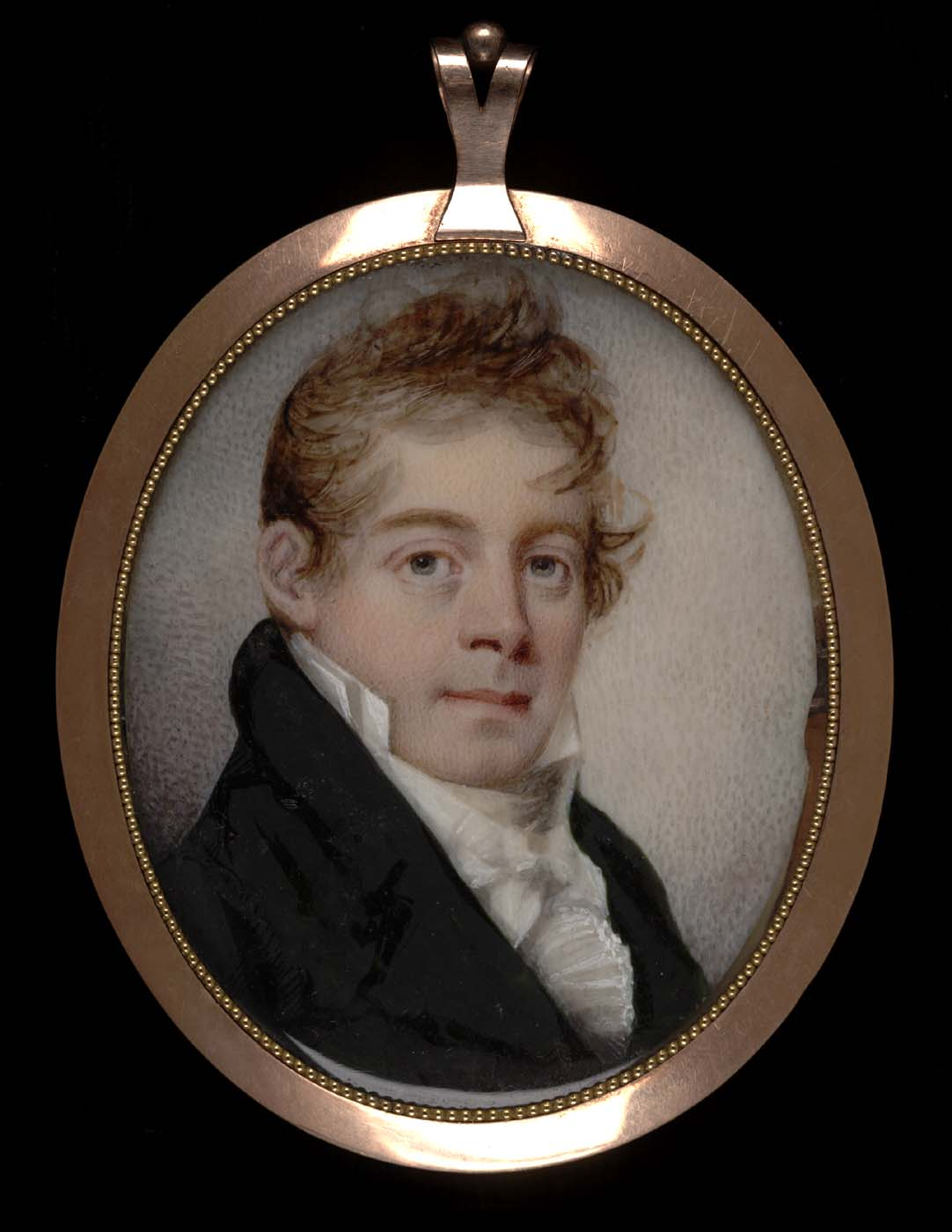
John Cleves Short (1792-1863), son-in-law of William Henry Harrison

Benjamin Trott (c. 1770, in Boston – 27 November 1843, in Baltimore) was an American painter who specialized in portrait miniatures.

== Biography ==
His original source of artistic training is unknown, and he was probably self-taught. He seems to have begun his career as a miniaturist in 1791. His earliest known works are oil portraits of the residents of Nottoway and Amelia Counties in Virginia; possibly painted in collaboration with William Lovett (1773-1801).

In 1793, he was offered advice and assistance by Gilbert Stuart, following the latter's return from Ireland. Of greater influence, however, were the miniatures of Walter Robertson (1750-1802) an Irish painter who had come to America with Stuart. In 1795, Trott accompanied (or followed) Stuart when he went to Philadelphia, which served as his headquarters for many years; interrupted only by a painting trip to Lexington, Kentucky. After 1808, he frequently shared a home with Thomas Sully, who may have introduced him to the merchant, Benjamin Chew Wilcocks (1776-1845), a major patron. The two eventually had a falling out during a dispute between local artists and the Pennsylvania Academy of Fine Arts, where Trott held several major exhibitions. He also taught drawing at the associated Society of Artists.

Citing the weather, he moved to South Carolina in 1819. His stay was brief, however, and he returned to Philadelphia, where he got married. He seemed to be ashamed of his choice for a wife, as the marriage was never publicly announced. It may have failed. He then relocated to Newark, where he lived in seclusion. Later, he moved to New York, where he attempted to paint full-scale portraits, with little success. In 1833, he returned to Boston, for a time. He moved to Baltimore around 1840.

He was apparently obsessed with the idea that some artists had a secret chemical process for applying pigments to ivory and, throughout his life, spent many hours conducting alchemical experiments. None of his later oils are known to exist.
