= Edward Shippen =

Mayor of Philadelphia from 1701 to 1703

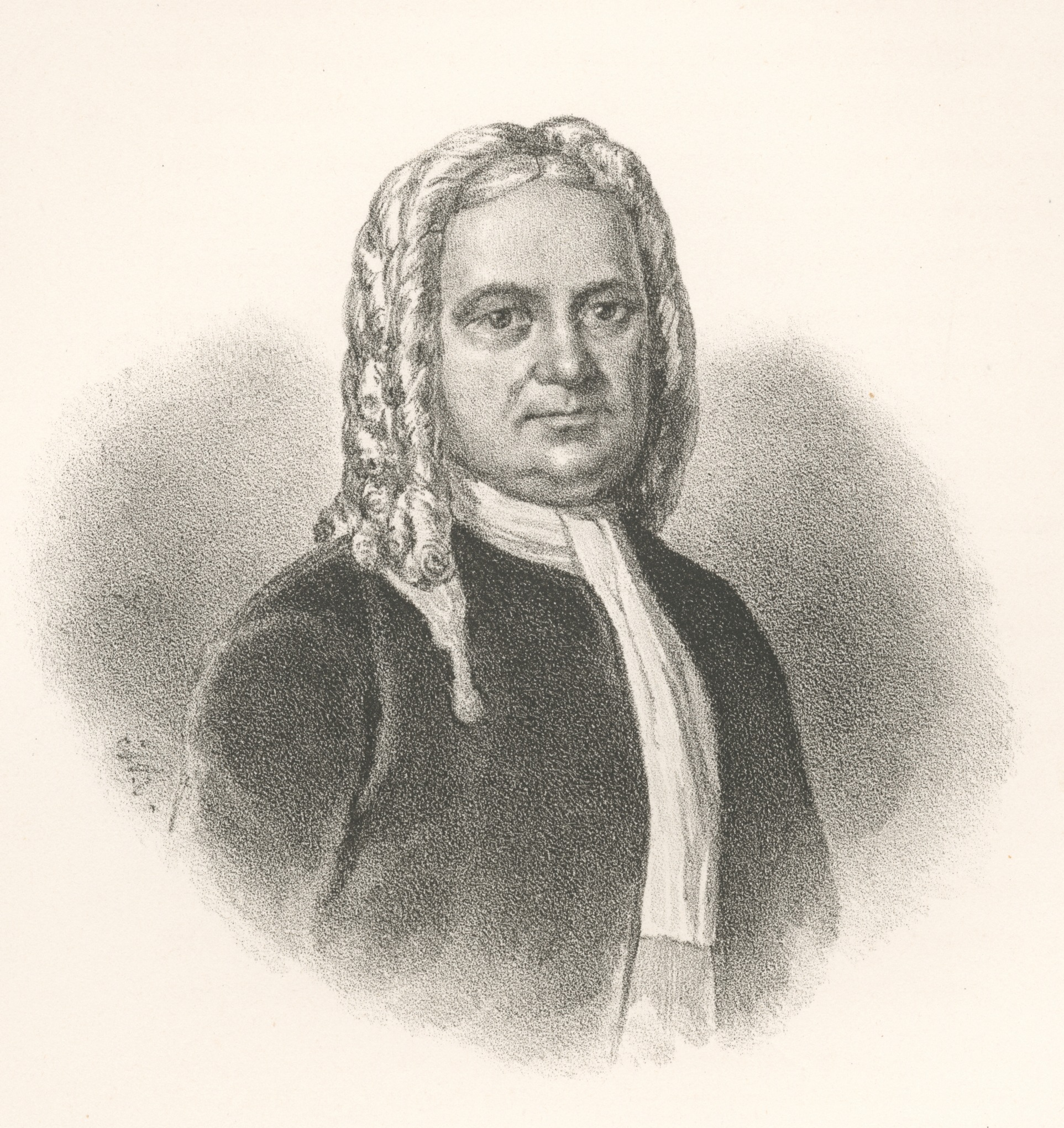

Second Mayor of Philadelphia
- In office 1701–1703

Chief Justice of the Supreme Court of Philadelphia
- In office 1699

Personal details
- Born: 1639 Methley, West Yorkshire, England
- Died: October 2, 1712 (aged 72–73) Philadelphia, Province of Pennsylvania, British America
- Spouses: Elizabeth Lybrand (m. 1671; died 1688) Rebecca Richardson (m. 1689; died 1704) Esther James (m. 1706)
- Children: 11
- Relatives: William Shippen (grandson); Edward Shippen III (grandson); Mary Willing Byrd (great-granddaughter); Peggy Shippen (great-great-granddaughter)

Edward Shippen (1639 – October 2, 1712) was the second mayor of Philadelphia, although under William Penn's charter of 1701, he was considered the first.

== Early life ==
Edward was born in Methley, West Yorkshire, to William and Mary, who were married there on July 16, 1626. Shippen's father was settled in the village of his birth, Monk Fryston, before he migrated to Methley. Monk Fryston is closely linked to the village of Hillam, which was where the Shippen family had hailed from, possibly as early as the thirteenth century according to family tradition.

== Political and legal career ==
Shippen was appointed to a one-year term by William Penn in 1701. In 1702, he was elected to a second one-year term, making him the first elected mayor of Philadelphia. He was also a leader of the Province of Pennsylvania, and served as Chief Justice of the Supreme Court of Pennsylvania in 1699. He also served as the chief executive for the Province of Pennsylvania as the President of the Provincial Council between 1703 and 1704.

Shippen first lived in Boston, where, according to family oral history, he was whipped for being a Quaker before being invited by William Penn to move his merchant business to the new city of Philadelphia.

After the sudden death of Deputy Governor Andrew Hamilton in 1703, Shippen, by virtue of being the president of the Provincial Council, became the chief executive of the Province of Pennsylvania. It was during his term that the Lower Three Counties (modern day Delaware) elected their own Assembly and acted in their own interests. These counties, however, remained under the Penn Proprietorship and their appointed Deputy Governors until 1776 when Delaware became an independent state.

== Personal life ==
Coat of Arms of Edward Shippen

He married Elizabeth Lybrand, a Quaker, in 1671 and became a member of the Religious Society of Friends. She died in Boston in 1688. Shippen married, secondly, at Newport, Rhode Island, on September 4, 1689, Rebecca, widow of Francis Richardson, of New York, and daughter of John Howard, of Yorkshire, England. She died in Philadelphia on February 26, 1704, or 1705. In 1706 he married Esther, widow of Philip James and daughter of John Wilcox, in Philadelphia. Esther died on August 7, 1724.

Shippen had multiple children with his wives, with many dying at a young age: Frances (1672–1673), Edward (1674–1674), William (1675–1676), Eliza (born 1676 and died in infancy), Edward (1677–1714), Joseph (1678–1741), Mary (1681–1688), Anne (1684–1712), Elizabeth (1691–?), John (died in infancy), and William (?–1731).

One of Shippen's grandsons was Continental Congressman William Shippen. A granddaughter was the wife of Philadelphia Mayor Charles Willing, whose daughter was Mary Willing Byrd. Another grandson, Edward Shippen III, was also a mayor of Philadelphia. Shippen's great-great-granddaughter was Peggy Shippen, wife of Benedict Arnold.

== See also ==
- List of colonial governors of Pennsylvania
- History of Philadelphia
- Timeline of Philadelphia

Preceded by Humphrey Morrey	Mayor of Philadelphia; 1701–1703	Succeeded by Anthony Morris
