= Peggy Shippen =

Second wife of British Brigadier General Benedict Arnold

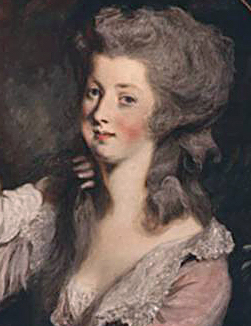
- Shippen, c. 1783-89
- Born: Margaret Shippen; 11 July 1760; Philadelphia, Pennsylvania, British America
- Died: 24 August 1804 (aged 44); London, England, United Kingdom
- Spouse: Benedict Arnold (m. 1779; died 1801)
- Children: 7
- Parent(s): Edward Shippen IV; Margaret Francis

Margaret Shippen (11 July 1760 – 24 August 1804) was the second wife of General Benedict Arnold. She has been described as "the highest-paid spy in the American Revolution".

Shippen was born into a prominent Philadelphia family with Loyalist tendencies. She met Arnold during his tenure as military commander of the city following the British withdrawal in 1778. They were married in the Shippen townhouse on Fourth Street on 8 April 1779, and Arnold began conspiring with the British to change sides soon after. Peggy played a role in the conspiracy, which was exposed after British Major John André was arrested in September 1780 carrying documents concerning the planned surrender of the strategic Continental Army base at West Point.

Arnold escaped to New York City, and Peggy followed. They traveled together to London at the end of 1781, where she established a home and Arnold rebuilt a trading business. In 1787, she joined him in Saint John, New Brunswick, where his difficulties with local businessmen forced them to return to London in December 1791. Arnold died in 1801, after which she had to settle his business affairs and pay off his debts. She died in 1804, having borne seven children, five of whom survived infancy.

== Early life ==
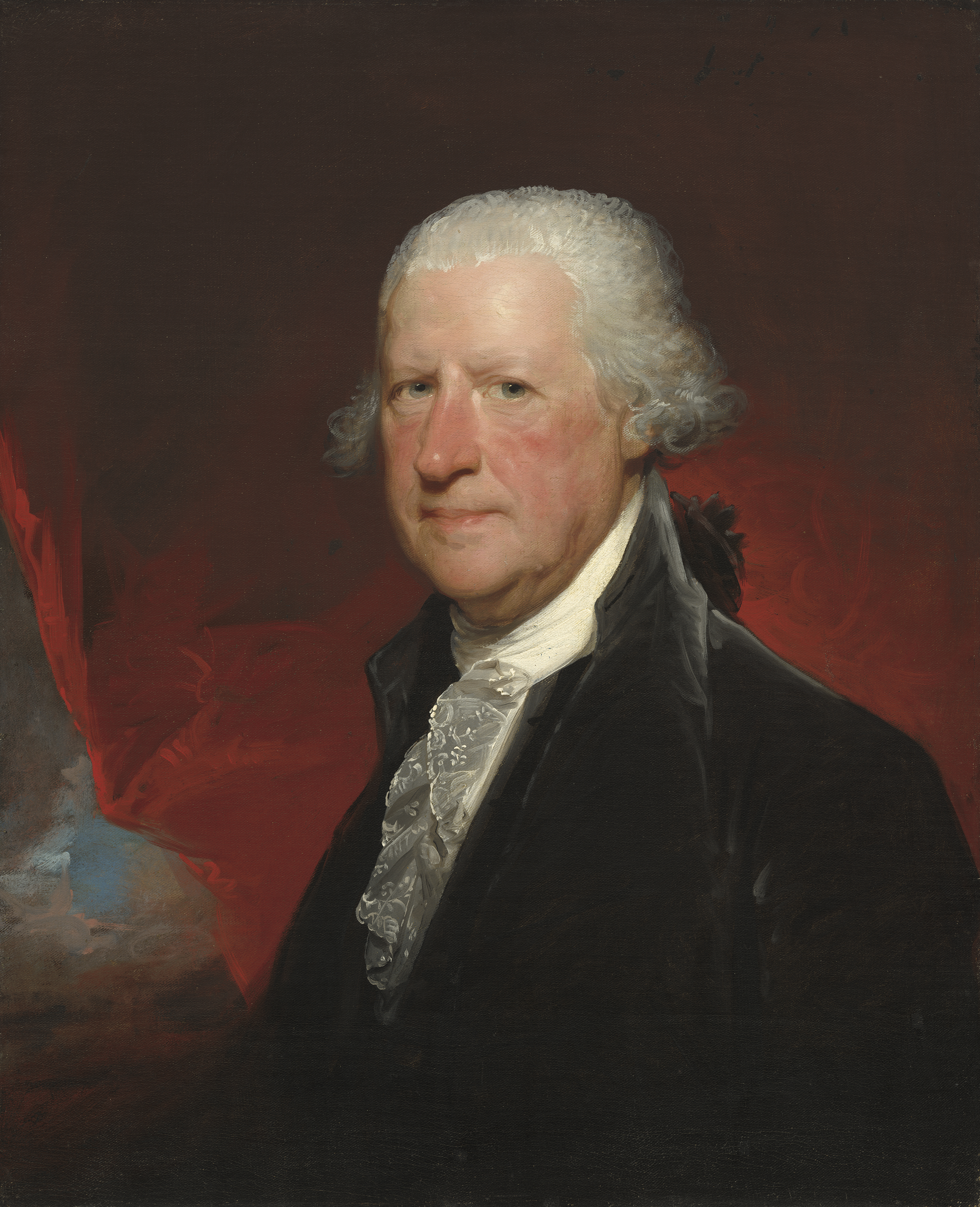
Chief Justice Edward Shippen of Pennsylvania, painted by Gilbert Stuart

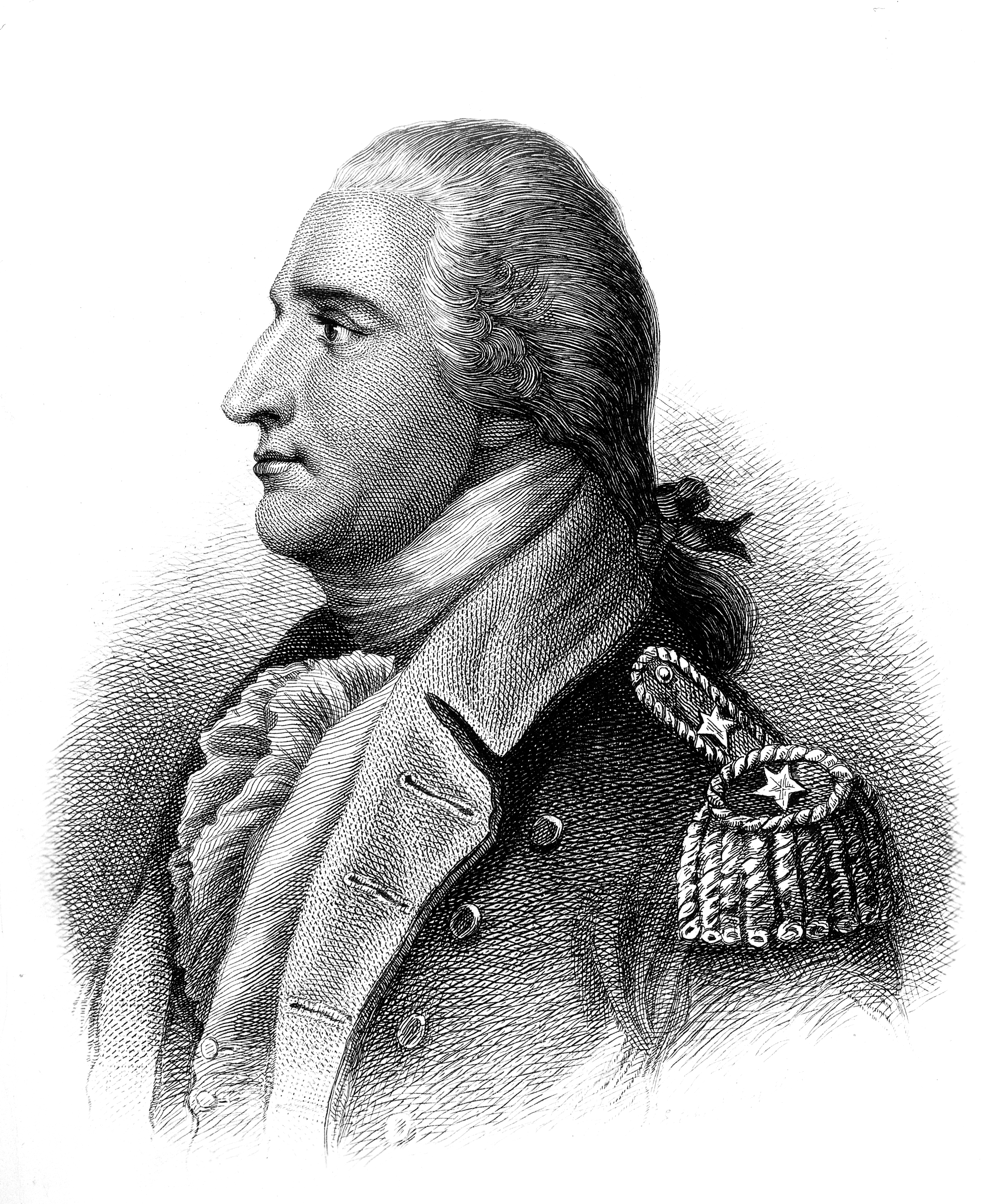
Benedict Arnold

Margaret Shippen was born 11 July 1760, in Philadelphia, the fourth and youngest daughter of Edward Shippen IV and Margaret Francis, the daughter of Tench Francis, Sr.; she was nicknamed "Peggy". She was born into a prominent Philadelphia family, which included two Philadelphia mayors and the founder of Shippensburg, Pennsylvania. Edward Shippen was a judge and member of the Provincial Council of Pennsylvania; the Shippen family was politically divided, and the judge was considered either a "Neutralist" or a covert "Tory " with allegiance to the British crown. Two younger boys died in infancy, and Peggy grew up as the baby of the family and was the "family's darling".

As a young woman, she enjoyed music, doing needlework, and drawing, and participated in the study of politics. She looked up to her father and, under his tutelage, learned about politics, finance, and the forces which led to the American Revolution.

== Courtship and marriage to Benedict Arnold ==
The British captured Philadelphia in September 1777, and the Shippen family held social gatherings at their home, in keeping with their political interests and stations. A frequent guest was John André, an officer in General William Howe's command, and he paid particular attention to Peggy. The British withdrew from the city in June 1778 following France's entry into the war; André left Philadelphia with his fellow troops, but the two of them remained in contact.

In late summer of 1778, Shippen met Arnold, the Continental military commander of Philadelphia, and he began courting her despite the differences between himself and Judge Shippen. Shortly after, Arnold sent her father a letter asking for her hand, but Shippen was skeptical of Arnold due to Arnold's legal problems. In 1779, the Supreme Executive Council of Pennsylvania had brought eight formal charges against Arnold for corruption and malfeasance with the money of the federal and state governments, and he was subsequently convicted on two relatively minor counts. Despite this, Edward Shippen eventually granted permission for Arnold and Peggy to marry, which took place on 8 April 1779.

Arnold purchased Mount Pleasant on 22 March 1779, a manor home built in 1762 for Captain John Macpherson, and he deeded the property to Peggy and any future children. The couple did not live at Mount Pleasant, however, but rented it out as an income property. The couple honeymooned at family homes in New Jersey and Pennsylvania, then returned to Philadelphia to take residence at Arnold's military headquarters in the Masters-Penn mansion.

== Espionage between the Arnolds and Major John André ==
As a newlywed, Peggy may have had contact with her "dear friend" Major André, who had become General Clinton's spy chief. She and Arnold also had close friends who were either actively Loyalist or sympathetic to that cause. Some historians believe that Peggy Shippen instigated the correspondence between Arnold and André and sent military secrets to the British before her wedding. Other suspects in Arnold's subsequent espionage ring with André were Loyalists Rev. Jonathan Odell and Joseph Stansbury.

Arnold hired Joseph Stansbury to initiate communications in May 1779, offering his services to the British not long after he married. General Clinton gave Major André orders to pursue the possibility, and secret communications began between André and Arnold. The messages that they exchanged were sometimes transmitted through Peggy's actions; letters written in her hand also include coded communications written by Benedict Arnold in invisible ink.

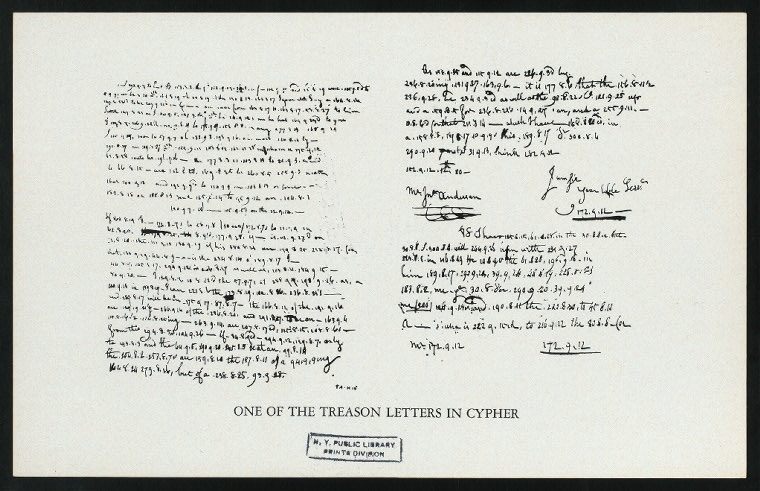
Image of a coded letter: Peggy Shippen Arnold's handwriting is interspersed with coded writing in Benedict Arnold's hand; Arnold's writing would have been in invisible ink.

Enraged by his treatment in Philadelphia, General Arnold resigned his command there in March 1779. Pursuant to the secret communications with the British, he sought and obtained the command of West Point, a strategic American defense post in the highlands of the Hudson River. Peggy and their infant son Edward Shippen Arnold (born 19 Mar 1780) joined him there in a home on the Hudson two miles south of West Point. General Arnold systematically weakened the defenses of West Point with the intent of making it easier for the British to capture.

On Thursday, 21 September 1780, General Arnold met with André on the shores of the Hudson River and gave him documents and maps about the fortifications at West Point in anticipation of the British capture of that site. On Saturday, 23 September, André was arrested as he rode towards British territory, the documents were discovered, and the plot was exposed.

=== Deceiving Washington and Hamilton ===
On Monday, 25 September, Arnold received a note announcing André's capture and possession of treasonous papers and maps. That same morning, General George Washington was planning to meet Arnold at his home, two miles south of West Point. Arnold first dashed upstairs to Peggy, then fled, eventually reaching HMS Vulture on the Hudson River. Peggy was then dressing in anticipation of hosting a breakfast for Washington and his party. Possibly based on a brief discussion with her husband, she faked insanity to convince General Washington and his staff that she had nothing to do with her husband's betrayal.

Before beginning her histrionics, however, she burned all letters and evidence in her possession related to the plot. She then disarrayed her hair before beginning to scream incoherently, wearing too few clothes "to be seen even by gentlemen of the family, much less by many strangers", in the words of one observer. Peggy accused Washington, who she appeared unable to recognize, of being part of a plot to kill her child and begged for his life, appearing alternately frantic and catatonic. She told Washington and his aides that her husband had been carried through the ceiling by "spirits". Peggy's dramatics—described by the author Nancy Rubin Stuart as "the grandest theatrical performance of her life"—completely fooled Washington and his aide Alexander Hamilton, who believed her innocent.

The delay caused by her histrionics may have allowed Arnold time to escape, leaving Peggy with their infant son. Fearing for her safety, she traveled to Philadelphia to stay with her family. She also played the innocent when asked about her husband, even though she knew his whereabouts. Philadelphia authorities soon found a letter from André to Peggy written from British-occupied New York—the so-called "millinery letter"—and seized upon it as proof that Arnold's wife had been complicit in the treason. That led the Supreme Executive Council of Pennsylvania to banish her from Philadelphia. In November 1780, her father escorted Peggy and her infant son to the shores of the Hudson, where she boarded a boat to New York City to join Arnold.

After a military trial, Major André was condemned to death as a common spy and was hanged at Tappan, New York. He was later re-interred in London's Westminster Abbey.

== After the Revolution ==
Hostilities appeared to be winding down in North America after Cornwallis' surrender at Yorktown in October 1781, and the Arnolds left for London on 15 December 1781—including their second child, James Robertson (born in August)—arriving 22 January 1782.

Peggy was initially welcomed warmly in Great Britain, as was her husband; she was presented at English court to the queen on 10 February 1782, by Lady Amherst. Queen Charlotte awarded her an annuity of 100 pound sterling for the maintenance of her children, including those not yet born. King George III also presented her with £350 "obtained for her services, which were meritorious". A girl (Margaret) and a boy (George), born in 1783 and 1784 respectively, died in infancy while the Arnolds lived in London.

Arnold left for a business opportunity in 1784 and sent to Connecticut for his three sons, Benedict, Richard, and Henry (by his first wife) to join him in Saint John, New Brunswick. During Arnold's stay in New Brunswick, Peggy Shippen Arnold gave birth to their third surviving child, Sophia Matilda Arnold, while her husband may have fathered an illegitimate child (John Sage) in New Brunswick. Peggy sailed to Saint John to join her husband in 1787, leaving her two older sons with a private family in London; in New Brunswick, Peggy gave birth to her son George in 1787; their last child, William Fitch, was born in 1794 after their return to London.

In 1789, she returned briefly to Philadelphia, accompanied by her infant son George and a maid, to visit with her parents and family. She was treated coldly by Philadelphians despite her father's considerable influence. Peggy sailed back to New Brunswick with young George in the spring of 1790, and from there returned to the United Kingdom with Arnold in late December 1791. Their departure was unhappy, with mobs gathering on their property to protest against them and calling them "traitors".

After Arnold died in 1801, Peggy auctioned the contents of their home, the home itself, and many of her personal possessions to pay off his debts. She died in London in 1804, reportedly of cancer, and was buried with her husband at St. Mary's Church in Battersea on 25 August 1804.

== Role in conspiracy ==
Historians are unanimous in her complicity, and she accepted a reward for her services from the king. Her family in Philadelphia denied everything.

James Parton, a biographer of Aaron Burr, published an account in the 19th century, after all of the principal actors had died, implying that Peggy Shippen Arnold had manipulated or persuaded Benedict to change sides. The basis for the claim was interviews that Burr conducted with Theodosia Prevost, the widow of Jacques Marcus Prevost, who later married Burr, and notes later made by Burr. While en route to Philadelphia from West Point in 1780, Peggy Shippen Arnold visited Prevost at Paramus, New Jersey. According to Parton, she unburdened herself to Prevost, claiming that she "was heartily tired of all the theatricals she was exhibiting", referring to her histrionics at West Point. According to Burr's notes, Shippen Arnold "was disgusted with the American cause" and "through unceasing perseverance, she had ultimately brought the general into an arrangement to surrender West Point".

When these allegations were first published, the Shippen family countered with allegations of improper behavior on Burr's part. They claimed that Burr rode with Peggy Shippen Arnold in the carriage to Philadelphia after her stay with Mrs. Prevost, and that he fabricated the allegation because she refused advances that he made during the ride. Arnold biographer Willard Sterne Randall suggests that Burr's version has a more authentic ring to it: first, Burr waited until all were dead before it could be published; and second, Burr was not in the carriage on the ride to Philadelphia. Randall also notes that ample further evidence has since come to light showing that Peggy Shippen Arnold played an active role in the conspiracy. British documents from 1792 show that Mrs. Arnold was paid £350 for handling secret dispatches.

== Family ==
Peggy Shippen had seven children with Benedict Arnold, of whom five survived to adulthood:

- Edward Shippen Arnold (March 19, 1780 – December 13, 1813), Lieutenant, British Army in India; see Bengal Army. Died in Dinajpur, Bengal, India; unmarried and childless.
- James Robertson Arnold, KH (August 28, 1781 – December 27, 1854) Lieutenant General, Royal Engineers. Died in London, England; married to Virginia Goodrich, no children.
- Sophia Matilda Arnold (July 28, 1785 – June 10, 1828) Died in Sudbury, England. Married to Colonel Pownall Phipps, in India, two sons and three daughters.
- George Arnold (second of that name) (September 5, 1787 – November 1, 1828) Lieutenant-Colonel, 2nd Bengal Cavalry. Died in Bengal, India; married to Ann Martin Brown, one son.
- William Fitch Arnold (June 25, 1794 – November 17, 1846), Captain, 9th Queen's Royal Lancers. Died in Buckinghamshire, England; married to Elizabeth Cecilia Ruddach, four daughters, and two sons.

== In popular culture ==
Peggy Shippen is portrayed by Erin McGathy and Winona Ryder in the Drunk History episode on Philadelphia. She is also portrayed in the TV miniseries George Washington by Megan Gallagher, in the TV movie Benedict Arnold: A Question of Honor by Flora Montgomery, and in the Revolutionary War drama Turn: Washington's Spies by Ksenia Solo.

She was voiced by Maria Shriver in the animated series Liberty's Kids.

Shippen is also the subject of at least five historical novels: The Exquisite Siren by E. Irvine Haines (1938), Peggy by Lois Duncan (1970), Finishing Becca by Ann Rinaldi (1994), The Traitor's Wife by Allison Pataki (2014), and Mrs. Benedict Arnold by Emma Parry (2026).

== Works cited ==
- Stuart, Nancy (2013). Defiant Brides: The Untold Story of Two Revolutionary-Era Women and the Radical Men They Married. Beacon Press. ISBN 978-0-8070-0117-2.
- Brandt, Clare (1994). The Man in the Mirror: A Life of Benedict Arnold. Random House. ISBN 0-679-40106-7.
- Flexner, James Thomas (1975). The Traitor and the Spy. Little, Brown. ISBN 978-0-8156-0263-7.
- Randall, Willard Sterne (1990). Benedict Arnold: Patriot and Traitor. William Morrow and Inc. ISBN 1-55710-034-9.
- Randall, William Sterne; Nahra, Nancy (1999). Forgotten Americans: Footnote Figures Who Changed American History. Da Capo Press. ISBN 978-0-738-20150-4.
- Wilson, Barry K (2001). Benedict Arnold: A Traitor in Our Midst. McGill Queens Press. ISBN 0-7735-2150-X.
- Van Doren, Carl (1941). Secret History of the American Revolution. Viking Press. ISBN 978-0-670-00232-0.
