= 1816 United States presidential election in Pennsylvania =

- November 1, 1816
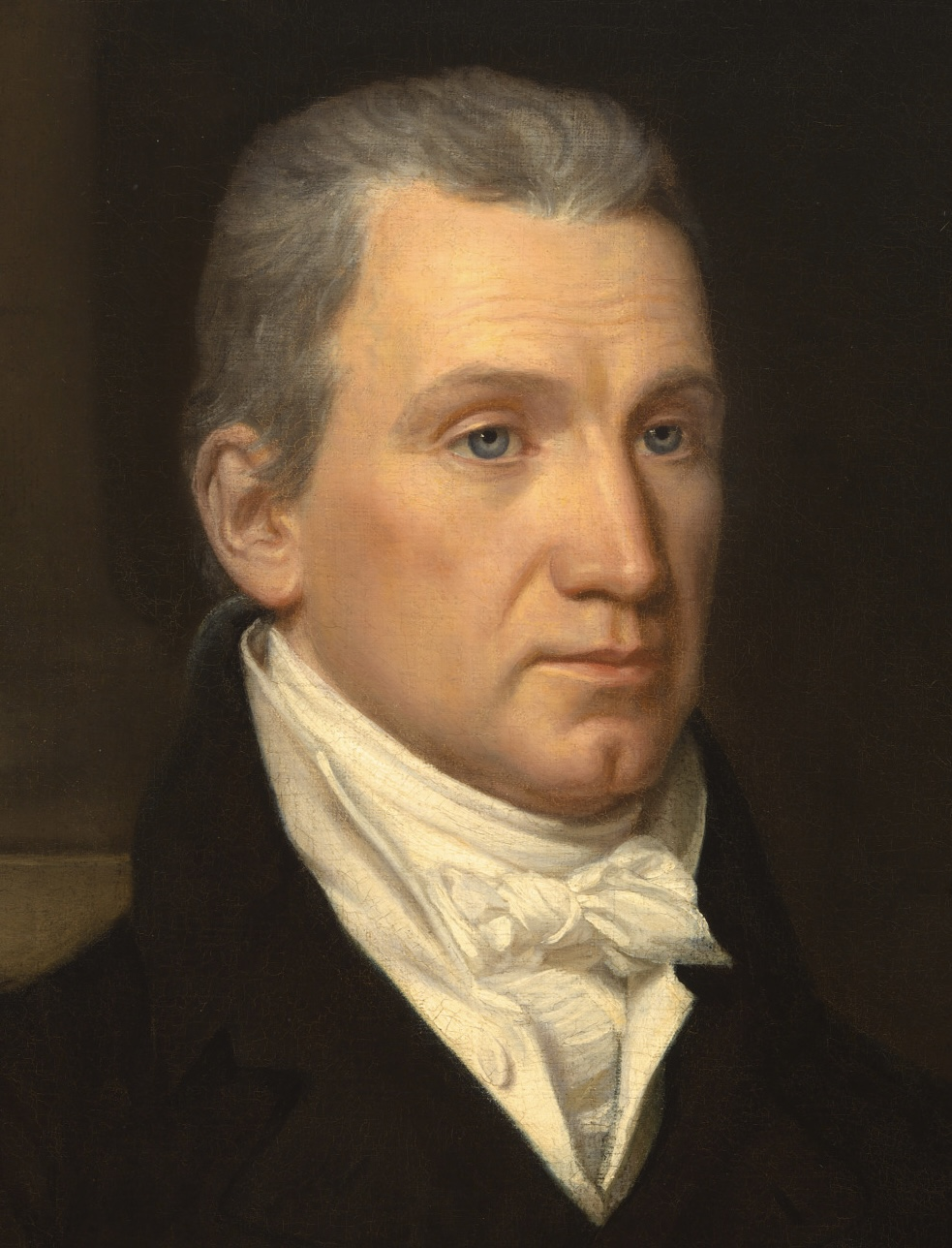

Nominee	James Monroe	Unpledged electors
Party	Caucus	Independent
Alliance	Democratic-Republican	Democratic-Republican
Home state	Virginia
Running mate	Daniel D. Tompkins	N/A (Note: No candidate)
Electoral vote	25	0
Popular vote	25,749	17,597
Percentage	59.4%	40.6%
County results
Monroe
50–60%
60–70%
70–80%
80–90%
>90%
Independent electors
50–60%
60–70%
President before election
James Madison
Democratic-Republican
Elected President
James Monroe
Democratic-Republican

A presidential election was held in Pennsylvania on November 1, 1816, as part of the 1816 United States presidential election. The Caucus ticket of the U.S. secretary of state James Monroe and the governor of New York Daniel D. Tompkins defeated the Independent ticket. The Federalist Party failed to nominate a candidate. In the national election, Monroe easily defeated the senior U.S. senator from New York Rufus King, who received 34 votes from unpledged electors despite not being a candidate.

Monroe secured the Democratic-Republican nomination at the party's quadrennial caucus in March 1816 after the withdrawal of his nearest rival, the U.S. secretary of war William H. Crawford. The caucus passed over the governor of Pennsylvania Simon Snyder in favor of Tompkins as the party's vice presidential candidate. In the aftermath of the caucus, some observers criticized Monroe's nomination by a gathering of party insiders as undemocratic and potentially unconstitutional. A convention of Independent Democrats met at Carlisle, Pennsylvania on September 19–20 and nominated a list of 21 electors in opposition to the Caucus ticket. (Four electors on the Caucus ticket were cross-endorsed by the Carlisle convention.) The Independents did not designate a presidential candidate, although many assumed the electors would vote for DeWitt Clinton. The demoralized Federalist Party did not nominate electors. Many Federalists supported the Independent ticket, while a scattering vote was cast for "truly Federal" electors in three counties.

Monroe's convincing victory in Pennsylvania rendered speculation as to the recipient of the votes of the Independent electors moot. All 25 electors on the Caucus ticket were elected, including the four cross-endorsed by the Carlisle convention. The cooperation of dissident Democrats and Federalists in support of the Independent ticket formed the basis for a coalition of Federalists and Old School Democrats in the 1817 Pennsylvania gubernatorial election.

== Background ==
Following the War of 1812, Pennsylvania Democrats (Note: The state affiliate of the national Democratic-Republican Party was by 1807 increasingly known as the Democratic Party.) were divided between the modernizing New School, with its support for the nationalist economic policies of the American System, and the radical Old School. The most prominent leader of the New School was Governor Simon Snyder, whose allies controlled the regular party and maintained close ties to the Madison administration through their relationship with the U.S. secretary of the treasury Alexander J. Dallas. Snyder's followers advanced a state-centered vision of the Market Revolution, one which paired the development of banking and internal improvements with the extension of political democracy. They maintained an uneasy working relationship with the conservative Quids, who supported Snyder only reluctantly in preference to the Old School. In comparison to the Snyderites, Old School Democrats more strongly resisted the concentration of wealth and power in the hands of an economic elite. They insisted that economic development should be managed democratically and were highly critical of the doctrine of judicial independence, which they associated with the domination of the lower classes by the ascendant bourgeoisie. Led by the radical legislator Michael Leib and the fiery editor of the Philadelphia Aurora William Duane, they courted an alliance with the liberal wing of the Federalist Party in order to break the power of the New School.

Nationally, a political realignment was in the offing, as industrialization and westward expansion introduced new issues in politics. The emergence of a nationalist tendency within the Democratic-Republican Party favoring positive legislation to encourage economic development corresponded to the Federalist turn toward states' rights and strict constructionism following the party's national defeat in 1800. The unpopularity of the Embargo Act and the war with Britain prompted a Federalist resurgence after 1807 and sowed dissension in the Democratic-Republican ranks. In the 1812 United States presidential election, the Federalists exploited divisions within the governing party by endorsing the presidential candidacy of DeWitt Clinton, the candidate of the Democratic-Republicans in the New York General Assembly. The combined support of most Federalists and disaffected Democratic-Republicans for Clinton came close to unseating the incumbent president James Madison, but failure to carry Pennsylvania spelled defeat for the fusionists. National Federalism once again declined following the end of the war, but the party retained a measure of its strength in Pennsylvania, in part due to the split between the New School and the Old School.

== Nominations ==
=== New School (Caucus) Democrats ===
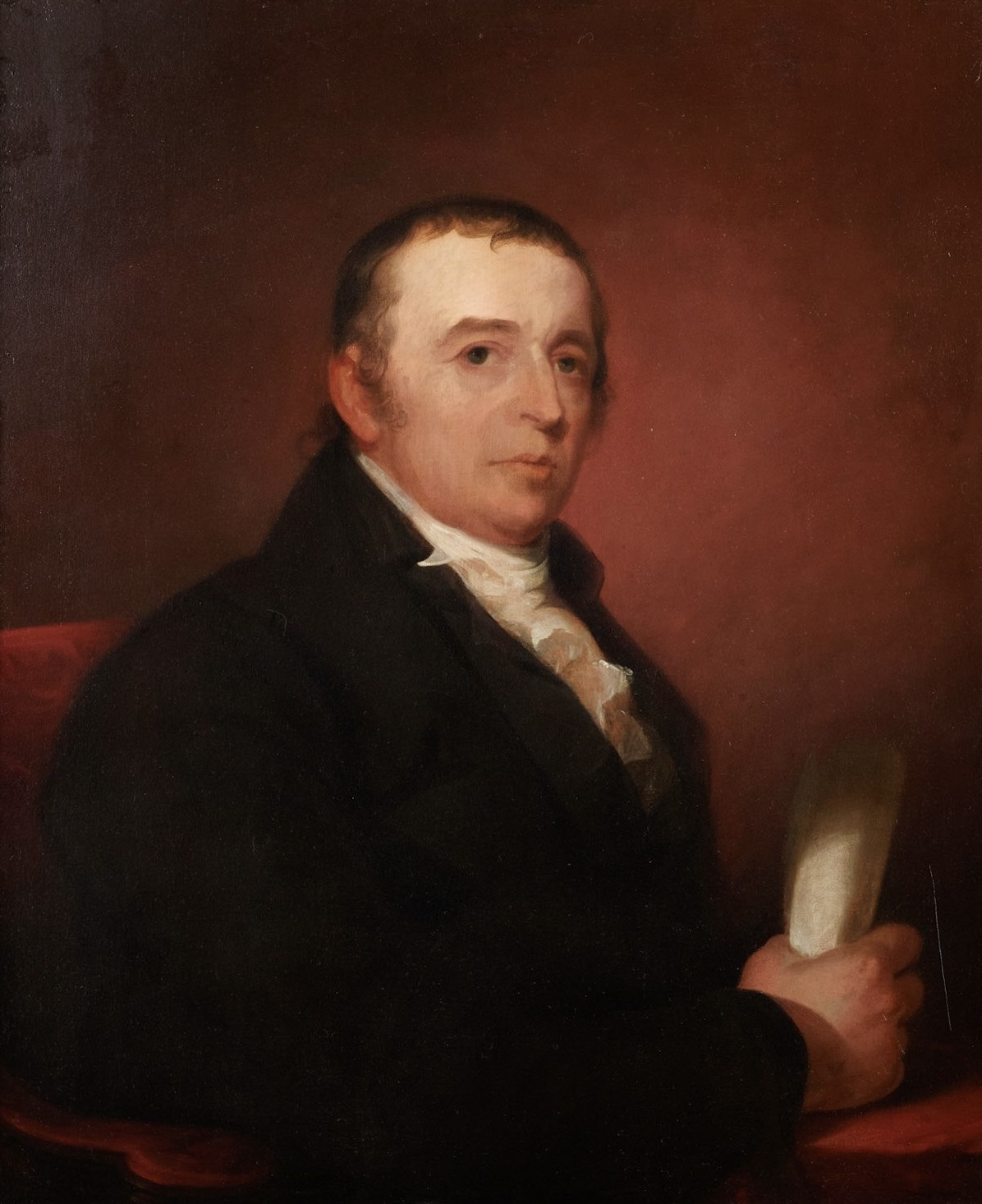
Pennsylvania governor Simon Snyder, New School Democrat and vice presidential hopeful in 1816.

==== Caucus ====
A caucus of Democratic members of the Pennsylvania General Assembly met at Harrisburg, Pennsylvania on March 11, 1816 to nominate electors for the forthcoming presidential election. The Snyderites hoped to use this event to promote Snyder's candidacy for vice president and worked diligently to secure the endorsement of the caucus. Their efforts contrasted with the public apathy of the candidate, who did little to suggest interest in the vice presidency. Despite the personal intervention of the influential editor of the Democratic Press John Binns and the U.S. postmaster for Philadelphia Richard Bache Jr. to lobby legislators to vote for Snyder, enthusiasm for Snyder's candidacy remained conspicuously lacking. The caucus nominated a list of 25 electors but declined to endorse a candidate for vice president.

Snyder suffered a decisive defeat days later when the national caucus of Democratic-Republican members of Congress met at Washington, D.C., garnering 30 votes to 85 for Tompkins on the vice presidential ballot; Monroe defeated Crawford on the presidential ballot by a far narrower margin, 65 to 54. The disappointed Snyderites still held out hope that Tompkins would decline the nomination; when he did not, the Democratic Press announced its support for the national ticket.

==== Nominees ====
1816 Caucus ticket
James Monroe	Daniel D. Tompkins
for President	for Vice President
7th U.S. secretary of state (1811–17)	4th governor of New York (1807–17)
Electors
▌James Alexander ▌Isaac Anderson ▌James Banks ▌William Brooke ▌Daniel Bussier ▌Robert Clarke ▌John Conard ▌Paul Cox ▌Michael Fackenthall ▌Abiel Fellows ▌John Geyer ▌William Gilliland ▌John Harrison (Note: Ran on both the Caucus ticket and the Independent ticket) ▌Gabriel Hiester ▌Jacob Hostetter ▌Joseph Huston ▌David Marchand ▌James Meloy ▌David Mitchell ▌John Mohlar ▌Thomas Patterson ▌John Rea ▌Matthew Roberts ▌Samuel Scott ▌James Wilson

=== Old School (Independent) Democrats ===
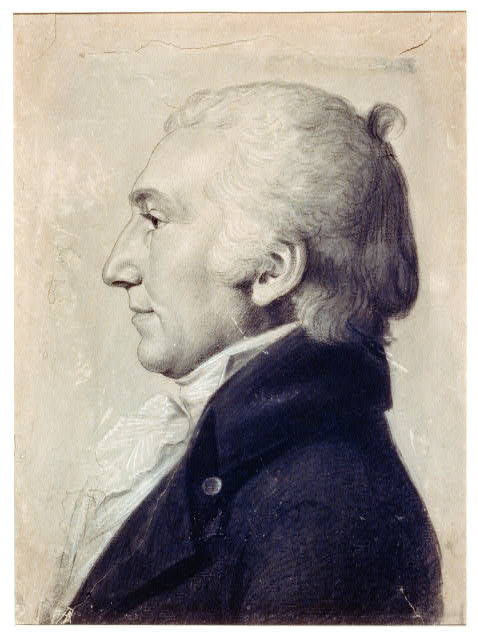
Former U.S. senator Michael Leib, Old School Democrat and Independent electoral candidate from Philadelphia.

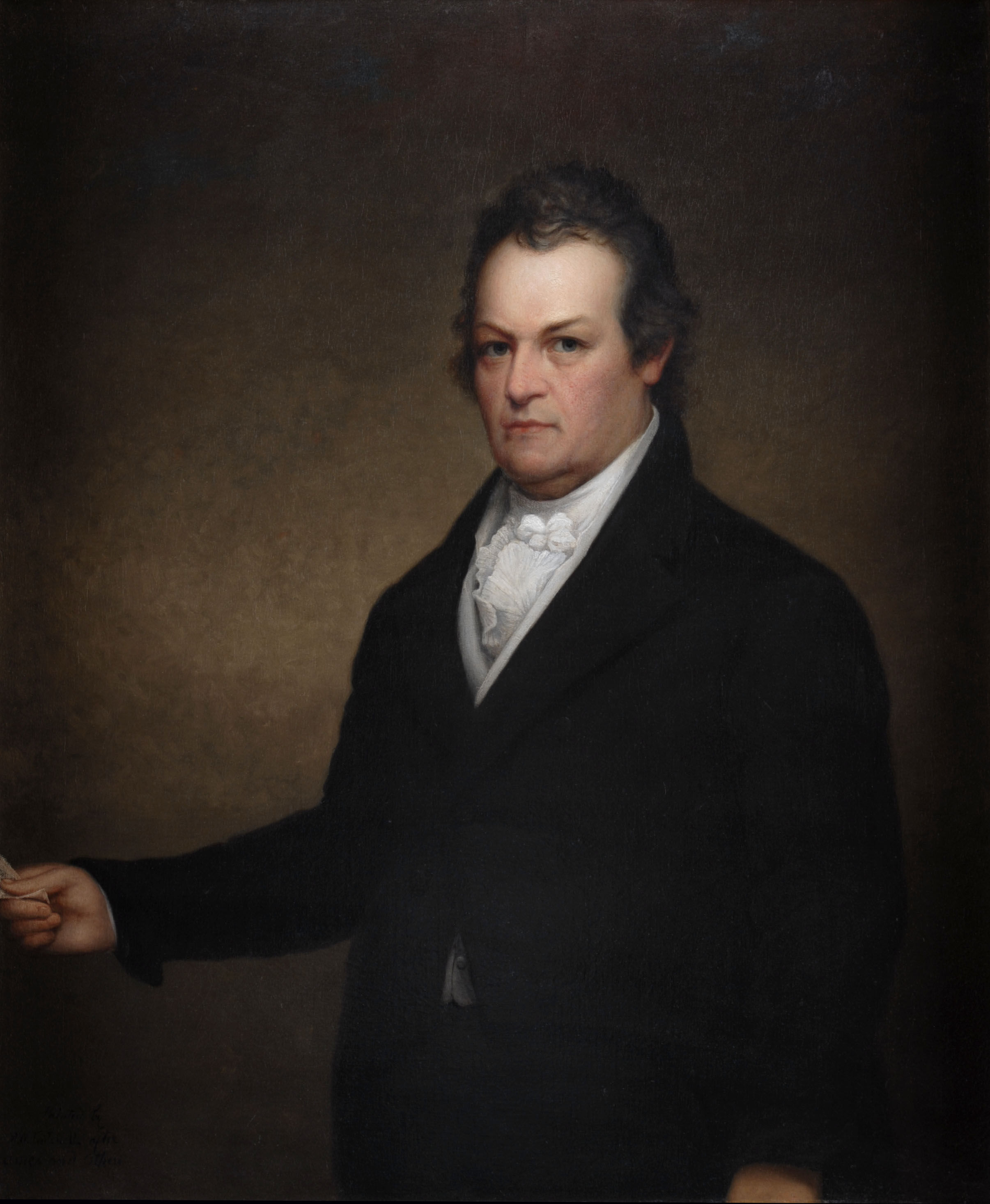
New York governor DeWitt Clinton, considered the favored candidate of many Old School Democrats.

==== Convention ====
The Old School entertained more serious objections to the national ticket. Duane and Leib were on unfriendly terms with the outgoing administration and were not inclined to accept Madison's anointed successor. The Old School had been steadily marginalized over the preceding decade and saw the caucus system as a mechanism for suppressing democratic dissent. Whereas the New School embraced banking and internal improvements, and many Quids shared the nationalist leanings of the administration, the Old School continued to critique economic and political inequality resulting from unrestrained economic development. After the national caucus nomination of Monroe and Tompkins became known, disaffected Old School Democrats announced plans to hold their own convention at Carlisle on September 19, 1816.

The call for the Carlisle convention went out on August 12, 1816 from a Democratic meeting held at Lancaster, Pennsylvania. Many of the organizers had been prominent in support of DeWitt Clinton during the last election, and some suggested the Old School should adopt Clinton as the Independent candidate for president. Eleven delegates representing the counties of Berks, Cumberland, Dauphin, Lancaster, and Philadelphia ultimately met and nominated a list of 25 electors, including four named on the Caucus ticket, without designating a presidential candidate. Having adopted addresses stating the basis of their opposition to the caucus and the Snyderites, the convention adjourned on September 20.

The address of the convention denounced the caucus system as "dangerous," corrupt, undemocratic, and unconstitutional, "disrespectful" and "contemptuous" of the people, "a practice pregnant with mischief, and which, if continued, must be destructive of Liberty." Considering the tendency of the caucus system to "perpetuate an aristocracy of office in certain Men and States," thus "preventing the free and fair selection by the People themselves," the delegates pledged to "never confide in or vote for any person ... who shall hereafter countenance by his presence or vote any Caucus whatever."

Uncertainty surrounded the presidential vote of the Independent electors, who were formally unpledged. Historian Sanford W. Higginbotham infers that the Independents likely would have voted for Clinton and cites correspondence published in the Aurora, the involvement of prominent Clintonians in planning the Carlisle convention, and Leib's visit to Pittsburgh in December 1815 to drum up support for a Clinton candidacy as evidence of this supposition. Contemporary newspapers gave contradictory reports, variously asserting that the Independent ticket was pledged to Monroe, or a stalking horse for Clinton. The Aurora denied that the Independent electors were committed to any candidate. Phil Lampi assumes the Independents would have voted for Crawford or King, although neither man was a candidate when the Carlisle convention met. In fact, of the 25 electors nominated by the Carlisle convention, Thomas Patterson, Joseph Huston, John Harrison, and James Meloy ran jointly on the Caucus ticket, were elected, and voted for Monroe and Tompkins, while Charles Thomson had announced his intention to vote for Clinton as early as August 1816.

==== Nominees ====

1816 Independent ticket

Electors (Note: Unpledged)

▌Henry Alhouse
▌Thomas Baird
▌Robert Bethell
▌Christian Brobst
▌John W. Cunningham
▌Alexander Dysart
▌Patrick Farrelly
▌Andrew Gregg
▌William Hamilton
▌John Harrison
▌Hugh Hart
▌Abraham Horn
▌Joseph Huston
▌Matthew Lawler
▌Michael Leib
▌Robert MacMullin
▌James Meloy
▌Daniel Montgomery Jr.
▌Peter Nagle
▌Thomas Patterson
▌James Poe
▌Joseph Reed
▌John Stroman
▌Charles Thomson
▌Abraham Waggoner

==== Candidates ====
The following electoral candidates not nominated by the Carlisle convention were voted for as Independents and are included in Lampi's A New Nation Votes database.

Candidates in this section are sorted by popular vote from the general election
John Piper	Frederick Keefer	Bernhart Gilbert
Pennsylvania senator from the 12th district (1801–05)		
LE; 259 votes	LE; 46 votes	LE; 44 votes

=== Federalist Party ===
==== Support for the Independent ticket ====
The Federalist Party was considered desirous of an alliance with the Old School. The Snyderites alleged that Pennsylvania Federalists had sponsored Leib's visit to Pittsburg in 1815 to grow support for DeWitt Clinton's candidacy. The October 1816 state elections saw limited cooperation between Old School Democrats and Federalists, resulting in modest gains. Following the Carlisle convention, Philadelphia Federalists and the Gazette of the United States endorsed the Independent ticket. Observers took for granted that most Federalists would vote for the Independent candidates.

==== Truly Federal electors ====
Despite the Philadelphia Federalists' support for the Independents, "truly Federal" electors received a small number of votes in a few counties. Benjamin R. Morgan led the Federalist list in Adams County, which polled 13 votes; in Chester County, a Federalist ticket headed by James Ross received 7 votes; while Isaac Darlington received 7 votes as a Federalist elector in Delaware County.

==== Candidates ====
The following electoral candidates are included in Lampi's A New Nation Votes database.

Candidates in this section are sorted by popular vote from the general election and then alphabetically by last name
Benjamin R. Morgan	Isaac Darlington	James Ross
Pennsylvania senator from the 1st district (1796–97, 1815–1819)	Pennsylvania representative from Chester County (1807–09, 1816)	U.S. senator from Pennsylvania (1794–1803)
LE; 13 votes	LE; 7 votes	LE; 7 votes

== Campaign issues ==
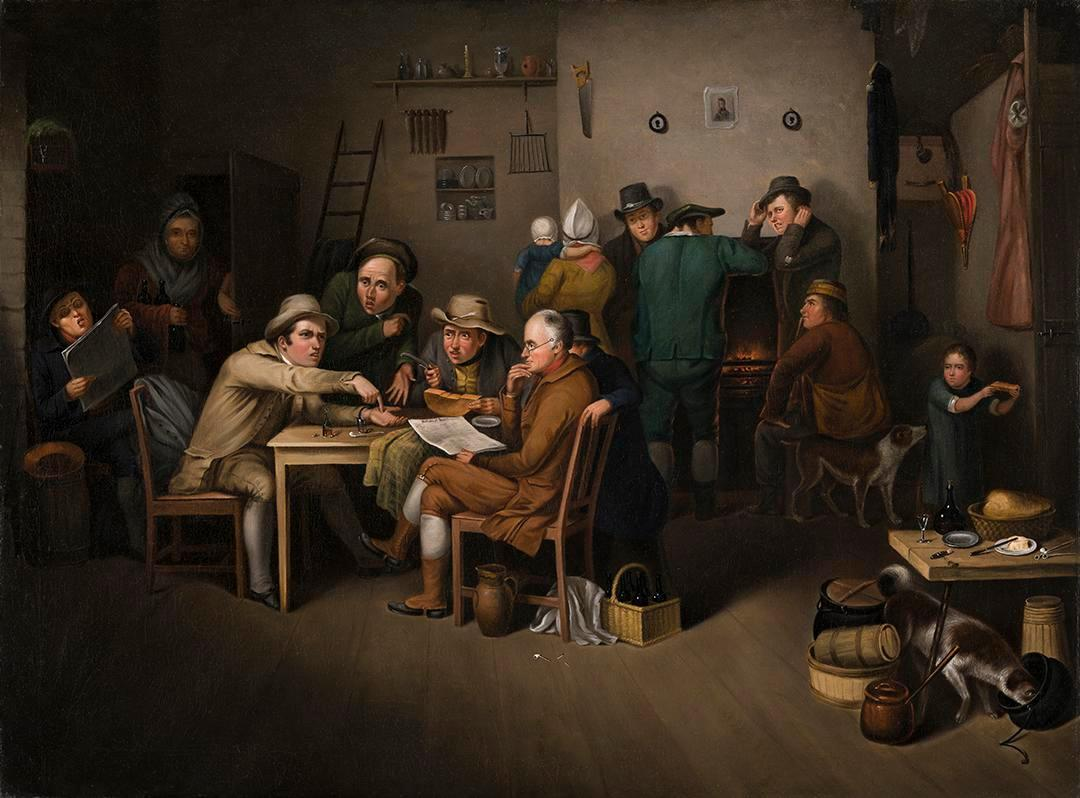
The Village Politicians (1819) by John Lewis Krimmel

=== Caucus system ===
The caucus system was a top issue in the campaign. A gathering of members of Congress selected the Democratic-Republican national ticket in every consecutive election since 1796. Electoral candidates and candidates for state office were commonly chosen by similar gatherings of state legislators. As a matter of convenience, caucuses were held at the seat of government; the March 1816 Democratic-Republican congressional caucus was held at Washington, while the corresponding state caucus of Democratic lawmakers took place at Harrisburg.

By design, the caucus system gave elected lawmakers substantial influence over the choice of party nominees for state and national office. Old School Democrats who by 1816 had been effectively marginalized within the Pennsylvania Democratic Party argued that this practice undermined democratic elections, gave undue influence to career officeholders, and potentially violated the constitutional separation of powers. Although the large body of Federalists and a substantial minority of Democratic-Republicans opposed Monroe's nomination, the caucus system allowed him to run unopposed after the Federalist Party failed to nominate a candidate. Monroe was nominated by less than half the members of Congress, and the Harrisburg Democratic caucus was attended by just 46 of the 126 members of the Pennsylvania General Assembly. For these gatherings to presume to dictate the votes of the electoral colleges was, under the circumstances, "impudent" and "outrageous." The Independents argued that future nominations should be made at conventions by delegates elected specially for that purpose in order to preserve the democratic rights of the electorate and provide a check on the powers of the legislature.

Passage of the infamous Compensation Act in March 1816, coming days after the nomination of Monroe, aided the perception that the caucus proceedings had been controlled by a cabal of career officeholders bent on extending their own power at the expense of the people. The act, which nearly doubled the pay of its members from the existing rate of $6 per diem to a flat $1,500 annual salary, provoked mass public outrage; almost two-thirds of the incumbent members of Congress lost their seats in the ensuing 1816–17 United States House of Representatives elections, forcing Congress to repeal the law in the December lame-duck session. For Old School Democrats, the example of members of Congress voting to raise their own salaries while attempting to control the outcome of the presidential election via the caucus system demonstrated the danger inherent in vesting the power to nominate candidates for office in a meeting of the national legislature.

Defenders of the caucus system argued that elected lawmakers were accountable to their constituents, endowing the caucus nominations with significant democratic legitimacy. They observed that the Carlisle convention was attended by 11 delegates representing five Pennsylvania counties, whereas the congressional caucus was attended by 118 members of Congress representing districts with a combined population of more than 4 million. They asserted the caucus nomination was only a "recommendation" and did not control the votes of Pennsylvanians, as opponents of the caucus claimed. New School Democrats accused the Old School of undermining party unity at a moment when Blue Light Federalists were alleged to be plotting secession.

== General election ==
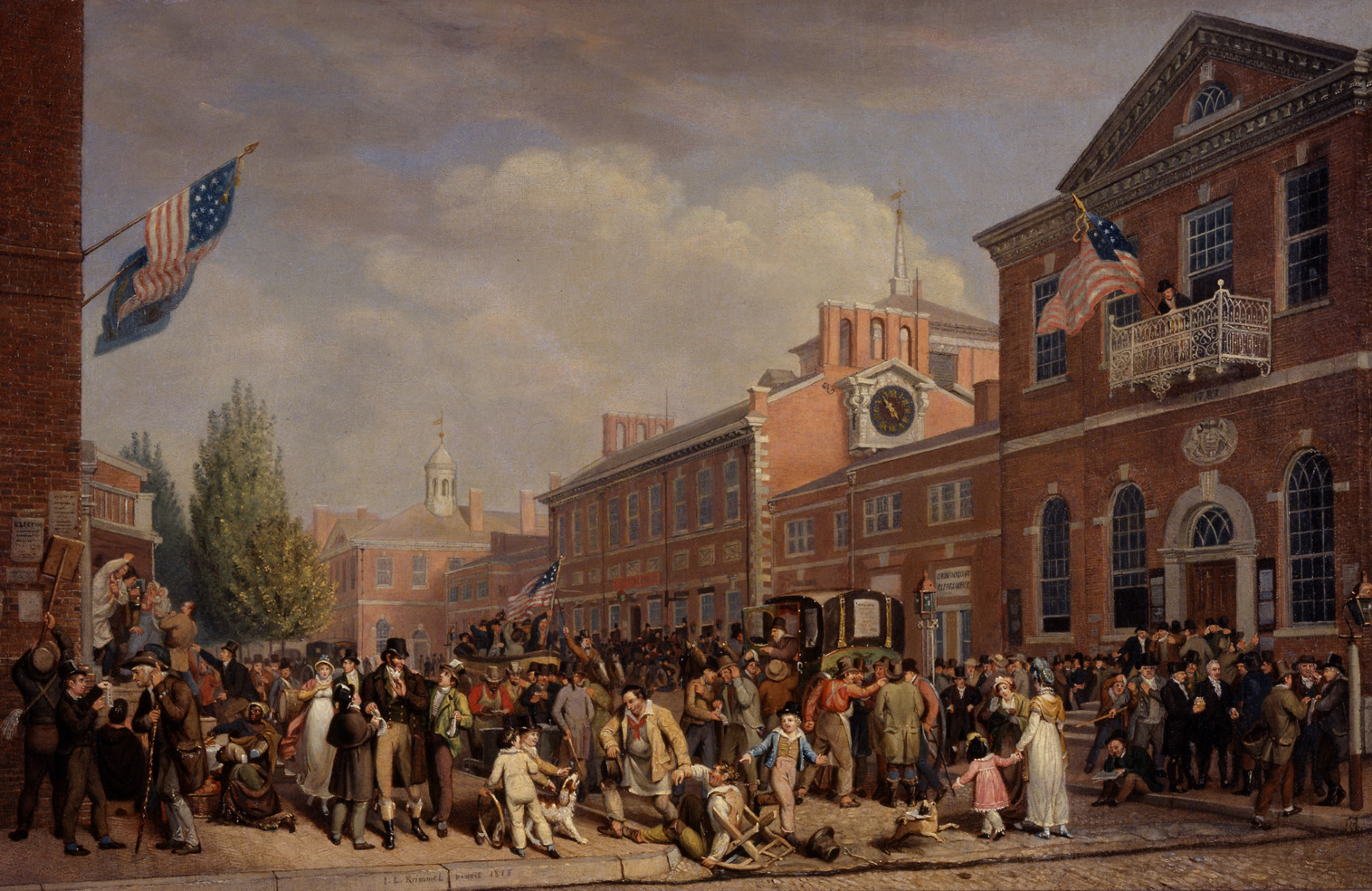
Election Day in Philadelphia (1815) by John Lewis Krimmel

=== Summary ===
Pennsylvania chose 25 electors on a statewide general ticket. Nineteenth century election laws required voters to vote directly for members of the Electoral College rather than for president. This sometimes resulted in small differences in the number of votes cast for electors pledged to the same presidential candidate if some voters did not vote for all the electors nominated by a party, or if one or several electors ran on multiple tickets. In the case of Pennsylvania, four electors ran on both the Caucus and Independent tickets and were elected without opposition; this table compares the votes for the most popular elector on the Caucus ticket (William Gillilland) to the most popular elector on the Independent ticket (Andrew Gregg) to give an approximate sense of the statewide result.

1816 United States presidential election in Pennsylvania
Party	Candidate	Votes	%
Caucus	James Monroe Daniel D. Tompkins	25,749	59.37
Independent	Unpledged electors	17,597	40.57
Federalist	Unpledged electors	27	0.06
Total votes		43,373	100.00

=== Results ===
1816 United States presidential election in Pennsylvania
Party	Candidate	Votes
Fusion	Thomas Patterson	42,945
Fusion	Joseph Huston	42,922
Fusion	John Harrison	42,668
Fusion	James Meloy	41,843
Caucus	William Gilliland	25,749
Caucus	Daniel Bussier	25,735
Caucus	John Mohlar	25,671
Caucus	John Rea	25,620
Caucus	Paul Cox	25,609
Caucus	Abiel Fellows	25,571
Caucus	Gabriel Hiester	25,563
Caucus	Matthew Roberts	25,560
Caucus	William Brooke	25,557
Caucus	James Banks	25,548
Caucus	Michael Fackenthal	25,540
Caucus	Jacob Hostetter	25,504
Caucus	John Geyer	25,484
Caucus	James Wilson	25,484
Caucus	James Alexander	25,473
Caucus	David Marchand	25,447
Caucus	John Conard	25,431
Caucus	David Mitchell	25,424
Caucus	Isaac Anderson	25,421
Caucus	Samuel Scott	25,382
Caucus	Robert Clarke	25,359
Independent	Andrew Gregg	17,597
Independent	Henry Alhouse	17,597
Independent	Joseph Reed	17,580
Independent	Hugh Hart	17,562
Independent	Matthew Lawler	17,558
Independent	Peter Nagle	17,557
Independent	Abraham Horn	17,552
Independent	Abraham Waggoner	17,548
Independent	Christian Brobst	17,503
Independent	Robert MacMullin	17,482
Independent	Charles Thomson	17,457
Independent	John Stroman	17,455
Independent	William Hamilton	17,449
Independent	Patrick Farrelly	17,429
Independent	Michael Leib	17,407
Independent	Alexander Dysart	17,406
Independent	Daniel Montgomery Jr.	17,307
Independent	Robert Bethell	17,285
Independent	Thomas Baird	17,178
Independent	John W. Cunningham	17,140
Independent	James Poe	17,083
Independent	John Piper	259
Independent	Frederick Keefer	46
Independent	Berhart Gilbert	44
Federalist	Benjamin R. Morgan	13
Federalist	Isaac Darlington	7
Federalist	James Ross	7
Total		≥43,373

=== Results by county ===
This table compares the results for the most popular electors running exclusively on the Caucus, Independent, and Federalist tickets, respectively, in each county. The totals presented thus differ slightly from the results summary, which compares the results for the most popular elector pledged to each ticket statewide.

County	James Monroe Caucus		Unpledged electors Independent		Unpledged electors Federalist		Margin		Total
County	Votes	Percent	Votes	Percent	Votes	Percent	Votes	Percent	Total
Adams	205	30.78	448	67.27	13	1.95	-243	-36.49	666
Allegheny	218	32.49	453	67.51	—		-235	-35.02	671
Armstrong	71	45.22	86	54.78	—		-15	-9.56	157
Beaver	180	70.04	77	29.96	—		103	40.08	257
Bedford	423	66.20	216	33.80	—		-207	32.40	639
Berks	1,563	65.56	821	34.44	—		742	31.12	2,384
Bradford	395	82.81	82	17.19	—		313	65.62	477
Bucks	1,789	47.85	1,950	52.15	—		-161	-4.30	3,739
Butler	154	84.15	29	15.85	—		125	68.30	183
Cambria	75	76.53	23	23.47	—		52	53.06	98
Centre	479	66.44	242	33.56	—		237	32.88	721
Clearfield	479	66.44	242	33.56	—		237	32.88	721
Chester	1,999	54.92	1,634	44.89	7	0.19	365	10.03	3,640
Columbia	544	89.47	64	10.53	—		480	78.94	608
Crawford	98	44.14	124	55.86	—		-26	-11.72	222
Cumberland	1,262	70.62	525	29.38	—		737	41.24	1,787
Dauphin	510	66.84	253	33.16	—		257	33.68	763
Delaware	348	42.13	471	57.02	7	0.85	-123	-14.89	826
Erie	85	39.53	130	60.46	—		-45	-20.93	215
Fayette	271	63.17	158	36.83	—		113	26.34	429
Franklin	934	88.03	127	11.97	—		807	76.06	1,061
Greene	140	89.74	16	10.26	—		124	79.48	156
Huntingdon	474	87.13	70	12.87	—		404	74.26	544
Indiana	76	39.79	115	60.21	—		-39	-20.42	191
Jefferson	76	39.79	115	60.21	—		-39	-20.42	191
Lancaster	1,223	45.96	1,438	54.04	—		-215	-8.08	2,661
Lebanon	516	72.27	198	27.73	—		318	44.54	714
Lehigh	596	70.70	247	29.30	—		349	41.40	843
Luzerne	378	54.70	313	45.30	—		65	9.40	691
Lycoming	267	94.01	17	5.98	—		250	88.03	284
McKean	267	94.01	17	5.98	—		250	88.03	284
Potter	267	94.01	17	5.98	—		250	88.03	284
Mercer	131	68.23	61	31.77	—		70	36.46	192
Mifflin	525	82.57	111	17.45	—		414	65.12	636
Montgomery	1,885	60.73	1,219	39.27	—		666	21.46	3,104
Northampton	860	61.60	536	38.40	—		324	23.20	1,396
Northumberland	506	76.32	157	23.68	—		349	52.64	663
Philadelphia	2,834	40.85	4,104	59.15	—		-1,270	-18.30	6,938
Pike	124	77.99	35	22.01	—		89	55.98	159
Schuylkill	340	83.33	68	16.67	—		272	66.66	408
Somerset	251	82.03	55	17.97	—		196	64.06	306
Susquehanna	242	71.60	96	28.40	—		146	43.20	338
Tioga	86	78.90	23	21.10	—		63	57.80	109
Union	522	86.57	81	13.43	—		441	73.14	603
Venango	100	89.28	12	10.71	—		88	78.57	112
Warren	100	89.28	12	10.71	—		88	78.57	112
Washington	489	78.74	132	21.26	—		357	57.48	621
Wayne	82	87.23	12	12.76	—		70	74.47	94
Westmoreland	414	57.42	307	42.58	—		107	14.84	721
York	978	75.40	319	24.59	—		659	50.81	1,297
TOTAL	25,642	59.19	17,655	40.75	27	0.06	7,987	18.44	43,324

=== Electoral college ===
1816 United States Electoral College vote in Pennsylvania
For President				For Vice President			
Candidate	Party	Home state	Electoral vote	Candidate	Party	Home state	Electoral vote
James Monroe	Democratic-Republican	Virginia	25	Daniel D. Tompkins	Democratic-Republican	New York	25
Total			25	Total			25

== See also ==
- United States presidential elections in Pennsylvania

== Bibliography ==
- National Archives and Records Administration (2024). "1816 Electoral College Results". National Archives.
- Higginbotham, Sanford W. (1952). The Keystone in the Democratic Arch: Pennsylvania Politics, 1800–1816. Harrisburg: Pennsylvania Historical and Museum Commission.
- Lampi, Philip J. (n.d.). "Electoral College". A New Nation Votes. American Antiquarian Society.
- Lampi, Philip J. (Summer 2013). "The Federalist Party Resurgence, 1808–1816: Evidence from the New Nation Votes Database". Journal of the Early Republic. 33 (2): 255–81. JSTOR 24768844.
- Lampi, Philip J. (2012). "Pennsylvania 1816 Electoral College". A New Nation Votes. American Antiquarian Society.
- Ratcliffe, Donald J. (2015). The One-Party Presidential Contest: Adams, Jackson, and 1824's Five-Horse Race. Lawrence: University Press of Kansas.
- Ratcliffe, Donald J. (Spring 2014). "Popular Preferences in the Presidential Election of 1824". Journal of the Early Republic. 34 (1): 45–77. JSTOR 24486931.
- Shankman, Andrew (2004). Crucible of American Democracy: The Struggle to Fuse Egalitarianism and Capitalism in Jeffersonian Pennsylvania. Lawrence: University Press of Kansas.
- Siry, Steven Edwin (Winter 1985). "The Sectional Politics of 'Practical Republicanism': De Witt Clinton's Presidential Bid, 1810-1812". Journal of the Early Republic. 5 (4): 441–62. JSTOR 3123061.
- Skeen, Carl Edward (2003). 1816: America Rising. Lexington: University Press of Kentucky.
- Turner, Lynn W. (2002). "Elections of 1816 and 1820". In Schlesinger, Arthur M. Jr.; Israel, Fred L. (eds.). History of American Presidential Elections, 1789–2001. Vol. 1. Philadelphia: Chelsea House Publishers. pp. 298–345.
