= Philadelphia Phoenix =

Philadelphia Phoenix may refer to:

- Philadelphia Phoenix (UFA), an ultimate team in the Ultimate Frisbee Association
- Philadelphia Firebirds (IWFL), a women's football team in the Independent Women's Football League
- Insurance Company of North America Building (Philadelphia), now known as The Phoenix condominiums
