= George Morgan (merchant) =

American merchant and representative to Native Americans

George Morgan (February 14, 1743 – March 10, 1810) was a merchant, land speculator, and United States Indian agent during the American Revolutionary War, when he was given the rank of colonel in the Continental Army. He negotiated with Lenape and other Native American tribes in western Pennsylvania to gain their support during the American Revolutionary War. An associate of the Lenape chief White Eyes, Morgan cared for his son George Morgan White Eyes for several years after White Eyes died.

== Early life and education ==
George Morgan was born in Philadelphia to Evan Morgan, an immigrant from Wales, and Joanna Biles. Like his older brother John Morgan, who became a physician and the co-founder of the University of Pennsylvania Medical College, George was likely educated at the classical Nottingham Academy in Chester County, Pennsylvania. He graduated from the College of New Jersey (Princeton).

== Merchant ==
George Morgan worked as a clerk for John Baynton and Samuel Wharton at the mercantile firm Bayton & Wharton in Philadelphia. After receiving inheritance, he became a junior partner at Baynton, Wharton & Morgan in 1760. In 1764, he married John Baynton's daughter Mary. Enjoying the patronage of Sir William Johnson, Superintendent of Indian Affairs, the firm started to trade with Illinois Country ceded to Great Britain by France after the end of the French and Indian War, using Fort Pitt Trading Post in present-day Pittsburgh as a forward base. Morgan made frequent business trips to the frontier and developed good relations with Native Americans. Lenape made Morgan a member of their tribe naming him Tamanend in honor of one of their great warriors.

== Agent for Indian affairs ==
George Morgan was made an agent for Indian affairs in the Middle Department in 1776, and commissioned on January 8, 1777, as colonel in the Continental Army during the American Revolutionary War. He was assigned to Fort Pitt to oversee diplomacy with Native Americans in the area: Lenape, Shawnee, and others. The American rebels hoped to gain them as allies, or at least convince them to be neutral and not ally with the British. While there Morgan worked closely with the Lenape chief White Eyes; the two became trusted friends.

In 1777 there were allegations made to the Continental Congress against Colonel Morgan that he had collaborated with Alexander McKee and others against the American cause. McKee was the former British deputy Indian superintendent and had escaped from captivity at Fort Pitt. Morgan was cleared of these charges in 1778.

In November 1778, Chief White Eyes accompanied American forces on an expedition against the British at Detroit. He died that month, with the Americans' reporting he had contracted smallpox. Years later Morgan wrote to Congress saying that the American militia had killed White Eyes in Michigan, and that American officials had covered up the murder.

In 1783 Morgan reported on Indian affairs to the Continental Congress, accompanied by White Eyes's 12-year-old son, named George Morgan White Eyes, for whom he was caring. The Congress authorized him to care for the boy for another year. In view of the chief White Eyes's service to the Americans, Morgan helped secure funding from the Continental Congress for the education of George Morgan White Eyes, who matriculated at the College of New Jersey (Princeton University) in 1789.

== Land developer ==
After the Revolution, Morgan explored the Ohio River Valley as he decided to become a land developer and speculator. To his disappointment, in 1784 the United States government claimed much of the territory which he hoped to survey. While in Ohio, he gathered paleontological specimens which he sent to his brother John, an early member of the American Philosophical Society, of which George Morgan was also a member, having been elected to it in 1768.

In 1788, the Spanish Crown offered Morgan a land grant in order to create a colony on the western bank of the Mississippi River, a territory formerly controlled by France as a part of French Louisiana, New France, and ceded to Spain in 1763 after the French and Indian War. In January 1789 - June 1789, Morgan conducted surveying expedition which included Colonel Israel Shreve. The expedition left Pittsburgh on January 3, 1789; traveled down the Ohio and Mississippi River, and arrived at Anse a la Graisse, a Lenape settlement in the Spanish Louisiana Territory, on March 13, 1789. Morgan mapped out a town which he called New Madrid, one mile below the present site of New Madrid, Missouri. He returned to Pittsburgh in June 1789 and continued to negotiate with the Spanish. After a few years, he abandoned his colonization plans.

== Gentleman farmer ==
=== Prospect Farm ===
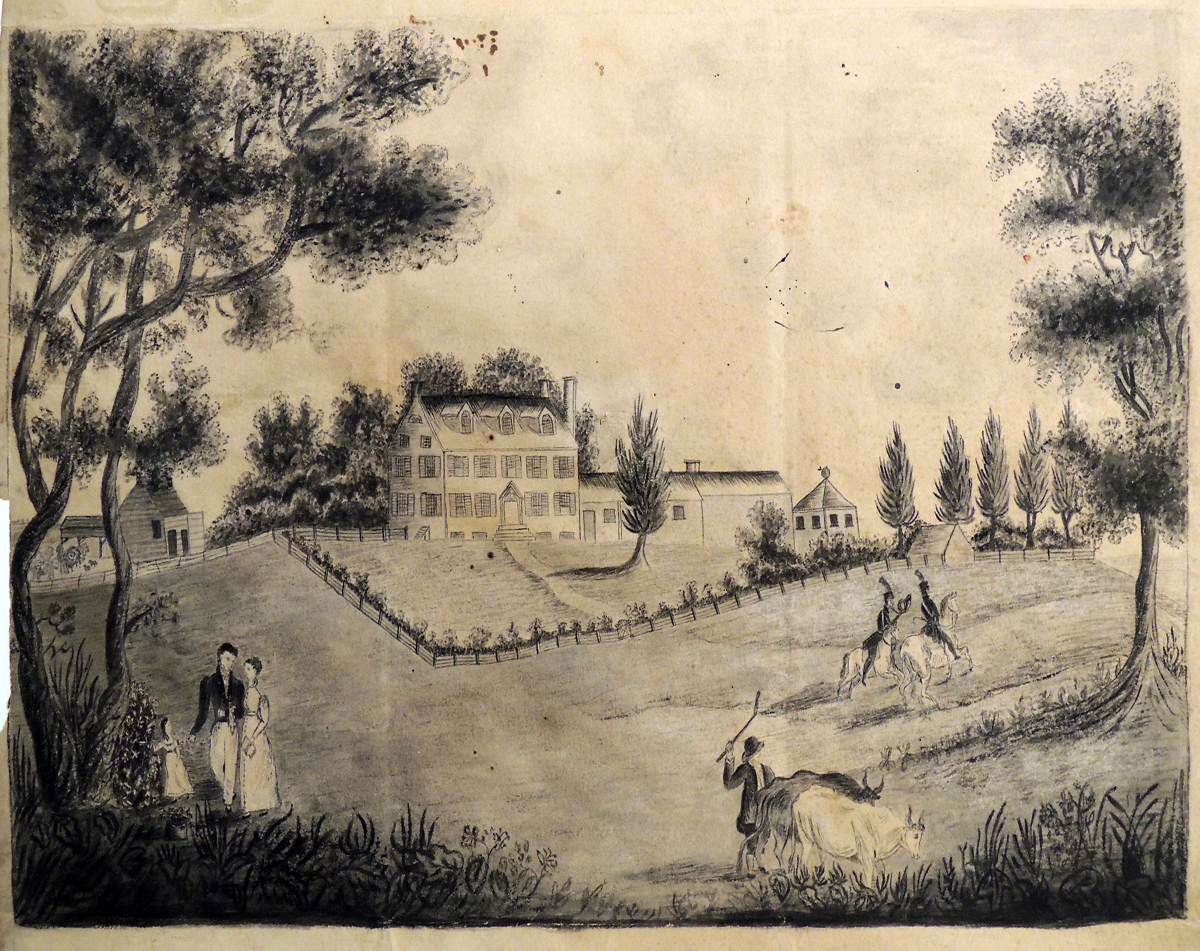
George Morgan's Prospect Farm in 1779

On April 1, 1779, Morgan bought 210 acres of land in Princeton, New Jersey, where he built a stone farmhouse with splendid eastern vista, and named his estate the Prospect Farm. Along with regular farming, he conducted scientific experiments by growing different varieties of corn from various climate zones; maintained a model aviary; developed methods of pest control, in particular, aimed at the hessian fly. In the words of Manasseh Cutler, who visited George Morgan in July 1787, "Here I saw the Hessian fly, as it called, which has done immense injury to wheat. Our country is under much obligation to this gentleman for the discoveries he has made, and the information he has given respecting this insect, in consequence of his experiments. It has enabled the farmers in this part of the country to get rid of an insect that had wholly cut off their crops of grain for several years successively." The Philadelphia Society for Promoting Agriculture awarded to Morgan its first gold medal for improvements in farming.

=== Morganza Farm ===
In 1796, Morgan returned to Pennsylvania as he inherited 600 acres of land in Cecil and Strabane Township along Morganza Road, northeast of Canonsburg in Washington County after the death of his brother John Morgan. On Morganza Farm he continued experimental farming including cultivating grapes.

On August 22, 1806, Morgan was visited by Aaron Burr and his chief of staff Colonel Julien de Pestre at Morganza Farm. Burr's conspiracy to overthrow the federal government was first made known to President Jefferson by Colonel Morgan, who after meeting with Burr wrote Jefferson a letter with warning on September 15. George Morgan and his son Thomas were called to testify at Burr's trial in Richmond, Virginia. In 1947, the Pennsylvania Historical and Museum Commission installed a historical marker near his home in Canonsburg, Pennsylvania, noting Morgan's historic importance. George Morgan died on March 10, 1810, in his Morganza home.

== Family ==
On October 24, 1764, George Morgan married Mary Baynton and they had eleven children; out of them six died in their childhood. Five surviving to adulthood siblings include John, Ann, George, Thomas, and Maria.
