= John Barker (Philadelphia) =

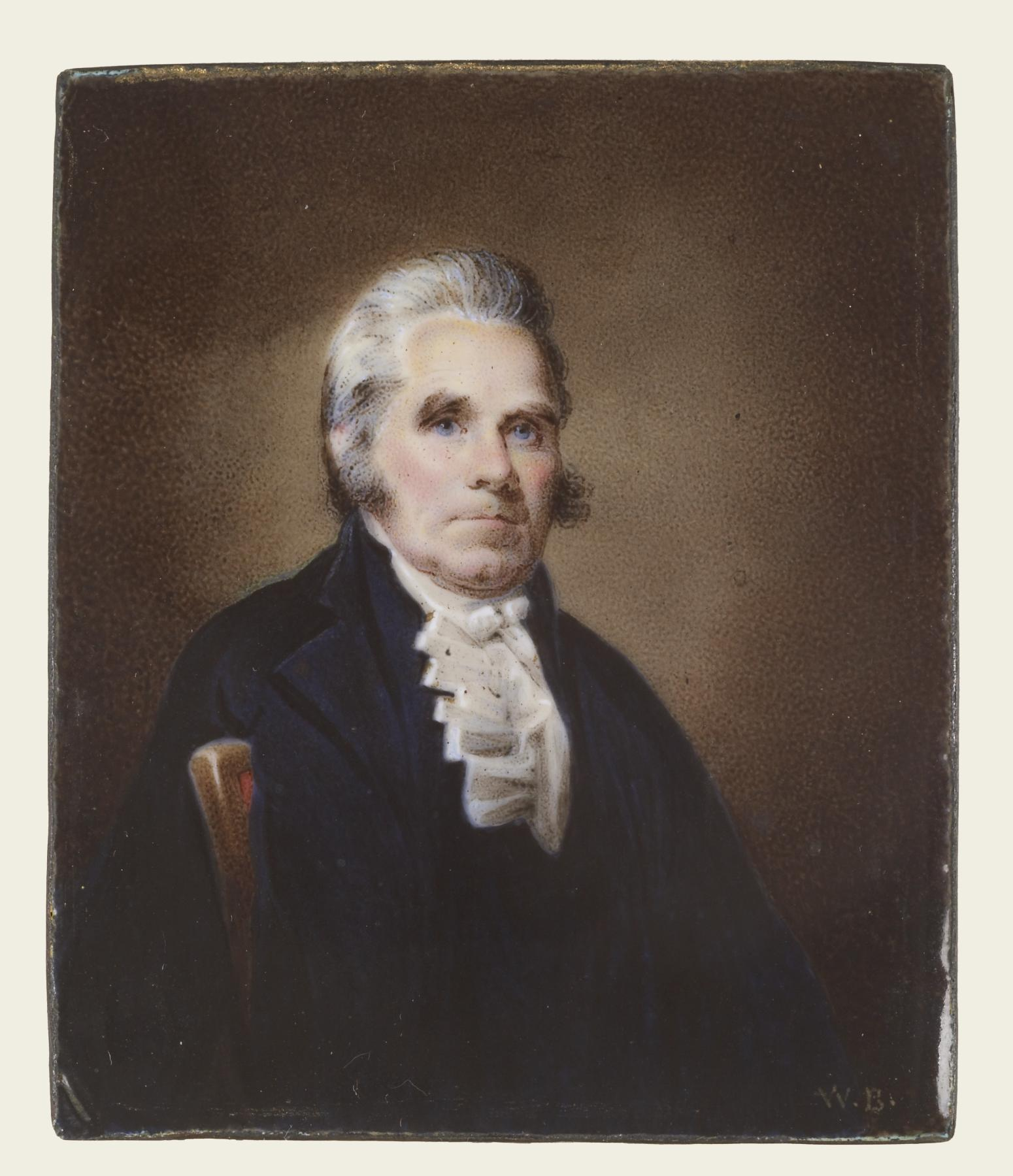

53rd and 56th Mayor of Philadelphia
- In office October 18, 1808 – October 16, 1810
- Preceded by: Robert Wharton
- Succeeded by: Robert Wharton
- In office October 20, 1812 – October 19, 1813
- Preceded by: Michael Keppele
- Succeeded by: John Geyer

Personal details
- Died: Philadelphia, Pennsylvania, U.S.
- Resting place: Laurel Hill Cemetery, Philadelphia, Pennsylvania, U.S.
- Party: Democratic-Republican

Military service
- Allegiance: United States of America
- Years of service: 1777-1808
- Rank: Major General
- Battles/wars: American Revolutionary War

Major General John Barker (c.1746—April 3, 1818) was twice mayor of Philadelphia. He was also a tailor.

Barker served in the Revolutionary War and remained active in the military through 1808, when he retired as Major General of the First Brigade, First Division.

He served twice as sheriff of Philadelphia, from 1794 to 1797 and 1803 to 1807. He was appointed an alderman of the city of Philadelphia by Governor Thomas McKean on October 22, 1800. He was elected mayor by the Select and Common Councils on October 20, 1808, and was re-elected in 1809 and again, after an interval of two years, in 1812.

During the War of 1812, he served on the city's Committee of Defense.

He died in Philadelphia at age 72. His original interment is unknown but his remains were reinterred to Laurel Hill Cemetery in Philadelphia.

== Family ==
He was the only son of James Barker. He was the father of playwright James Nelson Barker, who served in the army during the War of 1812, rising to the rank of major, and who was also later mayor of Philadelphia.

Political offices
Preceded by Robert Wharton (Philadelphia)	Mayor of Philadelphia; 1808–1810	Succeeded by Michael Keppele
Preceded by Robert Wharton (Philadelphia)	Mayor of Philadelphia; 1812–1813	Succeeded by John Geyer
