= John Inskeep =

American politician (1757–1834)

John Inskeep (January 29, 1757 – December 18, 1834) was a mayor of Philadelphia, Pennsylvania, serving twice, from 1800 to 1801 and from 1805 to 1806.

He was born on January 28, 1757, on his family's homestead near the Marlton section of Evesham Township, New Jersey.

As a member of the New Jersey militia, he took part in the Battle of Princeton and other engagements.

On October 20, 1800, he was elected mayor of Philadelphia, succeeding Robert Wharton, who had been reelected but declined to serve. From 1802 to 1805, he served as an Associate Judge of the Common Pleas.

In 1802, he was elected a director of the Insurance Company of North America, of which he served as president from 1806, on the death of Charles Pettit, to 1831, when he retired because of ill health.

He died in Philadelphia on December 18, 1834, where he is buried in Christ Church Burial Ground.

Political offices
| Preceded by Robert Wharton | Mayor of Philadelphia; 1800–1801 | Succeeded by Matthew Lawler |
| Preceded by Matthew Lawler | Mayor of Philadelphia; 1805–1806 | Succeeded by Robert Wharton |
