= James Nelson Barker =

American dramatist (1784–1858)

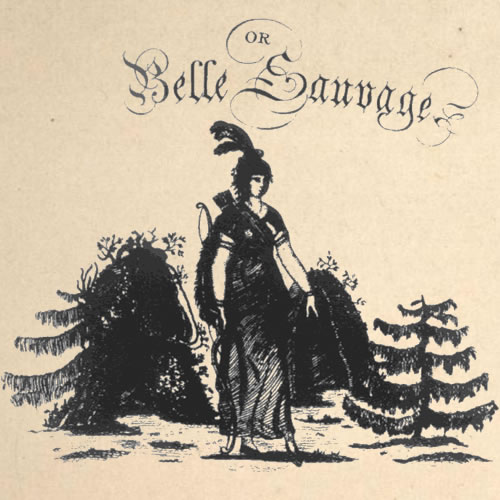
Cover to John Bray's score of The Indian Princess, or La Belle Sauvage.

James Nelson Barker (June 17, 1784 – March 9, 1858) was an American soldier, playwright and politician. He rose to the rank of major in the Army during the War of 1812, wrote ten plays, and was mayor of Philadelphia.

== Early life ==
Barker was born on June 17, 1784, in Philadelphia. He was the fourth son of John Barker, and Mary Nelson, who were married on July 13, 1769. His education was limited, for though he attended local schools, he spent more time reading books than studying. However, Barker's father ensured that his son was educated in gentlemanly etiquette and the ability to defend himself with a sword or pistol. Barker began writing in 1804. The Spanish Rover was a three-act play based on Cervantes. However, only one act was completed, and eventually burned. His studies were also challenged by travel. He joined an expedition to the West Indies in 1806, much to his parents' unease. His first produced play, Tears and Smiles (1807), was a social comedy. It premiered on March 4, 1807, at The Chestnut Street Theater in Philadelphia. His next play, The Embargo; or, What News? (1808), was a drama about the Embargo Acts of December 22, 1807, and February 19, 1808, which forbade vessels to engage in foreign trade. Barker was a lifelong Democrat, and his father John was a mayor of the city from 1808 to 1809.

In September 1808, Barker joined "The Democratic Young Men", a Philadelphia political organization. His involvement in the organization led to his naming as a member of vigilance to supervise the voting at the election, which led to the Democratic control of councils. This control then led to his father's second term as mayor of the city from 1812 to 1813. In 1809, 25-year-old Barker was sent by his father to Washington to gain political experience and to prepare for a political career. This visit served both to train him in politics and to give him political contacts, as he was invited to meet with James Madison. In 1811, Barker married Mary Rogers. His daughter, Rachel Jackson Mary Barker, was named after Andrew Jackson's wife Rachel Jackson.

== Literary influence ==
Barker's plays show awareness of the problems with the government's attitude that it was the center of the new America's society. He sought to demonstrate that the American experience could be used to shape national identity. He considered himself to be an American playwright who was committed to exploring native subjects and themes. His work reflected the conflict for American authors in finding their own native voice. He believed that American artistic tastes should be independent of those of Europe, and condemned Americans' feelings of inferiority. He took the position that American art was to be both democratic and useful. Two of Barker's most popular plays were The Indian Princess and Marmion. Superstition is considered one of Barker's best plays.

=== The Indian Princess ===
The Indian Princess; or, La Belle Sauvage (1808), is a melodrama about the Pocahontas story. Though originally written as a play, Barker decided to turn it into an operatic melodrama, collaborating with the English John Bray, who wrote the music. It is the first play that survives in its entirety with Native American characters (Ponteach from 1766, for example, was a play about Native Americans that was never produced). It was also the first original American play to be produced in London after being premiered in America. However, according to the American music scholar H. Wiley Hitchcock, the London production was "a bowdlerized version" of the original. In a letter of June 10, 1832, to William Dunlap, Barker said that the London production at Drury Lane "differs essentially from mine in the plan and arrangement". It was premiered at The Chestnut Street Theatre in Philadelphia. It is based on Captain John Smith's Generall Historie of Virginia (1624), though he used Smith's text freely. Its New York premiere was at the Park Theatre on June 14, 1809. It satisfied intrigue for both American and English audiences regarding the figure of the Native American. Even though romantic conquest takes precedence over colonial conquest, it is evident that the connection between the two is strong. The Indian Princess gained popularity due to a search for a national identity, as American history was becoming more popular. As Susan Scheckel wrote, "In bringing Pocahontas to the popular stage, James Nelson Barker enlisted the conventions of melodrama to produce a romanticized version of American history that resolved conflicts implicit in past acts of conquest and revolution and defined national identity in terms that reinforced a sense of moral and cultural integrity." Though historical accuracy is overshadowed by romantic melodrama, Barker was aware that that was what his audience wanted, as they were accustomed to romantic melodramas from England. As Jeffrey H. Richards noted, "In Barker, the Native Americans are identified specifically with a history of the North American mainland and a people that spectators in 1808 would easily identify as Indian." A common practice of the time was to add music to performances, whether in song or not. Because of the music, audiences flocked to it.

=== Marmion ===
Marmion; or, The Battle of Flodden Field (1812), was premiered in New York at the Park Theatre on April 13, 1812. It is a blank-verse dramatization of Sir Walter Scott's poem Marmion. It was premiered in New York because there was already a production in Philadelphia with the same name at the Olympic Theatre. Marmion had its Philadelphia premiere on January 1, 1813. Though it is set in sixteenth century England and Scotland, it addressed nineteenth century America and its relationship with England regarding a heated debate with Congress about the imprisonment of American seamen. It was initially purposefully attributed to the English dramatist Thomas Morton, out of fear of disregard for a play by an American. It was believed that when the true playwright was revealed, ticket sales would drop. However, according to the diary of William Wood, who requested that Barker write the play, the ticket sales were as follows:

Jan. 1, 1813, $1414.75
Jan. 2, $357.25
Jan. 11, $578
Jan. 18, $845
Feb. 5, $332
Feb. 15, $466.

According to Wood, the truth was revealed after the sixth or seventh performance. Ticket sales remained constant, and Marmion was one of the longest running dramas of Barker's career. By the time Marmion premiered in Philadelphia, Barker had gone to the Canada–US border as captain of the Second Artillery Regiment.

=== Superstition; or, The Fanatic Father ===
Superstition, or, The Fanatic Father (1824) was first staged on the Chestnut Street Theatre in Philadelphia on March 12, 1824. Superstition is a melodrama written during the Romantic movement that took form in America in the early 1800s. According to Allan Gates Halline in his introduction to Superstition in American Plays, "The appeal to reason and knowledge suggest that Barker was reflecting the rationalistic thought current shortly before and partly during the period in which he was writing." The setting of Superstition takes place in the Puritans' Massachusetts Bay Colony in the early 17th-century. The play's protagonist, Charles Fitzroy, and his mother, Isabella, are unfairly condemned by the town's Puritan leader, Reverend Ravensworth. After the New England town defends itself from a Native American raid, Charles and Isabella are put on trial and are executed for supposed witchcraft. Superstition addresses the hypocritical practices of the Puritans as well as glorifying American exceptionalism. While this melodrama does follow many of the common tropes and character archetypes for which 19th-century melodrama was known, Barker subverts many of these expectations by including a tragic ending where the protagonist dies and the antagonist goes unpunished. According to John Gassner's introduction to Superstition in Best American Plays, "[Superstition] was also the culmination of Baker's most distinguishing characteristics, as a playwright—namely, his concern with American subjects and problems."

== 1812-1819 ==
Barker served as a soldier in the War of 1812. He was appointed captain in the Second Regiment of Pennsylvania Artillery on May 26, 1812, by William Eustis, Secretary of War. In 1814, he was severely wounded in a duel. He was shot in both legs by Major Wade Hampton, father of the Confederate general, and he was incapacitated from active service for several years. He was appointed major when he was made assistant adjutant general of the 4th Military District by President Madison on April 8, 1814. He was honorably discharged in June 1815. After discharge, he returned to Philadelphia, where he continued working in politics, as well as writing and supporting theater. Between 1815 and 1817, he wrote reviews for the Chestnut Street Theatre and he was a trustee of the Theatrical Fund for Indigent Actors. Barker wrote his next drama, The Armourer's Escape; or, Three Years at Nootka Sound, in 1817. It was based on the real-life adventures of John Jewitt, who played himself at the premiere. Though the playbill has survived, the two-act melodrama has not. It was premiered on March 21, 1817. His next piece, An oration delivered at Philadelphia Vauxhall Gardens, on the forty-first anniversary of American independence, was published in 1817, printed by John Binns (Philadelphia). In spring 1817, Barker took his father's seat on the Philadelphia board of Aldermen. In 1819, Barker was elected Mayor of Philadelphia. As mayor, he was known for being fair, speaking out against slavery, raising funds for local charities and sending aid to Savannah after the city was hurt by a devastating fire.

== Later life ==
After his term as mayor had ended, he continued to write. Superstition; or, The Fanatic Father (1824), is a tragedy, produced at the Chestnut Street Theatre in 1824 with Mary Ann Duff as Mary. According to historian Arthur Hobson Quinn, the plot revolves around "Puritan refugee Goff, issuing from his solitude to lead the villagers to victory against the Indians. With this theme he interwove that of the intolerance of the New England Puritans and their persecution for witchcraft."

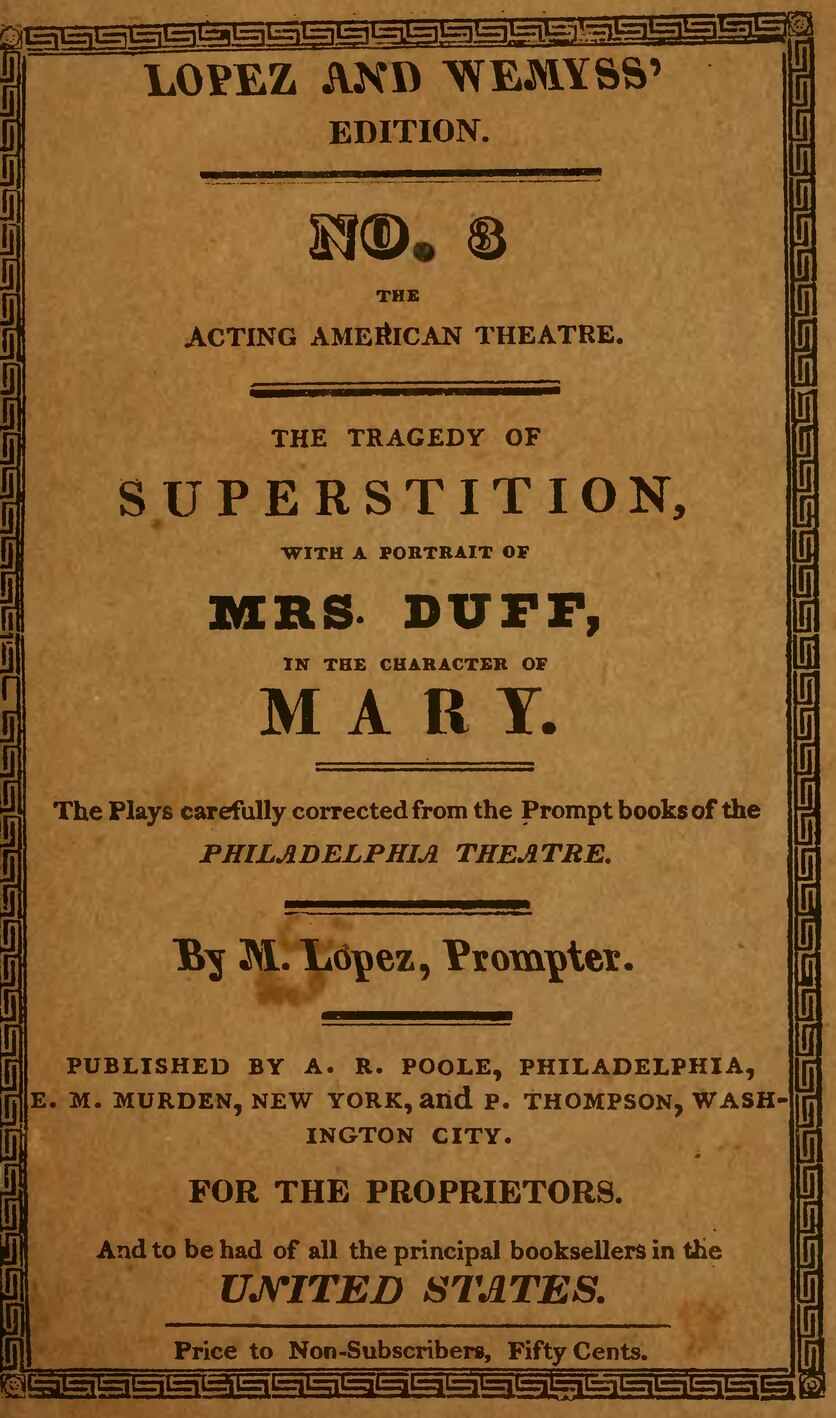
Superstition poster

His play, How to Try a Lover, was written in 1817, but was not produced until 1836 as The Court of Love. It was premiered in Philadelphia on March 26, 1836, at the Arch Street Theatre. It is a dramatic adaptation of the French picaresque novel, La folie espagnole, by Pigault-Lebrun (1753–1835). Barker wrote, "It was the only drama I have written with which I was satisfied." However, Barker felt he could better serve society as a politician than a dramatist. He was unable to combine his political and literary roles, which led to him seeing himself as primarily a politician and an author second. He turned his focus from writing plays to writing political tracts, commemorative poems and local history between 1818 and 1858. His non-fiction works include A Sketch of Primitive Settlements on Delaware River (1827) and contributions to the columns of many Democratic journals during the Bank War and Panic, from 1832 to 1836 which were highly valued. In addition to writing, from 1829 to 1838, Barker was the collector of the port of Philadelphia, and from 1841 to 1858, he was the assistant comptroller of the U.S. Treasury. He was involved in the presidential campaigns for both Jackson and Van Buren during the 1820s and 1830s. He died in 1858 of pneumonia in Washington, D.C. He was interred at Laurel Hill Cemetery in Philadelphia.

== Legacy ==
Barker's literary work advocated native dramas and emphasized a growing desire among American writers to claim the nation's early history. His plays are set in America, which was unusual for that period, and he is considered to be among the first generation of American playwrights. He knew that his plays could shape national identity by creating an independent American consciousness. Quoted in the Philadelphia Democratic Press, Barker believed that theatre had a higher goal, "to keep alive the spirit of freedom; and to unite conflicting parties in a common love of liberty and devotedness to country".

Political offices
Preceded by Robert Wharton (Philadelphia)	Mayor of Philadelphia; 1819–1820	Succeeded by Robert Wharton (Philadelphia)
