= Joseph Wharton (1707–1776) =

American merchant (1707–1776)

Joseph Wharton (born in Philadelphia, Pennsylvania, August 4, 1707; died there on July 27, 1776) was a merchant in colonial America. He was called "Duke Wharton" for his stately bearing. He owned "Walnut Grove," a mansion on Fifth Street near Washington Avenue. Deemed the finest of its day near Philadelphia, the house hosted the Mischianza of 1778 and was torn down in 1862 to make room for a schoolhouse.

== Family ==
Wharton was the uncle of Pennsylvania governor Thomas Wharton Jr. and father of Continental Congressman Samuel Wharton, Philadelphia mayor Robert Wharton, and United States Marine Corps commandant Franklin Wharton. He married Hannah Carpenter (1711–1751) and after her death Hannah Owen (1720–1791), a widow.

Joseph Wharton; 1st marriage, Philada. March 5, 1729–30, Hannah, daughter of John Carpenter, by his wife, Ann Hoskins. She was born in Philada, Nov. 23, 1711, and deceased on July 14, 1751. He married secondly, on June 7, 1752, with Hannah, widow of John Ogden, and daughter of Robert Owen, by his wife, Susannah Hudson. She was born in Philadelphia on March 16, 1720–1, and died in Jan. 1791.

By his 1st wife he had eleven children, all born in Philadelphia.

1. Thomas (b. Jan. 15, 1730–1); m. Rachel Medcalf.
2. Samuel (b. May 3, 1732); m. Sarah Lewis.
3. Joseph (b. March 21, 1733–4); m. Sarah Tallman.
4. Rachel (b. June 7, 1736); bu. Jan. 6, 1736–7).
5. John (b. Jan. 17, 1737–8; d.-1770).
6. William (b. March 12, 1740); m. Oct. 15, 1767, Susannah, daughter of Jacob Medcalf by his wife Susannah Hudson, b. June 6, 1734, He d. s. p. Will proved, Philada. Jan. 21, 1805.
7. George (b. March 13, 1741–2; bu. March 17, 1741–2).
8. Charles (b. Jan. 11, 1743–4); m. 1st, Jemima Edwards; 2dly, Elizabeth Richardson; and 3dly, Hannah Redwood.
9. Isaac (b. Sept. 15, 1745; March 31, 1808); m. Margaret Rawle.
10. Carpenter (b. Aug. 30, 1747; d. April 6, 1780); m. Elizabeth Davis, who d. May, 1816. They married in Christ Church, April 13, 1771.
11. Benjamin (b. Feb. 12, 1749–50; d. Sept. 8, 1754).
