= Michael Keppele =

American politician and lawyer in the 19th century

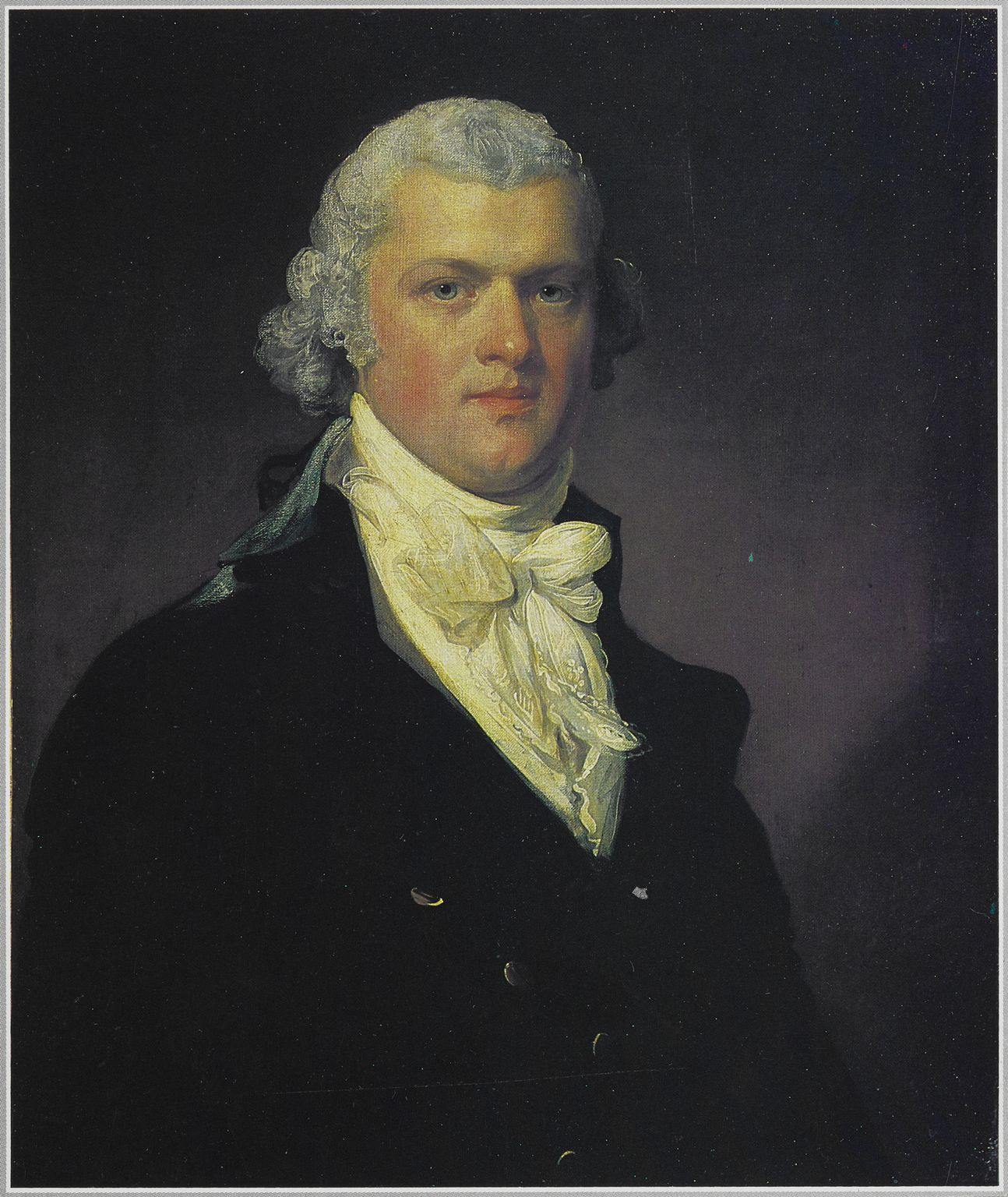
- portrait by Gilbert Stuart
- Spouse: Catherine Caldwell Keppele

Michael Keppele (September 9, 1771 – February 2, 1821) was a lawyer, alderman, and mayor of Philadelphia, 1811–1812.

Graduated from the University of the State of Pennsylvania (now the University of Pennsylvania) in 1788. He was admitted to the Philadelphia bar on September 18, 1792. In 1806, he became an alderman, replacing Michael Hillegas. He was elected mayor on October 15, 1811, and served a one-year term.

He died in Philadelphia.

== Family ==
He married Catherine Caldwell (June 7, 1774 – August 23, 1862).

Their daughter Sarah Caldwell Keppele (1789–1877) married James Cornell Biddle (1795–1838), of the Philadelphia Biddle family in 1825. He was son of revolutionary war soldier Clement Biddle (1740–1814).

Political offices
Preceded by Robert Wharton (Philadelphia)	Mayor of Philadelphia; 1811–1812	Succeeded by John Barker (Philadelphia)
