= John Baynton =

American businessman (1726–1773)

John Baynton (17 December 1726 – 8 May 1773) was a Philadelphia merchant.

== Early life ==
Born in Philadelphia to an influential mercantile family, John Baynton followed in his father's footsteps and entered into the same profession at an early age. He then married Elizabeth Chevalier, sister of Young Junto member Peter Chevalier, in 1747.

== Career ==
He served in the Pennsylvania Assembly, and became Provincial Commissioner in 1756. He also served as a Trustee of the State House and of Province Island. In 1763, Baynton organized a firm alongside fellow businessman Samuel Wharton, and Baynton's son-in-law, George Morgan: the three formed Baynton, Wharton, and Morgan. The firm dealt mainly with the trade of sugar, beer, cordwood, and foodstuffs, and had set up a trading post at Fort Pitt. Virtually dominating the Western-frontier trade market through sometimes unsavory business practices, the firm's success did not last long. Ultimately, Baynton, Wharton, and Morgan became bankrupt and merged with another firm to form the Indiana Company.

In 1771, John Baynton was elected as a member of the American Philosophical Society.

The company negotiated two and half million acres of land away from the Six Nations. The Crown withheld approval of the land grant, and Wharton went to London to negotiate on behalf of his firm. The outcome of Wharton's lobbying excluded Morgan and Baynton from the newly formed Grand Ohio Company (also known as the Walpole Company) which obtained the land grant. The subsequent feud between Wharton and his former partners allegedly led to Baynton's untimely death, brought on by the stress of the matter.
