= Insurance Company of North America =

American stock insurance company

- Type: Private
- Industry: Insurance
- Founded: November 19, 1792 in Philadelphia, Pennsylvania
- Parent: Chubb Limited

Insurance Company of North America (INA) is the oldest capital stock insurance company in the United States, founded in Philadelphia in 1792. It was one of the largest American insurance companies of the 19th and 20th centuries before merging with Connecticut General Life to form CIGNA in 1982, and was acquired by global insurer ACE Limited (currently Chubb Limited) in 1999.

== 1792–1794 ==
In 1792, Boston merchant Samuel Blodget moved to Philadelphia. He did so in part to seek a commission from President George Washington as superintendent of construction for the new federal city then being built along the Potomac River (an amateur architect, Blodget would later design the First Bank of the United States building in Philadelphia), but also to collaborate on a business venture with former U.S. Postmaster General Ebenezer Hazard, who owned a counting house in the city.

Hazard had previously invested in an idea of Blodget's called the Boston Tontine, a sort of early annuity fund that also acted as a lottery for the last surviving investor. It failed, but Blodget and Hazard decided to try again in Philadelphia, then the largest city in North America. They called their new attempt the Universal Tontine Association and this time gave it a 21-year lifespan, after which the association would disband and the surviving investors would split what remained of the fund.

The Universal Tontine Association also failed to generate the hoped-for interest. In November 1792, its investors met at the Pennsylvania State House (today Independence Hall) to decide what to do with their fund. On November 12, they adopted a proposal to form a general insurance company, to be called the Insurance Company of North America. On November 19, the investors adopted articles of association, giving the company the ability to write fire, life, or marine insurance, though initially the investors would focus solely on marine.

The company started with $600,000 capital, selling shares at $10 each. Investors subscribed to the first 40,000 shares in eleven days, and on December 10, they met again at the State House to elect directors. The directors held their first board meeting the next day, at Philadelphia's City Tavern. There, they elected merchant and underwriter John Maxwell Nesbitt as president and Hazard as secretary. On December 15, the company opened for business at 119 (now 223) South Front Street. The first policy was issued to Nesbitt's mercantile firm, Conyngham, Nesbitt & Co., for the ship America on its voyage from Philadelphia to Derry.

On December 18, the company petitioned the Pennsylvania legislature for a charter of incorporation. Due to opposition from private underwriters and others, the legislature took over a year to approve the petition; Governor Thomas Mifflin signed the charter incorporating INA on April 14, 1794.

== 1794–1850 ==
Soon after incorporating, INA entered the field of fire insurance. While Philadelphia already had two fire insurance companies—The Philadelphia Contributionship for the Insurance of Houses from Loss by Fire (1752) and the Mutual Assurance Company for Insuring Houses from Loss by Fire in and near Philadelphia (1784)—INA was different. The existing fire insurance companies, being an outgrowth of volunteer firefighting associations, only insured buildings from loss. INA, with its marine insurance origins, introduced the concept of insuring the contents of the buildings as well.

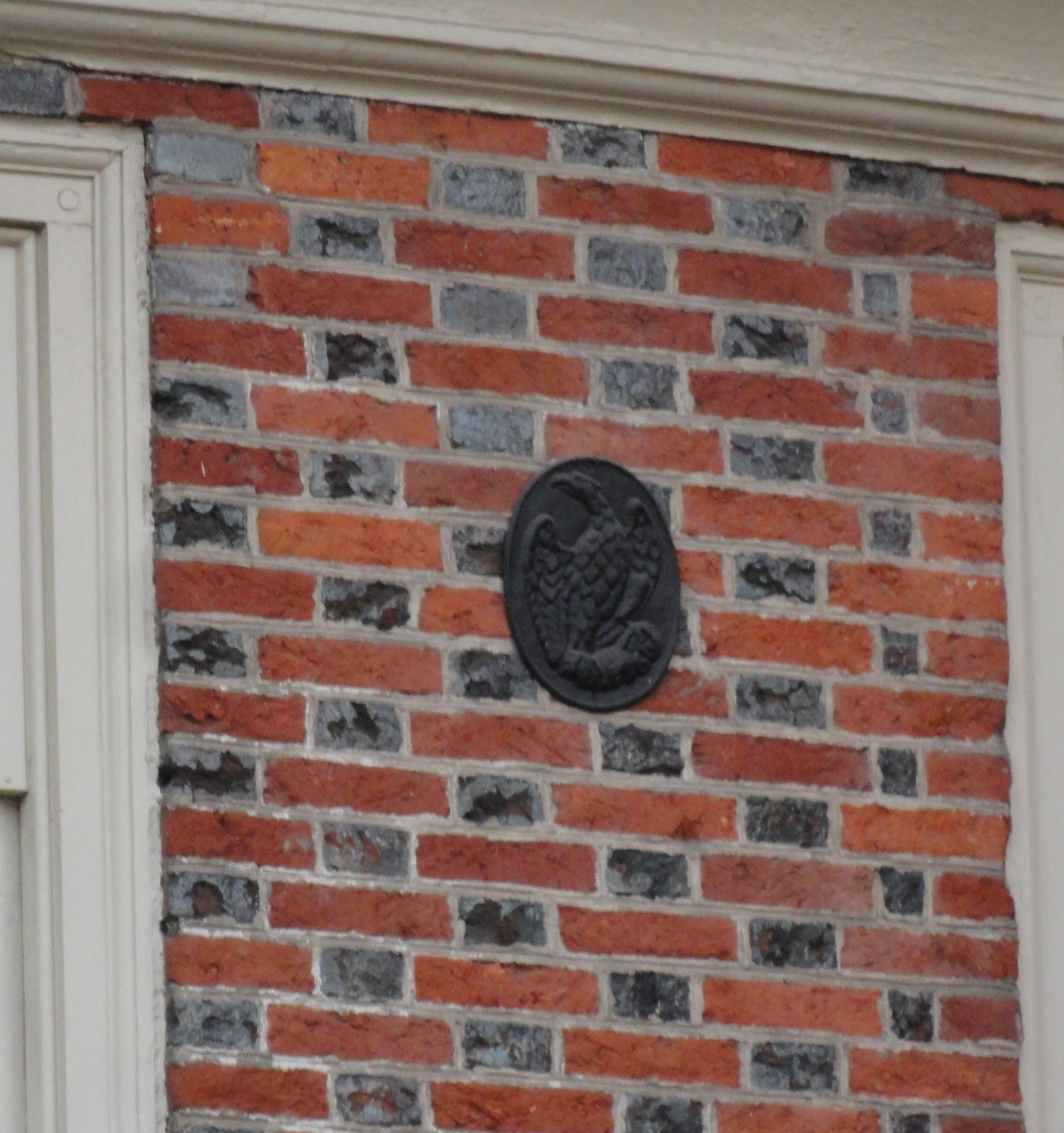
INA firemark circa 1801–1830, as found on a house in the Society Hill neighborhood of Philadelphia, 2013.

INA's first fire insurance policy went to William Beynroth on "German Dry Goods" at his house at 211 High Street (today Market Street) in Philadelphia. INA's first fire mark was a six-pointed star, made with lead and mounted on a wooden shield; in 1796, INA adopted a new mark, of an eagle rising from a rock. Variations of this image would symbolize the company until the 1950s.

By 1807, INA wrote fire insurance from New Hampshire to Georgia. In October, as the wars in Europe made marine insurance increasingly unprofitable, INA director Alexander Henry proposed extending insurance to Lexington, Kentucky on the nation's frontier. The board of directors appointed Henry to head a committee "to consider as to the benefit and propriety of extending insurances against Fire generally to other Cities and Towns in other States beyond what is now customary to take." Henry's committee recommended in favor, and the board authorized INA President John Inskeep to appoint "suitable and trusty persons at such places as he shall think advisable to act as Surveyors and Agents of the Company whose duty it shall be to Survey and Certify the situation of all Buildings and property on which insurance is required, at the expense of the persons applying therefor [sic]." On January 26, 1808, Inskeep appointed agents to Lexington, Frankfort, and Louisville, Kentucky; Washington, Pennsylvania, near the Ohio border; and Cincinnati. This is often credited as the start of the "American agency system", and in 1957 a marker was erected on the campus of Transylvania College in Lexington, Kentucky, commemorating the 150th anniversary of the event.

== 1850–1942 ==
In 1850, INA bought a property at 232 Walnut Street in Philadelphia to begin the tenure of its longest-serving home office site. Though it demolished and rebuilt the office twice (1851; 1880–1881), INA operated from 232 Walnut Street as its headquarters until 1925, and kept the location as its local Philadelphia office until 1942.

Despite the Civil War, INA's agents grew from 40 to 1,300 between 1860 and 1876. INA appointed its first agents outside of the United States in 1873, when it did so in Canada. In 1897, it appointed the Yang-Tsze Insurance Association, Ltd., as its agents in Shanghai, becoming the first U.S. company to write insurance in China.

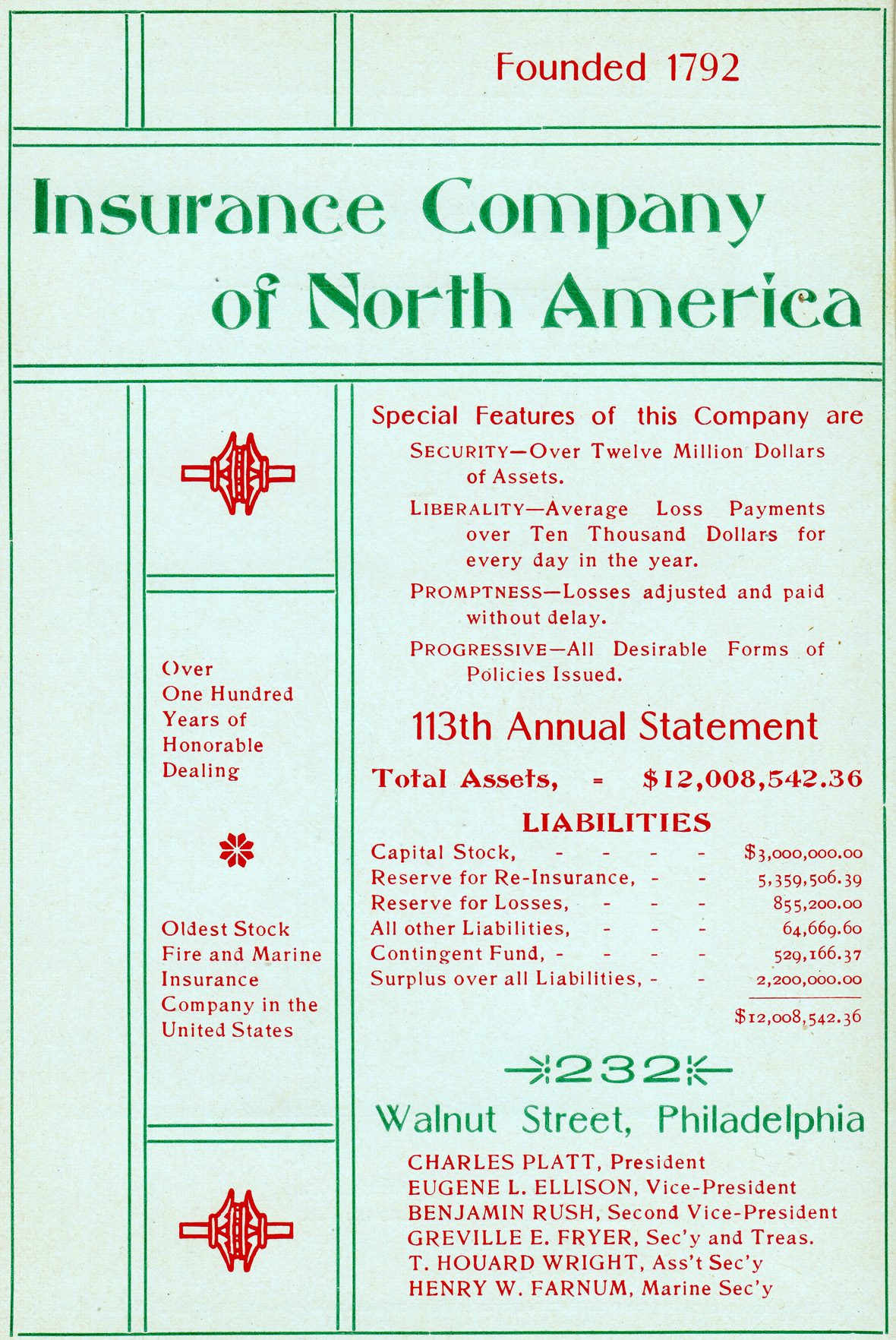
Insurance Co. of North America advertisement, 1905

In both the Chicago fire of 1871 and the San Francisco earthquake and fire of 1906, INA was noted as being among the few insurance companies to pay its losses in full.

By the 1890s, INA began to write modern inland marine insurance. This included automobile insurance in 1905, though the company soon discovered that automobile owners were more concerned about casualty than property protection. As a fire and marine company, INA could not write casualty insurance, so in 1920 it formed its first true subsidiary, the Indemnity Insurance Company of North America, to do so.

As World War I was ending, INA joined other U.S. insurance companies in forming the American Foreign Insurance Association (AFIA) to facilitate the growth of U.S. insurance and reinsurance abroad. INA left the association in 1921, but continued to expand internationally. By the start of World War II the company had service offices in Canada, China, Mexico, and the United Kingdom, and had agents throughout the world.

By the 1920s, INA had outgrown its Philadelphia home office at 232 Walnut Street and constructed a new 16-story office building far to the west of what was then Philadelphia's downtown. The Insurance Company of North America Building, at 1600 Arch Street, opened in 1925 and was designated a National Historic Landmark in 1978.

== 1942–1967 ==
INA came out of the Great Depression as one of the nation's largest insurance companies, with total assets in December 1941 of about $117 million. According to A.M. Best, it had the largest policyholders' surplus (over $75 million) of any U.S. fire insurance company.

In 1942, INA celebrated its 150th anniversary through the book Biography of a Business, a narrative history of the company by Pulitzer Prize-winning historian Marquis James and published by Bobbs-Merrill.

In 1943, the National Association of Insurance Commissioners (NAIC) formed a Multiple Line Underwriting Committee chaired by INA president John A. Diemand. Known as the Diemand Committee, it recommended expanding the underwriting authority of fire, marine, casualty, and surety insurers. The NAIC adopted the committee's recommendations in June 1944 and referred them to the states.

In 1950, INA invented what became the most successful of all multiple-line policies: the homeowners policy. The homeowners policy combined into one policy various kinds of fire, theft, and liability insurance that previously insurance companies had only offered separately. It was soon INA's most popular and most imitated product. In 1951, the U.S. insurance industry wrote $777,000 in premiums on the policy, all by INA; by 1960, it wrote $750 million.

In the 1950s, INA engaged in two notable marketing ventures: In 1955, it began an eight-year sponsorship of CBS Radio's popular Christmas Sing with Bing programs, starring Bing Crosby. And in 1957, it entered into an agreement with Walt Disney in which INA sponsored and staffed an information booth in the Main Street U.S.A. area of Disneyland (called the "Carefree Corner"), and hosted a series of "Family Security and Family Happiness" conferences at the park. The relationship lasted into the early 1970s.

As competition increased from "direct writers" (companies such as Allstate and State Farm that sold insurance directly to the consumer rather than through independent insurance agents), INA looked for ways to diversify as an insurance company. INA formed a life insurance subsidiary, Life Insurance Company of North America, in 1956; in 1965, INA expanded its presence on the U.S. West Coast and also in the workers' compensation field when it acquired the Los Angeles-based Pacific Employers Group (PEG). PEG's flagship, Pacific Employers Insurance Company, was a pioneer in workers' compensation when formed in 1923, and by 1937 was the largest casualty insurance company in California.

== 1967–present ==
As the financial services industry emerged in the 1960s, INA's directors sought to diversify further by entering insurance-related and non-insurance businesses. State regulations made this difficult for an insurance company to do, so in 1967 directors formed a holding company named INA Corporation. On May 29, 1968, INA ended over 175 years as a publicly held company when it became a subsidiary of INA Corporation.

On March 31, 1982, INA Corporation and Connecticut General Corporation (CGC) combined to form CIGNA Corporation. INA became CIGNA's lead property and casualty (P&C) insurer, integrating its business with CGC's smaller P&C firm Aetna Insurance Company. Effective July 2, 1999, ACE Limited acquired CIGNA's international and U.S. property and casualty businesses, including INA. (ACE adopted the name "Chubb" upon its acquisition of Chubb Corp. in 2016.) As of 2016, INA remains one of the global insurance group's active insurance companies, licensed in all 50 states in the United States, as well as the Philippines and Taiwan.

In 2020, New York Life Insurance Company acquired LINA and Cigna Life Insurance Company of New York from Cigna.
