= John Geyer =

Former Mayor of Philadelphia, Pennsylvania

John Geyer (April 18, 1777 – October 25, 1835) was a Mayor of Philadelphia, Pennsylvania, 1813–1814.

A native of Philadelphia, he was a printer by occupation, publishing a German newspaper in that city.

Geyer was elected an alderman of Philadelphia on August 1, 1811. He also served as Register of Wills.

He was elected mayor on October 19, 1813. While serving in this capacity, he was appointed to the Committee of Defence in August 1814.

Political offices
| Preceded by John Barker | Mayor of Philadelphia; 1813–1814 | Succeeded by Robert Wharton |
