= Matthew Lawler =

American politician (1755–1831)

Matthew Lawler (January 1, 1755 – July 14, 1831) was a mayor of Philadelphia, Pennsylvania, serving four one-year terms from 1801 to 1805.

Lawler was active in the American Revolution, in which he commanded privateering ships, including the Holker and later the Ariel.

He served as the chairman of the board of directors of the Philadelphia Bank (later the Philadelphia National Bank, and ultimately CoreStates Financial Corporation) at its organization in 1803.

Lawler died in 1831 in Cincinnati, Ohio, where he was buried at the Episcopal Burial Ground. He and his wife, Ann Bevan Lawler, were reburied in Spring Grove Cemetery, Cincinnati, in 1847.

Political offices
Preceded by John Inskeep	Mayor of Philadelphia; 1801–1805	Succeeded by John Inskeep
