= Samuel Wharton =

18th Century American politician

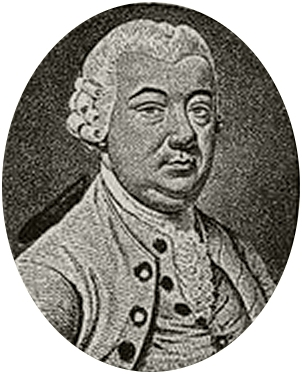
- Samuel Wharton
- Born: May 3, 1732; Philadelphia, Pennsylvania
- Died: March , 1800; Philadelphia, Pennsylvania
- Occupations: Merchant, land speculator, politician
- Known for: Delegate to the Continental Congress
- Spouse: Sarah Lewis
- Father: Joseph Wharton
- Relatives: Thomas Wharton Jr. (first cousin)

Samuel Wharton (May 3, 1732 – March 1800) was a merchant, land speculator, and politician from Dover in Kent County, Delaware. John Baynton, George Morgan, and George Croghan, deputy superintendent of Indian affairs, joined in a partnership on the Ohio Country and Indian Trade after 1763. Though the various colonies laid claim to parts of it after the French and Indian War, the Treaty of Paris gave control of the entire Ohio region to Great Britain of Wharton and their business operation. During the American Revolution, he served as a delegate to the Continental Congress from Delaware.

== Early life and family ==
Born in Philadelphia, Wharton was the son of Joseph Wharton, a successful merchant. He was a first cousin to Thomas Wharton Jr., who was the revolutionary President of Pennsylvania. Though Samuel later made his home in Dover, he always maintained close business connections with the city, where he was a partner in the mercantile firm of Baynton, Wharton and Morgan. He married Sarah Lewis of New Castle in 1754. They would have four children who survived infancy. He was elected to the American Society as a member in 1768.

== Ohio Valley trade ==
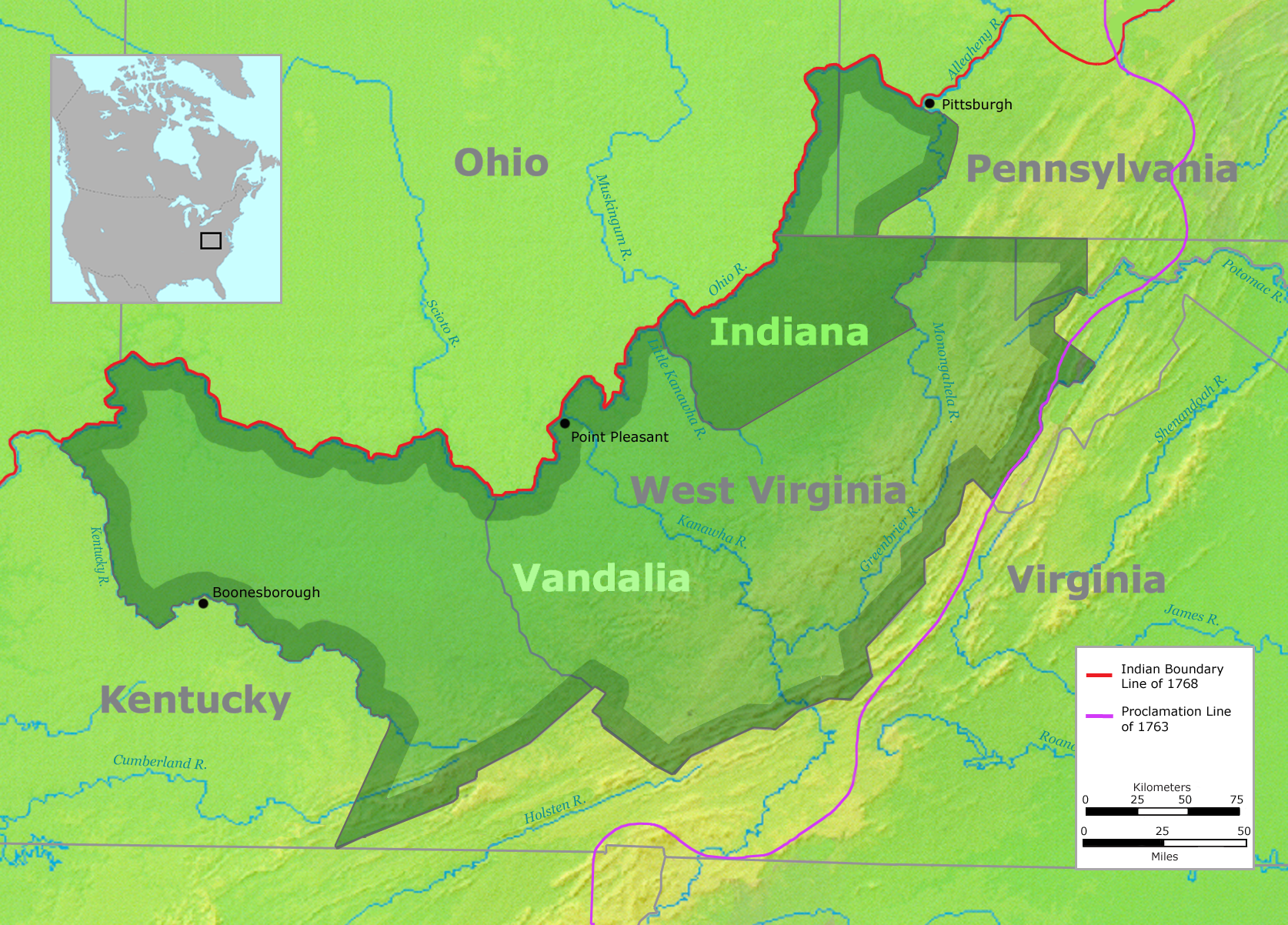
This map shows the Indiana grant awarded to Wharton and his "suffering traders." The land was later included in the Grand Ohio Company's proposed Vandalia colony.

In 1768 Wharton attended the negotiations leading to the Treaty of Fort Stanwix. There Wharton represented a group of merchants, known as the "suffering traders", who had had trade goods destroyed during the French and Indian War and Pontiac's Rebellion (Marshall 1965:717). As compensation for their losses, the Iroquois granted the "suffering traders" a tract of land making up about a fourth of modern West Virginia. This land, known as Indiana—unrelated to the later state of the same name-would cause him nothing but trouble for the next twenty years.

== Political career ==
When the Revolutionary War broke out, Wharton was in London working to secure the crown's approval for the land grant. When some of his letters to rebels were made public, he was forced to flee to France. He was finally able to return to America in 1780, and took an oath of allegiance to the American cause on February 9, 1781.

In 1782 and 1783 Wharton was a delegate to the Continental Congress. Many of his efforts there seem to have been quiet negotiations aimed at gaining recognition for his western land holdings. These did not avail, and he returned to Delaware. The entire claim came to naught when Congress passed the Northwest Ordinance in 1787. Pennsylvania, New York, and Delaware ceded all western claims, and his tract was confirmed as part of Virginia.

Wharton served two years as a state court judge in Delaware before retiring to a country estate just outside Philadelphia, where he died in March 1800.

== Biblio ==
Marshall, Peter, 'Lord Hillsborough, Samuel Wharton and the Ohio Grant, 1769-1775' , The English Historical Review © 1965 Oxford University Press, Stable URL: (article consists of 23 pages).
