= Insurance Company of North America Building (Philadelphia) =

- U.S. National Register of Historic Places
- U.S. National Historic Landmark
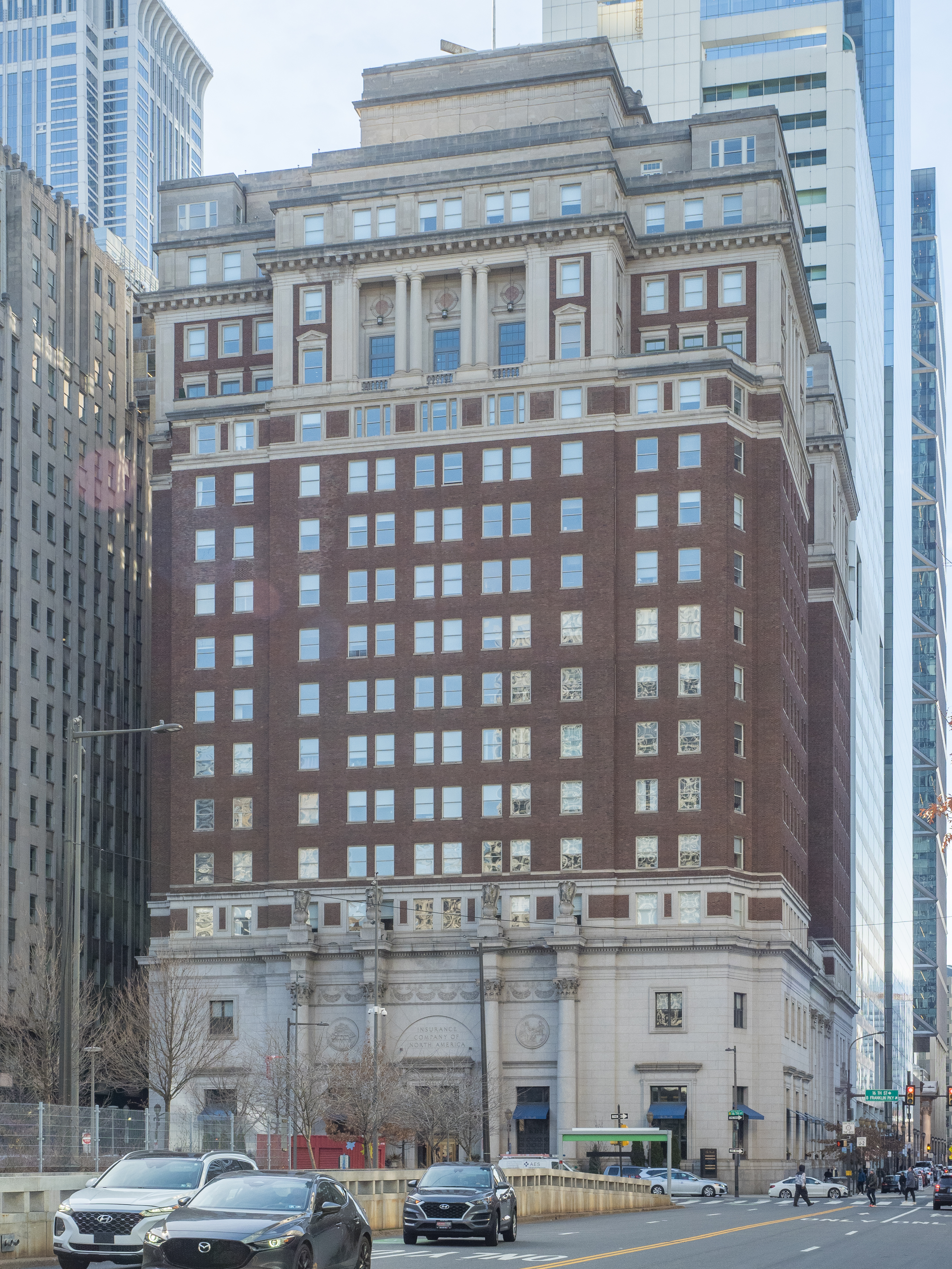
- Insurance Company of North America Building in 2024

- Location within Philadelphia Location within Pennsylvania Location within the United States
- Location: 1600 Arch Street; Philadelphia, Pennsylvania, U.S.
- Coordinates: 39°57′16″N 75°10′2″W
- Built: 1925
- Architects: Stone & Webster, Inc.; Stewardson & Page
- Architectural style: Colonial Revival, Late 19th And 20th Century Revivals
- Website: phoenixphiladelphia.com
- NRHP reference No.: 78002449

Significant dates
- Added to NRHP: June 2, 1978
- Designated NHL: June 2, 1978

The Insurance Company of North America Building, now known as The Phoenix, is a historic commercial building in downtown Philadelphia. Built in 1925, it was for many years the home of the Insurance Company of North America (INA), the nation's first and oldest joint-stock insurance company. It was designated a National Historic Landmark in 1978. The building, occupied by INA until 1991, has been developed into condominiums.

== Description and history ==
The former Insurance Company of North America Building is located on the west side of JFK Plaza, just north of Suburban Station in Philadelphia's central Penn Center area. It is a sixteen-story steel-framed commercial building, finished in brick and stone, occupying an entire city block bounded by Arch, Cuthbert, 16th and 17th Streets. It has a 65-foot (20 m) granite lower level, above which rises a tower of ten uniform stories in brick, topped by a four-story crown. The building was designed by architects Stewardson & Page, formerly Cope & Stewardson, and built by Stone & Webster, Inc.

The building was built to house the headquarters of the Insurance Company of North America (INA), then one of the largest property insurance companies in the United States. The company was founded in 1794, and was the nation's first joint-stock company devoted to selling insurance. The company is credited with numerous innovations in its long history, including an early grading of marine risks in a standardized manner, and the introduction of homeowner's insurance policies that encompassed a variety of different risks. It also played a role in the creation of the agency model of insurance sales. The building was designated a National Historic Landmark in 1978 in recognition of the company's historic significance. It was converted to condominiums in 2002.

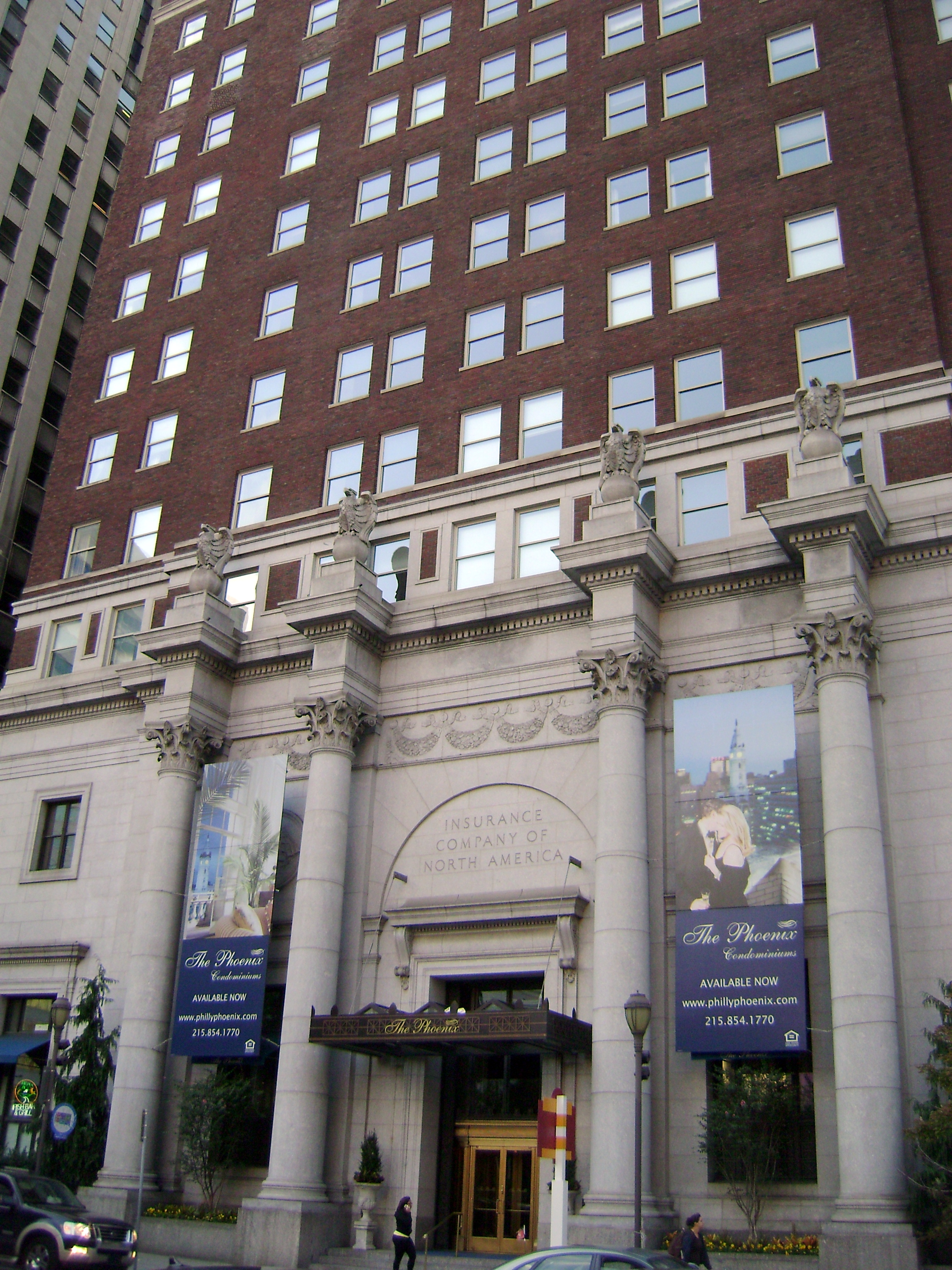
Insurance Company of North America (1925), 16th St. entrance.

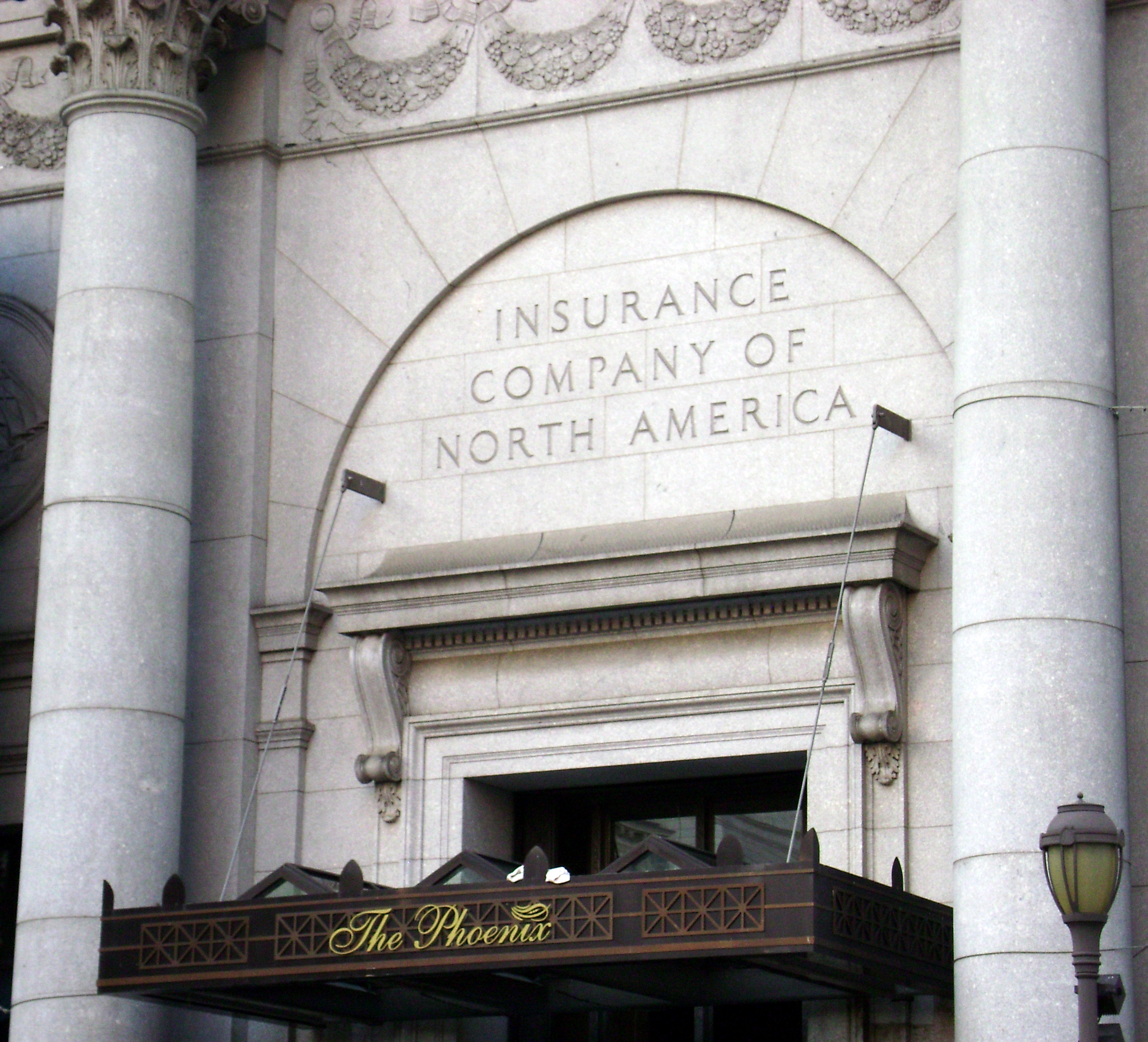

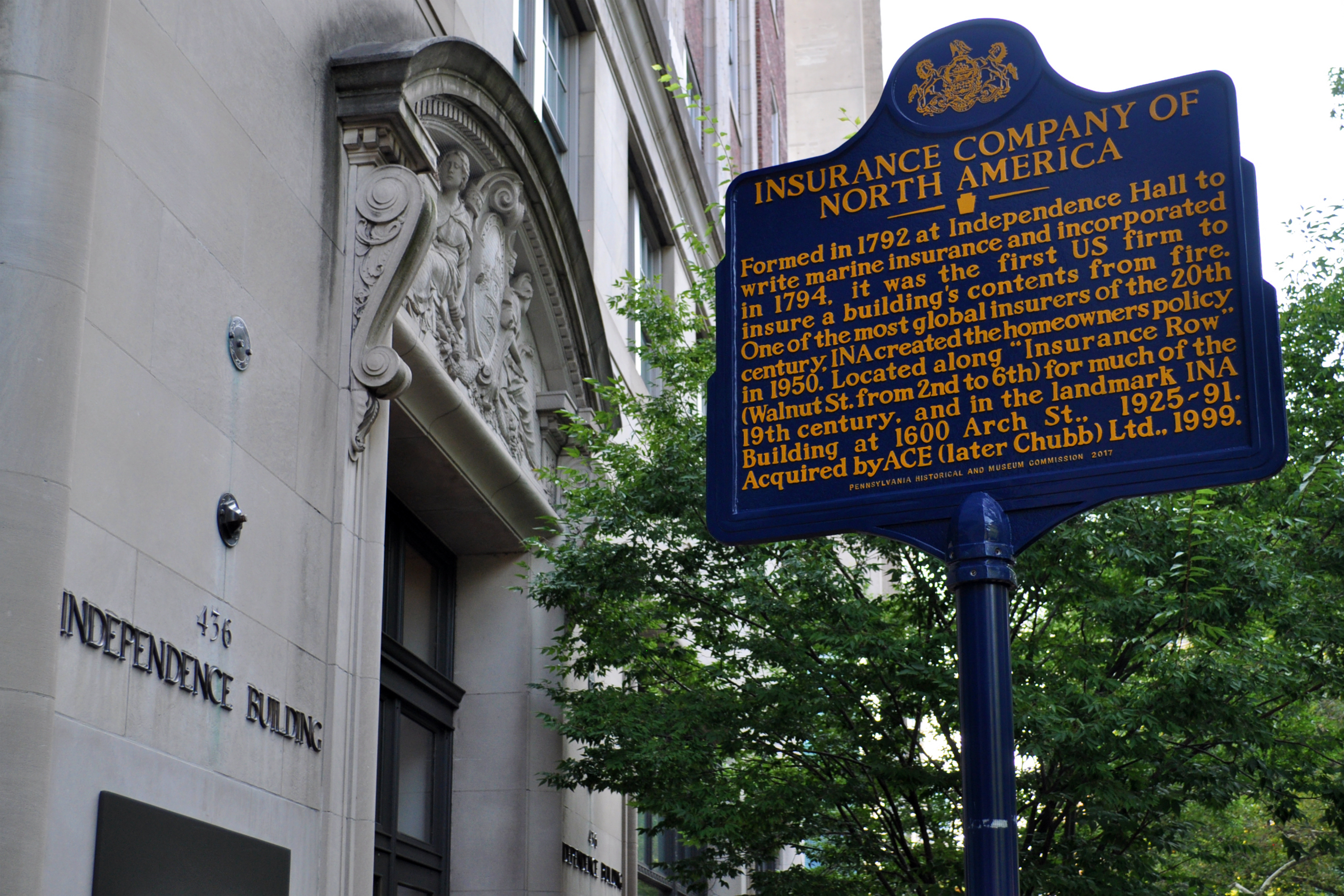
Pennsylvania Historical and Museum Commission Marker

== See also ==
- List of National Historic Landmarks in Philadelphia
- National Register of Historic Places listings in Center City, Philadelphia
