= Plumsted =

Plumsted can refer to:

== People ==
- Clement Plumsted, 18th century mayor of Philadelphia
- William Plumsted, 18th century mayor of Philadelphia, son of Clement Plumsted

== Places ==
- Plumsted Township, New Jersey

See also:

- Plumstead (disambiguation)
