= Alexander McNutt (colonist) =

Canadian politician

Alexander McNutt (1725, near Derry, Ireland – 1811, Lexington, Virginia) was a British Army officer, colonist and land agent, responsible for seeing an approximate 500 Ulster Scottish emigrants arrive in Nova Scotia during the early 1760s.

McNutt emigrated to America some time before 1753 by which time he had settled in the town of Staunton, Virginia. In 1756 he was an officer in the Virginia militia on Major Andrew Lewis's Sandy Creek Expedition against the Shawnees on the Ohio River. By September 1758 McNutt had relocated to Londonderry, New Hampshire, a town settled by Ulster Scots.

Between April and November 1760, McNutt served as a Massachusetts captain at Fort Cumberland near the present-day border between Nova Scotia and New Brunswick, five years after the Expulsion of the Acadians. It was during this time that he became involved in the colonization of Nova Scotia. He concerned himself with the Cobequid Townships of Truro and Londonderry.

Through McNutt's efforts, a group of fifty families from New Hampshire arrived in the spring of 1761 in the Cobequid (Truro) area of Nova Scotia. He had several proposals for settlement of some 7,000 to 8,000 Protestant Irish in Nova Scotia accepted by the Board of Trade in London, but he was not successful in getting the support of the Privy Council who feared such an out-migration would harm British interests in Ireland. He nevertheless went to the Ulster with just the Board of Trade's approval to seek out emigrants. In the spring of 1761 he advertised throughout Ulster with an offer to "industrious farmers and useful mechanics" of 200 acres (0.81 km^{2}) of land to the head of a family and 50 to each member. His effort resulted in 300 colonists arriving in Halifax in October on the ships Hopewell and Nancy.

The next autumn, 170 more settlers arrived out of Londonderry on the same two ships and settled the New Dublin area in present-day Lunenburg County and elsewhere in the province. McNutt also worked to settle a group of disbanded New England soldiers, which included Israel Perley, along the Saint John River. In 1764 he began negotiations with John Hughes of Philadelphia, an undertaking that culminated two years later with 60 Pennsylvania-German settlers establishing The Township of Monckton on the Petitcodiac River.

Plans for huge settlements on some 2,300,000 acres (9,300 km^{2}) of land fell through as the land boom in Nova Scotia petered out by the mid-1760s. McNutt spent time in the later part of the decade living with his brother on McNutt Island in Rosebay Harbour (near present-day Shelburne) as well as in the Cobequid region where he appeared in the 1771 census. He seems to have supported himself at this time cutting timber.

He was elected on October 26, 1767 to the General Assembly of Nova Scotia for Londonderry Township, but his seat was declared vacant on Nov. 8, 1769.

He was ordered to pay several debts and forced to sell his land at Port Roseway. Other land he held on the Minas Basin, on Beaver Harbour, and on the eastern coastal boundary of the Philadelphia grant in Pictou were escheated. He left the colony around 1780, returned around 1786, and left for good in 1794 and finally settled in Rockbridge County, Virginia in 1796.

McNutt rose to the army rank of colonel.
