= Griffith Jones (mayor) =

Mayor of Philadelphia (died 1712)

Griffith Jones (died 1712) was the fourth mayor of Philadelphia, serving from October 3, 1704, to October 2, 1705.

Jones came to Philadelphia in 1682, where he became an early citizen and prominent Quaker merchant. He was among the 12 resident members of the Society of Free Traders, who bought land primarily from William Penn. He owned the Blue Anchor tavern and many other properties in the city. In 1693, he was the second highest taxpayer in the city. He was appointed to the Supreme Court of Pennsylvania in 1690.

Jones served in the Assembly and was named Alderman in the city charter in 1701. He had a country home built around 1687 near Wingohocking Creek east of Germantown. He originally owned 500 acres in Bristol Township. Church Street in Philadelphia east of Second Street was originally named Jones Alley after him.

Jones was first elected Mayor in 1703, but refused to serve citing his country residence outside the city limits. Nevertheless, he was assessed a fine of twenty pounds. Upon being elected again in October 1704, he accepted the office but asked that the fine be forgiven, which request was granted. James Logan, although not a fan of Jones, said Jones was "the best Magistrate Philadelphia ever had in my time, of any kind."

In about 1706, Jones married Elizabeth Robinson, widow of Patrick Robinson (died 1701). After the marriage, he moved into her home on Market Street and bought out stepson Peter Robinson's rights to that house and some other properties. Jones' only son was publicly disowned by the Philadelphia Quaker Meeting, which caused Jones to leave the group

Jones died in 1712 "of a weakness owing chiefly to old age".

Preceded by Anthony Morris (I)	Mayor of Philadelphia; 1704–1705	Succeeded by Joseph Willcox
