= Samuel Preston (mayor) =

American merchant, jurist and mayor (1665–1743)

- Died: September 10, 1743

Samuel Preston (1665 in Patuxent, Calvert County, Maryland – September 10, 1743 in Philadelphia) was a jurist, merchant, and mayor of Philadelphia.

He was brought up as a Quaker. Removing from Maryland to Sussex county (now part of the state of Delaware) on the Delaware, he was sent to the legislature from the latter place in 1693, and again in 1701, and was chosen sheriff in 1695. About 1703 he took up residence in Philadelphia, where he became a merchant, and stood among the most influential of the Quakers of his day. In 1708 he was unanimously elected alderman.

During the same year James Logan, desiring William Penn, founder and proprietor of Pennsylvania, to consider whom to add to the property commission, wrote to him, saying: "Samuel Preston is also a very good man, and now makes a figure, and, indeed, Rachel's husband ought particularly to be taken notice of, for it has too long been neglected, even for thy own interest." Preston's wife, Rachel Lloyd (b. January 20, 1667; m. July 16, 1688; d. August 15, 1716) was the daughter of Thomas Lloyd, president of Penn's council. Almost immediately afterward, Preston was called to the council, on which he served until he died. He was chosen mayor of Philadelphia in 1711, and in 1714 became the treasurer of the province, retaining the office until his death. In 1726 he became a justice of the peace and of the court of common pleas, and in 1728 one of the commissioners of property, which office he held many years. He was also one of the trustees under Penn's will.

Preceded by William Carter	Mayor of Philadelphia; 1711–1712	Succeeded by Jonathan Dickinson
