= Joseph Willcox =

Politician in colonial America

Joseph Willcox was the fifth mayor of Philadelphia, serving from October 2, 1705, to October 1, 1706.

Willcox was named an Alderman in the City Charter in 1701. He was a member of the Assembly. He drew up the remonstrance of 1704 addressed to William Penn which caused offense. A 1698 source refers to him as the principal ropemaker in the city. He served as mayor from October 2, 1705, to October 1, 1706.

Willcox married Ann Powell, who was also the step-daughter of prior mayor Griffith Jones.

| Preceded by Griffith Jones | Mayor of Philadelphia; 1705–1706 | Succeeded by Nathan Stanbury |
