= Thomas Masters (mayor) =

- Position held: Mayor of Philadelphia

Thomas Masters (d. 1723) was the mayor of colonial Philadelphia from 7 October 1707 to October 4, 1709, before Richard Hill, and after Nathan Stanbury.

== Life ==
Belonging to the Masters Quaker merchant family, going back to William Penn's time, Thomas Masters arrived in Pennsylvania around 1700, or slightly earlier. He came with his family from Bermuda, having married sometime between 1693 and 1696. He was married to Sybilla Masters, a noted inventor and possibly the first woman inventor in colonial America. Letters patent were granted under the Privy Seal to Thomas Masters for her wife's invention (women could not have their own patents at the time) in 1715, specifically a device for "cleaning and curing Indian corn growing in the several colonies in America". They had four children, and three or four died in infancy.

Masters served on the Supreme Court of Pennsylvania from 1701 to 1703. He became a city Assembly member in 1704 and 1712, and from the county in 1710 and 1716. He was Alderman of the city in 1702, provincial councilor (1707-8 and 1720-23), as well as Mayor.

Masters St in Philadelphia was named after him.
