= Matthew Clarkson (mayor) =

American politician

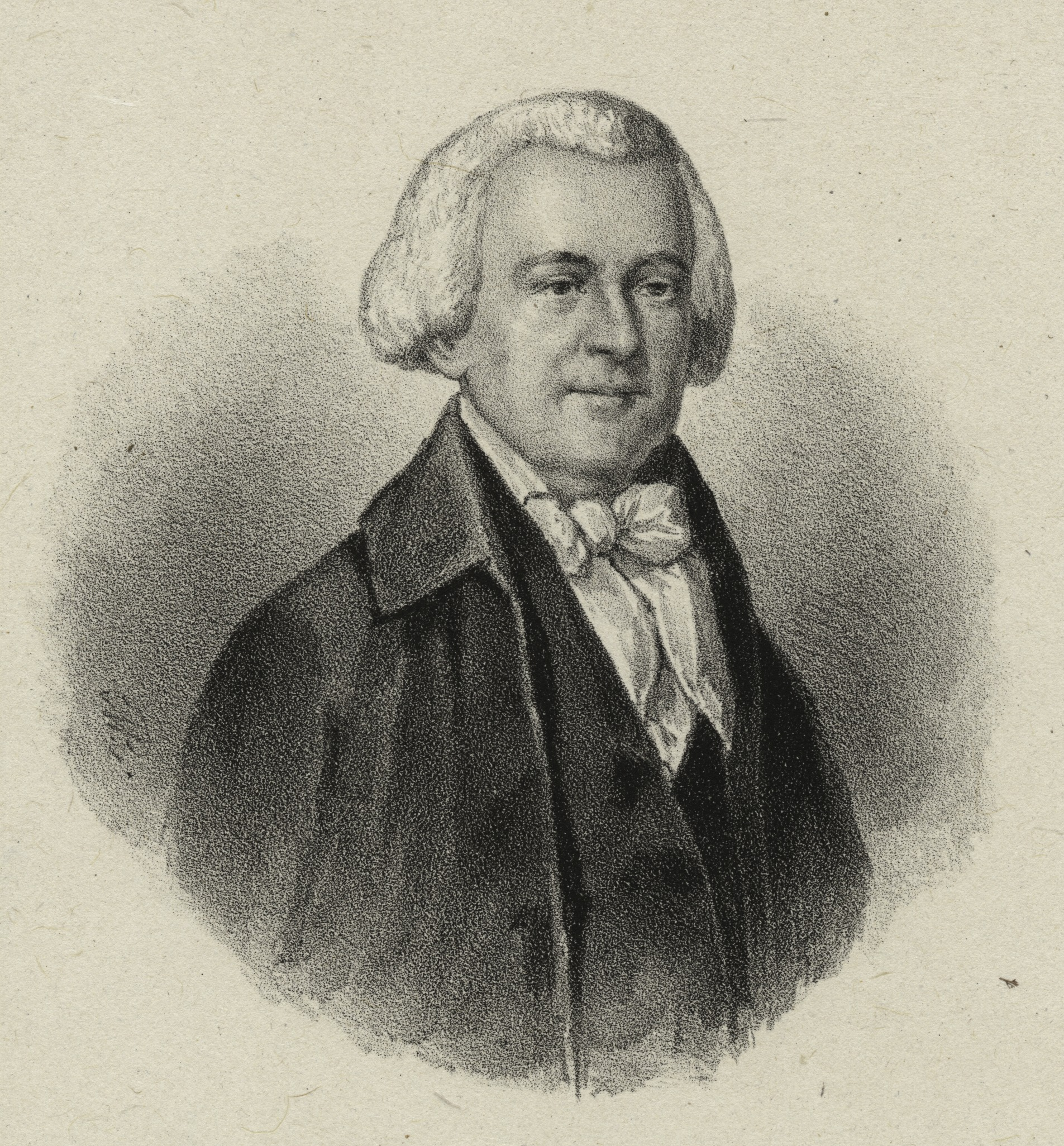

48th Mayor of Philadelphia
- In office April 13, 1792 – October 18, 1796
- Preceded by: John Barclay
- Succeeded by: Hilary Baker

Personal details
- Born: April 1733 New York City, Province of New York, British America
- Died: October 5, 1800 (aged 67) Philadelphia, Pennsylvania
- Resting place: Christ Church Burial Ground

Matthew Clarkson (April 1733 – October 5, 1800) was an American politician who served as the mayor of Philadelphia from 1792 to 1796. He was elected to the Confederation Congress in 1785, but did not attend.

== Biography ==
Clarkson was born in New York City in April 1733. He moved to Philadelphia, where he was a justice of the court of common pleas, quarter sessions of the peace, and of the Philadelphia Orphans' court in 1771 and 1772. From 1779-1781 he served as treasurer of the American Philosophical Society, which he was elected to in 1768. He was elected to the Confederation Congress in 1785, but did not serve. He was a member of the board of aldermen in 1789, then served as mayor of Philadelphia 1792–1796.

Clarkson was involved in numerous businesses, notably a dry-goods store on Second Street. He was also part owner of two schooners registered in 1757 and 1758. In 1765 he became involved inland settlement in the British colony of Nova Scotia, where a 100,000-acre township called Monckton was granted by the government in Halifax to Clarkson and several land partners including Anthony Wayne, John Hughes and Benjamin Franklin.

He died in 1800 in Philadelphia, where he was interred in Christ Church Burial Ground.

== See also ==
- Philadelphia history and timeline

Political offices
Preceded by John Barclay	Mayor of Philadelphia; 1792–1796	Succeeded by Hilary Baker
