= Township of Monckton =

Former township

The Township of Monckton was a 100,000-acre (40,468.6-hectare) tract of land situated on the Petitcodiac River in colonial Nova Scotia (in today’s Canadian province of New Brunswick). It was granted by the British government at Halifax in 1765 to a syndicate of four Philadelphia land companies headed, respectively, by John Hughes, William Smith, Matthew Clarkson and Isaac Caton. The companies also included Anthony Wayne, who was chosen to survey the township, plus Israel Jacobs, Benjamin Franklin and fifteen other Pennsylvania merchants and gentlemen. The township was named after Robert Monckton, who captured Fort Beauséjour from the French in 1755.

The founding of Monckton was a direct result of Col. Alexander McNutt’s efforts to resettle Nova Scotia with immigrants from Ireland. McNutt, whom American historian J.B. Brebner has characterized as “highly persuasive, distinctly untrustworthy,” succeeded in a few instances but failed to accomplish most of his grandiose schemes.

Monckton’s proprietors, as they were properly termed, were contractually obligated to import settlers from the American colonies to their township. Eleven families, totaling 60 men, women and children, were dispatched from Philadelphia on the last weekend of April 1766 and landed at Monckton township on June 3. The families, mostly of German extraction, included the names Stief, Lutz, Treitz, Sommer, Jones, Richter, Wortman, Koppel, Ackley, Reynolds and Smith. Under the terms of agreement with the proprietors the settlers were obligated to build houses, to clear and fence fields, and to plant crops.

Due to managerial and logistical problems that arose among the Philadelphia land companies, the proprietors failed to support their settlers and the township as an entity eventually disintegrated. In 1775 the settlers sued the proprietors for non fulfillment of obligations, and legally gained possession of the lands they had occupied since 1766.

In 1855 the township of Monckton was incorporated as a town, but lost its status in 1862 when the local shipbuilding industry collapsed. During its re-incorporation in 1875, a provincial clerk misspelled the name by omitting the letter ‘k,’ making Moncton the official spelling. The town was incorporated in 1890 as the city of Moncton, New Brunswick.

== Bibliography ==
- “A General Return of the several Townships in the Province of Nova Scotia, the first day of January, 1767,” Collections of the Nova Scotia Historical Society, Vol. VII (Halifax, 1889-1891)
- Akagi, Roy H. The Town Proprietors of the New England Colonies, University of Pennsylvania, 1924 & 1963
- Bowser, Les "John Hall and the Eleven Families at Monckton,” Generations, the magazine of the New Brunswick Genealogical Society, Summer, 2006; citing Anthony Wayne to Samuel Weathered, Mar 3, 1768, "Anthony Wayne Papers," Library and Archives Canada
- Bowser, Les The Search for Heinrich Stief: a genealogist on the loose, Nimbus Publishing, 2001
- Brebner, John Bartlett The Neutral Yankees of Nova Scotia, McClelland & Stewart, 1969
- Hempel, Rainer L. New Voices on the Shores: Early Pennsylvania German Settlements in New Brunswick, German-Canadian Historical Society, 2000; citing John Hall to William Smith, June 13, 1766, "William Smith Papers," Historical Society of Pennsylvania
- Labaree, Leonard W, ed. The Papers of Benjamin Franklin, Vol. 12, American Philosophical Society, 1968
- Pincombe, C.A. & Larracey, E.W. Resurgo: The History of Moncton, Vol.1, City of Moncton, 1990
- Raymond, W.O. “Colonel Alexander McNutt and the Pre-Loyalist Settlements of Nova Scotia,” Proceedings & Transactions of the Royal Society of Canada, 3rd Series, Vol. V, 1911
