= Township (Nova Scotia) =

Former division of Nova Scotia

Counties of Nova Scotia (1862) with township subdivisions

A township in Nova Scotia, Canada, was an early form of land division and local administration during British colonial settlement in the 18th century. They were created as a means of populating the colony with people loyal to British rule. They were typically rural or wilderness areas of around 100,000 acres (400 km^{2}) that would eventually include several villages or towns. Some townships, but not all, returned a member to the General Assembly of Nova Scotia; others were represented by the members from the county. Townships became obsolete by 1879 by which time towns and counties had become incorporated.

== Historical background ==
Originally inhabited by Mi'kmaq peoples, the first European colonists to settle in present-day Nova Scotia were the French who arrived in 1605 and founded Acadia. The British conquest of Acadia took place in 1710 and was formalised by the 1713 Treaty of Utrecht which returned Cape Breton Island to the French. This marked the beginning of permanent British control over the peninsular portion of Acadia, which they renamed Nova Scotia. However, conflict continued between British, French, Acadian and Mi'kmaq interests, notably Father Le Loutre's War of 1749–1755 and the French and Indian War of 1754–1763, against the backdrop of the global struggle of the Seven Years' War between 1756 and 1763. Eighty-five years of conflict between the British and the Mi'kmaq were ended with the signing of the Halifax Treaties in 1760 and 1761, and the Burying the Hatchet ceremony in 1761.

In 1749 the capital of Nova Scotia moved from Annapolis Royal to the newly established Halifax. The Nova Scotia Council was the administrative and judicial body in Nova Scotia from 1720 to 1758; it was also known as the Council of Nova Scotia, the Annapolis Council (prior to 1749) and the Halifax Council (after 1749). Following the expulsion of the Acadians between 1755 and 1764, the British population of the colony was only 5,000. The first elected General Assembly of Nova Scotia sat in 1758.

In 1763, Cape Breton Island, Sunbury County (now New Brunswick) and St. John's Island (now Prince Edward Island) reverted to British ownership and became part of the colony of Nova Scotia following the Treaty of Paris. In 1769 St. John's Island became a separate colony, and Sunbury County followed in 1784.

== History of townships in Nova Scotia ==
The first township created by the British was Lunenburg in 1753. The British government paid for Dutch and German families to settle the area and provided them with assistance. Some 1400 settlers arrived in June 1753 from Halifax on 14 vessels, along with boards, bricks and nails supplied by the government. They were accompanied by 150 troops as intelligence had suggested that Mi'kmaq forces were ready to oppose settlement. Land adjacent to the town was divided among the settlers. A picket fence was erected around the town, blockhouses built and a militia was formed. Three Justices of the Peace had been appointed before departing from Halifax. In 1754 livestock were sent by the government, and in 1761 a grant of 2000 acres of common grazing land was made. The township was raided in 1756 by Indian forces, and was sacked in 1782 by American privateers during the American Revolution.

The Nova Scotia Council in Halifax were under the supervision of the Board of Trade in London. It was their policy that office holders had to be British subjects and the Test Act insisted on them being Anglican. This rule was circumvented by recognizing 'local delegates' who acted as administrators and magistrates. They also accepted Lutherans and German Reformed Protestants as nominally Anglican. Council based local government loosely on the Virginian county model, rather than the New England town model.

Charles Lawrence, Governor of Nova Scotia, issued a proclamation on 12 October 1758 encouraging new settlers from the Thirteen Colonies. He offered large plots of land, an elected Assembly, and the New England model of 'township' for local government and land ownership. Thirteen townships of 100,000 acres each were planned, but the response, which saw the first New England Planters arriving early in 1759, was so large that twenty townships were established by 1775. The Planters brought with them the New England style of township government, choosing their own officers and running their own affairs. A legacy of the Planters is their record-keeping in the 'township books', 35 of which are preserved at the Nova Scotia Archives. They contain minutes of town meetings, vital statistics, town proprietors, property lots, cattle marks, and other land-related records.

Charles Morris, Surveyor General 1748–1781, was responsible for laying out township boundaries and choosing sites for villages. Each township had its own surveyor to layout plots within that boundary. The assignment of plots to individuals was done by drawing lots.

Not all grantees fulfilled the requirements of populating their lands and they lost their proprietorship. Examples include the two 'Philadelphia grants' listed below.

In 1827 the British government declared that grants of crown land would cease and all future dispositions would be by sale.

The demise of the township form of local government began in the 1850s with Acts that enabled the voluntary creation of both municipal counties and incorporated townships. Yarmouth township took advantage of this, but abandoned it in 1858. However, Dartmouth incorporated in 1873, and by 1888 there were eight incorporated towns. In 1879 the County Incorporation Act saw the end of the Quarter Sessions form of government.

== List of townships in Nova Scotia, 1831 ==
- Ainslie Township. One of four townships created by the division of the north-western District of Cape Breton Island, 7 April 1828.
- Amherst Township, Cumberland County. Settled in 1763. Returned one member to the provincial parliament. Population (1827), 1318. 45.91°N 64.11°W (Note: One of the thirteen townships originally planned by Lawrence, namely: Amherst, Annapolis, Barrington, Cornwallis, Cumberland, Falmouth, Granville, Horton, Liverpool, Onslow, Sackville, Tinmouth, Yarmouth.)
- Annapolis Township, Annapolis County. Granted in 1764 and returned one member to the provincial parliament. In 1827 the population was 2,578, and 4,758 acres were cultivated. 44.83°N 65.29°W
- Argyle Township, Shelburn County 43.72°N 65.76°W 120,000 acres laid out in 1771. In 1827 the population was 2790, and 2640 acres were cultivated.
- Arisaig Township, Upper Sydney District, Sydney County. Laid out in 1826, when the Upper District of Sydney is divided into four townships. 45.77°N 62.07°W
- Aylesford Township, King's County. Settled in 1784 by Loyalists. In 1827 the population was 1098, and 3,429 acres were cultivated. 45.07°N 64.85°W
- Barrington Township, Shelburne County 43.60°N 65.55°W 100,000 acres, granted in 1760 to 200 New England families. Returned one member to the provincial parliament. In 1827 the population was 2186, and 1687 acres were cultivated.
- Canso Township. One of four townships created by the division of the north-western District of Cape Breton Island, 7 April 1828.
- Chester Township, Lunenburg County. Granted to 73 applicants in 1759 to 'erect' a township known as Shoreham. Laid out in 1760. Settled by New Englanders and Germans. In 1827 the population was 2092, and 3,346 acres were cultivated. 44.62°N 64.32°W
- Clare Township, Annapolis County. Repopulated by Acadians in 1763 following the Treaty of Paris. Laid out in 1768. In 1827 the population was 2,038, and 2,885 acres were cultivated. 44.23°N 66.06°W
- Clements Township, Annapolis County. Settled in 1784 by Hessian and American loyalists. In 1827 the population was 1,611, and 2,649 acres were cultivated. 44.62°N 65.60°W
- Cornwallis Township, King's County. Settled in 1760 by emigrants from Connecticut. In 1827 the population was 4404, and 13,100 acres were cultivated. 45.19°N 64.52°W
- Cumberland Township, settled in 1762–63 by settlers from Rhode Island. It originally had an area of 100,800 acres and encompassed all the land between the La Planche and Aulac Rivers, and east to Bay Verte and southwest to the Cumberland Basin and included Fort Beausejour. It was divided into two parts in 1784 with the creation of New Brunswick.
- Dartmouth Township, Halifax District, Halifax County. In 1827 the population was 1,070, and 652 acres were cultivated. 44.75°N 63.65°W
- Digby Township, Annapolis County. Granted in 1784 to American Loyalists and returned one member to the provincial parliament. In 1827 the population was 3,614, and 2,492 acres were cultivated. 44.56°N 65.78°W
- Dorchester Township, later known as Antigonish Township, Upper Sydney District, Sydney County. Laid out in 1826, when the Upper District of Sydney is divided into four townships. Population(1827), 2432. 45.57°N 62.06°W
- Douglas Township, Hants County. 105,000 acres. Settled in 1784 by members of the 2nd Battalion, 84th Regiment under the proprietorship of Colonel Small. Population(1827), 2273. 45.06°N 63.55°W
- Economy Township, Colchester District, Halifax County45.42°N 63.93°W (Note: This is one of several townships shown on Wyld's 1825 map, but not listed in Bouchette (1831))
- Egerton Township, District of Pictou, Halifax County. Created in 1807 when the District of Pictou was divided into three townships. In 1827 the population was 5,622, and 24,270 acres were cultivated. 45.59°N 62.65°W
- Falmouth Township, Hants County. 50,000 acres granted in 1759. Returned one member to the provincial parliament. Population(1827), 869. 44.98°N 64.21°W
- Granville Township, Annapolis County. Granted in 1764 to 158 proprietors. Returned one member to the provincial parliament. In 1827 the population was 2,526, and 4,200 acres were cultivated. 44.79°N 65.53°W
- Greenfield Township, Colchester District, Halifax County45.35°N 63.17°W
- Guysborough Township, Lower Sydney District, Sydney County. 100,000 acres granted in 1784 to American loyalists. (Note: The combined population in 1928 of Guysborough, Manchester and St.Mary's was 5657.(Bouchette (1831), p. 23.)) 45.33°N 61.66°W
- Halifax Township, Halifax District, Halifax County. In 1827 the population was 5686, and 9678 acres were cultivated.44.60°N 63.80°W
- Horton Township, King's County. 100,000 acres, settled in 1760 by New Englanders who restored 4,000 acres of Acadian dike land. Founded in 1763. In 1827 the population was 3014, and 11,286 acres were cultivated.45.11°N 64.46°W
- Kempt Township, Hants County. Laid out in 1824. 80,000 acres. Population(1827), 595.45.17°N 64.02°W
- Lawrencetown Township, Halifax District, Halifax County. Laid out in 1754; 20,000acres. In 1827 the population was 1391, and 1598 acres were cultivated. 44.68°N 63.37°W
- Liverpool Township, Queen's County. Returned one member to the provincial parliament. By 1827 the population was 4,342 and 3,006 acres were cultivated. 44.11°N 64.76°W
- Londonderry Township, Colchester District, Halifax County Settled in 1763 by Colonel McNutt and returned one member to the provincial parliament. In 1827 the population was 1,398, and 4,924 acres were cultivated. 45.46°N 63.66°W
- Lunenburg Township, Lunenburg County. Settled in 1753 by Dutch and Germans. It was the first area outside Halifax to be granted local government, and set a precedent contrary to official policy for encouraging ethnic diversity within government. Returned one member to the provincial parliament. In 1827 the population was 5038, and 7,081 acres were cultivated. 44.41°N 64.43°W
- Maitland Township, Hants County. 45.26°N 63.61°W
- Manchester Township, Lower Sydney District, Sydney County Settled in 1784 by Carolinians of the Duke of Cumberland's Regiment and named by their commander Lord Charles Montagu for his father, 3rd Duke of Manchester. More settlers arrived from New England in 1786, and were soon obliged to share their provisions with their destitute neighbours. 45.52°N 61.41°W
- Margaree Township. One of four townships created by the division of the north-western District of Cape Breton Island, 7 April 1828.
- Maxwelton Township, District of Pictou, Halifax County. Created in 1807 when the District of Pictou was divided into three townships. In 1827 the population was 2,111, and 6,149 acres were cultivated. 45.51°N 62.37°W
- New Caledonia Township, Districts of Pictou & Halifax, Halifax County 45.74°N 62.86°W
- New Dublin Township, Lunenburg County. Granted to New Englanders who abandoned it, then settled by Germans and others. In 1827 the population was 2275, and 3,040 acres were cultivated. 44.26°N 64.57°W Originally known as Tinmouth Township.
- Newport Township, Hants County. 58,000 acres granted in 1761. Returned one member to the provincial parliament. Population(1827), 1960.45.05°N 64.03°W
- Onslow Township, Colchester District, Halifax County. Settled in 1761 by Irish emigrants under Colonel McNutt. Returned one member to the provincial parliament. In 1827 the population was 1,239, and 5,729 acres were cultivated. 45.41°N 63.28°W
- Parsborough Township, Colchester / Cumberland / King's County. (Note: Parsborough Township was in King's County until 1840 when it was annexed and part was in Cumberland County and part in Colchester County.) In 1827 the population was 1692, and 6335 acres were cultivated. 45.47°N 64.26°W
- Philadelphia grant, District of Pictou, Halifax County 45.74°N 62.86°W 200,000 acres (81,000 ha) granted in October 1765 to a group of Philadelphia businessmen who failed to populate the grant with at least one-thousand Protestant settlers by 1775.
- Philadelphia Township Grant, Parrsboro, was a failed attempt to create a 20,000 acre (8,100 ha) township.
- Pictou Township, District of Pictou, Halifax County. Created in 1807 when the District of Pictou was divided into three townships. In 1827 the population was 4,777, and 17,996 acres were cultivated.45.67°N 62.89°W
- Port Hood Township. One of four townships created by the division of the north-western District of Cape Breton Island, 7 April 1828.
- Preston Township, Halifax District, Halifax County. Laid out in 1784; granted to 388 settlers. In 1827 the population was 1,043, and 906 acres were cultivated. 44.73°N 63.46°W
- Pubnico Township, Shelburn County 43.71°N 65.78°W (Note: This is one of several townships listed in Bouchette (1831), but not shown on Wyld's 1825 map. Coordinates based on settlement or river of same name.)
- Rawdon Township, Hants County. 24,000 acres, laid out in 1784 and settled by Planters. Population(1827), 85. 45.07°N 63.78°W
- Sackville Township Settled in 1763. In 1784 it became part of New Brunswick.
- Shelburne, Township, Shelburn County. 43.85°N 65.30°W 100,000 acres, originally granted to Colonel McNutt 1764, but he failed to meet the terms. Settled in 1783 by 500 American Loyalist families. Returned one member to the provincial parliament. In 1827 the population was 2697, and 3133 acres were cultivated.
- Sherbrooke Township, King's County 44.79°N 64.68°W
- St.Andrew's Township, Upper Sydney District, Sydney County. Laid out in 1826, when the Upper District of Sydney is divided into four townships. 45.59°N 61.85°W
- St.Mary's Township, Lower Sydney District, Sydney County. First settled in 1784 to American refugees, formed into a township of 280,000 acres in 1818. 45.08°N 61.95°W
- Stormont Township, Sydney County. 45.19°N 61.79°W
- Tracadie Township, Upper Sydney District, Sydney County. Laid out in 1826, when the Upper District of Sydney is divided into four townships. 45.62°N 61.64°W
- Truro Township, Colchester District, Halifax County. 50,000acres; granted to Irish settlers in 1765. Returned one member to the provincial parliament. Population(1827), 1380.45.33°N 63.36°W Originally proposed as Wolfe Township.
- Wallace Township, Cumberland County. Population (1827), 1917. 45.80°N 63.48°W
- Wilmot Township, Annapolis County. Granted in 1764. In 1827 the population was 2,294, and 5,190 acres were cultivated. 44.99°N 65.09°W
- Wilmot Township, Lower Sydney District, Sydney County. Laid out in 1764 and named in honour of Montague Wilmot. 45.24°N 61.41°W
- Windsor Township, Hants County. Granted 1764. Returned one member to the provincial parliament. Population(1827), 2065. 44.83°N 64.10°W
- Yarmouth Township, Shelburn 43.86°N 66.06°W 100,000 acres, granted 153 shares to New Englanders in 1767. In 1827 the population was 4345, and 10,039 acres were cultivated. Returned one member to the provincial parliament.

== See also ==
- List of counties of Nova Scotia
- Military history of the Mi'kmaq people
- Military history of Nova Scotia
- Military history of the Acadians
