= William Carter (mayor of Philadelphia) =

Ninth mayor of Philadelphia

William Carter (June 1651-February 1739) was the ninth mayor of Philadelphia, serving from October 1710 to October 1711.

In 1651, Carter was born in Stepney parish in Middlesex, England. He came to Philadelphia in 1682. He was a turner/blockmaker, and acquired many lots in the city. He was a Quaker at least by 1686 when he was a member of the Philadelphia Monthly Meeting.

Among other public offices he held, Carter was made sheriff in 1686 for one year. He was elected to the Assembly in 1705, and was elected Mayor for a one year term in October 1710.

Carter was buried on February 21, 1739.

Preceded by Richard Hill	Mayor of Philadelphia; 1710–1711	Succeeded by Samuel Preston
