= Humphrey Morrey =

First mayor of Philadelphia from 1691 to 1701

1st Mayor of Philadelphia
- In office 1691–1701
- Preceded by: Office established
- Succeeded by: Edward Shippen

Personal details
- Born: c.1650 England
- Died: 1716 (aged 65–66) Philadelphia, Province of Pennsylvania, British America

Humphrey Morrey, or Murrey (c. 1650–1716) was the first mayor of Philadelphia under William Penn's 1691 charter. He was not elected, but rather was appointed by Penn.

== Career ==
In 1683, Morrey came to Philadelphia in the colonial-era Province of Pennsylvania, where he worked as a merchant. Three years after arriving in Philadelphia, in 1685, he was appointed justice of the peace. In 1687 and again in 1690, he was chosen to the provincial assembly.

=== First mayor of Philadelphia ===
In the charter of March 20, 1691, under which the City of Philadelphia was incorporated, Morrey was appointed by William Penn, the founder of the Province of Pennsylvania, as the city's first mayor. Morrey served for ten years in the position, which was then an uncompensated and volunteer position. In 1701, Morrey was succeeded by Edward Shippen, the city's second mayor, who was appointed by William Penn to a one-year term, and was then re-elected to a second term by the Philadelphia City Council.

Morrey was one of the fifteen founders of present-day Cheltenham Township, Pennsylvania.

== See also ==
- Philadelphia history and timeline

Preceded by none	Mayor of Philadelphia; 1691–1701	Succeeded by Edward Shippen
