= Douglas, Nova Scotia =

Former township in Nova Scotia, Canada

Coordinates: 45.3°N 63.6°W

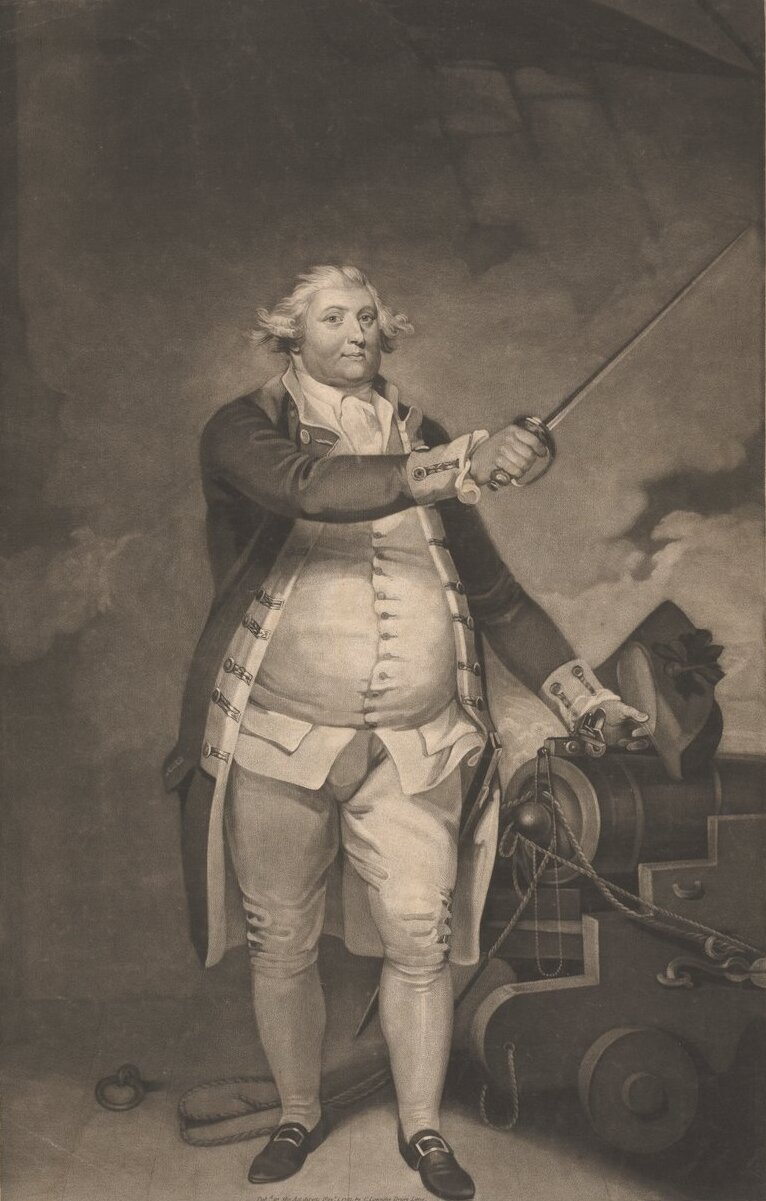
Sir Charles Douglas, 1st Baronet, (c.1791)

Douglas (Scottish-Gaelic: Baile Dhùghlais) is a former township in the Canadian province of Nova Scotia, named after Sir Charles Douglas, 1st Baronet. The township was founded in 1784 by the troops of the 84th Regiment of Foot (Royal Highland Emigrants) after the American Revolutionary War, under the proprietorship of Colonel John Small. The township was the eventual destination of Loyalists fleeing the Siege of Ninety Six. In 1861, along with the township of Rawdon and other neighbouring townships, the Douglas township became part of the newly formed Municipal District of East Hants.

The township is the site of the present-day communities of Kennetcook, Gore, Noel and Maitland.
