= John Barclay (mayor) =

American politician (1749–1824)

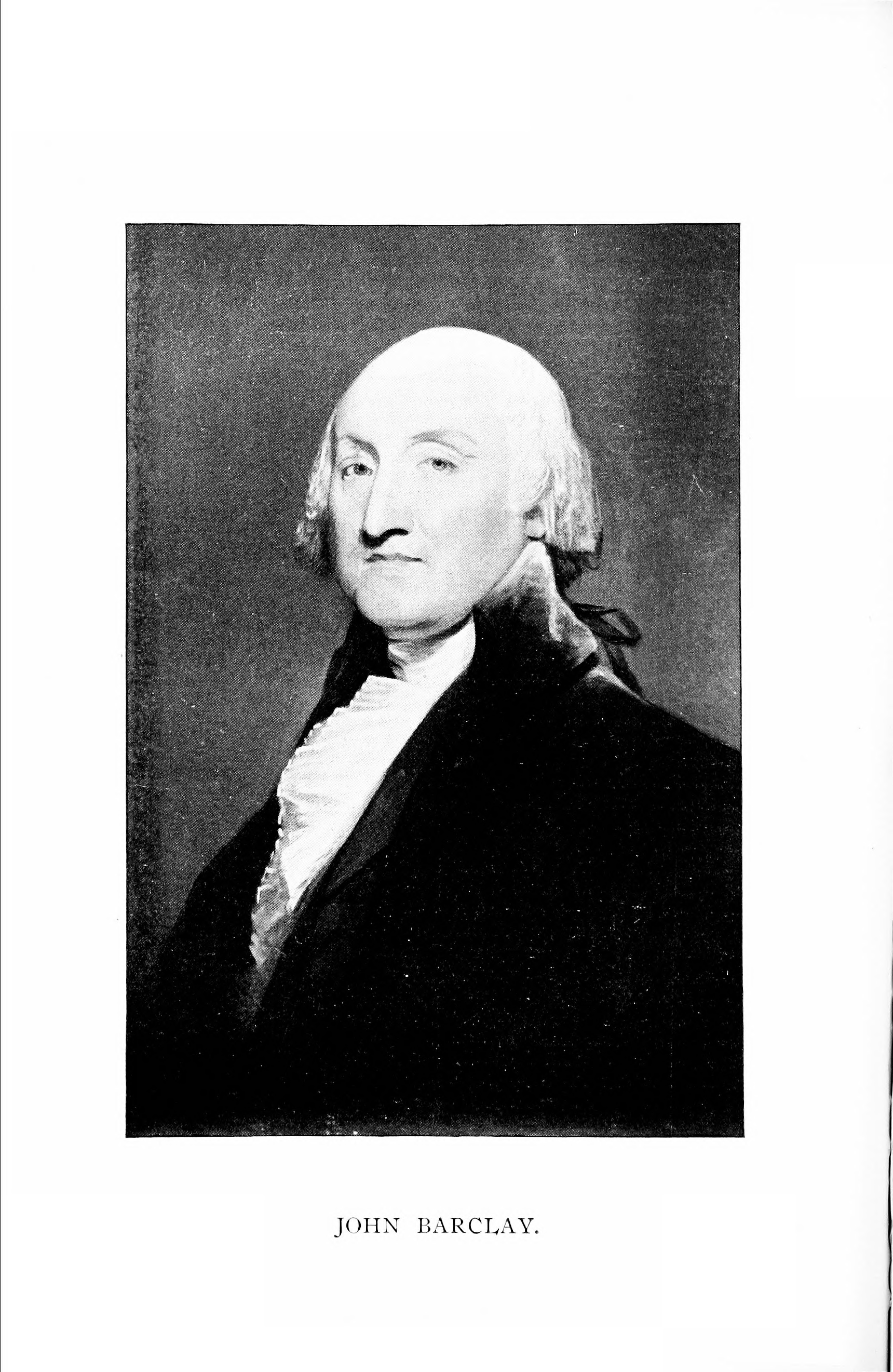

Mayor of Philadelphia
- In office 1791–1792

Member of the Pennsylvania Senate from the District 1 district
- In office 1811–1813

Personal details
- Born: January 22, 1749 Ballyshannon, Ireland
- Died: September 15, 1824 (aged 75) Philadelphia, Pennsylvania, U.S.
- Party: Federalist

John Barclay (January 22, 1749 – September 15, 1824) was an American soldier, politician, and jurist. He served in the Continental Army during the American Revolution. He served as President Judge of the Courts for Bucks County, Pennsylvania, alderman in Philadelphia, and Mayor of Philadelphia from 1791 to 1793. He worked as president of the Bank of Pennsylvania and was one of the founders of the Insurance Company of North America. He served as a Federalist member of the Pennsylvania State Senate for the 1st district from 1811 to 1813.

== Early life ==
Barclay was born in Ballyshannon, Ireland on January 22, 1749. He emigrated to colonial-era British America in 1778, as the American Revolutionary War entered its third year, and resided in the revolutionary capital of Philadelphia.

== Career ==
Once arriving in Philadelphia, Barclay obtained work as a shipping merchant, and served in the Continental Army during the American Revolutionary War. He enlisted in 1775 and was commissioned an ensign in 1776; he was eventually promoted to lieutenant and captain. He retired from the Continental Army in 1781.

He was appointed a justice of the peace in 1782 and rose to President Judge of the Courts of Bucks County in 1789.

Barclay was one of the 15 aldermen selected to serve in Philadelphia under the city charter of April 1790. He was a member of the Constitutional convention of 1790, and served as mayor of Philadelphia from 1791 to 1792. He was a candidate in the 1792 U.S. House election for Pennsylvania's 13 at-large seats, where the top 13 would be elected; he finished 16th.

He became president of the Bank of Pennsylvania after the Pennsylvania General Assembly established its charter in 1793.

He was one of the founders of the Insurance Company of North America in 1792, and served as a director of the company until 1793.

He was elected to the Pennsylvania State Senate for the 1st district, and served from 1811 to 1813.

== Personal life ==
He was married twice. He married his second wife, Mary Searle, at Christ Church in the present-day Old City section of Philadelphia on December 11, 1781, and they had five children.

== Death ==
He died in Philadelphia in 1824 and is interred in the Neshaminy Church Cemetery in Warwick Township, Pennsylvania.

== Legacy ==
The John Barclay Elementary School in Warrington, Pennsylvania, is named for him.

Political offices
Preceded by Samuel Miles	Mayor of Philadelphia; 1791	Succeeded by Matthew Clarkson

Pennsylvania State Senate
Preceded by Melchior Rahm	Member of the Pennsylvania Senate 1st District; 1811-1813	Succeeded by Nicholas Biddle
