= Hilary Baker =

American mayor

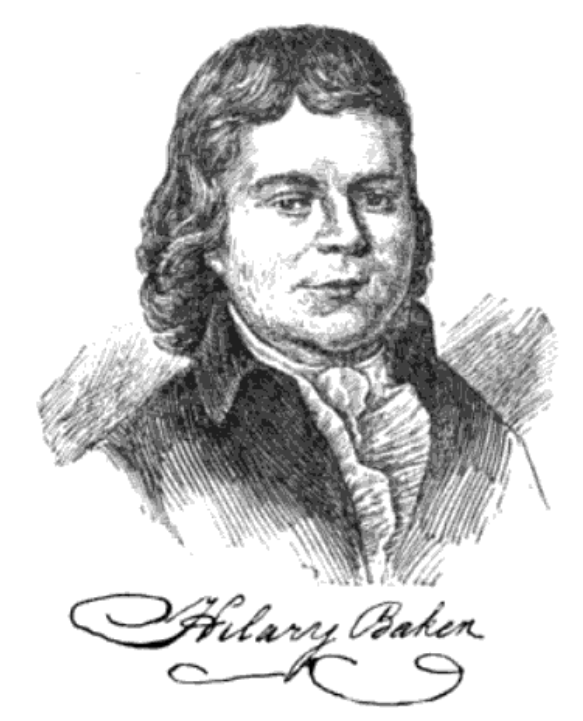

49th Mayor of Philadelphia
- In office October 18, 1796 – September 25, 1798
- Preceded by: Matthew Clarkson
- Succeeded by: Robert Wharton

Personal details
- Born: February 21, 1746
- Died: September 25, 1798 (aged 52) Philadelphia, Pennsylvania
- Resting place: Laurel Hill Cemetery

Hilary Baker (February 21, 1746 – September 25, 1798) was an American abolitionist and politician who served as the mayor of Philadelphia, Pennsylvania from 1796 to 1798. He helped found the Pennsylvania Abolition Society and created Philadelphia's first paid and uniformed police force. He was the first Philadelphia policeman to die in the line of duty.

== Biography ==
He began his career as a hardware merchant. He served in the Continental Army during the Revolutionary War. In 1779, he was clerk of the Court of Quarter Sessions in Philadelphia, and a member of the Pennsylvania Constitutional Convention of 1789 and 1790. Baker was elected alderman from 1789 to 1796, and elected mayor in 1796. He was re-elected in 1797.

He was a staunch abolitionist and helped organize the Pennsylvania Abolition Society.

During the 1798 yellow fever outbreak in Philadelphia, Baker remained in the city while other wealthy and influential citizens fled to the countryside for their safety. He established Philadelphia's first paid, uniformed police force of 20 watchmen to protect the city from vandalism and looting. He contracted yellow fever and died on September 25, 1798. He was originally interred at Zion Church at Eighth and Race Streets but was re-interred in Laurel Hill Cemetery.

Baker was the maternal grandfather of abolitionist and Union Army spy Elizabeth Van Lew.

Preceded by Matthew Clarkson	Mayor of Philadelphia; 1797–1798	Succeeded by Robert Wharton
