= Anthony Morris (II) =

American politician (1682–1763)

Mayor of Philadelphia
- In office 3 October 1738 – 2 October 1739
- Preceded by: Thomas Griffitts
- Succeeded by: Edward Roberts

Personal details
- Born: March 1682 London, England, Kingdom of England
- Died: 23 September 1763 (aged 81) Philadelphia, Pennsylvania, Great Britain
- Parent: Anthony Morris

Anthony Morris (March 1682 – September 23, 1763) was a brewer, merchant, judge, assemblyman, and mayor of Philadelphia.

== Early life and education ==
Morris was born in London, the son of Anthony Morris Jr. He emigrated with his family to colonial-era British America, where they settled in New Jersey shortly after his birth.

At age three, the family moved to Philadelphia, where Morris spent the rest of his life. Like his father, Morris was a prominent member of the Religious Society of Friends in Philadelphia.

== Career ==
=== Philadelphia brewing ===
In 1696, Morris' father paid fellow brewer Henry Babcock 20 pounds (equal to £3,264.64 today) to place the younger Anthony in a seven-year indentured apprenticeship.

Morris later founded the Morris Brewery, which emerged as one of the most highly regarded among colonial Philadelphia's many breweries.

=== Philadelphia politics ===
In 1737, Morris served as an associate justice of the city court. He sat for several sessions as a member of the assembly.

The following year, in 1738, like his father before him, he served as mayor of Philadelphia. He was re-elected the following year in 1739, but chose not to serve. In 1747, he was again elected, but fled the city to Bucks County to avoid having to serve. After three days of searching for Morris, a new election for mayor was scheduled.

== Death ==
On September 23, 1763, Morris died in Philadelphia, at age 81.

== Legacy ==
Morris's grandson, Samuel, was Captain of the First Troop Philadelphia City Cavalry during the American Revolutionary War, which served with distinction as General George Washington's bodyguard during 1776 and 1777.

== Sources ==
- Stanley Baron, Brewed in America: A History of Beer and Ale in the United States (Boston: Little, Brown and Company, 1962)

Attribution

Preceded by Thomas Griffitts	Mayor of Philadelphia; 1738–1739	Succeeded by Edward Roberts
