= Anthony Morris (I) =

American politician (1654–1721)

- Born: August 23, 1654
- Died: October 24, 1721
- Children: Anthony Morris

Anthony Morris Jr. (August 23, 1654 – October 24, 1721) was an American brewer, Quaker preacher, judge, and mayor of Philadelphia.

Note: Anthony Morris Jr. is denoted as Anthony Morris I resulting from the convention that he is the first Anthony Morris in the New World (despite being a Jr, and thus the second Anthony Morris). His son, Anthony, is known as the second Anthony Morris (in the New World) and also as Anthony Morris III.

== Career ==
Coat of Arms of Anthony Morris

Morris was born in Stepney, London. He emigrated to Burlington, New Jersey, in 1682, and relocated to Philadelphia three years later. In 1687, he built the original Morris Brewery, establishing a family business that would last until the 1830s. As the Francis Perot (and Sons) Malting Company, it endured into the 1960s as arguably the oldest continuous business in the United States. The original brewery was located on Front Street, south of Walnut. In 1745, Morris's grandson Anthony IV (son of the second Anthony Morris in Philadelphia) built a larger brewery at the corner of Dock and Pear (now Thomas Paine Place). At this location, Anthony IV's grandson, Benjamin Wistar Morris, brewed the preferred porter-style beer for President George Washington during the early 1790s.

In addition to serving Philadelphia as one of its leading brewers, Anthony Morris served in a variety of judicial capacities during the 1690s and was described by William Penn as "one of the most sufficient as well as diligent magistrates" in the colony. Among his roles was an appointment to the Supreme Court of Pennsylvania in 1694. In 1704, Morris became the city's mayor, a post later occupied by his son Anthony III, as well. Most of the older Anthony's attention after the turn of the 18th century, however, was devoted to preaching among the Society of Friends throughout North America.

Morris was clerk of the Monthly Meeting for the Society of Friends in the late 17th century after he moved to Philadelphia. He also raised money for the construction of Philadelphia's Friends' Meeting Houses as well as contributing generously himself. He was active in the buying and selling of real estate which was one of his major business activities, judging by a compilation of land transfers which is in the Philadelphia archives office. He died in Philadelphia, aged 67.

Preceded by Edward Shippen	Mayor of Philadelphia; 1703–1704	Succeeded by Griffith Jones
