= Samuel Hasell =

Mayor of Philadelphia (1691–1751)

Samuel Hasell (1691 – June 13, 1751) was Mayor of Philadelphia from 1731 to 1733 and 1740–41.

Hasell was born in Barbados in 1691. He arrived in Philadelphia in 1715. Among other public positions he held, he was elected a Common Councilman in 1728, Alderman in 1729, and Mayor in 1731, 1732, and 1740. He also served as Treasurer. He died in Philadelphia on June 13, 1751, and buried at Christ Church Burial Ground.

Hasell married Anne Bulkley around 1718, who gave birth to ten children, with seven living at the time of his death.

Preceded by Thomas Griffitts	Mayor of Philadelphia; October 6, 1731 - October 2, 1733	Succeeded by Thomas Griffitts
Preceded by Edwards Roberts	Mayor of Philadelphia; October 7, 1740 - October 6, 1741	Succeeded by Clement Plumsted
