= William Fishbourn =

American mayor (1677–1742)

- Position held: Mayor of Philadelphia

William Fishbourn or Fishbourne (June 25, 1677 in Talbot, Maryland – May 27, 1742 in Philadelphia) was a wealthy merchant and mayor of Philadelphia for three one-year terms, 1719 to 1722.

== Family ==
Fishbourn was the son of Ralph Fishbourne and Sarah Lewis.

Before 1700, he settled in Philadelphia. There, on January 8, 1702, he married Hannah Carpenter (March 3, 1685 – July 25, 1728), daughter of Samuel Carpenter, a deputy governor of Pennsylvania. After her death, he married Jane Roberts, daughter of Edward Roberts on June 29, 1729.

His granddaughter Elizabeth Fishbourne (September 1, 1752 – April 24, 1826) married President of Pennsylvania Thomas Wharton Jr.

Political offices
Preceded by Jonathan Dickinson	Mayor of Philadelphia; 1719–1722	Succeeded by James Logan
