= Mayor of Philadelphia =

Chief executives of Philadelphia, Pennsylvania

- Seal of the City of Philadelphia

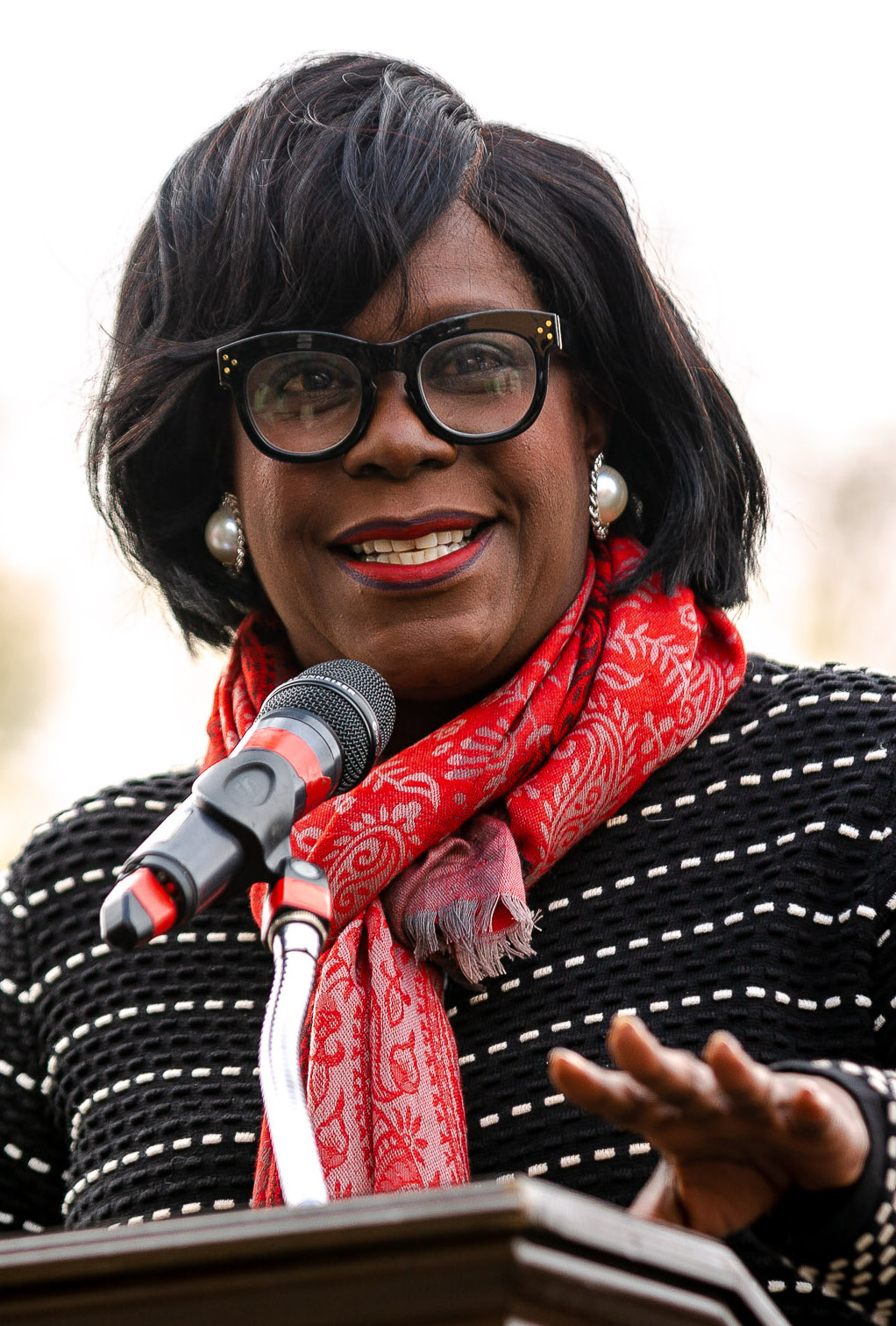
- Incumbent; Cherelle Parker since January 1, 2024
- Term length: four years limited to two consecutive terms
- Inaugural holder: Humphrey Morrey
- Formation: 1691
- Salary: $218,000
- Website: Office of the Mayor

The mayor of Philadelphia is the chief executive of the government of Philadelphia, Pennsylvania, as stipulated by the Charter of the City of Philadelphia. The current mayor of Philadelphia is Cherelle Parker, who is the first woman to hold the position.

== History ==
=== 18th century ===
The first mayor of Philadelphia was Humphrey Morrey, who was appointed to the position by William Penn, the founder of the city and the colonial-era Province of Pennsylvania, which became the state of Pennsylvania following the American Revolutionary War. Penn subsequently appointed Edward Shippen under the city charter of 1701. The Philadelphia City Council then elected Shippen to a second term. Subsequent mayors, who held office for one year, were elected by the Philadelphia City Council. The initial mayors of Philadelphia were not compensated and candidates sometimes objected strongly to being selected to the position, sometimes choosing even to pay a fine rather than serve in the position.

In 1704, alderman Griffith Jones was elected but declined to serve, for which he was fined twenty pounds. In 1706, Thomas Story, also an alderman, was similarly fined for refusing office.

In 1745, Abraham Taylor, a Philadelphia alderman, was fined thirty pounds for refusing to assume the office. The city council then elected Joseph Turner, who also refused and was likewise fined. Others who refused election included Richard Hill (1717), Issac Norris (1722), John Mifflin, and Alexander Stedman. In other cases, William Coxe pleaded illness (1758), Samuel Mifflin (1761), William Coxe and Daniel Benezet (1762), and John Barclay and George Roberts (1792). Robert Wharton declined in 1800 and 1811, and ended up 14 one-year terms, making him the most-often-elected (16 times, including refusals) and longest-serving (14 years) mayor in Philadelphia history.

In 1747, at the request of retiring Mayor William Attwood, Council resolved to institute an annual salary of 100 pounds for the office. The same year, Anthony Morris secretly fled to Bucks County to avoid being notified of his election as the city's mayor. When he could not be located after three days of searching, a new election was scheduled, and Attwood was reelected to a second term.

=== 19th century ===
In 1826, the Philadelphia City Council altered its protocols for electing a mayor, permitting any Philadelphia citizen to run for the office. Beginning in 1839, mayors were elected by popular vote. If no candidate won a majority of the popular vote, then the joint Councils (Select and Common) determined the winner between the two leading candidates. John Swift was the first mayor to be elected directly by the people in the 1840 Philadelphia mayoral election.

The term of office for the mayor was extended to two years in 1854, to three years in 1861, and to four years in 1885. The Act of 1885 also prohibited mayors from succeeding themselves.

=== 20th century ===
The consecutive term limitation for mayor was lifted in the 1940s, which permitted incumbent Bernard Samuel to run for reelection. In 1951, the city's Home Rule Charter established a two-term limit for Philadelphia mayors. The term limit is consecutive, not lifetime.

The mayor of Philadelphia has been held by Democrats for over seven decades, since 1952. The only Republican who has been competitive in the general election for mayor since then was Sam Katz, who came within half a percentage point of being the first Republican mayor of Philadelphia elected in 1999.

== List of Mayors ==
Parties

Democratic (18) Democratic-Republican (4) Federalist (6) Keystone (1) National Republican (2) Republican (19) Whig (5)

=== Colonial mayors elected by the Common Council ===
No.	Mayor	Term start	Term end	Mayorship	Term
1	Humphrey Morrey	May 20, 1691	October 25, 1701	1	1
2	Edward Shippen I	October 25, 1701	October 24, 1702	2	2
2	Edward Shippen I	October 24, 1702	October 5, 1703	2	3
3	Anthony Morris I	October 5, 1703	October 3, 1704	3	4
4	Griffith Jones	October 3, 1704	October 2, 1705	4	5
5	Joseph Willcox	October 2, 1705	October 1, 1706	5	6
6	Nathan Stanbury	October 1, 1706	October 7, 1707	6	7
7	Thomas Masters	October 7, 1707	October 5, 1708	7	8
7	Thomas Masters	October 5, 1708	October 4, 1709	7	9
8	Richard Hill	October 4, 1709	October 3, 1710	8	10
9	William Carter	October 3, 1710	October 2, 1711	9	11
10	Samuel Preston	October 2, 1711	October 7, 1712	10	12
11	Jonathan Dickinson	October 7, 1712	October 6, 1713	11	13
12	George Roach	October 6, 1713	October 5, 1714	12	14
(8)	Richard Hill	October 5, 1714	October 4, 1715	13	15
(8)	Richard Hill	October 4, 1715	October 2, 1716	13	16
(8)	Richard Hill	October 2, 1716	October 1, 1717	13	17
(11)	Jonathan Dickinson	October 1, 1717	October 7, 1718	14	18
(11)	Jonathan Dickinson	October 7, 1718	October 6, 1719	14	19
13	William Fishbourn	October 6, 1719	October 4, 1720	15	20
13	William Fishbourn	October 4, 1720	October 3, 1721	15	21
13	William Fishbourn	October 3, 1721	October 2, 1722	15	22
14	James Logan	October 2, 1722	October 1, 1723	16	23
15	Clement Plumsted	October 1, 1723	October 6, 1724	17	24
16	Isaac Norris	October 6, 1724	October 5, 1725	18	25
17	William Hudson	October 5, 1725	October 4, 1726	19	26
18	Charles Read	October 4, 1726	October 3, 1727	20	27
19	Thomas Lawrence I	October 3, 1727	October 2, 1728	21	28
19	Thomas Lawrence I	October 2, 1728	October 7, 1729	21	29
20	Thomas Griffitts	October 7, 1729	October 6, 1730	22	30
20	Thomas Griffitts	October 6, 1730	October 6, 1731	22	31
21	Samuel Hasell	October 6, 1731	October 3, 1732	23	32
21	Samuel Hasell	October 3, 1732	October 2, 1733	23	33
(20)	Thomas Griffitts	October 2, 1733	October 1, 1734	24	34
(19)	Thomas Lawrence I	October 1, 1734	October 7, 1735	25	35
22	William Allen	October 7, 1735	October 5, 1736	26	36
(15)	Clement Plumsted	October 5, 1736	October 4, 1737	27	37
(20)	Thomas Griffitts	October 4, 1737	October 3, 1738	28	38
23	Anthony Morris II	October 3, 1738	October 2, 1739	29	39
24	Edward Roberts	October 2, 1739	October 7, 1740	30	40
(21)	Samuel Hasell	October 7, 1740	October 6, 1741	31	41
(15)	Clement Plumsted	October 6, 1741	October 5, 1742	32	42
25	William Till	October 5, 1742	October 4, 1743	33	43
26	Benjamin Shoemaker	October 4, 1743	October 2, 1744	34	44
27	Edward Shippen III	October 2, 1744	October 1, 1745 (Note: Alexander Taylor and Joseph Turner refused election to the office of mayor.)	35	45
28	James Hamilton	October 1, 1745	October 7, 1746	36	46
29	William Attwood	October 7, 1746	October 6, 1747 (Note: After Attwood's first term, Anthony Morris II was elected mayor but fled to avoid taking office. Attwood was elected to a second term three days later.)	37	47
29	William Attwood	October 9, 1747	October 4, 1748	37	48
30	Charles Willing	October 4, 1748	October 3, 1749	38	49
(19)	Thomas Lawrence I	October 3, 1749	October 2, 1750	39	50
31	William Plumsted	October 2, 1750	October 1, 1751	40	51
32	Robert Strettell	October 1, 1751	October 3, 1752	41	52
(26)	Benjamin Shoemaker	October 3, 1752	October 2, 1753	42	53
(19)	Thomas Lawrence I	October 2, 1753	April 25, 1754 (Note: Died in office.)	43	54
(30)	Charles Willing	April 25, 1754	October 1, 1754	44	55
(30)	Charles Willing	October 1, 1754	December 4, 1754	44	56
(31)	William Plumsted	December 4, 1754	October 7, 1755	45	57
(31)	William Plumsted	October 7, 1755	October 5, 1756	45	58
33	Attwood Shute	October 5, 1756	October 4, 1757	46	59
33	Attwood Shute	October 4, 1757	October 3, 1758 (Note: John Mifflin, Alexander Stedman, and William Coxe refused election.)	46	60
34	Thomas Lawrence II	October 15, 1758	October 2, 1759	47	61
35	John Stamper	October 2, 1759	October 7, 1760	48	62
(26)	Benjamin Shoemaker	October 7, 1760	October 6, 1761 (Note: Samuel Mifflin refused election.)	49	63
36	Jacob Duché	October 6, 1761	October 5, 1762 (Note: William Coxe and Daniel Benezet refused election.)	50	64
37	Henry Harrison	October 5, 1762	October 4, 1763	51	65
38	Thomas Willing	October 4, 1763	October 2, 1764	52	66
(34)	Thomas Lawrence II	October 2, 1764	October 1, 1765	53	67
39	John Lawrence	October 1, 1765	October 7, 1766	54	68
39	John Lawrence	October 7, 1766	October 6, 1767	54	69
40	Isaac Jones	October 6, 1767	October 4, 1768	55	70
40	Isaac Jones	October 4, 1768	October 3, 1769	55	71
41	Samuel Shoemaker	October 3, 1769	October 2, 1770	56	72
41	Samuel Shoemaker	October 2, 1770	October 1, 1771	56	73
42	John Gibson	October 1, 1771	October 6, 1772	57	74
42	John Gibson	October 6, 1772	October 5, 1773	57	75
43	William Fisher	October 5, 1773	October 4, 1774	58	76
44	Samuel Rhoads	October 4, 1774	October 5, 1775	59	77
45	Samuel Powel	October 5, 1775	July 4, 1776 (Note: When the American Revolution began, the state abolished the city government, including the office of mayor.)	60	78

=== Post-independence mayors elected by the common council ===
No.	Mayor	Term start	Term end	Party	Mayorship	Term
(45)	Samuel Powel	April 11, 1789	April 12, 1790	Federalist	61	79
46	Samuel Miles	April 12, 1790	April 13, 1791	Federalist	62	80
47	John Barclay	April 13, 1791	April 13, 1792 (Note: John Barclay and George Roberts declined election.)	Federalist	63	81
48	Matthew Clarkson	April 13, 1792	April 3, 1793	Federalist	64	82
48	Matthew Clarkson	April 3, 1793	April 15, 1794	Federalist	64	83
48	Matthew Clarkson	April 15, 1794	April 6, 1795	Federalist	64	84
48	Matthew Clarkson	April 6, 1795	May 5, 1796	Federalist	64	85
48	Matthew Clarkson	May 5, 1796	October 18, 1796	Federalist	64	86
49	Hilary Baker	October 18, 1796	October 17, 1797	Federalist	65	87
49	Hilary Baker	October 17, 1797	October 16, 1798	Federalist	65	88
50	Robert Wharton	October 16, 1798	October 11, 1799	Federalist	66	89
50	Robert Wharton	October 11, 1799	October 21, 1800 (Note: Wharton declined reelection to a third term in 1800.)	Federalist	66	90
51	John Inskeep	October 21, 1800	October 16, 1801	Federalist (Note: As the Federalist Party collapsed in Pennsylvania, many Philadelphia politicians, including Inskeep, identified themselves as "Federal Republicans".)	67	91
52	Matthew Lawler	October 16, 1801	October 19, 1802	Democratic- Republican	68	92
52	Matthew Lawler	October 19, 1802	October 18, 1803	Democratic- Republican	68	93
52	Matthew Lawler	October 18, 1803	October 16, 1804	Democratic- Republican	68	94
52	Matthew Lawler	October 16, 1804	October 15, 1805	Democratic- Republican	68	95
(51)	John Inskeep	October 15, 1805	October 21, 1806	Federalist	69	96
(50)	Robert Wharton	October 21, 1806	October 20, 1807	Federalist	70	97
(50)	Robert Wharton	October 20, 1807	October 18, 1808	Federalist	70	98
53	John Barker	October 18, 1808	October 17, 1809	Democratic- Republican	71	99
53	John Barker	October 17, 1809	October 16, 1810	Democratic- Republican	71	100
(50)	Robert Wharton	October 16, 1810	October 15, 1811 (Note: Wharton declined reelection to a sixth term in 1811.)	Federalist	72	101
54	Michael Keppele	October 15, 1811	October 20, 1812	Democratic- Republican	73	102
(53)	John Barker	October 20, 1812	October 19, 1813	Democratic- Republican	74	103
55	John Geyer	October 19, 1813	October 18, 1814	Democratic- Republican	75	104
(50)	Robert Wharton	October 18, 1814	October 17, 1815	Federalist	76	105
(50)	Robert Wharton	October 17, 1815	October 15, 1816	Federalist	76	106
(50)	Robert Wharton	October 15, 1816	October 21, 1817	Federalist	76	107
(50)	Robert Wharton	October 21, 1817	October 20, 1818	Federalist	76	108
(50)	Robert Wharton	October 20, 1818	October 19, 1819	Federalist	76	109
56	James N. Barker	October 19, 1819	October 17, 1820	Democratic- Republican	77	110
(50)	Robert Wharton	October 17, 1820	October 16, 1821	Federalist	78	111
(50)	Robert Wharton	October 16, 1821	October 15, 1822	Federalist	78	112
(50)	Robert Wharton	October 15, 1822	October 21, 1823	Federalist	78	113
(50)	Robert Wharton	October 21, 1823	October 19, 1824	Federalist	78	114
57	Joseph Watson	October 19, 1824	October 18, 1825	National; Republican	79	115
57	Joseph Watson	October 18, 1825	October 18, 1826	National; Republican	79	116
57	Joseph Watson	October 18, 1826	October 16, 1827	National; Republican	79	117
57	Joseph Watson	October 16, 1827	October 21, 1828	National; Republican	79	118
58	George M. Dallas	October 21, 1828	April 15, 1829 (Note: Resigned to become the United States Attorney for the Eastern District of Pennsylvania.)	Democrat	80	119
59	Benjamin W. Richards	April 15, 1829	October 20, 1829	Democratic	81	120
60	William Milnor	October 20, 1829	October 19, 1830	National; Republican	82	121
(59)	Benjamin W. Richards	October 19, 1830	October 18, 1831	Democratic	83	122
(59)	Benjamin W. Richards	October 18, 1831	October 16, 1832	Democratic	83	123
61	John Swift	October 16, 1832	October 15, 1833	Whig	84	124
61	John Swift	October 15, 1833	October 21, 1834	Whig	84	125
61	John Swift	October 21, 1834	October 20, 1835	Whig	84	126
61	John Swift	October 20, 1835	October 18, 1836	Whig	84	127
61	John Swift	October 18, 1836	October 17, 1837	Whig	84	128
61	John Swift	October 17, 1837	October 16, 1838	Whig	84	129
62	Isaac Roach	October 16, 1838	October 15, 1839	Democratic	85	130

=== Mayors chosen by popular election ===
No.	Image	Mayor	Term start	Term end	Party	Mayorship	Term
(61)		John Swift	October 15, 1839	October 20, 1840	Whig	86	131
(61)		John Swift	October 20, 1840	October 19, 1841	Whig	86	132
63		John M. Scott	October 19, 1841	October 18, 1842	Whig	87	133
63		John M. Scott	October 18, 1842	October 10, 1843	Whig	87	134
63		John M. Scott	October 10, 1843	October 15, 1844	Whig	87	135
64		Peter McCall	October 15, 1844	October 21, 1845	Whig	88	136
(61)		John Swift	October 21, 1845	October 20, 1846	Whig	89	137
(61)		John Swift	October 20, 1846	October 19, 1847	Whig	89	138
(61)		John Swift	October 19, 1847	October 17, 1848	Whig	89	139
(61)		John Swift	October 17, 1848	October 16, 1849	Whig	89	140
65		Joel Jones	October 16, 1849	October 15, 1850	Democratic (Note: Jones was a Democrat elected with the support of the Know Nothing party.)	90	141
66		Charles Gilpin	October 15, 1850	October 21, 1851	Whig	91	142
66		Charles Gilpin	October 21, 1851	October 19, 1852	Whig	91	143
66		Charles Gilpin	October 19, 1852	October 18, 1853	Whig	91	144
66		Charles Gilpin	October 18, 1853	June 13, 1854	Whig	91	145

=== Mayors elected following the Act of Consolidation ===
No.	Image	Mayor	Term start	Term end	Party	Mayorship	Term (Note: In 1854, the entire county was consolidated into the city, and the mayoral term was extended to two years.)
67		Robert T. Conrad	June 13, 1854	May 13, 1856	Whig (Note: Conrad was a Whig elected with the Know Nothings' support.)	92	146
68		Richard Vaux	May 13, 1856	May 11, 1858	Democratic	93	147
69		Alexander Henry	May 11, 1858	May 8, 1860	Republican	94	148
69		Alexander Henry	May 8, 1860	January 1, 1863 (Note: In 1861, the mayoral term was extended to three years.)	Republican	94	149
69		Alexander Henry	January 1, 1863	January 1, 1866	Republican	94	150
70		Morton McMichael	January 1, 1866	January 1, 1869	Republican	95	151
71		Daniel M. Fox	January 1, 1869	January 1, 1872	Democratic	96	152
72		William S. Stokley	January 1, 1872	January 1, 1875	Republican	97	153
72		William S. Stokley	January 1, 1875	January 1, 1878	Republican	97	154
72		William S. Stokley	January 1, 1878	April 4, 1881	Republican	97	155
73		Samuel G. King	April 4, 1881	April 7, 1884	Democratic	98	156
74		William B. Smith	April 7, 1884	April 4, 1887	Republican	99	157
75		Edwin H. Fitler	April 4, 1887	April 6, 1891 (Note: In 1887, the mayoral term was extended to four years. Mayors could not serve consecutive terms.)	Republican	100	158
76		Edwin S. Stuart	April 6, 1891	April 1, 1895	Republican	101	159
77		Charles F. Warwick	April 1, 1895	April 3, 1899	Republican	102	160
78		Samuel H. Ashbridge	April 3, 1899	April 6, 1903	Republican	103	161
79		John Weaver	April 6, 1903	April 1, 1907	Republican	104	162
80		John E. Reyburn	April 1, 1907	December 4, 1911	Republican	105	163
81		Rudolph Blankenburg	December 4, 1911	January 3, 1916	Keystone (Note: Blankenburg was elected on the Keystone Party ticket with the support of the Democrats.)	106	164
82		Thomas B. Smith	January 3, 1916	January 5, 1920	Republican	107	165
83		J. Hampton Moore	January 5, 1920	January 7, 1924	Republican	108	166
84		W. Freeland Kendrick	January 7, 1924	January 2, 1928	Republican	109	167
85		Harry A. Mackey	January 2, 1928	January 4, 1932	Republican	110	168
(83)		J. Hampton Moore	January 4, 1932	January 6, 1936	Republican	111	169
86		Samuel D. Wilson	January 6, 1936	August 19, 1939	Republican	112	170
87		George Connell	August 9, 1939	January 1, 1940	Republican	113	171
88		Robert E. Lamberton	January 1, 1940	August 22, 1941	Republican	114	172
89		Bernard Samuel	August 22, 1941	January 3, 1944 (Note: During Samuel's first term, the prohibition on consecutive mayoral terms was removed.)	Republican	115	173
89		Bernard Samuel	January 3, 1944	January 5, 1948	Republican	115	174
89		Bernard Samuel	January 5, 1948	January 7, 1952	Republican	115	175

=== Mayors elected under the Home Rule Charter of 1951 ===
No.	Image	Mayor	Term start	Term end	Party	Mayorship	Term (Note: Under the City Charter of 1951, the mayor is limited to two consecutive, four-year terms.)
90		Joseph S. Clark Jr.	January 7, 1952	January 2, 1956	Democratic	116	176
91		Richardson Dilworth	January 2, 1956	January 4, 1960	Democratic	117	177
91		Richardson Dilworth	January 4, 1960	February 13, 1962 (Note: Resigned to run for governor.)	Democratic	117	178
92		James Tate	February 13, 1962	January 6, 1964	Democratic	118	179
92		James Tate	January 6, 1964	January 1, 1968	Democratic	118	180
92		James Tate	January 1, 1968	January 3, 1972	Democratic	118	181
93		Frank Rizzo	January 3, 1972	January 5, 1976	Democratic	119	182
93		Frank Rizzo	January 5, 1976	January 7, 1980	Democratic	119	183
94		William J. Green III	January 7, 1980	January 2, 1984	Democratic	120	184
95		Wilson Goode	January 2, 1984	January 4, 1988	Democratic	121	185
95		Wilson Goode	January 4, 1988	January 6, 1992	Democratic	121	186
96		Ed Rendell	January 6, 1992	January 1, 1996	Democratic	122	187
96		Ed Rendell	January 1, 1996	January 3, 2000	Democratic	122	188
97		John F. Street	January 3, 2000	January 5, 2004	Democratic	123	189
97		John F. Street	January 5, 2004	January 7, 2008	Democratic	123	190
98		Michael Nutter	January 7, 2008	January 2, 2012	Democratic	124	191
98		Michael Nutter	January 2, 2012	January 4, 2016	Democratic	124	192
99		Jim Kenney	January 4, 2016	January 7, 2020	Democratic	125	193
99		Jim Kenney	January 7, 2020	January 1, 2024	Democratic	125	194
100		Cherelle Parker	January 2, 2024	incumbent	Democratic	126	195

== See also ==
- History of Philadelphia
- Timeline of Philadelphia

== Sources ==
Books

- Young, John Russell (1898). Memorial History of the City of Philadelphia. New York, New York: New York History Company.

Websites

- "Mayors of Philadelphia". City of Philadelphia. January 13, 1998. Official Philadelphia Government list
