= Thomas Griffitts =

Irish-born American judge

Thomas Griffitts (1698 – 10 December 1746) was Mayor of Philadelphia on three occasions and judge of the Supreme Court of Pennsylvania.

Griffitts was born in Cork, Ireland, the son of George and Frances Griffitts. He was a Quaker. He emigrated from Ireland in 1716, arriving in Philadelphia via Kingston, Jamaica.

He was a provincial councillor from 1733 to 1742. He was Mayor of Philadelphia in 1729–1731, 1733–1734, and 1737–1738. He also served as Judge of the Supreme Court of Pennsylvania from 1739 to 1743.

Griffitts married Mary Norris, daughter of Isaac Norris, in 1717. They had four children, one of them Hannah Griffitts, but none left surviving issue. He died in Philadelphia in 1746.

Political offices
Preceded by Thomas Lawrence	Mayor of Philadelphia; 7 October 1729 – 6 October 1731	Succeeded by Samuel Hasell
Preceded by Samuel Hasell	Mayor of Philadelphia; 2 October 1733 – 1 October 1734	Succeeded by Thomas Lawrence
Preceded by Clement Plumsted	Mayor of Philadelphia; 4 October 1737 – 3 October 1738	Succeeded by Anthony Morris
