= Jonathan Dickinson =

American mayor and writer

- Born: 1663
- Died: 1722

Jonathan Dickinson (1663–1722) was a merchant from Port Royal, Jamaica, who was shipwrecked on the southeast coast of Florida in 1696, along with his family and the other passengers and crew members of the ship. He wrote about their experiences. The party was held captive by Jaega or "Jobe" ("Hoe-bay") Indians for several days, and then was allowed to travel by small boat and on foot the 230 miles up the coast to Saint Augustine. The party was subjected to harassment and physical abuse at almost every step of the journey to Saint Augustine. Five members of the party died from exposure and starvation on the way.

The Spanish authorities in Saint Augustine treated the surviving members of the party well, and sent them by canoe to Charles Town (now Charleston, South Carolina), where they were able to find passage to their original destination, Philadelphia. After many hardships, Jonathan Dickinson finally reached Philadelphia. He prospered there and twice served as Mayor of Philadelphia, in 1712–1713 and 1717–1719.

== Jonathan Dickinson's Journal ==
Dickinson wrote a journal of the ordeal, which was published by the Society of Friends in 1699 as

God's Protecting Providence Man's Surest Help and Defence in the times of the greatest difficulty and most Imminent danger Evidenced in the Remarkable Deliverance of divers Persons, from the devouring Waves of the Sea, amongst which they Suffered Shipwrack. And also from the more cruelly devouring jawes of the inhumane Canibals of Florida. Faithfully related by one of the persons concerned therein, Jonathan Dickenson (sic).

This book was reprinted sixteen times in English, and three times each in Dutch and German translations, between 1700 and 1869. Today it is more commonly known as Jonathan Dickinson's Journal. Dickinson's Journal has been described by the Cambridge History of English and American Literature as, "in many respects the best of all the captivity tracts".

== Early life ==
Jonathan Dickinson was born in 1663 in Jamaica. His father Francis had raised a troop of horse for Oliver Cromwell's Western Design expedition to capture Spanish possessions in the Caribbean, and had taken part in the English seizure of Jamaica in 1655, for which he had been rewarded with two plantations. Jonathan's brother Caleb stayed on the plantations while Jonathan became a merchant in the then chief port city of Jamaica, Port Royal. The earthquake of 1692, which nearly destroyed Port Royal, caused the Dickinson family great financial losses.

== Voyage and shipwreck ==
In 1696 Jonathan Dickinson left Jamaica with the intention of settling with his family in Philadelphia. Dickinson and his family, which included his wife, Mary, their six-month-old son, Jonathan, and his ten slaves, took passage on the barkentine Reformation. The Journal opens with a list of everybody on the Reformation which looks like the dramatis personae of a play. This list included the Commander (or Master) and the Mate of the Reformation, five sailors, "the Master's boy", "the Master's Negro", the Dickinsons and their slaves, Robert Barrow, a prominent Quaker preacher, Benjamin Allen, a "kinsman" of Dickinson, and Venus, "an Indian Girl".

The Reformation sailed from Port Royal on August 23, 1696 (Old Style), as part of a convoy under the protection of the Royal Navy frigate HMS Hampshire. While drifting in calm weather, the Reformation became separated from the convoy. On September 18 a sudden wind blew a boom across the quarterdeck, breaking the leg of the Master, Joseph Kirle. On the same date Venus, the Indian girl, died after being ill for several days. By September 20, the Reformation was still in the straits between Cuba and Florida trying to avoid ships of the French fleet that they believed to be in the area. On September 24, a storm, which may have been a hurricane, drove the ship onto a reef and then onto shore on Jupiter Island, Florida, a little ways north of Jupiter Inlet near present-day Hobe Sound.

All of the ship's party survived the shipwreck, and they soon began retrieving provisions and supplies from the wreck. Several of the party were sick, including the Dickinson infant, Robert Barrow, Benjamin Allen, and Joseph Kirle, whose leg had been broken a few days earlier. Within a few hours they were discovered by the local Jobe Indians (Dickinson spelled the name "Hoe-Bay"). The Jobes appropriated almost everything the shipwrecked party had brought out of the ship, and much that was still on the ship, although they showed no interest in the alcohol, sugar or molasses. The Jobes made threatening gestures and called the castaways "Nickaleer", by which they meant "English." Dickinson and Robert Barrow, being staunch Quakers, persuaded the others to not resist the Jobes, but to put their trust in God to protect them. One of the crewmen, Solomon Cresson, could speak Spanish well, and they resolved to say that they were Spanish. The Jobes acted as though they did not believe them, but may have been afraid of mistakenly treating Spanish nationals too harshly. The castaways indicated their desire to travel to Saint Augustine, but the Jobe cacique (which Dickinson spelled "Caseekey") wanted them to go to Havana, Cuba instead.

== Jobe ==
The Jobes took the castaways to their town at Jupiter Inlet. The Jobes continued to mistreat the castaways, stripping them of most of their clothes. On the other hand, a woman whom Dickinson believed to be the wife of the cacique nursed the Dickinson's infant son. When the Jobes offered the castaways food they were reluctant to eat, fearing that the Jobes wanted to fatten them for the cooking pot. Dickinson was troubled to hear one of the Jobes say in English, "English son of a bitch", which made him fear that the Jobes had previously held English captives.

The Jobes burned the wrecked Reformation, but brought the ship's boat to the town. On September 28, the party was allowed to leave the Jobe village, heading north to Saint Augustine. They were able to take some supplies that the Jobes did not want, including some wine, butter, sugar, and chocolate, and one of the ship's quadrants. One of Dickinson's slaves had kept a tinderbox and flint, and the party also had a couple of knives. To Dickinson's dismay, the Jobe Cacique insisted on keeping one of Dickinson's slaves, a boy named Caesar.

The journey up the coast was difficult. The weak and sick members of the party were put in the ship's boat with some men to row it, while the rest walked along the shore. Drinking water was in short supply. They passed villages where the shore party would be harassed, but the travelers in the boat refused to land, fearing what treatment they would receive once all were on shore. They wanted to reach the town of Santa Lucea (just across the Old Indian River Inlet located just north of the modern, artificial Fort Pierce Inlet), even though Indians in the villages they passed warned that they would be killed there. As the town had a Spanish name, they hoped to find some sort of Spanish authority there.

== Santa Lucea ==
On September 30 the party encountered Ais Indians from Santa Lucea, who called them "Nickaleer" even though Solomon Cresson was speaking Spanish to them. They forcefully stripped the travelers, including the Dickinson infant, of all their remaining clothing, although one of the Indians afterwards gave a pair of breeches to Dickinson's wife. The Indians tore pages from a Bible the group carried and gave them to the travelers to cover themselves, but other Indians snatched away the pages. The Indians also threatened the travelers with arrows and knives. The party was taken to the town, and the travelers were eventually given local clothing, deer skins for the women and a sort of breechclout-apron for the men. The Indians finally fed the travelers. As Mary Dickinson's milk was failing, several women in the village nursed the Dickinson infant.

The Indians of Santa Lucea were finally convinced that some of the travelers were Spanish. They did not think that the travelers with light-colored hair were Spanish, however. They told the travelers that they would be sent on to the next town. They also told the travelers that some "English off Bristol", six men and a woman, were being held at that town, and that the prisoners would be killed before the Reformation party reached there.

In the middle of the night the travelers were suddenly forced to leave the town, and were escorted four miles up the beach by a crowd throwing rocks at them. At this point they realized that Solomon Cresson, Joseph Kirle's cabin boy, John Hilliard, and his slave, Ben, were not with them. The three remaining escorts kept them moving, repeatedly asking them if they were "Nickaleer". When the travelers said they were not, the escorts hit them. On October 2 the travelers passed the shipwreck they had heard of.

== Jece ==
At Jece (the chief town of the Ais), near present-day Sebastian, they were welcomed and given some pieces of clothing. They met the survivors of the shipwreck they had passed, which was the Nantwitch, part of the convoy from Port Royal. The Nantwitch had been driven ashore by the same storm that wrecked the Reformation. Later that evening the stragglers caught up with the main group. Solomon Cresson said he had been detained at Santa Lucea, while John Hilliard and Ben had been asleep in another house when the party was driven out of town.

Upon hearing from the travelers what had been taken from them by the Cacique of Jobe, the Cacique of Jece, who appeared to be the paramount chief of the Ais, decided to go to Jobe to claim part of the plunder. While he was gone the town was hit by a severe storm, probably a hurricane, that flooded the town and nearly drowned the party. The cacique returned on October 11, bringing part of the goods plundered from the shipwreck, and the boy Caesar, who had been kept behind by the Cacique of Jobe. The cacique recognized that the goods from the Reformation were English, and now strongly doubted that the travelers were Spanish.

The cacique indicated that he planned to travel to Saint Augustine, and would take one of the shipwrecked party with him. They eventually decided to send Solomon Cresson, as they feared the Indians living closer to Saint Augustine would know enough Spanish to recognize that the other members of the shipwreck party were not Spanish. The cacique left for Saint Augustine on October 18, taking Solomon Cresson and much of the money that the Jobes had taken from the Reformation. The cacique told them it would be about a month before he returned.

The stranded party suffered while the cacique was gone. The Indians of this part of the Florida coast did not cultivate crops, but lived on fish, shellfish and palmetto, cocoplum and seagrape berries in season. The berries were gone by this time, and the Jeces seldom gave the stranded party fish. They were reduced to eating the gills and guts of fish taken from a "dung-hill", as Dickinson puts it. The party from the Reformation continued to worry about their fate. The Indians of Jece would alternately threaten the Reformation party and then tell them how they planned to kill the Nantwitch survivors.

Mary Dickinson's milk was failing. Some women of the town would occasionally nurse the Dickinson infant, but there were other mothers in the town with insufficient milk, so there was little to spare for him. When a woman who had recently given birth, but had no milk, gave her child to Mary Dickinson to nurse, Mary did so, although she had little milk herself. This turned out to be to her benefit, however, as the Indians started giving her fish to eat so that she could produce enough milk for the Indian new-born, as well as her own child.

== Spanish soldiers ==
On November 2 a squad of Spanish soldiers from Saint Augustine arrived in the town. They had brought the cacique back with them, but Solomon Cresson had been sent on to Saint Augustine. The Spanish soldiers treated the English castaways kindly, but were harsh to the Indians. The next day they sent some of the English survivors from both ships north towards Saint Augustine on a catamaran they constructed from two canoes. The Spanish also sent for the Reformation's boat that had been left in Santa Lucea. On November 5 the rest of the English survivors departed for Saint Augustine in the boats from the two wrecked ships. This group quickly caught up with the first group.

The combined party continued their journey with the Spanish escort. Food remained in short supply for the English party. The Spanish soldiers shared very little from their own supplies, and on one occasion the castaways had only boiled pumpkin leaves for their meal. On November 9 the escort of Spanish soldiers turned back south towards the two wrecked ships, leaving only one of them to guide the party to Saint Augustine. On November 10 the party was quartered in two adjacent towns of the Timucua people. The Spanish soldiers had told the English castaways that a group of stranded Dutch sailors had been killed and eaten in one of those towns a year earlier.

On November 13 the party had to abandon their boats and walk along the shore. In their hurry to get to a Spanish sentinels' house that was near, the stronger members of the party pressed on, leaving the weaker behind. It was cold and the travelers, having little clothing, suffered greatly from it. Five of the group died of exposure that day: Dickinson's kinsman, Benjamin Allen, and four of his slaves, Jack, Caesar, Quenza, and a child named Cajoe.

== Saint Augustine to Charles Town ==
The Spanish soldiers at the sentinels' house had limited food supplies, and pushed the reluctant castaways to move on to the next sentinels' house. There were three sentinels' houses south of Saint Augustine that the travelers passed in succession. Dickinson reached Saint Augustine on November 15. He found that all of the English there were being well treated by the Spanish. Dickinson, his wife and child, and Joseph Kirle and John Smith, the Master of the Nantwitch, stayed in the governor's house.

The party of survivors left Saint Augustine in canoes on November 29. The governor had provided them with what supplies could be found in Saint Augustine. An escort of Spanish soldiers went with them. They stopped at Spanish outposts and Indian villages at night when they could, or camped on islands along the coast. On December 21 they reached the most southerly of the South Carolina plantations. They arrived in Charles Town on December 26.

== Philadelphia ==
On March 18, 1696 (Old Style, the year number not changing until March 25), Jonathan Dickinson and his family and Robert Barrow sailed from Charles Town, reaching Philadelphia fourteen days later. On April 4, 1697, three days after reaching Philadelphia, Robert Barrow died.

Jonathan Dickinson prospered in Philadelphia. He and his wife Mary had four children. He twice served as Mayor of Philadelphia, in 1712–1713 and 1717–1719. Jonathan Dickinson died in 1722.

== Notes ==
Preceded by Samuel Preston	Mayor of Philadelphia; 1712–1713	Succeeded by George Roch
Preceded by Richard Hill	Mayor of Philadelphia; 1717–1719	Succeeded by William Fishbourn
