= Edward Roberts (mayor) =

Mayor of Philadelphia

Edward Roberts (c.1680 – c.1741) was a colonial mayor of Philadelphia. Upon emigrating to the United States he became a prosperous merchant and landowner. He served as Mayor of Philadelphia from 1739 to 1740.

== Background ==
Roberts was born in Llanvawr, Merionethshire, Wales, the third son of Hugh Roberts, a prominent Quaker preacher. Roberts emigrated to the United States as a child when his father moved to the colonies in 1684 to bring his ministry to the people there. Roberts' father was a successful minister and property speculator upon arrival in Pennsylvania. Edward Roberts would inherit a 200-acre property, "Chestnut Hill" from his father, land that would later become part of Fairmount Park.

Roberts became a freeman of Philadelphia in 1717. That year, he served as a town councilman.

In 1736, he was one of the signers of the Articles creating the Union Fire Company to develop what would become the first volunteer fire department in the United States in Philadelphia. He was elected Mayor on October 2, 1739. Roberts was said to use a seal that included "a rose, under a crown, between two human hearts" for his correspondence.

=== Personal life ===
He had four children, Hugh, Jane, Mary and Susannah Elizabeth. His son, Hugh Roberts (1706–1786) was a Philadelphia merchant known as one of Benjamin Franklin's closest friends. His daughter Jane, would marry William Fishbourne, mayor of Philadelphia. His daughter, Susannah Elizabeth, married doctor Thomas Bond in 1735. Mary married Mordecai Yarnall.

In 1741 Roberts died in Philadelphia County, now Montgomery County, Pennsylvania.

| Preceded by Anthony Morris | Mayor of Philadelphia; 1739−1740 | Succeeded by Samuel Hasell |
