= Richard Hill (Pennsylvania politician) =

American judge

Richard Hill (c. 1652 in England – September 4, 1729, in Philadelphia) was an English merchant seaman who immigrated to the Maryland colony in 1673, moved to Pennsylvania in 1703, and subsequently served four terms as the 8th and 13th mayor of Philadelphia.

== Background ==
Richard Hill was born in England circa 1652 and immigrated to the Maryland colony in 1673. From there he roamed the sea until 1703, and was called Captain Richard Hill.

Living in Philadelphia at the time of the second visit of William Penn, Pennsylvania's proprietor and founder, he made Penn's acquaintance and became his friend. Hill soon settled in Philadelphia as a merchant and was admitted to the Governor's Council of the colony in February 1704, retaining the position up to the time of his death.

In 1707, he was unanimously elected alderman of the city, and in 1709 was chosen mayor, to which office he was three times re-elected.

He was elected to the Pennsylvania Provincial Assembly in 1710 and served in this body continuously until 1721, also serving three times as speaker.

In 1720, as one of the six oldest councilors, he was appointed a master in the court of chancery, just organized, and was also for several years a judge of the Supreme Court of the province. In the quarrels that arose between the assembly and Penn, Hill sided with Penn, and he is recognized as the leader that did most to preserve Quaker and proprietary ascendancy. William Penn made him a trustee under his will.

| Preceded by Thomas Masters | Mayor of Philadelphia; 1709–1710 | Succeeded by William Carter |
| Preceded by George Roch | Mayor of Philadelphia; 1714–1717 | Succeeded by Jonathan Dickinson |
