= George Roach (mayor) =

Colonial mayor of Philadelphia

12th Mayor of Philadelphia
- In office October 6, 1713 – October 4, 1714
- Preceded by: Jonathan Dickinson
- Succeeded by: Richard Hill

Personal details
- Died: November 1744

George Roach (also spelled Roch; died November 1744) was the 12th Mayor of Philadelphia, serving during the colonial era.

== Career ==
Roach began merchanting in Philadelphia in 1703, having arrived around that time from Antigua. He had been trading with London companies. and served in the Pennsylvania justice system from 1704 until 1716. He was a member of the Provincial Council of Pennsylvania from 1704 to 1716, an alderman from 1708 onwards, and later served as Mayor of Philadelphia from October 6, 1713, to October 5, 1714.

== Personal life ==
Roach died in November 1744.
