= Clement Plumsted =

Mayor of Philadelphia

- Born: 1680
- Died: May 26, 1745

Coat of Arms of Clement Plumsted

Clement Plumsted (bapt. 2 May 1680 – 26 May 1745) was native of Norfolk and among the East Jersey proprietors associated with William Penn. A wealthy Quaker merchant, he served as mayor of Philadelphia in 1723, 1736, and 1741, as well as a Philadelphia councilman, alderman, and justice, and member of the Pennsylvania Provincial Council. He was also the father of William Plumsted, who also served as mayor of Philadelphia.

In October 1742, Plumsted was mayor during a riot later referred to as the "bloody election" where prominent members of the Proprietary Party hired sailors to "knock the Dutch off the steps" of the courthouse where elections were being held. The riot was said to be instigated by William Allen, and Plumsted was said to have not done anything to stop the violence which he excused due to age and illness.

Preceded by James Logan	Mayor of Philadelphia; 1723–1724	Succeeded by Isaac Norris
Preceded by William Allen	Mayor of Philadelphia; 1736–1737	Succeeded by Thomas Griffitts
Preceded by Samuel Hasell	Mayor of Philadelphia; 1741–1742	Succeeded by William Till
