= Philadelphia grant =

Philadelphia Grant

The Philadelphia grant describes 200,000 acres (81,000 ha) of land along the south shore of the Northumberland Strait between Tatamagouche and Pictou, Nova Scotia. Following expulsion of the Acadians, the British government distributed Acadian land to various landlords under the condition those landlords oversee repopulation of those lands with colonists loyal to King George III of the United Kingdom.

== Grant conditions ==
In October 1765, the Philadelphia grant was awarded to a group of businessmen from Philadelphia: John Bayard, George Bryan, Edmund Crawley, Robert Harris, Thomas Harris, Andrew Hodge, James Lyon, David Rhea, John Rhea, Jonathan Bayard Smith, Richard Stockton, William Symonds, Isaac Wykoff, and John Wykoff. The Philadelphia Company formed by these businessmen agreed to pay a quit-rent of one farthing per acre for half of the grant by 1770 and for the remainder of the grant by 1775. The Philadelphia Company was also obligated to populate the grant with at least one-thousand Protestant settlers by 1775.

== History ==
Land west of the Philadelphia grant was granted to Joseph Frederick Wallet DesBarres and land east of the Philadelphia grant to Alexander McNutt. McNutt's grant included most of the land adjacent to Pictou Harbour and DesBarres' grant included all of Tatamagouche Bay. The Philadelphia grant extended inland as far as Stewiacke, but was comparatively unappealing because there were no similar harbors along its shoreline in the era when ships were the primary means of communication and commerce with the outside world. The Philadelphia Company sent the brig Hope with six families from Maryland to settle near Pictou Harbour, and some of DesBarres' disenchanted tenants moved onto the western Philadelphia grant near River John; but most of the Philadelphia grant remained the forested realm of the Mi'kmaq through the 18th century. The grant conditions were never fulfilled, and the Philadelphia grant was escheated.
