= Plumstead (disambiguation) =

Plumstead is a district in London.

Plumstead may also refer to:

- Plumstead District (Metropolis), later Lee District (Metropolis), a former local government district in London
- Plumstead, Cape Town, suburb in the Western Cape Province of South Africa
- Plumstead, Norfolk, eastern England
- Plumstead Township, Pennsylvania, United States
- Great and Little Plumstead, Norfolk, England

== See also ==
- Plumsted Township, New Jersey, United States
