= List of ships named Nancy =

Nancy, may refer to a number of ships:

- Nancy (1775) was an American brig that her crew scuttled in 1776 near Cape May, New Jersey during the Battle of Turtle Gut Inlet.
- Nancy (1774 EIC ship) was a packet ship that the British East India Company (EIC) launched in 1774 at Bombay and that was wrecked on the Isles of Scilly in February 1784.
- Nancy (1788 ship) was launched in Newfoundland in 1788. Initially, she traded between Bristol and Newfoundland and then Bristol and Lisbon. After a change in ownership in 1791, she traded between Bristol and Africa. The French captured her in 1794.
- Nancy (1789 ship) was a schooner launched in 1789 that served for several years as a supply ship for the Provincial Marine, and that in 1814 became HMS Nancy; her crew scuttled her in 1814.
- Nancy (1792 ship) was launched in 1792 at Deptford and traded with Quebec. In 1793 she made one voyage for the British East India Company (EIC). On her return, the Sierra Leone Company purchased her. As she traded with Sierra Leone, a French privateer captured her, though the British Royal Navy recaptured her only days later. She then traded more widely. In 1805 a French squadron captured her in 1805 and burnt her.
- Nancy (1803 ship) was a sloop launched in 1803 and wrecked in 1805 near Jervis Bay, Australia.

== See also ==
- HMS Nancy, any of several Royal Navy warships
