= James Logan (statesman) =

Mayor of Philadelphia (1674–1751)

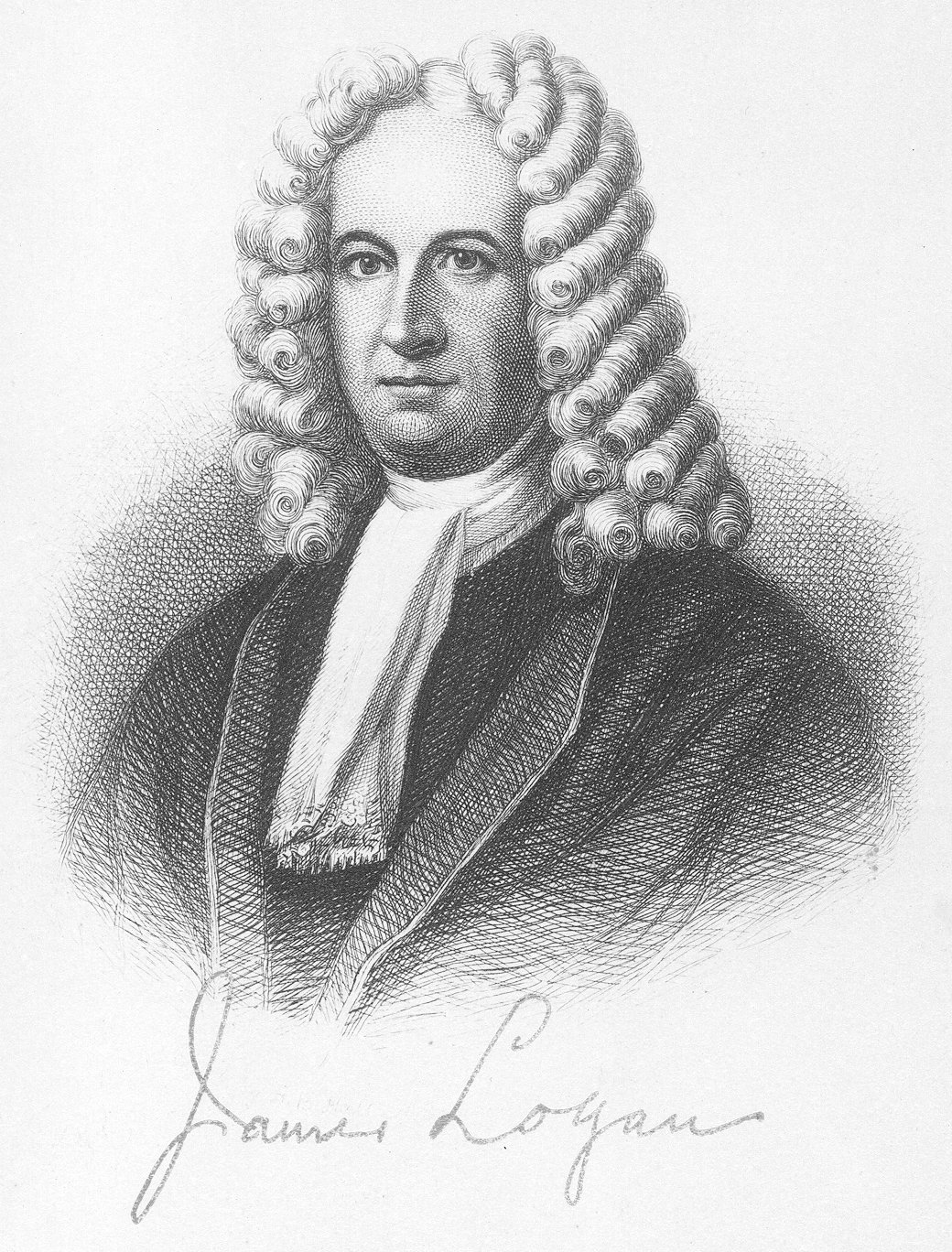
- An illustration of Logan and his signature, c. 1740
- Born: 20 October 1674; Lurgan, County Armagh, Kingdom of Ireland
- Died: 31 October 1751 (aged 77); Philadelphia, Pennsylvania, British America
- Occupations: statesman, scholar
- Known for: Founder and Trustee of University of Pennsylvania

James Logan (20 October 1674 – 31 October 1751) was a Scots-Irish colonial American statesman, administrator, and scholar who served as the fourteenth mayor of Philadelphia and held a number of other public offices.

Logan was born in the town of Lurgan in County Armagh, Ireland to Ulster Scots Quakers. He served as colonial secretary to William Penn. He was a founding trustee of the College of Philadelphia, the predecessor of the University of Pennsylvania.

== Early life ==
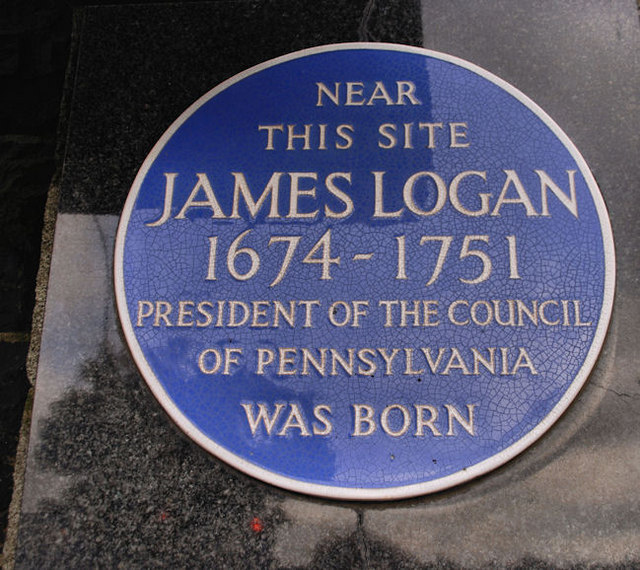
A present-day plaque honoring Logan in the city of his birth, in Lurgan, in Northern Ireland

Logan was born in Lurgan, County Armagh in present-day Northern Ireland, on 20 October 1674, to parents Patrick Logan (1640–1700) and Isabella, Lady Hume (1647–1722), who married in early 1671, in Midlothian, Scotland. His father had a Master of Arts degree from the University of Edinburgh, and originally was an Anglican clergyman before converting to Quakerism.

James Logan apprenticed with a Dublin-based linen draper, received a good classical and mathematical education, and acquired a knowledge of modern languages not common at the period. The War of 1689–91 obliged him to follow his parents, first to Edinburgh, and then to London and Bristol, England where, in 1693, James replaced his father as schoolmaster. In 1699, he came to the colony of Pennsylvania aboard the Canterbury as William Penn's secretary. Logan is described as "tall and well-proportioned, with a graceful yet grave demeanor. He had a good complexion, and was quite florid, even in old age; nor did his hair, which was brown, turn grey in the decline of life, nor his eyes require spectacles."

== Career ==
Logan supported proprietary rights in the colonial-era Province of Pennsylvania and became a major landowner in the growing colony; he was also a slave-owner. Logan advanced through several political offices, including clerk (1701), commissioner of property (1701), receiver general (1703), and member of the provincial council (1703).

In 1717, Logan's mother came to live with him in Philadelphia; she died on 17 January 1722, at his family home at Stenton in present-day neighbourhood of Logan, named in Logan's honour, in Philadelphia.

=== Philadelphia and Pennsylvania government ===
In 1722, Logan was elected mayor of Philadelphia. During his tenure as mayor, Logan allowed Irish Catholic immigrants to participate in the city's first public Mass. He later served as the colony's chief justice from 1731 to 1739, and in the absence of a governor of Pennsylvania, became acting governor from 1736 to 1738.

On October 9, 1736, Logan responded to requests from Native American leaders to control the sale of alcohol, which was creating serious social problems, by prohibiting the sale of rum in indigenous communities, but since the penalty was merely a fine of ten pounds and the law was poorly enforced, it did not have a significant effect.

During his tenure as acting governor, Logan played an active role in the territorial expansion of the colony. While William Penn and his immediate successors pursued a policy of friendly relations with the Lenape Indian tribe, Logan and other colony proprietors, including William Penn's indebted sons, John, Richard and Thomas Penn, pursued a policy of land acquisition. Such efforts to expand were spurred by increased immigration to the colony and fears that the New York Colony was infringing on Pennsylvania's northern borders in the Upper Delaware river valley. In addition, many proprietors (including Logan and the Penn brothers) had engaged in extensive land speculation, selling off lands occupied by the Lenape to new colonists before concluding an official treaty with the tribe.

==== Walking Purchase ====
As part of his efforts to expand Pennsylvania, Logan signed the Walking Purchase with the Lenape, forcing the tribe to vacate lands in the present-day Lehigh Valley and Northeastern Pennsylvania in Pennsylvania and parts of present-day western New Jersey under the auspices of the tribe having committed to sell the lands to William Penn in 1686, a treaty whose ratifying document is considered by some sources to have been a fabrication, but which was upheld in several federal lawsuits in the early 21st century.

Under the terms of the treaty, the Lenape agreed to cede as much territory as a man could walk in one and one-half days to the Pennsylvania colony; however, Logan used the treaty's vague wording, the Lenape's unclear diplomatic status, and a heavily influenced (scouts were sent ahead to clear the path of the runners selected to represent the colony) "walk" to claim a much larger territory than was originally expected by the Lenape. Meanwhile, Logan preemptively negotiated with the powerful Iroquois Confederacy to allow for the treaty to take place. As a result, the Iroquois (nominally the diplomatic overlords and protectors of the Lenape people) rebuffed Lenape attempts to have the Iroquois intervene on their behalf. The net result of the Walking Treaty was an increase in the colony's size of over 1,200,000 acres, the scattering of the Lenape in a regional diaspora, and the breakdown of diplomatic relations between Pennsylvania and the tribe.

=== Wealth and writings ===
Throughout his life in the Province of Pennsylvania, Logan engaged in various mercantile pursuits, especially fur trading, with such success that he became one of the wealthiest men in the Thirteen Colonies. Logan authored several scholarly papers published by the American Philosophical Society and European journals. Logan was also a natural scientist whose primary contribution to the emerging field of botany was a treatise that described experiments on the impregnation of plant seeds, especially corn. He tutored John Bartram, the American botanist, in Latin and introduced him to Linnaeus.

Logan's daughter, Sarah, married Isaac Norris, a Philadelphia businessman and statesman.

== Death ==
Logan died in 1751 in Stenton in the present-day Logan neighbourhood, named in Logan's honour, in Philadelphia at the age of 77. He was interred in the graveyard of Arch Street Friends Meeting House, built in 1804, in Philadelphia.

== Colonial bibliophile ==
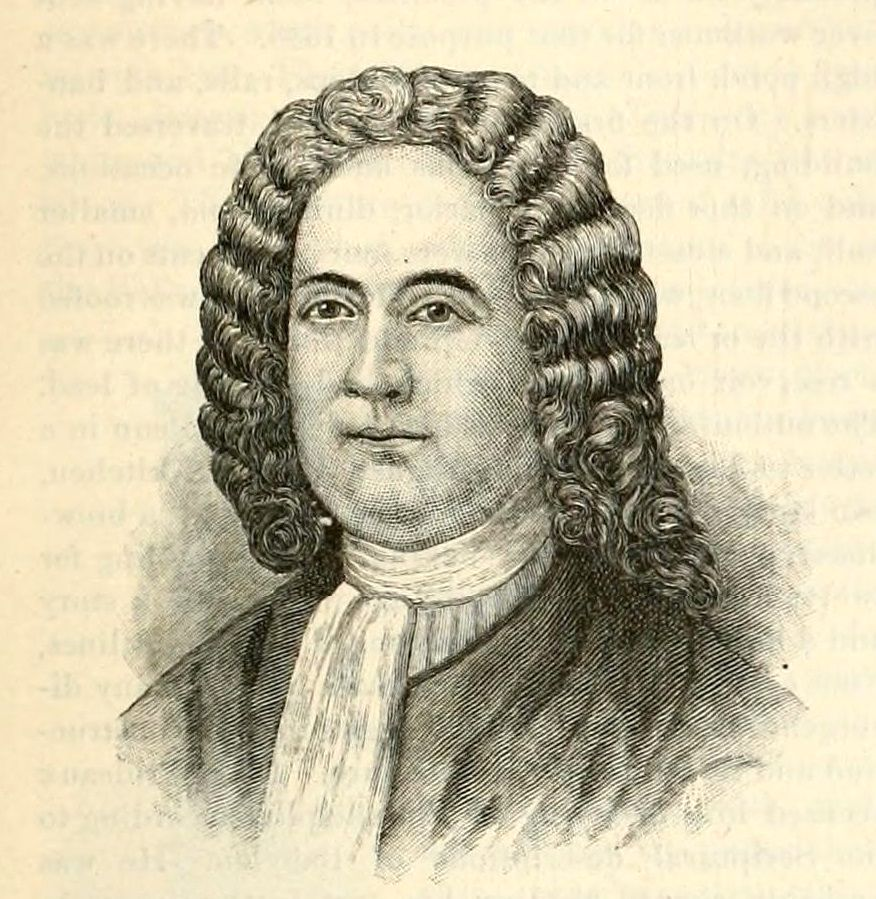
James Logan, engraving

While Logan would eventually become mayor of Philadelphia, chief justice of the Pennsylvania Supreme Court, lieutenant governor, and acting governor he is perhaps best known for being a bibliophile, confessing once that "Books are my disease". He collected a personal library of over 3,000 volumes. Some commentators consider Logan's library to have been the largest and best collection of classical writings in America at that time.

Logan would in time become known to Benjamin Franklin and his "Junto"; an influential group of friends that would meet weekly and discuss scholarly and political issues. He became a mentor to Franklin, who published Logan's translation of Cicero's essay "Cato Maior de Senectute". Eventually, the Junto decided to establish a subscription library, a cooperative endeavour where members would pay a fee for use of the library. Franklin and the other members of the Junto considered Logan the "best Judge of Books in these parts" and chose him to select the first 43 titles for the Library Company of Philadelphia.

At the same time Logan was helping to build the collection for the Library Company of Philadelphia, he was adding to his own personal library which was considered substantial in number and breadth. He planned on donating his library for public use after his death and to this end he had a building constructed on Sixth Street in Philadelphia. Upon Logan's death, and after a lengthy delay due to some confusion in his will, through an act of the Pennsylvania Assembly and the governor on March 31, 1792, the 3,953 volumes and other property of the Loganian Library were "vested in the Library Company of Philadelphia, their successors and assigns, for ever, in trust for the support and increase of the said Loganian Library."

=== The Loganian Library ===
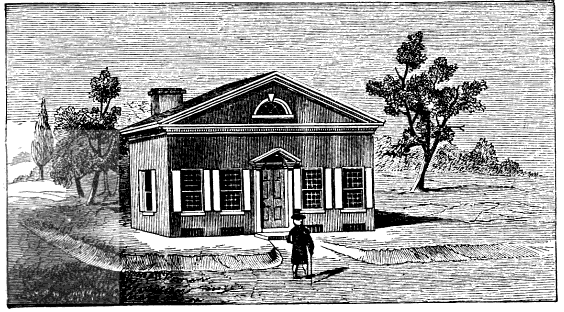
Loganian Library Philadelphia, 18th century

The Loganian Library, as he wished it to be called, was diverse. The catalogue of its final holdings is now lost but a partial inventory done in 1760 reveals a wide selection of books. The book distribution by date reveals nothing out of the ordinary. Most were from the seventeenth century with 57 percent. Next came those from the eighteenth century at 27 percent. Finally, there was a good number from the fifteenth and sixteenth centuries at 16 percent. The collection was mostly British and northern European with 33 percent from Britain; the Netherlands, 24 percent; Germany, 17 percent; France, 13 percent; Switzerland, 9 percent; Italy, 2 percent; and others (Scandinavia, Spain, Poland, Russia, America) at 2 percent

The distribution of the books by subject in the 1760 catalogue is equally diverse with history, antiquities, geography, chronology, etc. at 22 percent. Religious subjects of divinity and ecclesiastical history constituted 15 percent. Scientific subjects such as "physick," "mathematicks", and natural history was at 16 percent. Literary subjects such as orators, poets, fables, romances, etc. at 14 percent with philology at 13 percent. Philosophy, surprisingly, was only 6 percent while arts, liberal and mechanical, "magick," etc. was 3 percent. The remaining subjects were as follows: medicine, surgery, and "chymistry," 2 percent; law, 2 percent; voyages and travels, 1 percent; philosophical history, 1 percent, and miscellaneous, 5 percent.

Logan's library contained many 17th and 16th century classical works such as a 1615 edition of Archimedes' works, the mathematical treatise of Pappus of Alexandria printed in 1660, an Aratus of Soles from 1672, Elzevir's architecture publication of 1649 from Amsterdam, Johann Vossius' De Quatuar Artibus Popularibus published in 1650, and a 1599 edition of astronomy edited by Barthelemy Pitiscus. In one famous episode, Logan was reading a treatise on early astronomy by Johann Fabricius and read that the first printed edition of Greek astronomer Ptolemy's Almagest was printed in Greek in 1538. Logan was certain that it was released in an earlier Latin version, having sold it and his other books in Dublin before he left in 1699. Logan wrote Fabricius and politely explained his conviction. In reply, Fabricius reaffirmed his contention and sent his own 1538 copy as proof. Unconvinced, Logan wrote his agent in London, explaining that he had sold his library to a bookseller who lived on Castle Street and to see if he knew of the book's location. His agent was successful in finding the book and sent to Logan where it was confirmed that it was a Latin edition of the Almagest published in 1515. Such was the strength of Logan's bibliographic mind as professed by Benjamin Franklin.

== Legacy ==
In Philadelphia, the Logan neighbourhood and the landmark Logan Circle are both named in honour of Logan. His 1730 estate Stenton in the Logan neighbourhood has been named a National Historic Landmark and operates as a public museum.

== See also ==
- Walking Purchase

== Sources ==
- Strahan, Edward (1875). A Century After, picturesque glimpses of Philadelphia and Pennsylvania. Philadelphia: Allen, Lane & Scott and J. W. Lauderbach.
- Claus Bernet (2010). "James Logan (statesman)". In Bautz, Traugott (ed.). Biographisch-Bibliographisches Kirchenlexikon (BBKL) (in German). Vol. 31. Nordhausen: Bautz. cols. 790–798. ISBN 978-3-88309-544-8.

Legal offices
Preceded by David Lloyd	Chief Justice, Supreme Court of Pennsylvania; 1731–1739	Succeeded by Jeremiah Langhorne
Political offices
Preceded by William Fishbourn	Mayor of Philadelphia; 1722–1723	Succeeded by Clement Plumsted
