= Nathan Stanbury =

American mayor

Nathan Stanbury (1670? – February 2, 1720/1, Philadelphia) was the mayor of colonial Philadelphia from 1 October 1706 to 7 October 1707.

Stanbury served as Justice of the Peace of Philadelphia County in 1704.

In 1706, Alderman Thomas Story was first elected to the non-paying office of mayor of Philadelphia; when he refused the honor, he was fined twenty pounds. In a second vote, Stanbury was elected to the position, which he accepted.

== Family ==
Stanbury married widow Mary Ewer (née Wills, d. February 25, 1714/5) at Philadelphia on January 31, 1699. They had three children:

- Nathan Stanbury (d. 10 June 1704, Philadelphia).
- Nathan Stanbury (d. 8 June 1712, Philadelphia).
- Mary Stanbury (1705 – 26 October 1778, Philadelphia).
