= John Hughes (Pennsylvania politician) =

Colonial American politician (1711–1772)

John Hughes (1711–1772) was a politician who played a major role in colonial Pennsylvania during the eighteenth century. Hughes was a close ally of Benjamin Franklin and Joseph Galloway, both leading figures in the colony. He was part of the anti-proprietary faction in Philadelphia and supported moves by Franklin to turn Pennsylvania into a crown colony which would have brought it under direct rule of the Crown rather than the Penn family. He held the position of Speaker of the Pennsylvania colonial assembly.

In 1765 when the British government brought in a Stamp Act for its North American colonies, Hughes was recommended by Franklin—who was in London—to be appointed as the official stamp distributor for Pennsylvania, a potentially lucrative office. However, the proposed introduction of the Act triggered violent protests along the Atlantic seaboard. Faced with mob violence, including attacks on the houses of collectors, Hughes was forced to resign his office. That October, Hughes did not run for re-election in the colonial Assembly. The Stamp Act Crisis turned Hughes from a popular politician into an exile from Pennsylvania. He left the colony to take up a post as a Customs Officer—in Portsmouth, New Hampshire, in 1769, and the following year in Charles Town, South Carolina—a position arranged by Benjamin Franklin. He died in Charleston, February 1, 1772.

== Bibliography ==
- Anderson, Fred. Crucible of War: The Seven Years' War and the Fate of Empire in British North America, 1754–1766. Faber and Faber, 2001
- Bowser, Les. The Search for Heinrich Stief: a genealogist on the loose. Halifax, NS: Nimbus Pub., 2001
- Holstein, Anna M. Swedish Holsteins in America, from 1644 to 1892. Comprising many letters and biographical matter relating to John Hughes, the "stamp officer," and friend of Franklin, with papers not before published relating to his brother of revolutionary fame, Colonel Hugh Hughes of New York. Norristown, PA: W. R. Willis, 1892.
