= Duquette (surname) =

Origin
- Region of origin: France; French Canadian

Other names
- Variant forms: Ducquette, Duquette, Duquete, Ducquet, Duquet, Duquais, Duchet, Duchez, Duchey, Duchette, Duchais, Duche

Duquette is a French-origin surname. There are several variants, some more common amongst French Canadians. It is uncommon as a given name.

People with the name or its variants include:

- Charles Duquette (1869–1937), Canadian politician
- Cyrille Duquet (1841–1922), Canadian inventor and goldsmith
- David Duquette (born 1949), American philosophy professor
- Dan Duquette (born 1958), American baseball executive
- Donald N. Duquette, American academic and child advocate
- Elzear Duquette (1910–1988), Canadian walker
- Gérard Duquet (1909–1986), Canadian politician
- Jim Duquette (born 1966), American baseball executive
- Joseph Duquet (1815–1838), notary in Lower Canada
- Léonie Duquet (1916–1977), French nun
- Lon Milo DuQuette (born 1948), American writer, lecturer, and occultist
- Pat Duquette (born 1970), American basketball player and coach
- Steve Duquette (1927–2019), American cartoonist
- Tony Duquette (1914–1999), American designer for stage and film

== See also ==
- Duché, a surname
