= Prayer at the Opening of the First Continental Congress =

1774 public prayer delivered at the First Continental Congress

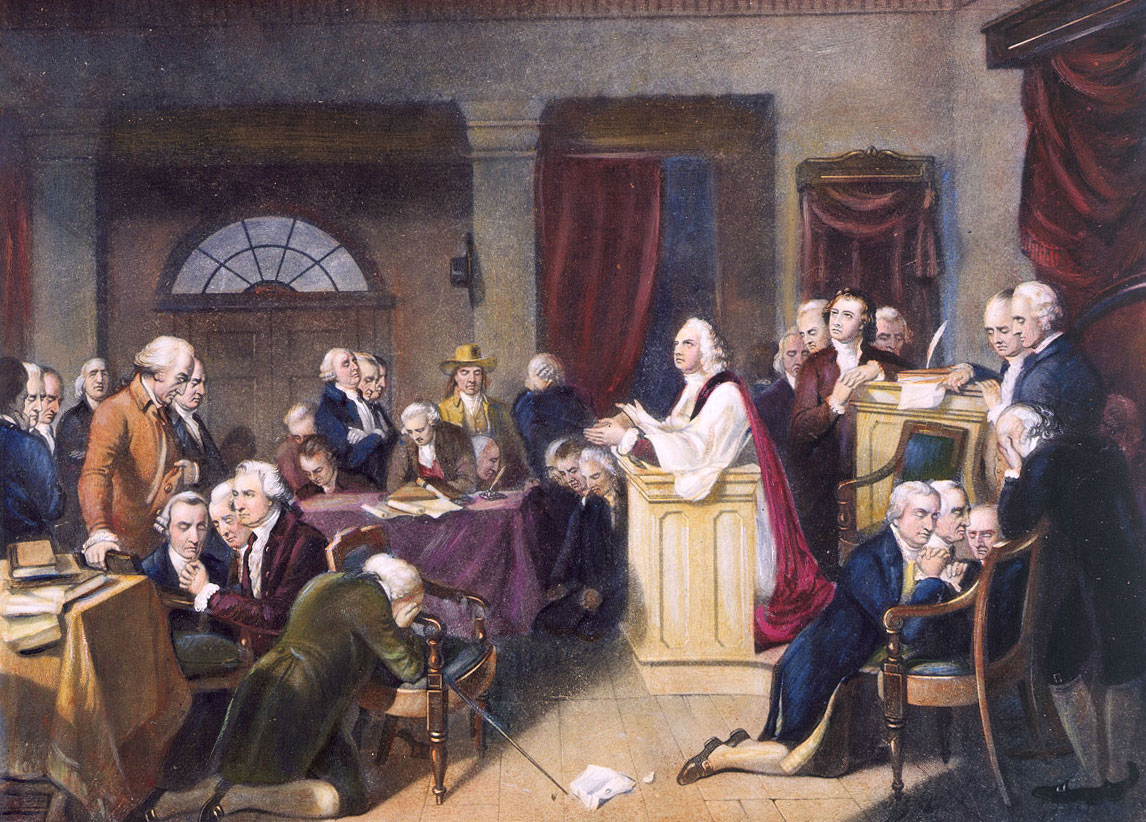
- First Prayer of the Continental Congress, 1774 (19th-century depiction)
- Date: September 7, 1774
- Time: “9 o’clock a.m.”
- Location: Carpenters' Hall, Philadelphia
- Type: Opening public prayer
- Participants: Jacob Duché; Delegates of the First Continental Congress

The Prayer at the Opening of the First Continental Congress was delivered by the Rev. Jacob Duché on September 7, 1774, at Carpenters’ Hall in Philadelphia. After reading Psalm 35, Duché offered an extemporaneous prayer that was immediately recognized as one of the most powerful devotional scenes of the early American Revolution. Contemporary letters describe the entire hall as visibly moved; some delegates wept, others knelt, and nearly all later wrote home about the extraordinary emotional intensity of the moment.

The prayer was rapidly reprinted across the colonies and became one of the earliest and most influential expressions of American civil religion during the Revolutionary era.

== Historical context ==
The First Continental Congress assembled in Philadelphia on September 5, 1774, in response to the Intolerable Acts. Its delegates represented a wide spectrum of colonial religious traditions, including Anglicans, Congregationalists, Presbyterians, Quakers, Lutherans, Baptists, and Reformed Christians. The diversity made even routine questions, such as whether to begin with prayer, matters of careful debate.

=== Debate over denominational differences ===
When the idea of opening Congress with prayer was proposed, several delegates objected on denominational grounds. Some feared that an Anglican prayer would alienate Congregationalist and Presbyterian delegates; others questioned whether a Quaker-influenced colony like Pennsylvania would accept liturgical ceremony at all. According to later accounts, the objections were serious enough that an opening prayer appeared unlikely.

Samuel Adams ultimately shifted the debate. Rising during the discussion, he insisted that he “could hear a prayer from any gentleman of piety and virtue who is a friend to his country,” an argument that reframed the issue as one of unity rather than doctrine. Adams’ intervention reassured delegates across denominational lines.

Charles Thomson, secretary of Congress, later wrote that Adams’ remarks “removed the scruples of many,” and after brief further discussion the delegates unanimously voted to invite Jacob Duché, assistant rector of Christ Church, Philadelphia, a clergyman known for his eloquence and moderation.

== Delivery ==
At 9:00 a.m. on September 7, Duché entered Carpenters' Hall wearing full Anglican clerical robes and carrying the Book of Common Prayer. Delegates rose as he entered; observers later described the hall as unusually silent and expectant. The political gravity of the moment, combined with the unprecedented gathering of twelve colonies, gave the scene a heightened emotional tone.

Duché began by reading Psalm 35, invoking divine justice against persecutors. John Adams wrote that the psalm “thrilled through the whole assembly,” and Charles Thomson observed that it “seemed wonderfully adapted to the circumstances of America.” Many delegates, including Quakers not accustomed to outward expressions of devotion, reportedly stood and followed the reading closely.

When Duché knelt to pray, numerous delegates followed. Thomas Cushing wrote that the prayer “had a surprising effect upon the whole assembly,” while Edward Rutledge described it as “a noble scene of devotion.” Peyton Randolph later commented that Duché spoke with “a fervor suited to the occasion.” Even members of differing theological traditions recorded similar emotional reactions.

Duché then offered an extemporaneous prayer asking for unity, wisdom, and divine favor on the colonial cause. The version preserved by the Office of the Chaplain of the U.S. House of Representatives follows:

O Lord our Heavenly Father, high and mighty King of kings, and Lord of lords, who dost from thy throne behold all the dwellers on earth and reignest with power supreme and uncontrolled over all the Kingdoms, Empires and Governments; look down in mercy, we beseech Thee, on these our American States, who have fled to Thee from the rod of the oppressor and thrown themselves on Thy gracious protection, desiring to be henceforth dependent only on Thee. To Thee have they appealed for the righteousness of their cause; to Thee do they now look up for that countenance and support, which Thou alone canst give. Take them, therefore, Heavenly Father, under Thy nurturing care; give them wisdom in Council and valor in the field; defeat the malicious designs of our cruel adversaries; convince them of the unrighteousness of their Cause and if they persist in their sanguinary purposes, of own unerring justice, sounding in their hearts, constrain them to drop the weapons of war from their unnerved hands in the day of battle!

Be Thou present, O God of wisdom, and direct the councils of this honorable assembly; enable them to settle things on the best and surest foundation. That the scene of blood may be speedily closed; that order, harmony and peace may be effectually restored, and truth and justice, religion and piety, prevail and flourish amongst the people. Preserve the health of their bodies and vigor of their minds; shower down on them and the millions they here represent, such temporal blessings as Thou seest expedient for them in this world and crown them with everlasting glory in the world to come. All this we ask in the name and through the merits of Jesus Christ, Thy Son and our Savior.

Amen.

== Reception and aftermath ==
News of the prayer spread quickly across the colonies. Delegates wrote home describing the moment as deeply unifying and emotionally charged. John Adams told Abigail Adams that the prayer “filled the bosom of every man present,” and Thomas Cushing reported that the scene affected “even those of denominations not accustomed to liturgical devotion.” Richard Henry Lee called the scene “one of the most touching prayers I have ever heard,” and several New England delegates, who were unaccustomed to Anglican ritual, remarked upon Duché's unusual intensity.

South Carolina delegates praised the prayer in letters later printed in Charleston, calling it “patriotic” and “admirable.” Pennsylvania newspapers described the event as “affecting” and “solemn,” and the Pennsylvania Journal editorialized that God had “manifestly smiled upon the counsels of America.”

Within a week the prayer appeared in more than a dozen colonial newspapers, including the Pennsylvania Gazette, Connecticut Courant, New England Chronicle, and Newport Mercury. A Philadelphia broadside titled A Prayer for the Congress circulated widely, and several early pamphlet editions were printed for household devotion. Ministers in New England and the Middle Colonies read the prayer aloud in Sunday services, treating it as a model of patriotic piety.

By late 1774 the prayer had become one of the most frequently reprinted devotional texts of the year, symbolizing intercolonial unity amid religious diversity. The modern U.S. House of Representatives later identified Duché's prayer as the founding precedent for the congressional tradition of opening legislative sessions with public prayer.

== See also ==
- Jacob Duché
- First Continental Congress
- Book of Common Prayer
- Civil religion
- Psalm 35
