= Duché =

Duché is a surname. Notable people with the surname include:

- Jacob Duché Sr. (1708–1788), American colonist, mayor of colonial Philadelphia
- Jacob Duché (1737–1798), American colonist, chaplain to the Continental Congress
- Thomas Spence Duché (1763–1790), American painter

== See also ==
- Duquette (surname)
- Gaspard Duché de Vancy (1756–1788), French artist
- Joseph-François Duché de Vancy (1668–1704), French playwright
