= Judeo-Christian (disambiguation) =

Judeo-Christian is a term grouping Judaism and Christianity. It can also refer to:

- Judeo-Christian ethics, the 20th-century American concept of values shared by the two religions
- Christianity and Judaism, the general intersectionality of Judaism and Christianity
- Messianic Judaism, the modernist Protestant movement that incorporates elements of Jewish traditions into evangelicalism
- Jewish Christian, converts from Judaism to early Christianity
