= Elzéar =

Elzéar or Elzear is a given name. Notable people with the name include:

- Elzéar Bédard (1799–1849), lawyer, member of the Legislative Assembly of Lower Canada
- Joseph-Elzéar Bernier (1852–1934), Canadian mariner who led expeditions into the Canadian Arctic
- Elzéar Auguste Cousin de Dommartin (1768–1799), French general during the French Revolutionary Wars
- Elzéar-Henri Juchereau Duchesnay (1809–1871), seigneur, lawyer and political figure in Canada East
- Elzear Duquette, Canadian long-distance walker who undertook multiple cross-continental solo endurance walks
- Elzéar Genet (1470–1548), French composer of the Renaissance
- Elzéar Gérin, (1843–1887), politician in Quebec, Canada
- Elzéar Goulet (1836–1870), Métis leader in the Red River Colony, which later became the province of Manitoba, Canada
- Bache-Elzéar-Alexandre d'Arbaud de Jouques (1720–1793), French aristocrat and public official
- Olivier Elzéar Mathieu (1853–1929), Canadian Roman Catholic priest, academic, and Archbishop of Regina
- Victurnien-Henri-Elzéar de Rochechouart de Mortemart, French Navy officer in the War of American Independence
- Joseph Louis Elzéar Ortolan (1802–1873), French jurist
- Elzéar Abeille de Perrin (1843–1910), French entomologist
- Elzéar of Sabran (born 1285), Baron of Ansouis, Count of Ariano from southern France
- Elzéar-Alexandre Taschereau (1820–1898), Canadian Cardinal of the Roman Catholic Church
- Gabriel-Elzéar Taschereau (1745–1809), member of the Legislative Assembly and Legislative Council of Lower Canada
- Henri-Elzéar Taschereau, PC (1836–1911), Canadian jurist and the fourth Chief Justice of Canada
- Pierre-Elzéar Taschereau (1805–1845), lawyer and political figure in Quebec
- Elzear Torreggiani D.D., O.S.F.C, (1830–1904), Catholic Bishop of Armidale, New South Wales

== See also ==
- Saint-Elzéar, Chaudière-Appalaches, Quebec, municipality in Quebec, Canada
- Saint-Elzéar, Gaspésie–Îles-de-la-Madeleine, Quebec, municipality in Quebec, Canada
- Saint-Elzéar, Laval, Quebec, district in the centre of Laval, Quebec
- Karst-de-Saint-Elzéar Biodiversity Reserve, a biodiversity reserve in Gaspésie–Îles-de-la-Madeleine, Quebec, Canada
- Saint-Elzéar-de-Témiscouata, municipality in the Bas-Saint-Laurent region of Quebec, Canada
