= Duquette =

Duquette may refer to:

- Duquette (surname), including a list of people with the name
- Duquette, Minnesota, a place in the United States
