= Jacob Duché =

American Anglican clergyman; first chaplain to the Continental Congress

- Engraving after Henry Pelham, c. 1779
- Born: January 31, 1737; Philadelphia, Province of Pennsylvania
- Died: January 3, 1798 (aged 60); Philadelphia, Pennsylvania, U.S.
- Burial place: St. Peter's churchyard
- Education: College of Philadelphia (now University of Pennsylvania
- Spouse: Elizabeth Hopkinson (m. 1759)
- Children: Thomas Spence Duché
- Parent: Jacob Duché Sr. (father)

Ecclesiastical career
- Religion: Anglican
- Church: Christ Church, Philadelphia
- Title: Rector

Jacob Duché (January 31, 1737 – January 3, 1798) was an American Anglican clergyman, author, and religious educator best known for delivering the dramatic opening prayer at the First Continental Congress on September 7, 1774, an event celebrated as a defining moment in early American civil religion. Initially praised as a patriot preacher and appointed the first official chaplain to the Continental Congress in July 1776, Duché later became one of the most controversial religious figures of the American Revolution. In October 1777 he authored a lengthy letter urging George Washington and Congress to abandon the war and seek reconciliation with Great Britain; a document condemned as treasonous and widely reprinted as evidence of Loyalist subversion.

Duché’s life illustrates the profound religious, political, and personal strains placed upon Anglican clergy during the Revolution. Historians debate his shift from patriot to Loyalist, variously interpreting it as a crisis of conscience, a product of Anglican hierarchical identity, a reaction to the British occupation of Philadelphia, or a collapse under wartime pressures. After fleeing to England in late 1777, Duché spent more than a decade preaching, publishing sermons, and associating with Loyalist émigré circles before receiving personal assurances from Washington that he could safely return. He lived quietly in Philadelphia until his death in 1798.

Duché’s opening prayer has been memorialized in sermons, political writings, artistic depictions, and American Revolutionary iconography, while his 1777 letter remains one of the most studied documents of religious dissent during the Revolutionary crisis.

== Biography ==
Duché was born in Philadelphia in 1737, the son of Colonel Jacob Duché, Sr., later mayor of Philadelphia (1761–1762) and grandson of Anthony Duché, a French Huguenot. He was educated at the Philadelphia Academy and then in the first class of the College of Philadelphia (now the University of Pennsylvania), where he also worked as a tutor of Greek and Latin. After graduating as valedictorian in 1757, he studied briefly at Cambridge University before being ordained an Anglican clergyman by the Bishop of London and returning to the colonies.

In 1759 he married Elizabeth Hopkinson, sister of Francis Hopkinson, a signer of the Declaration of Independence. In 1768, he was elected to the American Society.

Duché first came to the attention of the First Continental Congress in September 1774, when he was summoned to Carpenters' Hall to lead the opening prayers. Opening the session on the 7th of that month, he read the 35th Psalm, and then broke into extemporaneous prayer.

O Lord our Heavenly Father, high and mighty King of kings, and Lord of lords, who dost from thy throne behold all the dwellers on earth and reignest with power supreme and uncontrolled over all the Kingdoms, Empires and Governments; look down in mercy, we beseech thee, on these our American States, who have fled to thee from the rod of the oppressor and thrown themselves on Thy gracious protection, desiring to be henceforth dependent only on Thee, to Thee have they appealed for the righteousness of their cause; to Thee do they now look up for that countenance and support, which Thou alone canst give; take them, therefore, Heavenly Father, under Thy nurturing care; give them wisdom in Council and valor in the field; defeat the malicious designs of our cruel adversaries; convince them of the unrighteousness of their Cause and if they persist in their sanguinary purposes, of own unerring justice, sounding in their hearts, constrain them to drop the weapons of war from their unnerved bands in the day of battle!

Be Thou present, O God of wisdom, and direct the councils of this honorable assembly; enable them to settle things on the best and surest foundation. That the scene of blood may be speedily closed; that order, harmony and peace may be effectually restored, and truth and justice, religion and piety, prevail and flourish amongst the people. Preserve the health of their bodies and vigor of their minds; shower down on them and the millions they here represent, such temporal blessings as Thou seest expedient for them in this world and crown them with everlasting glory in the world to come. All this we ask in the name and through the merits of Jesus Christ, Thy Son and our Savior. Amen.

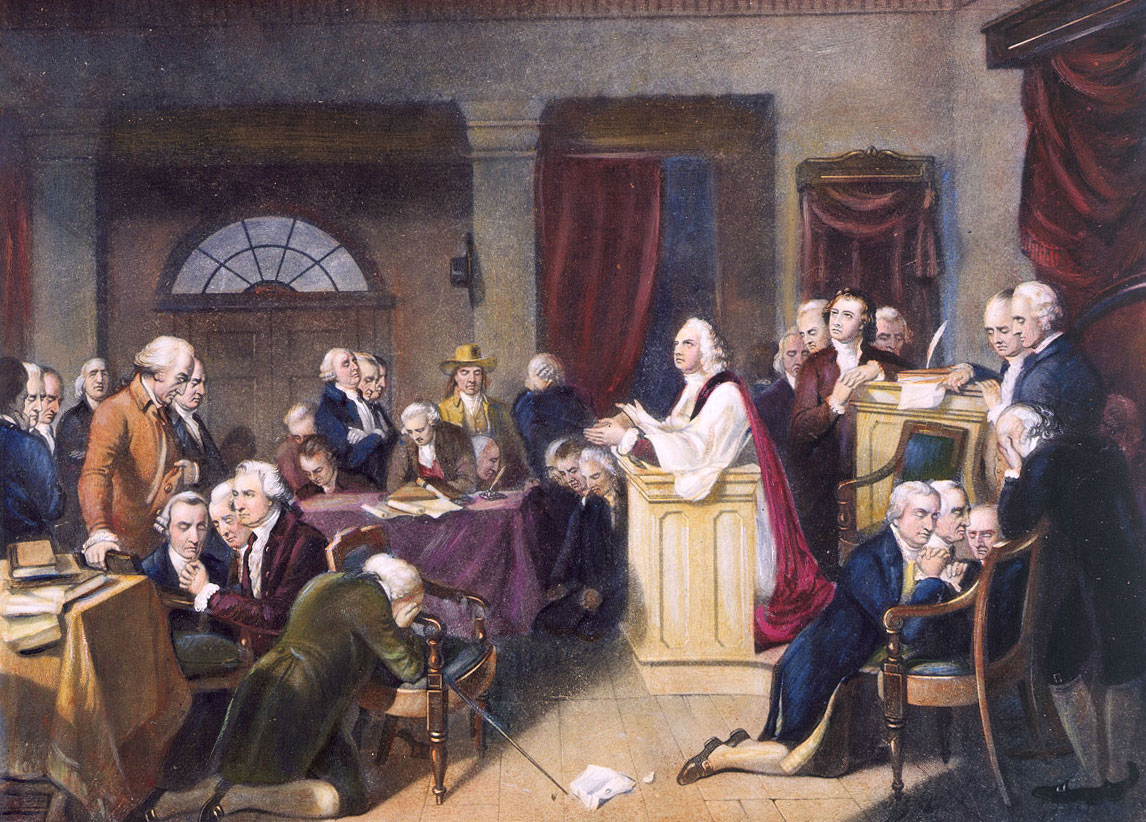
Duché delivering the First Prayer in Congress

The prayer had a profound effect on the delegates, as recounted by John Adams to his wife.

On July 4, 1776, when the United States Declaration of Independence was ratified, Duché, meeting with the church's vestry, passed a resolution stating that the name of King George III of Great Britain was no longer to be read in the prayers of the church. Duché complied, crossing out said prayers from his Book of Common Prayer, committing an act of treason against England, an extraordinary and dangerous act for a clergyman who had taken an oath of loyalty to the King. On July 9, Congress elected him its first official chaplain.

When the British occupied Philadelphia in September 1777, Duché was arrested by General William Howe and detained, underlining the seriousness of his actions. He was later released, and emerged as a Loyalist and propagandist for the British, at which time he wrote a famous letter to General George Washington, camped near Valley Forge, Pennsylvania, in which he begged him to lay down arms and negotiate for peace with the British. Suddenly, Duché went from hero of the Revolutionary cause to outcast in the new United States. He was convicted of high treason to the State of Pennsylvania, and his estate was confiscated. In consequence, Duché fled to England, where he was appointed chaplain to the Lambeth orphan asylum, and soon made a reputation as an eloquent preacher. He was not able to return to America until 1792, after he had suffered a stroke.

On October 1, 1777, Congress appointed joint chaplains, William White, Duché's successor at Christ Church, and George Duffield, pastor of the Third Presbyterian Church of Philadelphia.

Duché died in 1798 in Philadelphia, where he is buried in St. Peter's churchyard. His daughter, Elizabeth Sophia Duché (born on September 18, 1774, Philadelphia; died on December 11, 1808, Montréal), married Captain John Henry in 1799. Henry was an Army officer and political adventurer who was indirectly instrumental in the declaration of war on Great Britain by the United States in 1812. His son was the painter, Thomas Spence Duché (September 15, 1763 - March 31, 1790).

== Legacy ==
Stained glass window in Christ Church in Philadelphia, of Jacob Duché delivering first prayer before Congress

== See also ==
- List of clergy in the American Revolution

== Sources ==
- Davis, Burke (1975). George Washington and the American Revolution. Random House, New York. ISBN 9780394463889.
- Johnson, William J (1919). George Washington The Christian. Abington Press, New York, Cincinnati.
- Hastings, George.E. (1932). Malone, Dumas (ed.). Dictionary of American biography. Vol. V.
  New York: Charles Scribner's Sons.
- Neill, Edward Duffield (1878). "Rev. Jacob Duché, the First Chaplain of Congress". The Pennsylvania Magazine of History and Biography. 2 (1): 58–73. JSTOR 20084327.
