= Henry Harrison (Philadelphia mayor) =

American merchant and Mayor of Philadelphia

Mayor of Philadelphia
- In office October 5, 1762 – October 4, 1763
- Preceded by: Jacob Duché, Sr.
- Succeeded by: Thomas Willing

Personal details
- Born: c. 1712 Lancashire, England
- Died: January 3, 1766 (aged 52–53) Philadelphia, Province of Pennsylvania, British America
- Spouse: Mary Aspden (m. 1748)
- Children: 4

Henry Harrison (c. 1712 – January 3, 1766) was a merchant and politician, and the mayor of Philadelphia, Pennsylvania, 1762–1763.

== Early life ==
Harrison was born in Lancashire, England in c. 1712.

In his early life, he was captain of the ship The Snow Squirrel.

== Career ==
After moving to the Province of Pennsylvania in what was then British America, Harrison served as an alderman. He was also a member and vestryman of Christ Church. He became wealthy as a dry-goods merchant.

On October 5, 1762, he was appointed mayor of Philadelphia, serving until October 4, 1763.

He also served as manager of the Public Hospital and was a local real estate developer.

== Personal life ==
On April 13, 1748, Harrison married Mary Aspden (1718–1803), formerly of Lancashire and the daughter of Mathew Aspen. In 1760, he built a home in Philadelphia on Coombes Alley (today known as Cuthbert Street). Together, they were the parents of five children:

- Mary Harrison (1750–1797), who married the Right Reverend William White, D.D., first consecrated Bishop of the Episcopal Church, Diocese of Philadelphia, in 1773.
- Anne Harrison (1757–1780), who married William Paca (1740–1799), signer of the Declaration of Independence and later governor of Maryland, on February 28, 1777.
- Matthias Harrison (1759–1817), who married Rebecca Mifflin, daughter of Turrut Francis.
- George Harrison (1762–1845) who married Sophia Francis in 1792.
- Joseph Harrison

Harrison died on January 3, 1766, in Philadelphia, where he was buried in Christ Church Burial Ground. His stone is inscribed "Alderman and sometime Mayor of Philadelphia, A Christian and useful Citizen. His desolate Widow, sadly bewailing her irretrievable loss, and striving to alleviate her grief with the memory of his worth, Erected this Stone." His estate was estimated to be worth over £15,086.12.0 which included 157 troy ounces of plate valued at £78.10 (roughly $2,000,000 in 2017 figures).

Political offices
Preceded by Jacob Duché, Sr.	Mayor of Philadelphia; 1762–1763	Succeeded by Thomas Willing
