= Judeo-Christian ethics =

Concept of common shared values between Christians and Jews

Judeo-Christian ethics (or Judaeo-Christian values) is a system of values common to Jews and Christians. It was first described in print in 1941 by the English writer George Orwell. The idea that Judaeo-Christian ethics underpin American politics, American law, and American morals has been part of the "American civil religion" since then. While the phrase has more recently been associated with American conservatism, the concept—though not always the exact phrase—has frequently featured in the rhetoric of leaders across the political spectrum, including that of Franklin D. Roosevelt and Lyndon B. Johnson.

== Ethical value system ==
The current American use of "Judeo-Christian" — to refer to a value system common to Jews and Christians — first appeared in print on 11 July 1939 in a book review by the English writer George Orwell, with the phrase "… incapable of acting meanly, a thing that carries no weight the Judaeo-Christian scheme of morals". Orwell repeated the term in his 1941 essay: "It was the idea of human equality—the "Jewish" or "Judeo-Christian" idea of equality—that Hitler came into the world to destroy", reflecting the Nazis' Positive Christianity concept to purge faith of its "Jewish" elements.

Orwell's usage of the term followed at least a decade of efforts by Christian and Jewish leaders, through such groups as the U.S. National Conference of Christians and Jews (founded in 1927), to emphasize common ground. The term continued to gain currency in the 1940s. In part, it was a way of countering antisemitism, with the idea that the foundation of morals and law in the United States was a shared one between Jews and Christians.

Orwell was not the first to publicly speak about the moral commonality of Christian and Jewish traditions. On May 19, 1939, Albert Einstein, in a speech at Princeton Theological Seminary, explaining the importance of moral principles for modern science, emphasized: "The highest principles for our aspirations and judgments are given to us in the Jewish-Christian religious tradition."

And back in 1884, three years after a large-scale wave of anti-Jewish pogroms in Russia, Vladimir Solovyov (Soloviev), a prominent Russian philosopher and Christian writer, wrote in his essay "The Jews and the Christian Question":

"Our religion begins with a personal relationship between God and man in the ancient covenant of Abraham and Moses, and is confirmed in the closest personal unity of God and man in the New Testament of Jesus Christ, in which both natures exist inseparably, but unmerged as well. These two covenants are not two different religions, but only two stages of one and the same Divine-human religion, or speaking in the language of the German school, two moments of one and the same God-human process. This single and true Divine-human Judeo-Christian religion proceeds by a direct and magisterial path amid the two extreme errors of paganism, in which first man is absorbed by Divinity (in India), and then Divinity itself is transformed into a shadow of man (in Greece and Rome)."

=== Franklin D. Roosevelt ===
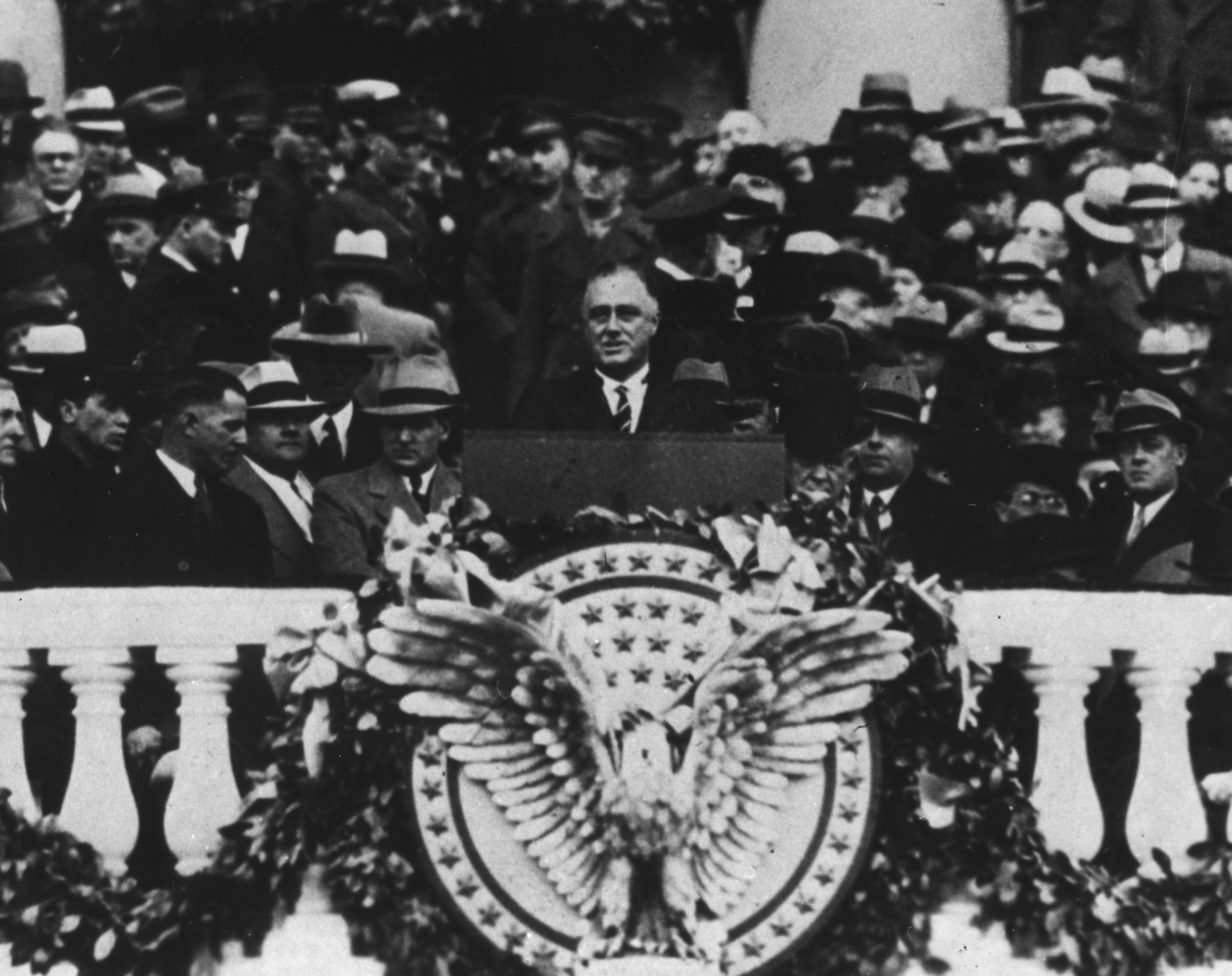
The first inaugural address of Franklin D. Roosevelt in 1933

The first inaugural address of Franklin D. Roosevelt (FDR), in 1933, the famous speech in which FDR declared that "the only thing we have to fear is fear itself", had numerous religious references, which was widely commented upon at the time. Although it did not use the term "Judeo-Christian", it has come to be seen by scholars as in tune with the emerging view of a Judeo-Christian tradition. Historian Mary Stuckey emphasizes "Roosevelt's use of the shared values grounded in the Judeo-Christian tradition" as a way to unify the American nation, and justify his own role as its chief policymaker.

In the speech, FDR criticized the bankers and promised a reform in an echo of the gospels: "The money changers have fled from their high seats in the temple of our civilization. We may now restore that temple to the ancient truths. The measure of the restoration lies in the extent to which we apply social values more noble than mere monetary profit." Houck and Nocasian, examining the flood of responses to the First Inaugural, and commenting on this passage, argue:

The nation's overwhelmingly Judeo-Christian response to the address thus had both textual and extratextual warrants. For those inclined to see the Divine Hand of Providence at work, Roosevelt's miraculous escape [from assassination] in Miami was a sign—perhaps The Sign—that God had sent another Washington or Lincoln at the appointed hour. ... Many others could not resist the subject position that Roosevelt ... had cultivated throughout the address—that of savior. After all, it was Christ who had expelled the moneychangers from the Temple. ... [Many listeners saw] a composite sign that their new president had a godly mandate to lead.

Gary Scott Smith stresses that Roosevelt believed his welfare programs were "wholly in accord with the social teachings of Christianity". He saw the achievement of social justice through government action as morally superior to the old laissez-faire approach. He proclaimed, "The thing we are seeking is justice," as guided by the precept of "Do unto your neighbor as you would be done by." Roosevelt saw the moral issue as religiosity versus anti-religion. According to Smith, "He pleaded with Protestants, Catholics, and Jews to transcend their sectarian creeds and 'unite in good works' whenever they could 'find common cause.'"

Atalia Omer and Jason A. Springs point to Roosevelt's 1939 State of the Union Address, which called upon Americans to "defend, not their homes alone, but the tenets of faith and humanity on with which their churches, their governments and their very civilization are founded". They state that, "This familiar rhetoric invoked a conception of the sanctity of the United States' Judeo-Christian values as a basis for war."

Timothy Wyatt notes that in the coming of World War II Roosevelt's isolationist opponents said he was calling for a "holy war". Wyatt says:

Often in his Fireside Chats or speeches to the houses of Congress, FDR argued for the entrance of America into the war by using both blatant and subtle religious rhetoric. Roosevelt portrayed the conflict in the light of good versus evil, the religious against the irreligious. In doing so, he pitted the Christian ideals of democracy against the atheism of National Socialism.

=== Lyndon B. Johnson ===
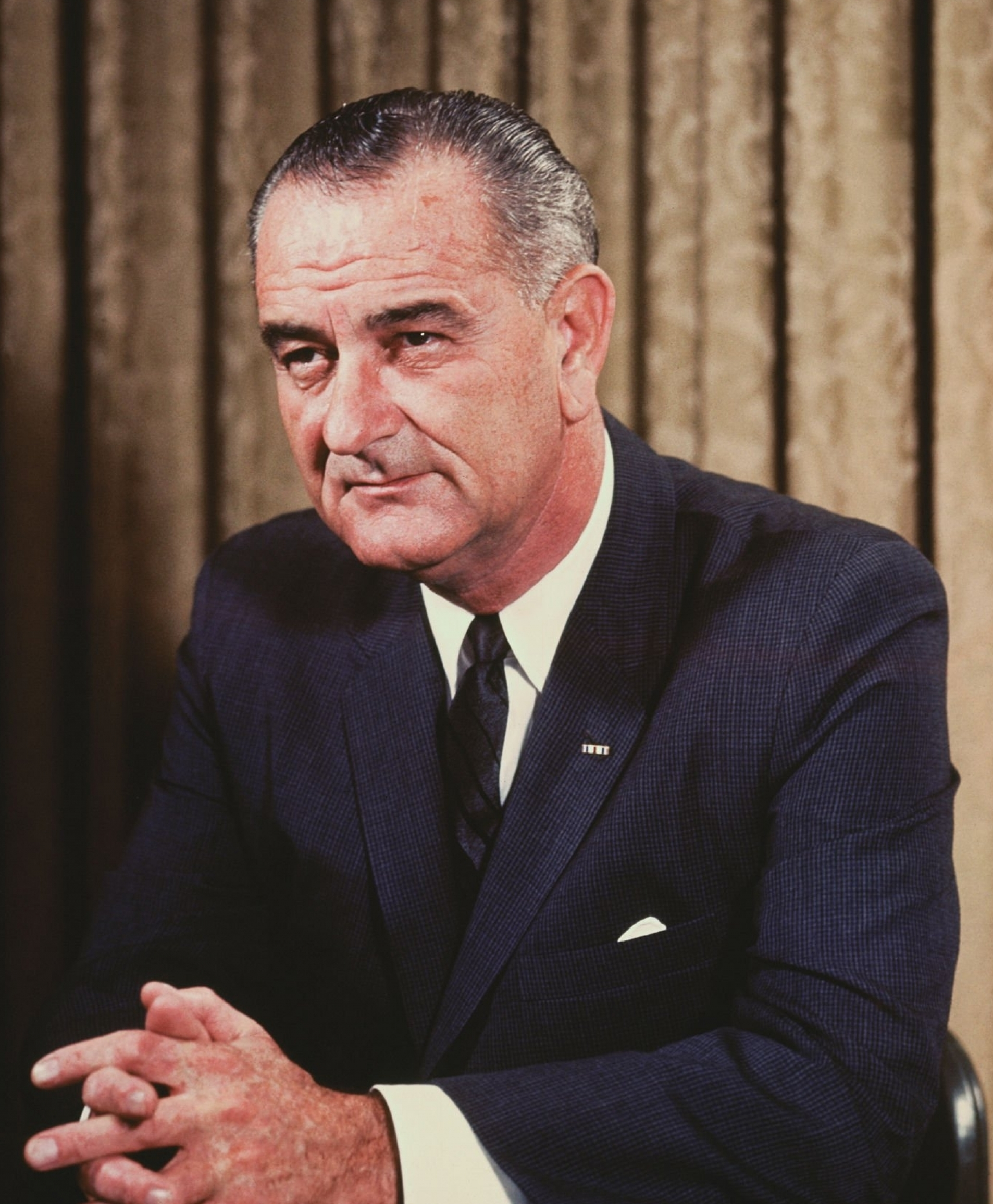
Lyndon B. Johnson in June 1964

Biographer Randall B. Woods has argued that President Lyndon B. Johnson effectively used appeals to the Judeo-Christian ethical tradition to garner support for the civil rights law of 1965. Woods writes that Johnson undermined the Southern Caucus against the bill:

LBJ wrapped white America in a moral straight jacket. How could individuals who fervently, continuously, and overwhelmingly identified themselves with a merciful and just God continue to condone racial discrimination, police brutality, and segregation? Where in the Judeo-Christian ethic was there justification for killing young girls in a church in Alabama, denying an equal education to black children, barring fathers and mothers from competing for jobs that would feed and clothe their families? Was Jim Crow to be America's response to "Godless Communism"?

Woods went on to assess the role of Judeo-Christian ethics among the nation's political elite:

Johnson's decision to define civil rights as a moral issue, and to wield the nation's self-professed Judeo-Christian ethic as a sword in its behalf, constituted something of a watershed in twentieth-century political history. All presidents were fond of invoking the deity, and some conservatives like Dwight Eisenhower had flirted with employing Judeo-Christian teachings to justify their actions, but modern-day liberals, both politicians and the intellectuals who challenged and nourished them, had shunned spiritual witness. Most liberal intellectuals were secular humanists. Academics in particular had historically been deeply distrustful of organized religion, which they identified with small-mindedness, bigotry, and anti-intellectualism. Like his role model, FDR, Johnson equated liberal values with religious values, insisting freedom and social justice served the ends of both god and man. And he was not loath to say so.

Woods notes that Johnson's religiosity ran deep: "At 15 he joined the Disciples of Christ, or Christian, church and would forever believe that it was the duty of the rich to care for the poor, the strong to assist the weak, and the educated to speak for the inarticulate."

== History ==
=== 1930s–1940s ===
Promoting the concept of the United States as a Judeo-Christian nation first became a political program in the 1940s, in response to the growth of anti-Semitism in America. The rise of Nazi anti-semitism in the 1930s led concerned Protestants, Catholics, and Jews to take steps to increase understanding and tolerance.

In this effort, precursors of the National Conference of Christians and Jews created teams consisting of a priest, a rabbi, and a minister, to run programs across the country, and fashion a more pluralistic America, no longer defined as a Christian land, but "one nurtured by three ennobling traditions: Protestantism, Catholicism and Judaism. ... The phrase 'Judeo-Christian' entered the contemporary lexicon as the standard liberal term for the idea that Western values rest on a religious consensus that included Jews."

In the 1930s, "In the face of worldwide antisemitic efforts to stigmatize and destroy Judaism, influential Christians and Jews in America labored to uphold it, pushing Judaism from the margins of American religious life towards its very center." During World War II, Jewish chaplains worked with Catholic priests and Protestant ministers to promote goodwill, addressing servicemen who, "in many cases had never seen, much less heard a Rabbi speak before". At funerals for the unknown soldier, rabbis stood alongside the other chaplains and recited prayers in Hebrew. In a much publicized wartime tragedy, the sinking of the Dorchester, the ship's multi-faith chaplains gave up their lifebelts to evacuating seamen and stood together "arm in arm in prayer" as the ship went down. A 1948 postage stamp commemorated their heroism with the words: "interfaith in action".

=== 1950s–1970s ===
In December 1952, then-President-elect Dwight Eisenhower, speaking extemporaneously a month before his inauguration, said, in what may be the first direct public reference by a U.S. president to the Judeo-Christian concept:

[The Founding Fathers said] 'we hold that all men are endowed by their Creator ... ' In other words, our form of government has no sense unless it is founded in a deeply felt religious faith, and I don't care what it is. With us of course it is the Judeo-Christian concept, but it must be a religion with all men created equal.

By the 1950s, many early modern conservatives emphasized the Judeo-Christian roots of their values. In 1958, economist Elgin Groseclose claimed that it was ideas "drawn from Judeo-Christian Scriptures that have made possible the economic strength and industrial power of this country".

Senator Barry Goldwater noted that conservatives "believed the communist projection of man as a producing, consuming animal to be used and discarded was antithetical to all the Judeo-Christian understandings which are the foundations upon which the Republic stands".

Belief in the superiority of Western Judeo-Christian traditions led conservatives to downplay the aspirations of the Third World to free themselves from colonial rule.

The emergence of the "Christian right" as a political force and part of the conservative coalition dates from the 1970s. According to Cambridge University historian Andrew Preston, the emergence of "conservative ecumenism" bringing together Catholics, Mormons, and conservative Protestants into the religious right coalition, was facilitated "by the rise of a Judeo-Christian ethic". These groups "began to mobilize together on cultural-political issues such as abortion and the proposed Equal Rights Amendment for women". As Wilcox and Robinson conclude:

The Christian Right is an attempt to restore Judeo-Christian values to a country that is in deep moral decline. ... [They] believe that society suffers from the lack of a firm basis of Judeo-Christian values and they seek to write laws that embody those values.

=== 1980s–1990s ===
By the 1980s and 1990s, favorable references to "Judeo-Christian values" were common, and the term was used by conservative Christians.

President Ronald Reagan frequently emphasized Judeo-Christian values as necessary ingredients in the fight against Communism. He argued that the Bible contains "all the answers to the problems that face us". Reagan disapproved of the growth of secularism and emphasized the need to take the idea of sin seriously. Tom Freiling, a Christian publisher and head of a conservative PAC, stated in his 2003 book, Reagan's God and Country, that "Reagan's core religious beliefs were always steeped in traditional Judeo-Christian heritage." Religion—and the Judeo-Christian concept—was a major theme in Reagan's rhetoric by 1980.

President Bill Clinton during his 1992 presidential campaign, likewise emphasized the role of religion in society, and in his personal life, having made references to the Judeo-Christian tradition.

The term became especially significant in American politics, and, promoting "Judeo-Christian values" in the culture wars, usage surged in the 1990s.

=== 2000s–present ===
According to Hartmann et al., usage shifted between 2001 and 2005, with the mainstream media using the term less, in order to characterize America as multicultural. The study finds the term is now most likely to be used by liberals in connection with discussions of Muslim and Islamic inclusion in America, and renewed debate about the separation of church and state.

The 2012 book Kosher Jesus by Orthodox rabbi Shmuley Boteach concludes with the statement that "the hyphen between Jewish and Christian values is Jesus himself."

== In U.S. law ==
In the case of Marsh v. Chambers, 463 U.S. 783 (1983), the Supreme Court of the United States held that a state legislature could constitutionally have a paid chaplain to conduct legislative prayers "in the Judeo-Christian tradition". In Simpson v. Chesterfield County Board of Supervisors, the Fourth Circuit Court of Appeals held that the Supreme Court's holding in the Marsh case meant that the "Chesterfield County could constitutionally exclude Cynthia Simpson, a Wiccan priestess, from leading its legislative prayers, because her faith was not 'in the Judeo-Christian tradition.'" Chesterfield County's board included Jewish, Christian, and Muslim clergy in its invited list.

== Responses ==
Some theologians warn against the uncritical use of "Judeo-Christian" entirely, arguing that it can license mischief, such as opposition to secular humanism with scant regard to modern Jewish, Catholic, or Christian traditions, including the liberal strains of different faiths, such as Reform Judaism and liberal Protestant Christianity.

Two notable books addressed the relations between contemporary Judaism and Christianity. Abba Hillel Silver's Where Judaism Differs and Leo Baeck's Judaism and Christianity were both motivated by an impulse to clarify Judaism's distinctiveness "in a world where the term Judeo-Christian had obscured critical differences between the two faiths".

Reacting against the blurring of theological distinctions, Rabbi Eliezer Berkovits wrote that "Judaism is Judaism because it rejects Christianity, and Christianity is Christianity because it rejects Judaism."

Theologian and author Arthur A. Cohen, in The Myth of the Judeo-Christian Tradition, questioned the theological validity of the Judeo-Christian concept and suggested that it was essentially an invention of American politics, while Jacob Neusner, in Jews and Christians: The Myth of a Common Tradition, writes, "The two faiths stand for different people talking about different things to different people."

Law professor Stephen M. Feldman, looking at the period before 1950, chiefly in Europe, sees the concept of a Judeo-Christian tradition as supersessionism, which he characterizes as "dangerous Christian dogma (at least from a Jewish perspective)", and as a "myth" which "insidiously obscures the real and significant differences between Judaism and Christianity".

== See also ==
- Abraham Accords
- Abrahamic religions
- American civil religion
- Christian ethics
- Jewish ethics
- Ten Commandments
- Code of Hammurabi
