= David Duquette =

Professor of philosophy

- Born: May 22, 1949 (age 77)

Academic background
- Education: University of Kansas (PhD)
- Thesis: Idealism and Materialism: Hegel and Marx on History, Society, and the State (1985)
- Doctoral advisor: Rex Martin

Academic work
- Era: Contemporary philosophy
- Region: Western philosophy
- School or tradition: German Idealism, Marxism
- Institutions: St. Norbert College

David Albert Duquette (born May 22, 1949) is a former professor of philosophy at St. Norbert College.

== Life and works ==
David received his BA from the University of New Hampshire in 1971 and his master of science from Rensselaer Polytechnic Institute in 1976 and in 1981 he received his PhD from the University of Kansas.

=== Selected publications ===
==== Editorials ====
- Hegel's History of Philosophy: New Interpretations. State University of New York Press. 2003. ISBN 978-0-7914-5544-9.

==== Articles ====
- Duquette, David A. (1981). "The Role of consciousness in marx's theory of history". Auslegung: A Journal of Philosophy. 8 (3): 239–259. doi:10.17161/AJP.1808.9010. ISSN 0733-4311.
- Duquette, David A. (1990). "Kant, Hegel and the Possibility of a Speculative Logic". Proceedings of the Hegel Society of America. 10: 1–16. doi:10.5840/hsaproceedings1990113. ISSN 2472-4637.
- Duquette, David A. (1990). "Civil and Political Freedom in Hegel". Southwest Philosophy Review. 6 (1): 37–44. doi:10.5840/swphilreview1990614. ISSN 0897-2346.
