= And I don't care what it is =

Phrase attributed to U.S. President Dwight Eisenhower

"And I don't care what it is" is a phrase attributed to U.S. President Dwight Eisenhower, and often misquoted. For example, one encyclopedia says: "Eisenhower once remarked that 'America makes no sense without a deeply held faith in God—and I don't care what it is.'" Some commentators, such as Will Herberg, argued that Eisenhower favored a generic, watered-down religion, or ridiculed Eisenhower's banality. Speaking extemporaneously on December 22, 1952, a month before his inauguration, Eisenhower actually said:

And this is how they [the Founding Fathers in 1776] explained those: "we hold that all men are endowed by their Creator..." not by the accident of their birth, not by the color of their skins or by anything else, but "all men are endowed by their Creator". In other words, our form of government has no sense unless it is founded in a deeply felt religious faith, and I don't care what it is. Of course, it is the Judeo-Christian concept, but it must be a religion with all men being created equal. (Note: Henry gives the slight variations found in three reports of the speech.)

In a 1981 article regarding the quote, Swarthmore College professor Patrick Henry concluded that the line meant that Eisenhower included other religious possibilities, such as a Buddhist democracy.

Eisenhower at the time was not a church member. Born into a family of Pennsylvania Dutch Mennonites, Eisenhower's decision to pursue a military and then a political career put him at odds with the Mennonites' pacifistic traditions. He became a Presbyterian in 1953, after his first election, and sponsored prayers at cabinet sessions and held prayer breakfasts. When the local minister boasted that Eisenhower was joining his church, the president exploded to his press secretary, "You go and tell that goddamn minister that if he gives out one more story about my religious faith I will not join his goddamn church!"

== See also ==
- American civil religion
