= Jacob Duché Sr. =

American mayor

Colonel Jacob Duché (1708–1788) was a mayor of Philadelphia in the colonial province of Pennsylvania.

Duché was born in Philadelphia, the son of Anthony Duché (c. 1682-1762), a potter from a Huguenot family who had emigrated to England. Anthony had come with his wife to America in the same ship as William Penn in about 1700. Jacob was appointed a colonel of the militia. He served as mayor of Philadelphia from 1761 to 1762. He became a member of the American Philosophical Society through his election in 1768.

He was for many years a vestryman of Christ Church; when the congregation grew too large to be accommodated there, he headed the committee that oversaw the erection of its daughter church, St. Peter's.

== Family ==
Duché married Mary Spence (d. June 5, 1747) on January 13, 1733–34. He later married a widow Bradley, née Esther Duffield. He was the father of Jacob Duché, chaplain to Continental Congress. He died in Lambeth, England, in 1788.

Preceded by Benjamin Shoemaker	Mayor of Philadelphia; 1761–1762	Succeeded by Henry Harrison
