= Cyrille Duquet =

Canadian politician

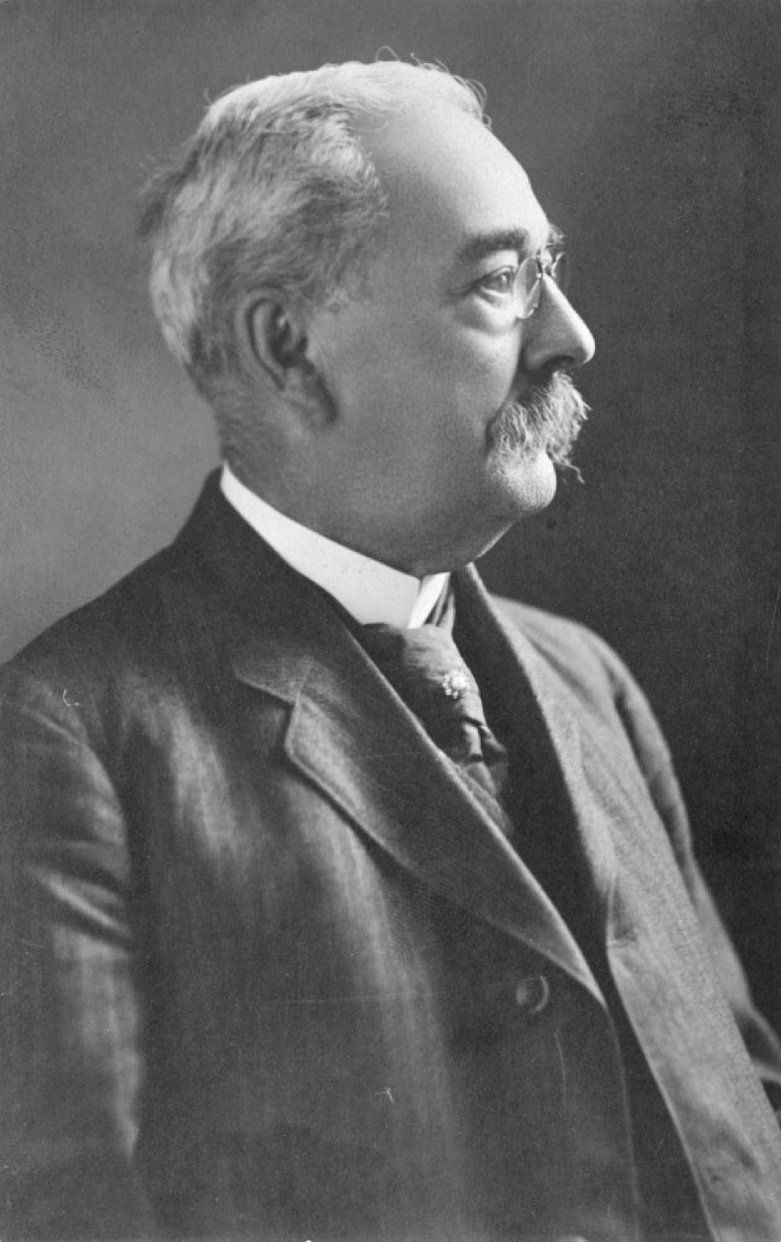
- Born: 31 March 1841; Quebec City
- Died: 1 December 1922 (aged 81); Quebec City
- Occupation: Inventor, politician, flautist, clockmaker, jeweler, goldsmith, collector, scientist, co-collector
- Parent(s): Joseph Duquet

Cyrille Duquet (31 March 1841—1 December 1922) was a Canadian goldsmith, flutist, and inventor in Quebec. Originally working in the field of clocks and watches, he was also a passionate jewelry collector.

On 1 February 1878, Duquet was granted a Canadian patent for a telephone receiver, that was used in some early types of handsets. This patent was for a new transmitter based on a cluster of permanent magnets that improved signal clarity, and a new mouthpiece design. Later, Duquet worked on combining transmitter and receiver in one unit, arranged both on each end of a board. The first telephone installed in Montreal was one Duquet designed, and he installed other phones and phone lines in the area.

At about the same time as Alexander Graham Bell, Duquet developed a telephone connecting his home and shop. Bell's father, Melville Bell, responsible for the Canadian interests of Alexander Graham Bell, who had recently moved to Boston, offered to sell Duquet rights to the telephone in Canada for $20,000. Unable to raise this colossal sum, Duquet abandoned all interests to the Canadian Telephone Company in 1882.

Fleetford Charles Sise, vice-president of the Canadian Telephone Company, complained that Cyrille Duquet had stolen Bell's design. Mr. Duquet was sued for $5000, but got away with damages of about $10; he sold his invention for $2,100 and a promise to cease working in the field of telephony. However, Duquet is still recognized as the designer of the telephone receiver. A photo of his phone is available in the collections of Libraries and Archives Canada and the original phone is currently stored at Bell Canada. An exact replica of the apparatus manufactured and marketed by Cyrille Duquet in 1878 was made by Bell Canada as a gift to Duquet's granddaughter.

In 1883 Duquet made the black rod, a symbol of authority, today preserved at the National Assembly in Quebec City.

The main clock of the National Assembly of Quebec bears his signature, as does the clock of Saint-Jean-Baptiste library. A government building located on Charest Boulevard in Quebec City was named in his honor, and a Quebec street bears his name.

The flutist Cyrille Duquet was a member of the Haydn Septet, a virtuoso ensemble, some of whom joined the Société symphonique de Québec (now Quebec Symphony Orchestra) in 1903.

Duquet was a municipal councilor in Quebec from 1883 to 1890 and 1900 to 1908. He died in Quebec, on 1 December 1922 at the age of 81 years. He was buried in Notre-Dame-de-Belmont.

== Bibliography ==
- "Cyrille Duquet". Dictionary of Canadian Biography (online ed.). University of Toronto Press. 1979–2016.
- Rens, Jean-Guy; Roth, Käthe (2001). The Invisible Empire: A History of the Telecommunications Industry in Canada. McGill-Queen's Press. pp. 58–60. ISBN 978-0-7735-2052-3.
- "Patent no. 8371. Filing year 1878. "Improvements on Telephones," Cyrille Duquet". www.collectionscanada.gc.ca. Libraries and Archives Canada. 11 May 2006.
- "Cyrille Duquet, Inventeur". vitrine-technologique.gouv.qc.ca. Gouvernement du Québec, Centre de services partagés. 2003. Archived from the original on 4 November 2010.
- "Duquette phone replica (photo)". vitrine-technologique.gouv.qc.ca. Gouvernement du Québec, Centre de services partagés. 2003. Archived from the original on 27 December 2006. "Replica (wood, metal and fabric) made by Bell Canada who, on May 4, 1979, donated it to Denise Lamonde of Sainte-Foy, whose grandfather was Cyrille Duquet."
- LeBel, Alyne (1989). "Le magicien de la rue Saint-Jean: L'inventeur Cyrille Duquet". Cap-aux-Diamants: La revue d'histoire du Québec. Figures de proue d'hier et d'aujourd'hui (in French). 4 (4, Winter 1989). Les Éditions Cap-aux-Diamants inc.: 45–48. ISSN 0829-7983.
- "Hommage à Cyrille Duquet". Le Soleil de Québec. page 10. 23 May 1979.
- "Patent 8371 Summary, IMPROVEMENTS ON TELEPHONES". Canadian Intellectual Property Office. 1 February 1878.
- Bell Canada fonds. (23 April 2018). "Telephone invented by M. Cyrille Duquet in 1878". Credit: Bell Canada / Library and Archives Canada / PA-095417.
