= Steve Duquette =

American comic book artist (1927–2019)

- Born: May 13, 1927 United States
- Died: October 26, 2019 (aged 92)
- Areas: Gag Cartoons, Caricaturist
- Awards: NCS Commercial Illustration Award (1990)

Steve Duquette (May 13, 1927 – October 26, 2019) was an American cartoonist who has worked for multiple New York Ad Agencies and Art Studios. His gag cartoons appeared in many magazines during the 1950s and 1960s. Later, Duquette concentrated on working as a freelance caricaturist. He was a longtime member of the National Cartoonists Society and served as Membership Chair in the 1990s. He was also an active member of the Berndt Toast Gang, the Long Island Chapter of the NCS. He died on October 26, 2019.

== Information ==
He received the National Cartoonist Society Commercial Illustration Award in 1990.
