= Thomas Spence Duché =

Thomas Spence Duché (September 15, 1763 – March 31, 1790) was an American painter who studied under Benjamin West after his family moved from Philadelphia to London during the American Revolution.

== Biography ==
Duché was a student at the Academy of Philadelphia as a child. His father, the Reverend Jacob Duché (1737-1798), was the first chaplain to the Continental Congress, who later allied with the British and fled to England in December 1777. The family reunited in England in 1780. Duché was also the maternal grandson of Thomas Hopkinson (1709-1751) and the nephew of Judge Francis Hopkinson (1737-1791).

In London, Duché trained in Benjamin West's studio, alongside John Trumbull and Gilbert Stuart, among others. He worked primarily as a portrait painter until his early death from tuberculosis in 1790.
