= Donald N. Duquette =

American academic and child advocate

- Occupations: Child advocate, clinical law professor, author, and academic
- Awards: Ernie Moore Justice for Children Award, Governor’s Task Force (Michigan) on Child Abuse and Neglect; Lifetime Achievement Award, National Association of Counsel for Children

Academic background
- Education: B.A. in Social Science; Juris Doctor
- Alma mater: Michigan State University; University of Michigan Law School

Academic work
- Institutions: University of Michigan Law School

Donald N. Duquette is an American child advocate, clinical law professor, author, and academic. He is a Clinical Professor of Law Emeritus and the Founding Director Emeritus of the Child Advocacy Law Clinic at the University of Michigan Law School. He is most known for his contributions to the area of child advocacy and child welfare and has been a recipient of numerous awards, including the Michigan Governor's Task Force on Children's Justice Ernie Moore Justice for Children Award and a Lifetime Achievement Award from the National Association of Counsel for Children.

He has authored peer-reviewed articles that cover topics including child abuse and neglect, the role of the children's lawyer, characteristics of attorneys who represent children in child welfare cases, child protection, and legal representation of children.

== Education ==
Duquette completed his undergraduate studies in social science, majoring in sociology, psychology, and social work from Michigan State University in 1969. In 1974, he received his Juris Doctor from the University of Michigan Law School.

== Career ==
In 1975, following law school graduation, he began his academic career as an assistant professor in the Department of Pediatrics and Human Development, College of Human Medicine at Michigan State University. In 1976, he became an Assistant Clinical Professor of Law and Director of the Child Advocacy Law Clinic at the University of Michigan Law School. Later, he was promoted to Clinical Professor of Law. He retired in 2016 and is currently a Clinical Professor of Law Emeritus and Founding Director Emeritus of the Child Advocacy Law Clinic.

From 1979 to 1989, Duquette was co-director of the University of Michigan's Interdisciplinary Project on Child Abuse and Neglect, a training, service, and research project including Schools of Law and Social Work, and Medical School Departments of Pediatrics and Psychiatry.

The Child Advocacy Law Clinic, which Duquette founded in 1976, is the first such clinical law program focused on matters related to child abuse and neglect. As the Founding Director, he oversaw the organization and administration of the clinic, taught companion simulations and seminars on topics such as trial advocacy, negotiation, interviewing, and child abuse and neglect law and policy, and supervised student attorneys in preparing and trying actual cases. In this clinic, law students represented children, parents, or the government agency in separate Michigan counties, bringing or defending child protection or termination of parental rights cases in court. Typically each student team was assigned a variety of child welfare cases, providing a comprehensive understanding of the different perspectives and concerns of each legal role.

== Community service ==
From 1981 to 1989 Duquette was elected four times to member of the Washtenaw County Board of Commissioners (Democrat).

== Scholarship ==
Duquette's research interests encompass aspects of child advocacy and child welfare law and practice. In his first book, Advocating for the Child in Protection Proceedings: A Handbook for Lawyers and Court Appointed Special Advocates, he proposed the first nationwide evaluation of child representation, which was subsequently mandated by the United States Congress. Between 1994 and 1998, he collaborated with the W.K. Kellogg Foundation on their Families for Kids Initiative intended to reduce the number of children entering foster care and improve the experience of children who entered care. As part of the Clinton administration's Adoption 2000 Project, he served as a Legal Consultant to the U.S. Children's Bureau (1997–98) where he managed an expert work group convened by the Bureau. He co-drafted the final report, Guidelines for Public Policy and State Legislation Governing Permanence for Children (1999).

In a contribution to the child welfare field, Duquette initiated and co-directed a project with the National Association of Counsel for Children, which defined a legal specialty in child welfare law and established a national certification in that specialty approved by the American Bar Association. He was the principal editor of the first three editions of the book, Child Welfare Law and Practice: Representing Children, Parents, and State Agencies in Abuse, Neglect, and Dependency Cases.

== National Quality Improvement Center for Child Representation in Child Welfare Cases ==
From 2009 to 2016, Duquette directed the National Quality Improvement Center for Child Representation in Child Welfare Cases (QIC-ChildRep), a seven-year program funded by the US Children's Bureau. The QIC-ChildRep evaluated the state of legal child representation nationwide and developed a best practice model. Random-assignment empirical research demonstrated that the QIC Model improved a child's legal representation. The findings of this project provide empirical evidence on the legal representation of children which is reported in Children's Justice: How to Improve Legal Representation of Children in the Child Welfare System. Children's Justice recommends ways to improve the legal representation of children in America's child welfare system.

== Awards and honors ==
- 1998 – Adoption Activist Award, the North American Council on Adoptable Children
- 2012 – Ernie Moore Justice for Children Award, Governor's Task Force on Child Abuse and Neglect.
- 2015 – Lifetime Achievement Award, National Association of Counsel for Children

== Bibliography ==
=== Books ===
- Advocating for the Child in Protection Proceedings: A Handbook for Lawyers and Court Appointed Special Advocates (1998) ISBN 9780669214659
- Child Welfare Law and Practice Representing Children, Parents, and State Agencies in Abuse, Neglect, and Dependency Cases (2005) ISBN 9781938614552
- Duquette, D. N., & Haralambie, A. M. (2010). Child welfare law and practice: Representing children, parents, and state agencies in abuse, neglect, and dependency cases. (No Title).
- Duquette, D. N., Haralambie, A. M., & Sankaran, V. S. (2016). Child welfare law and practice: Representing children, parents, and state agencies in abuse, neglect, and dependency cases. (No Title).
- Children's Justice: How to Improve Legal Representation of Children in the Child Welfare System (2016) ISBN 9781634257572

=== Articles ===
- Duquette, Donald N.; Ramsey, Sarah H. (January 1986). "Using lay volunteers to represent children in child protection court proceedings". Child Abuse & Neglect. 10 (3): 293–308. doi:10.1016/0145-2134(86)90005-0. PMID 3742276.
- Duquette, Donald (1992). "Child Protection Legal Process: Comparing the United States and Great Britain". Articles. 54: 239–294.
- Duquette, Donald (1997). "Developing a Child Advocacy Law Clinic: A Law School Clinical Legal Education Opportunity Authors". University of Michigan Journal of Law Reform. 31 (1): 1–32. doi:10.36646/mjlr.31.1.developing.
- Duquette, Donald; Danzinger, Sandra; Abbey, Joan; Seefeldt, Kristin (1997). "We Know Better Than We Do: A Policy Framework for Child Welfare Reform". University of Michigan Journal of Law Reform. 31 (1): 93–157. doi:10.36646/mjlr.31.1.we.
- Duquette, Donald (2009). "Child Protection – What Ought to Be". Family Advocate. 31 (3): 26–27.
