= Elzear Duquette =

Canadian solo walker (1910–1988)

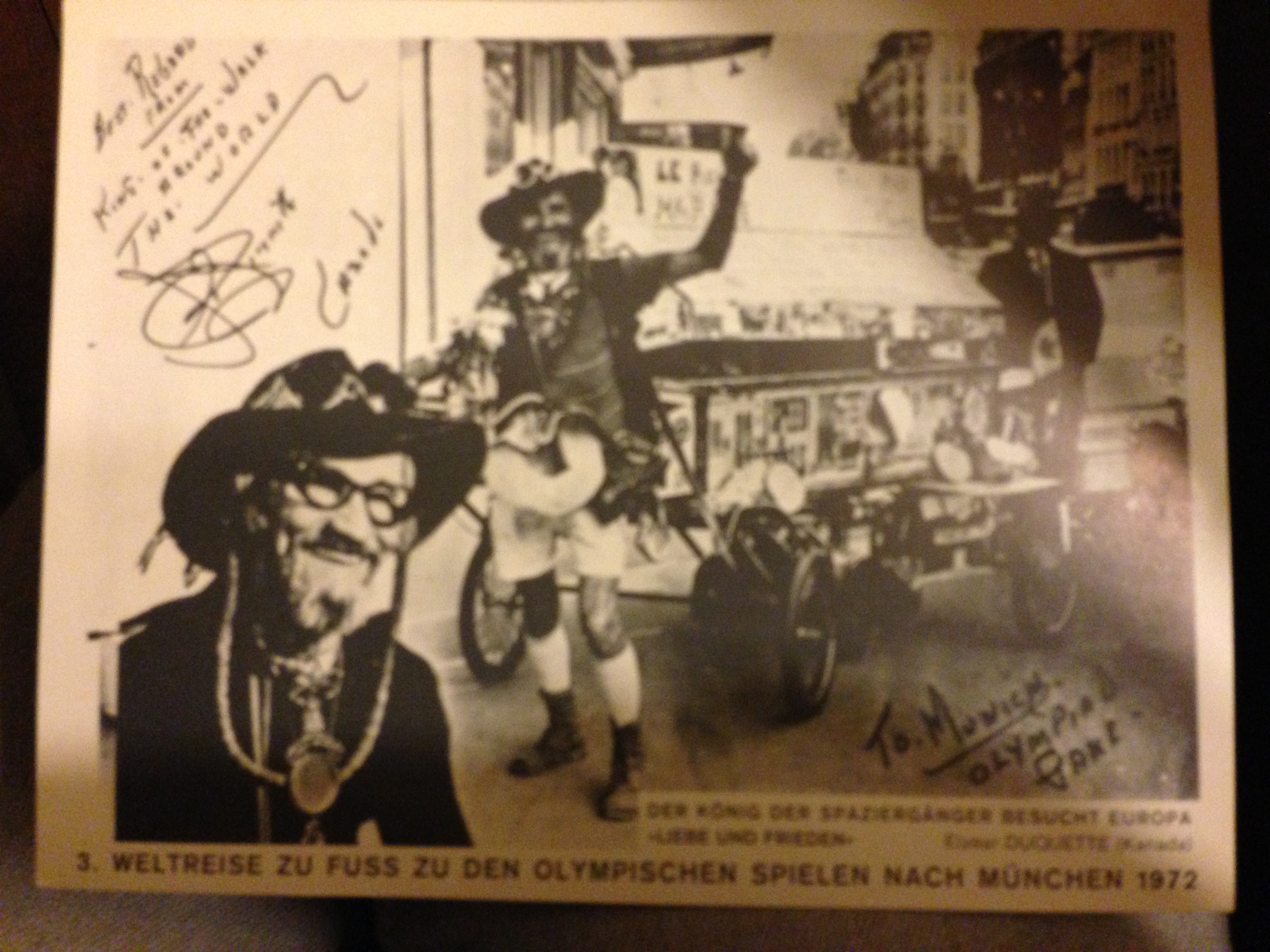
Elzéar Duquette

Elzear Duquette (1910 Mirabel, Quebec – February 6, 1988 Saint-Sulpice, Quebec) was a Canadian long-distance walker who undertook multiple cross-continental solo endurance walks. Dubbed the "King of the Walk," Duquette walked for over 40 years.

From 1969 to 1976, Duquette traveled on foot round trip from Montreal to destinations including Vancouver, Tokyo, and Paris. He covered over 23,000 miles on his trips.

Duquette pulled a small cart, which he called his "coffin," which he both slept in and used to carry all of his necessities for the trip. He supported himself through the sale of mementos and through television appearances along the journey.
