= Psalm 35 =

Biblical psalm

- "Plead my cause, O LORD, with them that strive with me"
- Other name: Psalm 34; "Iudica Domine nocentes me "
- Text: attributed to King David
- Language: Hebrew (original)

Psalm 35
- ← Psalm 34 Psalm 36 →
- Book: Book of Psalms
- Hebrew Bible part: Ketuvim
- Order in the Hebrew part: 1
- Category: Sifrei Emet
- Christian Bible part: Old Testament
- Order in the Christian part: 19

Psalm 35 is the 35th psalm of the Book of Psalms, beginning in English in the King James Version: "Plead my cause, O LORD, with them that strive with me: fight against them that fight against me." It is titled there: The Lord the Avenger of His People. The Book of Psalms is part of the third section of the Hebrew Bible, and a book of the Christian Old Testament. In the slightly different numbering system used in the Greek Septuagint and Latin Vulgate translations of the Bible, this psalm is Psalm 34. In Latin, it is known by the incipit, "Iudica Domine nocentes me". It is generally attributed to King David, although some commentators attribute it to the prophet Jeremiah.

Psalm 35 is used in both Jewish and Christian liturgies. It has been set to music, in German by Heinrich Schütz and in Latin by Marc-Antoine Charpentier, among others.

== Structure ==
The Evangelical Heritage Version divides the psalm into an opening prayer (verses 1–3), an account of "the attacks of the wicked" against its author (verses 11–16), three petitions (verses 4–8, 17, and 19–27), and three vows (verses 9–10, 18 and 28).

== Summary ==
Relentless enemies are seeking the psalmist's life. Their hostility is groundless, and its maliciousness is aggravated by their ingratitude. He appeals to God to do him justice and deliver him. Each of these points is illustrated by the narrative of David's persecution by Saul in the First Book of Samuel; however, it is not against Saul himself that the psalm is directed, but against the men who fomented his insane jealousy.

== Uses ==
=== Judaism ===
- Verse 10 is part of Nishmat.

=== Christianity ===
==== New Testament ====
- In the New Testament, verse 19b, They hated me without cause, is quoted in John 15:25, where Jesus states that the words are 'fulfilled' in himself.

==== Book of Common Prayer ====
In the Church of England's Book of Common Prayer, this psalm is appointed to be read on the morning of the seventh day of the month.

==== Catholic Church ====
Beginning in 1912, Psalm 35 has become part of the Tenebrae liturgy during the Holy Week.

==== Historical usage ====
The first prayer when the American First Continental Congress met in early September 1774 was taken from Psalm 35:1.

== Musical settings ==
Heinrich Schütz wrote a setting of a paraphrase of Psalm 35 in German, "Herr, hader mit den Hadrern mein", SWV 132, for the Becker Psalter, published first in 1628. Marc-Antoine Charpentier wrote a motet in Latin, Judica Domine nocentes me, H. 201, for two voices, two treble instruments and continuo. and François Giroust.

== Text ==
The following table shows the Hebrew text of the Psalm with vowels, alongside the Koine Greek text in the Septuagint and the English translation from the King James Version. Note that the meaning can slightly differ between these versions, as the Septuagint and the Masoretic Text come from different textual traditions. (Note: A 1917 translation directly from Hebrew to English by the Jewish Publication Society can be found here or here, and an 1844 translation directly from the Septuagint by L. C. L. Brenton can be found here. Both translations are in the public domain.) In the Septuagint, this psalm is numbered Psalm 34.

#	Hebrew	English	Greek
1	לְדָוִ֨ד ׀ רִיבָ֣ה יְ֭הֹוָה אֶת־יְרִיבַ֑י לְ֝חַ֗ם אֶת־לֹחֲמָֽי׃	(A Psalm of David.) Plead my cause, O LORD, with them that strive with me: fight against them that fight against me.	Τῷ Δαυΐδ. - ΔΙΚΑΣΟΝ, Κύριε, τοὺς ἀδικοῦντάς με, πολέμησον τοὺς πολεμοῦντάς με.
2	הַחֲזֵ֣ק מָגֵ֣ן וְצִנָּ֑ה וְ֝ק֗וּמָה בְּעֶזְרָתִֽי׃	Take hold of shield and buckler, and stand up for mine help.	ἐπιλαβοῦ ὅπλου καὶ θυρεοῦ καὶ ἀνάστηθι εἰς τὴν βοήθειάν μου,
3	וְהָ֘רֵ֤ק חֲנִ֣ית וּ֭סְגֹר לִקְרַ֣את רֹדְפָ֑י אֱמֹ֥ר לְ֝נַפְשִׁ֗י יְֽשֻׁעָתֵ֥ךְ אָֽנִי׃	Draw out also the spear, and stop the way against them that persecute me: say unto my soul, I am thy salvation.	ἔκχεον ῥομφαίαν καὶ σύγκλεισον ἐξ ἐναντίας τῶν καταδιωκόντων με· εἶπον τῇ ψυχῇ μου· Σωτηρία σού εἰμι ἐγώ.
4	יֵבֹ֣שׁוּ וְיִכָּלְמוּ֮ מְבַקְשֵׁ֢י נַ֫פְשִׁ֥י יִסֹּ֣גוּ אָח֣וֹר וְיַחְפְּר֑וּ חֹ֝שְׁבֵ֗י רָֽעָתִֽי׃	Let them be confounded and put to shame that seek after my soul: let them be turned back and brought to confusion that devise my hurt.	αἰσχυνθήτωσαν καὶ ἐντραπήτωσαν οἱ ζητοῦντες τὴν ψυχήν μου, ἀποστραφήτωσαν εἰς τὰ ὀπίσω καὶ καταισχυνθήτωσαν οἱ λογιζόμενοί μοι κακά.
5	יִֽהְי֗וּ כְּמֹ֥ץ לִפְנֵי־ר֑וּחַ וּמַלְאַ֖ךְ יְהֹוָ֣ה דּוֹחֶֽה׃	Let them be as chaff before the wind: and let the angel of the LORD chase them.	γενηθήτωσαν ὡσεὶ χνοῦς κατὰ πρόσωπον ἀνέμου, καὶ ἄγγελος Κυρίου ἐκθλίβων αὐτούς·
6	יְֽהִי־דַרְכָּ֗ם חֹ֥שֶׁךְ וַחֲלַקְלַקֹּ֑ת וּמַלְאַ֥ךְ יְ֝הֹוָ֗ה רֹדְפָֽם׃	Let their way be dark and slippery: and let the angel of the LORD persecute them.	γενηθήτω ἡ ὁδὸς αὐτῶν σκότος καὶ ὀλίσθημα, καὶ ἄγγελος Κυρίου καταδιώκων αὐτούς·
7	כִּֽי־חִנָּ֣ם טָֽמְנוּ־לִ֭י שַׁ֣חַת רִשְׁתָּ֑ם חִ֝נָּ֗ם חָפְר֥וּ לְנַפְשִֽׁי׃	For without cause have they hid for me their net in a pit, which without cause they have digged for my soul.	ὅτι δωρεὰν ἔκρυψάν μοι διαφθορὰν παγίδος αὐτῶν, μάτην ὠνείδισαν τὴν ψυχήν μου.
8	תְּבוֹאֵ֣הוּ שׁוֹאָה֮ לֹֽא־יֵ֫דָ֥ע וְרִשְׁתּ֣וֹ אֲשֶׁר־טָמַ֣ן תִּלְכְּד֑וֹ בְּ֝שׁוֹאָ֗ה יִפׇּל־בָּֽהּ׃	Let destruction come upon him at unawares; and let his net that he hath hid catch himself: into that very destruction let him fall.	ἐλθέτω αὐτῷ παγίς, ἣν οὐ γινώσκει, καὶ ἡ θήρα, ἣν ἔκρυψε, συλλαβέτω αὐτόν, καὶ ἐν τῇ παγίδι πεσεῖται ἐν αὐτῇ.
9	וְ֭נַפְשִׁי תָּגִ֣יל בַּיהֹוָ֑ה תָּ֝שִׂ֗ישׂ בִּישׁוּעָתֽוֹ׃	And my soul shall be joyful in the LORD: it shall rejoice in his salvation.	ἡ δὲ ψυχή μου ἀγαλλιάσεται ἐπὶ τῷ Κυρίῳ, τερφθήσεται ἐπὶ τῷ σωτηρίῳ αὐτοῦ.
10	כׇּ֥ל־עַצְמוֹתַ֨י ׀ תֹּאמַרְנָה֮ יְהֹוָ֗ה מִ֥י כָ֫מ֥וֹךָ מַצִּ֣יל עָ֭נִי מֵחָזָ֣ק מִמֶּ֑נּוּ וְעָנִ֥י וְ֝אֶבְי֗וֹן מִגֹּֽזְלֽוֹ׃	All my bones shall say, LORD, who is like unto thee, which deliverest the poor from him that is too strong for him, yea, the poor and the needy from him that spoileth him?	πάντα τὰ ὀστᾶ μου ἐροῦσι· Κύριε, τίς ὅμοιός σοι; ῥυόμενος πτωχὸν ἐκ χειρὸς στερεωτέρων αὐτοῦ καὶ πτωχὸν καὶ πένητα ἀπὸ τῶν διαρπαζόντων αὐτόν.
11	יְ֭קוּמוּן עֵדֵ֣י חָמָ֑ס אֲשֶׁ֥ר לֹֽא־יָ֝דַ֗עְתִּי יִשְׁאָלֽוּנִי׃	False witnesses did rise up; they laid to my charge things that I knew not.	ἀναστάντες μοι μάρτυρες ἄδικοι, ἃ οὐκ ἐγίνωσκον, ἐπηρώτων με.
12	יְשַׁלְּמ֣וּנִי רָ֭עָה תַּ֥חַת טוֹבָ֗ה שְׁכ֣וֹל לְנַפְשִֽׁי׃	They rewarded me evil for good to the spoiling of my soul.	ἀνταπεδίδοσάν μοι πονηρὰ ἀντὶ ἀγαθῶν καὶ ἀτεκνίαν τῇ ψυχῇ μου.
13	וַאֲנִ֤י ׀ בַּחֲלוֹתָ֡ם לְב֬וּשִׁי שָׂ֗ק עִנֵּ֣יתִי בַצּ֣וֹם נַפְשִׁ֑י וּ֝תְפִלָּתִ֗י עַל־חֵיקִ֥י תָשֽׁוּב׃	But as for me, when they were sick, my clothing was sackcloth: I humbled my soul with fasting; and my prayer returned into mine own bosom.	ἐγὼ δὲ ἐν τῷ αὐτοὺς παρενοχλεῖν μοι ἐνεδυόμην σάκκον καὶ ἐταπείνουν ἐν νηστείᾳ τὴν ψυχήν μου, καὶ ἡ προσευχή μου εἰς κόλπον μου ἀποστραφήσεται.
14	כְּרֵעַ־כְּאָ֣ח לִ֭י הִתְהַלָּ֑כְתִּי כַּאֲבֶל־אֵ֝֗ם קֹדֵ֥ר שַׁחֽוֹתִי׃	I behaved myself as though he had been my friend or brother: I bowed down heavily, as one that mourneth for his mother.	ὡς πλησίον, ὡς ἀδελφῷ ἡμετέρῳ οὕτως εὐηρέστουν· ὡς πενθῶν καὶ σκυθρωπάζων, οὕτως ἐταπεινούμην.
15	וּבְצַלְעִי֮ שָׂמְח֢וּ וְֽנֶ֫אֱסָ֥פוּ נֶאֶסְפ֬וּ עָלַ֣י נֵ֭כִים וְלֹ֣א יָדַ֑עְתִּי קָרְע֥וּ וְלֹא־דָֽמּוּ׃	But in mine adversity they rejoiced, and gathered themselves together: yea, the abjects gathered themselves together against me, and I knew it not; they did tear me, and ceased not:	καὶ κατ᾿ ἐμοῦ εὐφράνθησαν καὶ συνήχθησαν, συνήχθησαν ἐπ᾿ ἐμὲ μάστιγες, καὶ οὐκ ἔγνων, διεσχίσθησαν καὶ οὐ κατενύγησαν.
16	בְּ֭חַנְפֵי לַעֲגֵ֣י מָע֑וֹג חָרֹ֖ק עָלַ֣י שִׁנֵּֽימוֹ׃	With hypocritical mockers in feasts, they gnashed upon me with their teeth.	ἐπείρασάν με, ἐξεμυκτήρισάν με μυκτηρισμῷ, ἔβρυξαν ἐπ ἐμὲ τοὺς ὀδόντας αὐτῶν.
17	אֲדֹנָי֮ כַּמָּ֢ה תִ֫רְאֶ֥ה הָשִׁ֣יבָה נַ֭פְשִׁי מִשֹּׁאֵיהֶ֑ם מִ֝כְּפִירִ֗ים יְחִידָתִֽי׃	Lord, how long wilt thou look on? rescue my soul from their destructions, my darling from the lions.	Κύριε, πότε ἐπόψῃ; ἀποκατάστησον τὴν ψυχήν μου ἀπὸ τῆς κακουργίας αὐτῶν, ἀπὸ λεόντων τὴν μονογενῆ μου.
18	א֭וֹדְךָ בְּקָהָ֣ל רָ֑ב בְּעַ֖ם עָצ֣וּם אֲהַלְלֶֽךָּ׃	I will give thee thanks in the great congregation: I will praise thee among much people.	ἐξομολογήσομαί σοι ἐν ἐκκλησίᾳ πολλῇ, ἐν λαῷ βαρεῖ αἰνέσω σε.
19	אַֽל־יִשְׂמְחוּ־לִ֣י אֹיְבַ֣י שֶׁ֑קֶר שֹׂנְאַ֥י חִ֝נָּ֗ם יִקְרְצוּ־עָֽיִן׃	Let not them that are mine enemies wrongfully rejoice over me: neither let them wink with the eye that hate me without a cause.	μὴ ἐπιχαρείησάν μοι οἱ ἐχθραίνοντές μοι ἀδίκως, οἱ μισοῦντες με δωρεὰν καὶ διανεύοντες ὀφθαλμοῖς.
20	כִּ֤י לֹ֥א שָׁל֗וֹם יְדַ֫בֵּ֥רוּ וְעַ֥ל רִגְעֵי־אֶ֑רֶץ דִּבְרֵ֥י מִ֝רְמ֗וֹת יַחֲשֹׁבֽוּן׃	For they speak not peace: but they devise deceitful matters against them that are quiet in the land.	ὅτι ἐμοὶ μὲν εἰρηνικὰ ἐλάλουν καὶ ἐπ᾿ ὀργὴν δόλους διελογίζοντο.
21	וַיַּרְחִ֥יבוּ עָלַ֗י פִּ֫יהֶ֥ם אָ֭מְרוּ הֶאָ֣ח ׀ הֶאָ֑ח רָֽאֲתָ֥ה עֵינֵֽנוּ׃	Yea, they opened their mouth wide against me, and said, Aha, aha, our eye hath seen it.	καὶ ἐπλάτυναν ἐπ᾿ ἐμὲ τὸ στόμα αὐτῶν, εἶπαν· εὖγε, εὖγε, εἶδον οἱ ὀφθαλμοὶ ἡμῶν.
22	רָאִ֣יתָה יְ֭הֹוָה אַֽל־תֶּחֱרַ֑שׁ אֲ֝דֹנָ֗י אַל־תִּרְחַ֥ק מִמֶּֽנִּי׃	This thou hast seen, O LORD: keep not silence: O Lord, be not far from me.	εἶδες, Κύριε, μὴ παρασιωπήσῃς, Κύριε, μὴ ἀποστῇς ἀπ᾿ ἐμοῦ·
23	הָעִ֣ירָה וְ֭הָקִיצָה לְמִשְׁפָּטִ֑י אֱלֹהַ֖י וַאדֹנָ֣י לְרִיבִֽי׃	Stir up thyself, and awake to my judgment, even unto my cause, my God and my Lord.	ἐξεγέρθητι, Κύριε, καὶ πρόσχες τῇ κρίσει μου, ὁ Θεός μου καὶ ὁ Κύριός μου, εἰς τὴν δίκην μου.
24	שׇׁפְטֵ֣נִי כְ֭צִדְקְךָ יְהֹוָ֥ה אֱלֹהָ֗י וְאַל־יִשְׂמְחוּ־לִֽי׃	Judge me, O LORD my God, according to thy righteousness; and let them not rejoice over me.	κρῖνόν με, Κύριε, κατὰ τὴν δικαιοσύνην σου, Κύριε ὁ Θεός μου, καὶ μὴ ἐπιχαρείησάν μοι.
25	אַל־יֹאמְר֣וּ בְ֭לִבָּם הֶאָ֣ח נַפְשֵׁ֑נוּ אַל־יֹ֝אמְר֗וּ בִּֽלַּעֲנֽוּהוּ׃	Let them not say in their hearts, Ah, so would we have it: let them not say, We have swallowed him up.	μὴ εἴποισαν ἐν καρδίαις αὐτῶν· εὖγε, εὖγε τῇ ψυχῇ ἡμῶν· μηδὲ εἴποιεν· Κατεπίομεν αὐτόν.
26	יֵ֘בֹ֤שׁוּ וְיַחְפְּר֨וּ ׀ יַחְדָּו֮ שְׂמֵחֵ֢י רָעָ֫תִ֥י יִֽלְבְּשׁוּ־בֹ֥שֶׁת וּכְלִמָּ֑ה הַֽמַּגְדִּילִ֥ים עָלָֽי׃	Let them be ashamed and brought to confusion together that rejoice at mine hurt: let them be clothed with shame and dishonour that magnify themselves against me.	αἰσχυνθείησαν καὶ ἐντραπείησαν ἅμα οἱ ἐπιχαίροντες τοῖς κακοῖς μου, ἐνδυσάσθωσαν αἰσχύνην καὶ ἐντροπὴν οἱ μεγαλοῤῥημονοῦντες ἐπ᾿ ἐμέ.
27	יָרֹ֣נּוּ וְיִשְׂמְחוּ֮ חֲפֵצֵ֢י צִ֫דְקִ֥י וְיֹאמְר֣וּ תָ֭מִיד יִגְדַּ֣ל יְהֹוָ֑ה הֶ֝חָפֵ֗ץ שְׁל֣וֹם עַבְדּֽוֹ׃	Let them shout for joy, and be glad, that favour my righteous cause: yea, let them say continually, Let the LORD be magnified, which hath pleasure in the prosperity of his servant.	ἀγαλλιάσθωσαν καὶ εὐφρανθήτωσαν οἱ θέλοντες τὴν δικαιοσύνην μου καὶ εἰπάτωσαν διαπαντός· μεγαλυνθήτω ὁ Κύριος, οἱ θέλοντες τὴν εἰρήνην τοῦ δούλου αὐτοῦ.
28	וּ֭לְשׁוֹנִי תֶּהְגֶּ֣ה צִדְקֶ֑ךָ כׇּל־הַ֝יּ֗וֹם תְּהִלָּתֶֽךָ׃	And my tongue shall speak of thy righteousness and of thy praise all the day long.	καὶ ἡ γλῶσσά μου μελετήσει τὴν δικαιοσύνην σου, ὅλην τὴν ἡμέραν τὸν ἔπαινόν σου.
