= American civil religion =

Sociological theory

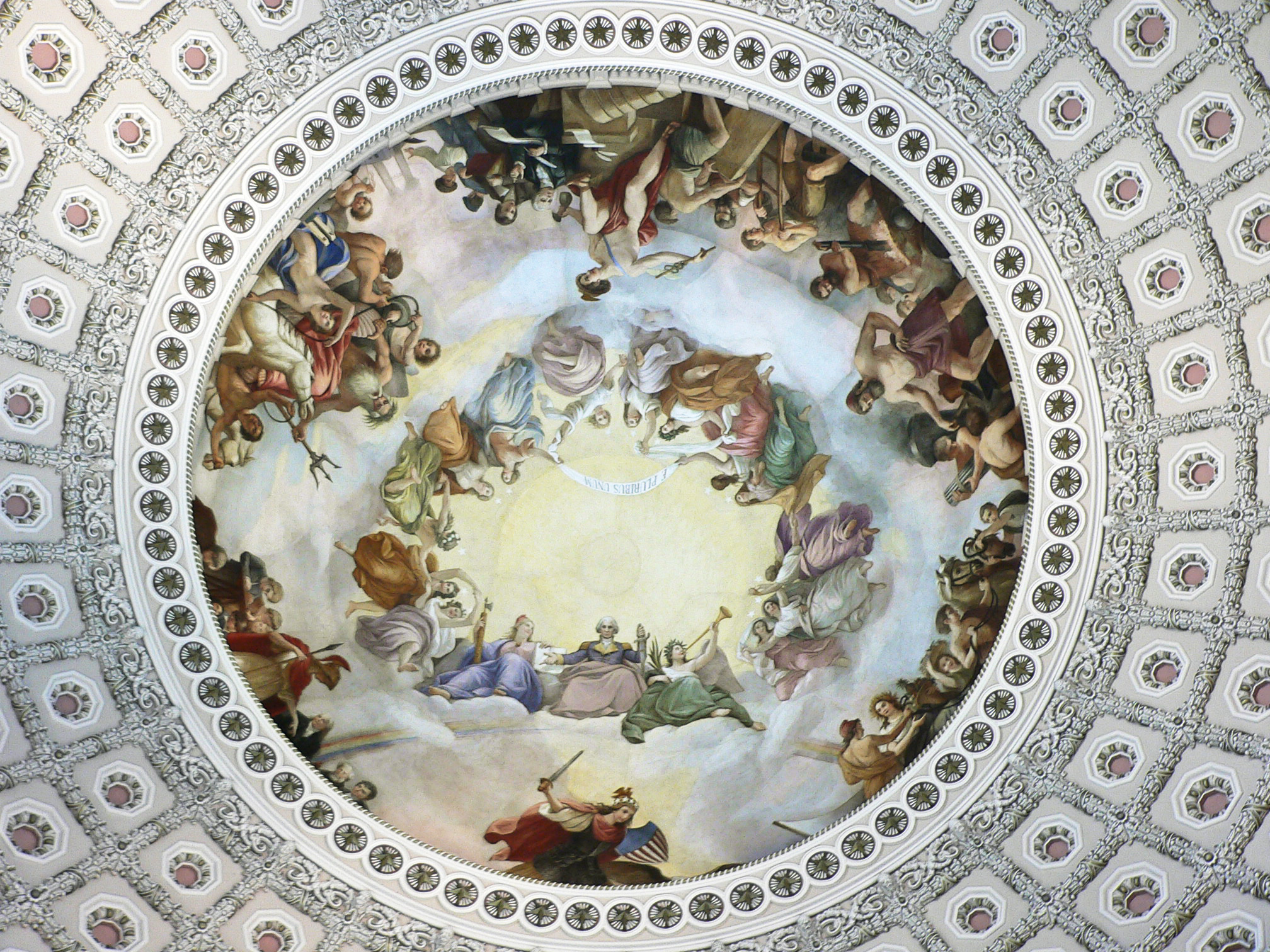
The Apotheosis of Washington, on the ceiling of the Capitol Rotunda. George Washington is shown as having ascended to a divine status.

American civil religion is a sociological theory that a nonsectarian civil religion exists within the United States with sacred symbols drawn from the national history of the United States. Scholars have portrayed it as a common set of values that foster social and cultural integration. The ritualistic elements of ceremonial deism found in American ceremonies and presidential invocations of God can be seen as expressions of the American civil religion.

The concept goes back to the 19th century, but the current form of this theory was developed by sociologist Robert Bellah in 1967 in the article "Civil Religion in America". According to him, many Americans embrace a common civil religion with certain fundamental beliefs, values, symbols, holidays, and rituals in parallel to, or independent of, their chosen religion. Bellah's article soon became the major focus at religious sociology conferences, and numerous articles and books were written on the subject. Interest in the topic peaked with the United States Bicentennial celebration in 1976. Other names which have been used include "religion of the republic," "civic faith," or "public piety."

== Theory ==
Bellah posits that Americans have come to see the document of the United States Constitution, along with the Declaration of Independence and the Bill of Rights, as cornerstones of a type of civil religion or political religion. Political sociologist Anthony Squiers argues that these texts act as the sacred writ of the American civil religion because they are used as authoritative symbols in what he calls the politics of the sacred. The politics of the sacred, according to Squiers, are "the attempt to define and dictate what is in accord with the civil religious sacred and what is not. It is a battle to define what can and cannot be and what should and should not be tolerated and accepted in the community, based on its relation to that which is sacred for that community."

Bellah later revised his assessment of American civil religion. In The Broken Covenant: American Civil Religion In Time of Trial, he argued that the United States had broken the moral covenant implicit in its founding ideals, and that American civil religion had become "an empty and broken shell," no longer capable of providing the moral resources needed to sustain democratic life. Written against the backdrop of the Vietnam War and the Watergate scandal, the book contended that a pervasive culture of individualism and materialism had eroded the shared civic faith Bellah had described in 1967, and that the continuing deterioration of civil religion risked producing political instability.

The nation provides quasi-religious central roles to its presidents and honors to its martyrs, such as Abraham Lincoln and the soldiers killed in the American Civil War. Historians have noted presidential-level use of civil religion rhetoric in profoundly moving episodes such as World War II, the Civil Rights Movement, and the September 11 attacks.

== Development ==
Alexis de Tocqueville believed Christianity was the source of the basic principles of liberal democracy and the only religion capable of maintaining liberty in a democratic era. He was keenly aware of the mutual hatred between Christians and liberals in 19th-century France, rooted in the Enlightenment and the French Revolution. In France, Christianity was allied with the Old Regime before 1789 and the reactionary Bourbon Restoration of 1815–1830. However, he said Christianity was not antagonistic to democracy in the United States, where it was a bulwark against dangerous tendencies toward individualism and materialism, which would lead to atheism and tyranny.

Also significant were the contributions of French philosopher Jean-Jacques Rousseau and French sociologist Émile Durkheim. Rousseau introduced the concept of civil religion in The Social Contract, arguing that a stable democratic society required a set of shared civic beliefs — distinct from institutional Christianity — that bound citizens together through common moral commitments. Durkheim's later work expanded this foundation, arguing in The Elementary Forms of the Religious Life that religion functions primarily as a social phenomenon, producing collective rituals and shared symbols that reinforce group identity and solidarity. Bellah drew directly on both thinkers in formulating his account of American civil religion.

=== The American case ===
Most students of American civil religion follow the basic interpretation by Bellah and Durkheim. Other sources of this idea include these: philosopher John Dewey who spoke of "common faith" (1934); sociologist Robin Murphy Williams's American Society: A Sociological Interpretation (1951) which describes a "common religion" in America; sociologist Lloyd Warner's analysis of the Memorial Day celebrations in "Yankee City" (1953 [1974]); historian Martin Marty's "religion in general" (1959); theologian Will Herberg who spoke of "the American Way of Life" (1960, 1974); historian Sidney Mead's "religion of the Republic" (1963); and British writer G. K. Chesterton, who said that the United States was "the only nation ... founded on a creed" and also coined the phrase "a nation with a soul of a church".

In the same period, several distinguished historians such as Yehoshua Arieli, Daniel Boorstin, and Ralph Gabriel "assessed the religious dimension of 'nationalism', the 'American creed', 'cultural religion', and the 'democratic faith'".

Premier sociologist Seymour Lipset (1963) referred to "Americanism" and the "American Creed" to characterize a distinct set of values that Americans hold with a quasi-religious fervor.

Today, according to social scientists Ronald Wimberley and William Swatos, there seems to be a firm consensus among social scientists that a part of Americanism is especially religious in nature, which may be termed civil religion. But this religious nature is less significant than the "transcendent universal religion of the nation" which late eighteenth-century French intellectuals such as Jean-Jacques Rousseau and Alexis de Tocqueville wrote about.

=== Evidence supporting Bellah ===
Ronald Wimberley (1976) and other researchers collected large surveys and factor analytic studies, which supported Bellah's argument that civil religion is a distinct cultural phenomenon within American society that is not embodied in American politics or denominational religion.

Examples of civil religious beliefs are reflected in statements used in the research, such as the following:

- "America is God's chosen nation today."
- "A president's authority ... is from God."
- "Social justice cannot only be based on laws; it must also come from religion."
- "God can be known through the experiences of the American people."
- "Holidays like the Fourth of July are religious as well as patriotic."
- "God Bless America"

A 1978 study by James Christenson and Ronald Wimberley found that many Americans hold civil-religious beliefs, though college graduates and political or religious liberals tended to be less so. Protestants and Catholics shared the same level of civil religiosity. Religions that originated in the United States—the Mormons, Adventists, and Pentecostals—had the highest civil religiosity. Jews, Unitarians, and those with no religious preference had the lowest civil religiosity. Even though there is variation in the scores, the "great majority" of Americans are found to share the types of civil religious beliefs that Bellah wrote about.

Further research revealed that civil religion affects preferences for political candidates and policies. In 1980, Wimberley found that civil religious beliefs were more influential than party loyalties in predicting support for Nixon over McGovern among Sunday churchgoers and local residents. In 1982, Christenson and Wimberley found that civil religion was second only to occupation in predicting a person's policy views.

Coleman has argued that civil religion is a widespread theme in history. He posits that it typically evolves in three phases: undifferentiation, state sponsorship in the period of modernization, and differentiation. He supports his argument with comparative historical data from Japan, Imperial Rome, the Soviet Union, Turkey, France, and the United States.

=== Scholarly Debate ===
Academic interest in the concept of American civil religion peaked in the early 1970s and subsequently declined. James A. Mathisen, surveying two decades of scholarship in "Twenty Years after Bellah: Whatever Happened to American Civil Religion?", published in Sociological Analysis in 1989, identified four phases in the academic debate since Bellah's 1967 essay and noted a sharp contraction in scholarly attention from the 1970s onward. Critics questioned whether civil religion was analytically distinct enough from nationalism or denominational religion to constitute a meaningful independent category, and whether the concept was defined with sufficient precision to be empirically tested. Some scholars accepted that Bellah had identified a genuine cultural phenomenon while arguing that he had overstated its internal coherence and its integration across different segments of American society.

== In practice ==
=== American Revolution ===
Catherine L. Albanese writes that the American Revolution is the main source of civil religion. Albanese's book Sons of the Fathers: The Civil Religion of the American Revolution says it produced these religious properties: a Moses-like leader in George Washington; prophets such as Thomas Jefferson and Thomas Paine; apostles such as John Adams and Benjamin Franklin; martyrs such as those who perished in the Boston Massacre and in Nathan Hale; devils such as Benedict Arnold and Hessian "mercenaries"; sacred places such as Independence Hall and Valley Forge; rituals such as raising the Liberty Pole; symbols such as the Betsy Ross flag; sacred holidays such as Independence Day; and a holy scripture based on the Declaration of Independence, Constitution, and the Bill of Rights.

Some of the founders, such as Benjamin Franklin, called for a "public religion" or encouraged disassociation with sects and denominations in favor of an individualized religious expression. However, careful specification was made to clarify that this public religion was still to be Christian-oriented. When discussing his idea of public religion, Franklin extolled "the Excellency of the CHRISTIAN RELIGION above all others ancient or modern."

=== Ceremonies in the early Republic ===
The leaders of the Federalist Party were conscious of the need to boost voter identification with their party. Elections remained of central importance but for the rest of the political year, celebrations, parades, festivals, and visual sensationalism were used. They employed multiple festivities, exciting parades, and even quasi-religious pilgrimages and "sacred" days that became incorporated into the American civil religion. George Washington was always its hero, and after his death he became a sort of demigod looking down from heaven to instill his blessings on the nation.

At first the Federalists focused on commemoration of the ratification of the Constitution; they organized parades to demonstrate widespread popular support for the new Federalist Party. The parade organizers incorporated secular versions of traditional religious themes and rituals, thereby fostering a highly visible celebration of the nation's new civil religion.

The Fourth of July has been a semi-sacred day since then. Its celebration in Boston proclaimed national over local patriotism, and included orations, dinners, militia musters, parades, marching bands, floats, and fireworks. By 1800, the Fourth was closely identified with the Federalist party. Republicans were annoyed, and staged their own celebrations on the Fourth—with rival parades sometimes clashing with each other. That generated even more excitement and larger crowds. After the collapse of the Federalists starting in 1815, the Fourth became a nonpartisan holiday.

=== President as religious leader ===
Since George Washington, presidents have assumed various roles in American civil religion, which has shaped the presidency. Linder argues that:

Throughout American history, the president has provided the leadership in the public faith. Sometimes he has functioned primarily as a national prophet, as did Abraham Lincoln. Occasionally he has served primarily as the nation's pastor, as did Dwight Eisenhower. At other times he has performed primarily as the high priest of the civil religion, as did Ronald Reagan. In prophetic civil religion, the president assesses the nation's actions in relation to transcendent values and calls upon the people to make sacrifices in times of crisis and to repent of their corporate sins when their behavior falls short of the national ideals. As the national pastor, he provides spiritual inspiration to the people by affirming American core values and urging them to appropriate those values, and by comforting them in their afflictions. In the priestly role, the president makes America itself the ultimate reference point. He leads the citizenry in affirming and celebrating the nation, and reminds them of the national mission, while at the same time glorifying and praising his political flock.

During the American Civil War, Abraham Lincoln saw "the nation itself as a kind of uncanonical church" according to Martin E. Marty, and after his death, Lincoln became a martyr and prophet for the American civil religion.

Charles W. Calhoun argues that in the 1880s, the speeches of Benjamin Harrison display a rhetorical style that embraced American civic religion; indeed, Harrison was one of the credo's most adept presidential practitioners. Harrison was a leader whose application of Christian ethics to social and economic matters paved the way for the Social Gospel, the Progressive Movement, and a national climate of acceptance regarding government action to resolve social problems.

Linder argues that President Bill Clinton's sense of civil religion was based on his Baptist background in Arkansas. Commentator William Safire noted of the 1992 presidential campaign that "Never has the name of God been so frequently invoked, and never has this or any nation been so thoroughly and systematically blessed." Clinton's speeches incorporated religious terminology that suggests the role of pastor rather than prophet or priest. With a universalistic outlook, he made no sharp distinction between the domestic and the foreign in presenting his vision of a world community of civil faith.

Brocker argues that Europeans have often mischaracterized the politics of President George W. Bush (2001–2009) as directly inspired by Protestant fundamentalism. However, in his speeches Bush mostly actually used civil religious metaphors and images and rarely used language specific to any Christian denomination. His foreign policy, says Bocker, was based on American security interests and not on any fundamentalist teachings.

Hammer says that in his 2008 campaign speeches candidate Barack Obama portrays the American nation as a people unified by a shared belief in the American Creed and sanctified by the symbolism of an American civil religion.

Would-be presidents likewise contributed to the rhetorical history of civil religion. The speeches of Daniel Webster were often memorized by student debaters, and his 1830 endorsement of "Liberty and Union, now and forever, one and inseparable" was iconic.

=== Symbolism of the American flag ===
According to Adam Goodheart, the modern meaning of the American flag, and the reverence of many Americans towards it, was forged by Major Robert Anderson's fight in defense of the flag at the Battle of Fort Sumter, which opened the American Civil War in April 1861. During the war the flag was used throughout the Union to symbolize American nationalism and rejection of secessionism. Goodheart explains the flag was transformed into a sacred symbol of patriotism:

Before that day, the flag had served mostly as a military ensign or a convenient marking of American territory ... and displayed on special occasions like the Fourth of July. But in the weeks after Major Anderson's surprising stand, it became something different. Suddenly the Stars and Stripes flew ... from houses, from storefronts, from churches; above the village greens and college quads. ... [T]hat old flag meant something new. The abstraction of the Union cause was transfigured into a physical thing: strips of cloth that millions of people would fight for, and many thousands die for.

=== Soldiers and veterans ===
An important dimension is the role of the soldiers, ready to sacrifice their lives to preserve the nation. They are memorialized in many monuments and semi-sacred days, such as Veterans Day and Memorial Day. Historian Jonathan Ebel argues that the "soldier-savior" is a sort of Messiah, who embodies the synthesis of civil religion, and the Christian ideals of sacrifice and redemption. In Europe, there are numerous cemeteries exclusively for American soldiers who fought in world wars. They have become American sacred spaces.

Pacifists have made some sharp criticisms. For example, Kelly Denton-Borhaug, writing from the Moravian peace tradition, argues that the theme of "sacrifice" has fueled the rise of what she calls "U.S. war culture". The result is a diversion of attention from what she considers the militarism and the immoral, oppressive, sometimes barbaric conduct in the global American war on terror.

=== Pledge of Allegiance ===
Kao and Copulsky argue the concept of civil religion illuminates the popular constitutional debate over the Pledge of Allegiance. The function of the pledge has four aspects: preservationist, pluralist, priestly, and prophetic. The debate is not between those who believe in God and those who do not, but it is a dispute on the meaning and place of civil religion in America.

Cloud explores political oaths since 1787 and traces the tension between a need for national unity and a desire to affirm religious faith. He reviews major Supreme Court decisions involving the Pledge of Allegiance, including the contradictory Minersville School District v. Gobitis (1940) and West Virginia v. Barnette (1943) decisions. He argues that the Pledge was changed in 1954 during the Cold War to encourage school children to reject communism's atheistic philosophy by affirming belief in God.

=== School rituals ===
Bellah wrote that "The public school system serves as a particularly important context for the cultic celebration of the civil rituals." Adam Gamoran (1990) argues that civil religion in public schools can be seen in such daily rituals as the pledge of allegiance; in holiday observances, with activities such as music and art; and in the social studies, history and English curricula. Civil religion in schools plays a dual role: it socializes youth to a common set of understandings, but it also sets off subgroups of Americans whose backgrounds or beliefs prevent them from participating fully in civil religious ceremonies.

=== Ethnic minorities ===
The Bellah argument deals with mainstream beliefs, but other scholars have looked at minorities outside the mainstream, and typically distrusted or disparaged by the mainstream, which have developed their own version of U.S. civil religion.

==== White Southerners ====
Historian Charles Reagan Wilson, noting the historic centrality of religion in Southern identity, argues that when the White South was kept out of the national mainstream in the late 19th century, it created its own pervasive common civil religion heavy with mythology, ritual, and organization. Wilson asserts the "Lost Cause"—that is, defeat in a holy war—has left some southerners to face guilt, doubt, and the triumph of what they perceive as evil: in other words, to form a tragic sense of life.

==== Black and African Americans ====
Woodrum and Bell argue that black people demonstrate less civil religiosity than white people and that different predictors of civil religion operate among black and white people. For example, conventional religion positively influences white people's civil religion but negatively influences black people's civil religion. Woodrum and Bell interpret these results as a product of black American religious ethnogenesis and separatism. In addition, as Frederick Douglass described in his "What to the Slave Is the Fourth of July?" speech in 1852, civil religion may be more complicated for Black Americans: "The sunlight that brought life and healing to you, has brought stripes and death to me. This Fourth of July is yours, not mine. You may rejoice, I must mourn."

Other scholars have argued that Black Americans did not simply exhibit lower civil religiosity, but developed a distinct alternative civil religious tradition rooted in biblical narrative rather than the founding documents. Eddie S. Glaude Jr., in Exodus!: Religion, Race, and Nation in Early Nineteenth-Century Black America, argues that the biblical Exodus narrative provided Black Americans with a counter-mythology to the dominant civil religious framework. Whereas mainstream American civil religion identified the United States with the biblical promised land, many Black Americans in the early nineteenth century drew on the Exodus story to cast America in the role of Egypt — a land of bondage — and themselves in the role of the Israelites seeking liberation. Glaude traces this tradition through the Black church and the National Negro Convention movement of the 1830s and 1840s, arguing that it constituted a distinct civil religious tradition grounded in the experience of slavery and discrimination, rather than in the Declaration of Independence or the Constitution.

==== Japanese Americans ====
Iwamura argues that the pilgrimages made by Japanese Americans to the sites of World War II-era internment camps have formed a Japanese American version of civil religion. Starting in 1969 the Reverend Sentoku Maeda and Reverend Soichi Wakahiro began pilgrimages to Manzanar National Historic Site in California. These pilgrimages included poetry readings, music, cultural events, a roll call of former internees, and a nondenominational ceremony with Protestant and Buddhist ministers and Catholic and Shinto priests. The event is designed to reinforce Japanese American cultural ties and to ensure that such injustices will never occur again.

==== Hispanic and Latino Americans ====
Mexican-American labor leader César Chávez, by virtue of having holidays, stamps, and other commemorations of his actions, has practically become a "saint" in American civil religion, according to León. He was raised in the Catholic tradition and used Catholic rhetoric. His "sacred acts", his political practices couched in Christian teachings, became influential to the burgeoning Chicano movement and strengthened his appeal. By acting on his moral convictions through nonviolent means, Chávez became sanctified in the national consciousness, says León.

== Enshrined texts ==
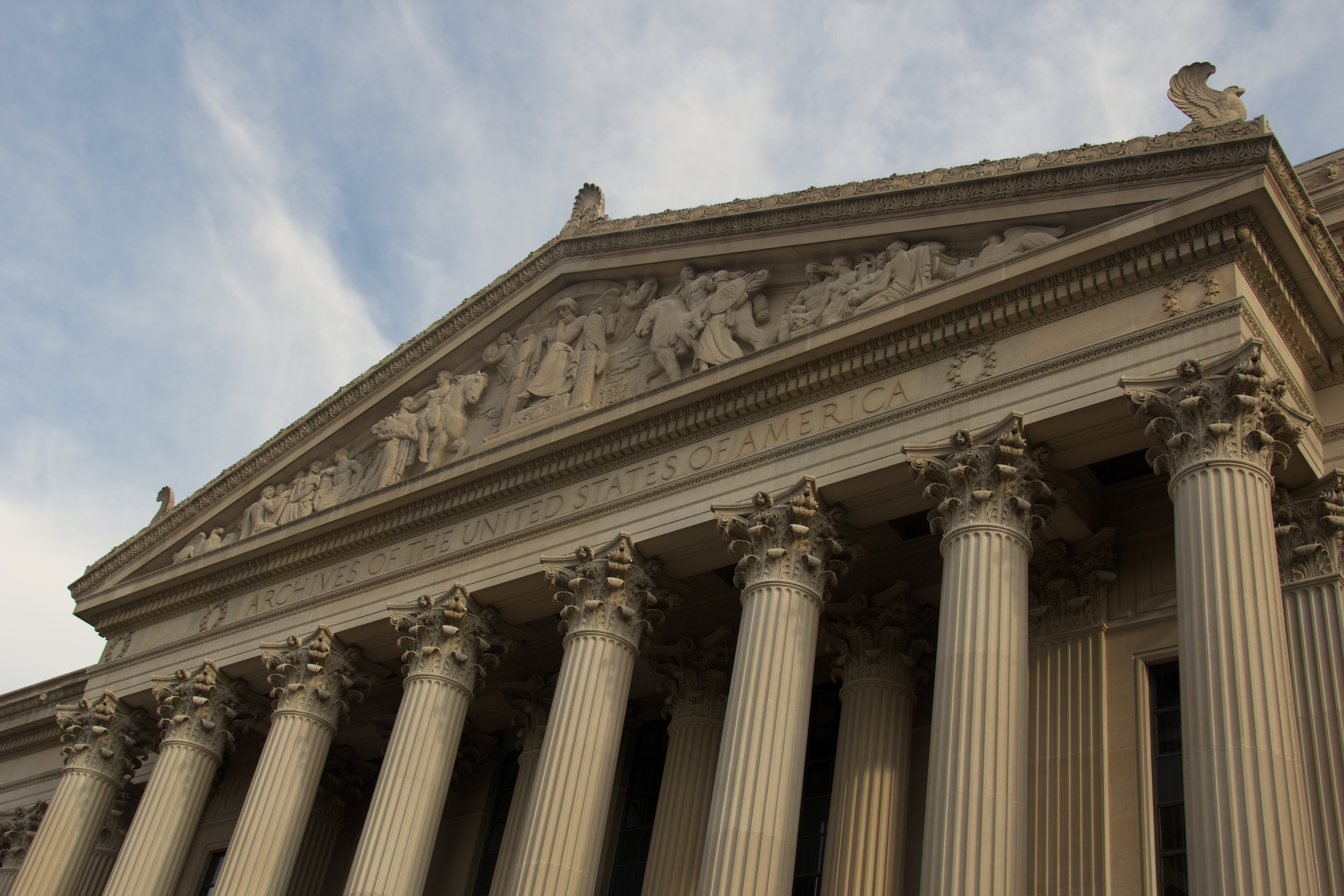
The National Archives Building in Washington, DC

During the American Revolution, Christian language, rhetoric, and values were used to help persuade American colonists of the values of the Patriot cause. The sermons of Patriot ministers were instrumental in promoting American nationalism and motivating colonists to take up arms against Britain. Together with the semi-religious tone sometimes adopted by military leaders as George Washington, and the notion that God favored the Patriot cause, this made the documents of the Founding Fathers suitable as almost-sacred texts.

The National Archives Building in Washington preserves and displays the Declaration of Independence, the Constitution and the Bill of Rights. Pauline Maier describes these texts as enshrined in massive, bronze-framed display cases. While political scientists, sociologists, and legal scholars study the Constitution and how it is used in American society, on the other hand, historians are concerned with putting themselves back into a time and place, in context. It would be anachronistic for them to look at the documents of the "Charters of Freedom" and see America's modern "civic religion" because of "how much Americans have transformed very secular and temporal documents into sacred scriptures". The treatment of the Declaration of Independence as a sacred object has been criticized by some academic historians as "idolatrous, and also curiously at odds with the values of the Revolution" It was suspicious of religious iconographic practices. At the beginning, in 1776, it was not meant to be that at all.

On the 1782 Great Seal of the United States, the date of the Declaration of Independence and the words under it signify the beginning of the "new American Era" on earth. Though the inscription, Novus ordo seclorum, does not translate from the Latin as "secular", it also does not refer to a new order of heaven. It is a reference to generations of society in the western hemisphere, the millions of generations to come.

Even from the vantage point of a new nation only ten to twenty years after the drafting of the Constitution, the Framers themselves differed in their assessments of its significance. Washington in his Farewell Address pleaded that "the Constitution be sacredly maintained". He echoed Madison in Federalist no. 49 that citizen "veneration" of the Constitution might generate the intellectual stability needed to maintain even the "wisest and freest governments" amidst conflicting loyalties. But there is also a rich tradition of dissent from "Constitution worship". By 1816, Jefferson could write that "some men look at constitutions with sanctimonious reverence and deem them like the Ark of the Covenant, too sacred to be touched". But he saw imperfections and imagined that potentially, there could be others, believing as he did that "institutions must advance also".

Regarding the United States Constitution, the position of the Church of Jesus Christ of Latter-day Saints (LDS Church) is that it is a divinely inspired document.

== Making a nation ==
The American identity has an ideological connection to these "Charters of Freedom". Samuel P. Huntington discusses common connections for most peoples in nation-states, a national identity as product of common ethnicity, ancestry and experience, common language, culture and religion. Levinson argues:

It is the fate of the United States, however, to be different from "most peoples", for here national identity is based not on shared Proustian remembrances, but rather on the willed affirmation of what Huntington refers to as the "American creed", a set of overt political commitments that includes an emphasis on individual rights, majority rule, and a constitutional order limiting governmental power.

The creed, according to Huntington, is made up of (a) individual rights, (b) majority rule, and (c) a constitutional order of limited government power. American independence from Britain was not based on cultural difference, but on the adoption of principles found in the Declaration. Whittle Johnson in The Yale Review sees a sort of "covenanting community" of freedom under law, which, "transcending the 'natural' bonds of race, religion and class, itself takes on transcendent importance".

Becoming a naturalized citizen of the United States requires passing a test covering a basic understanding of the Declaration, the U.S. Constitution, and the Bill of Rights, and taking an oath to support the U.S. Constitution. Hans Kohn described the United States Constitution as "unlike any other: it represents the lifeblood of the American nation, its supreme symbol and manifestation. It is so intimately welded with the national existence itself that the two have become inseparable." Indeed, abolishing the Constitution in Huntington's view would abolish the United States, it would "destroy the basis of community, eliminating the nation, [effecting] ... a return to nature".

As if to emphasize the lack of any alternative "faith" to the American nation, Thomas Grey in his article "The Constitution as scripture", contrasted those traditional societies with divinely appointed rulers enjoying heavenly mandates for social cohesion with that of the United States. He pointed out that Article VI, third clause, requires all political figures, both federal and state, "be bound by oath or affirmation to support this Constitution, but no religious test shall ever be required". This was a major break not only with past British practice commingling authority of state and religion, but also with that of most American states when the Constitution was written.

Whatever the oversights and evils the modern reader may see in the original Constitution, the Declaration that "all men are created equal"—in their rights—informed the Constitution in such a way that Frederick Douglass in 1860 could label the Constitution, if properly understood, as an antislavery document. He held that "the constitutionality of slavery can be made out only by disregarding the plain and common-sense reading to the Constitution itself. [T]he Constitution will afford slavery no protection when it shall cease to be administered by slaveholders", a reference to the Supreme Court majority at the time. With a change of that majority, there was American precedent for judicial activism in Constitutional interpretation, including the Massachusetts Supreme Court, which had ended slavery there in 1783.

Accumulations of Amendments under Article V of the Constitution and judicial review of Congressional and state law have fundamentally altered the relationship between U.S. citizens and their governments. Historians such as Eric Foner, in The Second Founding: How the Civil War and Reconstruction Remade the Constitution refer to the coming of a "second Constitution": with the Thirteenth Amendment, all people in the United States are free; the Fourteenth, all Americans are citizens; the Fifteenth, all citizens vote regardless of race; and the Nineteenth, all citizens vote regardless of sex. The Fourteenth Amendment has been interpreted so as to require States to respect citizen rights in the same way that the Constitution has required the Federal government to respect them – so much so, that in 1972, the U.S. representative from Texas, Barbara Jordan, could affirm, "My faith in the Constitution is whole, it is complete, it is total".

After discussion of the Article V provision for change in the Constitution as a political stimulus to serious national consensus building, Sanford Levinson performed a thought experiment which was suggested at the bicentennial celebration of the Constitution in Philadelphia. If one were to sign the Constitution today, whatever our reservations might be, knowing what we do now, and transported back in time to its original shortcomings, great and small, "signing the Constitution commits one not to closure but only to a process of becoming, and to taking responsibility for the political vision toward which I, joined I hope, with others, strive".

== See also ==
- American exceptionalism
- American's Creed
- "And I don't care what it is", Dwight Eisenhower quote from 1952
- Arlington National Cemetery
- Ceremonial deism
- Christian nationalism#United States
- Commemoration of the American Revolution
- Confucian ritual religion
- Constitutionalism
- Gettysburg Address
- Imperial cult
- Independence Hall
- Judeo-Christian ethics
- Liberty Bell
- Lost Cause of the Confederacy
- Moralistic therapeutic deism
- Religious Confucianism
- Republicanism in the United States
- Secular Shrine Theory
- Statolatry
