= Francis Rawle =

English-born American colonist and Quaker

- Born: 1660; England
- Died: March 5, 1727 (aged 66–67); Philadelphia
- Occupations: colonist and member of assembly

Francis Rawle (1660 – 5 March 1727), born in England, was a Quaker and colonist in Philadelphia, where he served in administrative positions and was a member of the assembly.

== Early life ==
Rawle was born in England in 1660, son of Francis Rawle, and came of an old Cornish family of some wealth and standing. At one time, he settled near St Juliot, and later in the neighbourhood of Plymouth. Both father and son were Quakers and followers of George Fox, and were persecuted for their religious belief, being imprisoned together at Exeter in 1683. Because of this they obtained a grant from William Penn, left Plymouth in the ship named Desire, and arrived in Philadelphia on June 23, 1686.

== Colonial America ==
Rawle first settled on 2,500 acres in Plymouth Colony, where he founded a society known as the Plymouth Friends. Subsequently, he moved to Philadelphia. In 1688, he became a justice of the peace and judge of the court of common pleas; under the Charter of 1691 for the City of Philadelphia, he was one of six aldermen of Philadelphia.

In 1692, he became deputy registrar of wills, and in 1694 commissioner of property. He served in the assembly 1704–1708 and 1719–1726, and while a member sat upon most of the important committees of the house, such as that on currency in 1725. On May 6, 1724, he was appointed to the Pennsylvania Provincial Council by Sir William Keith, 4th Baronet.

In 1721, he published Some Remedies proposed for restoring the Sunk Credit of the Province of Pennsylvania, with some Remarks on its Trade. In 1725, he published the "pro-money" Ways and Means for the Inhabitants of Delaware to grow Rich, which was the year after the South Sea Bubble burst.

== Personal life ==
Coat of Arms of Francis Rawle

In 1689, Rawle married Martha Turner, the daughter and heiress of Penn's friend Robert Turner, members of one of the most prominent families in the colony. Together they were the parents of ten children from whom sprang a leading family in the United States. Their ten children were Robert, Francis, William (1694–1741), Joseph, John, Benjamin, Mary, Rebecca, and Elizabeth, and Jane Rawle.

Rawle died in Philadelphia on March 5, 1727.

=== Descendants ===
His grandson, through his son William, Francis Rawle (1729–1761) purchased land and a mansion in Fairmount Park called Laurel Hill, where he resided with his wife Rebecca, whom he married in 1756. Their son, Rawle's great-grandson, was William Rawle (1759–1836), who became one of the most prominent Rawles and served as U.S. District Attorney for Pennsylvania, their daughter, Margaret Rawle, who married Isaac Wharton of the prominent Wharton family, and Anna Rawle, who married John Clifford. After Francis' death in 1761, his widow remarried to Samuel Shoemaker, who later served as Mayor of Philadelphia from 1769 to 1771.

== Published works ==
- Some Remedies proposed for restoring the Sunk Credit of the Province of Pennsylvania, with some Remarks on its Trade, 1721.
- Ways and means for the inhabitants on the Delaware to become rich, published by Benjamin Franklin, 1725.

== See also ==
- Plymouth Meeting, Pennsylvania
- Pennsylvania pound
