= Rawle & Henderson =

American law firm from Philadelphia, Pennsylvania

Rawle & Henderson LLP
- Headquarters: Philadelphia
- No. of offices: 11
- No. of attorneys: 94
- Major practice areas: General practice
- Date founded: 1783
- Founder: William Rawle
- Company type: Limited liability partnership
- Website: rawle.com

Rawle & Henderson LLP is a law firm headquartered in Philadelphia, Pennsylvania. It is the oldest law firm in continuous practice in the United States. The firm is one of the leading practices in the Philadelphia region, notably in admiralty and maritime law.

Originally named "The Rawle Law Offices", Rawle & Henderson was founded in 1783 by William Rawle. He was a great-grandson of Francis Rawle, a Quaker merchant and attorney who came from England to the Province of Pennsylvania in 1686. William Rawle started his law practice as the Rawle Law Offices on September 15, 1783

In 1913, the firm was joined by Joseph W. Henderson and was officially renamed Rawle & Henderson. In 1917, Henderson became a full partner. He also served as the 67th president of the American Bar Association, from 1943 to 1944.
