= Simeon De Witt =

American geographer and surveyor general

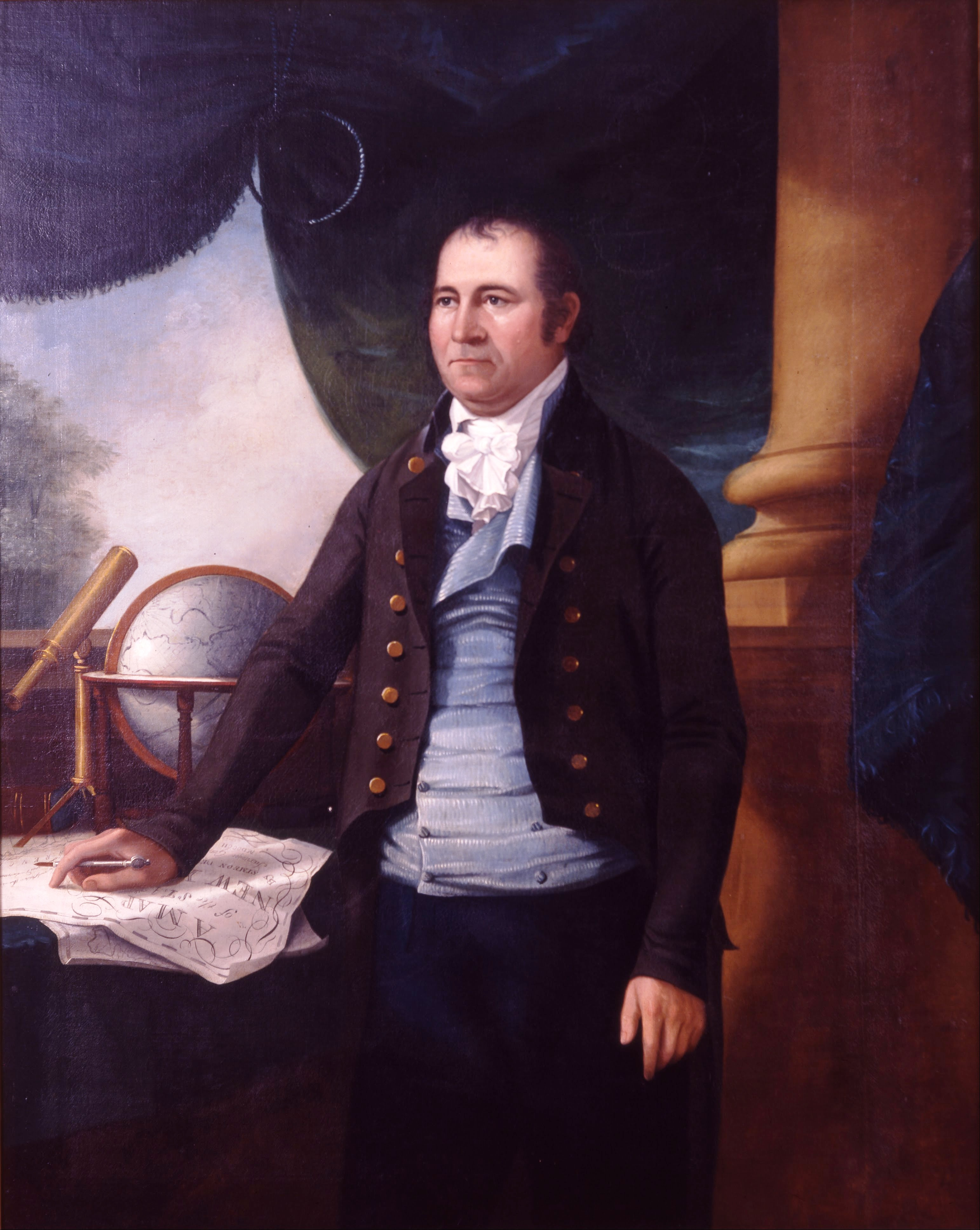
- (1804) by Ezra Ames
- Born: December 25, 1756; Wawarsing, Ulster County, New York
- Died: December 3, 1834 (aged 77); Ithaca, Tompkins County, New York
- Education: Queen's College

Simeon De Witt (December 25, 1756 – December 3, 1834) was Geographer and Surveyor General of the Continental Army during the American Revolution and Surveyor General of the State of New York for the fifty years from 1784 until his death.

== Life and career ==
De Witt was born in Ulster County, New York, one of fourteen children of physician Andries De Witt and Jannetje Vernooy De Witt, both of Dutch ancestry. He was the only graduate in the class of 1776 at Queens College – now Rutgers College of Rutgers University – in New Brunswick, New Jersey. After the capture of New Brunswick by the British during the war, De Witt fled to New York City where he joined the Revolutionary Army.

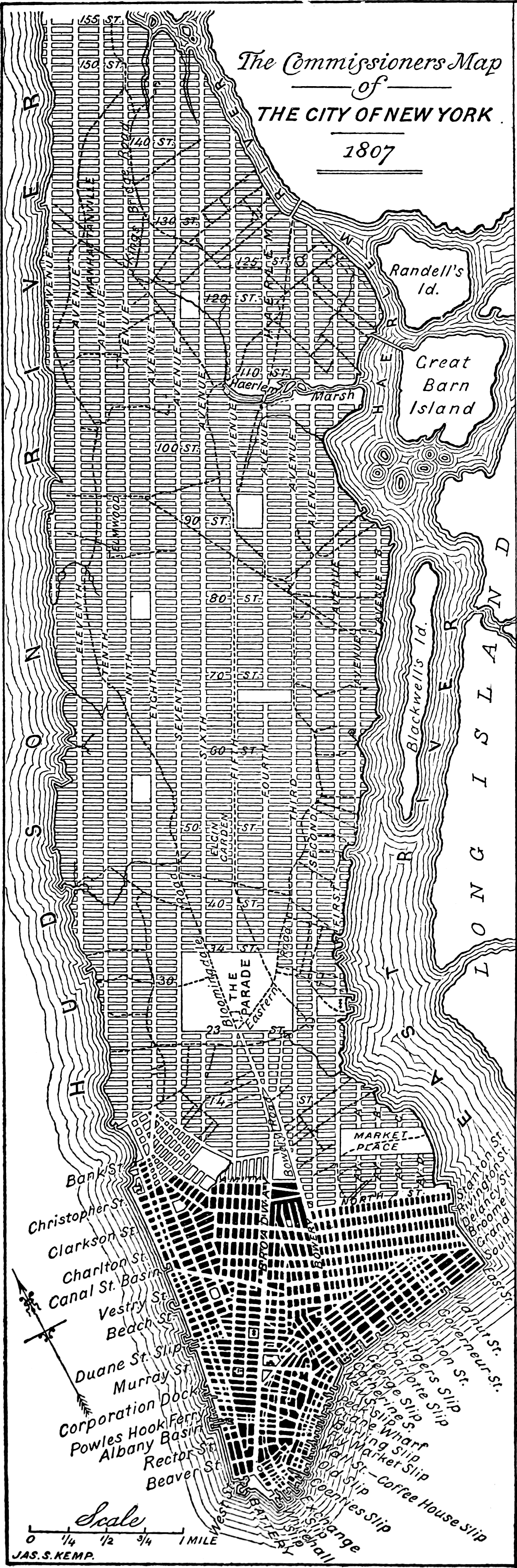
A modern redrawing of the 1807 version of the Commissioners' grid plan for Manhattan, a few years before it was adopted in 1811

In June 1778, having been trained as a surveyor by James Clinton, the husband of De Witt's Aunt Mary, De Witt was appointed as assistant to the Geographer and Surveyor of the Army, Colonel Robert Erskine, and contributed to a number of historically significant maps. After Erskine's death in 1780, De Witt was appointed to his post.

After the American Revolutionary War, De Witt attempted, but failed, to get the Continental Congress interested in a national mapping project.

De Witt was appointed New York State Surveyor General in 1784, New York being one of the few states which had such an office. De Witt died 50 years later still holding that position, having been re-appointed and re-elected several times. Although he was a first cousin of DeWitt Clinton – the most powerful politician in the state, and both the Mayor of New York City and a State Senator – and was a Democratic-Republican, De Witt was never removed from office. Both Federalists and Bucktails recognized his outstanding qualification for the office.

De Witt was elected to the American Philosophical Society in 1787.

In 1796, George Washington favored De Witt to become the Surveyor General of the United States, but De Witt turned down the nomination. Washington wrote to Thomas Jefferson about De Witt "I can assure you, he is extremely modest, sensible, sober, discreet, and deserving of favors. He is esteemed a very good mathematician," but despite this praise, none of De Witt's various proposals gained traction during Jefferson's presidency, and De Witt had nothing to do with the Land Ordinance of 1785, despite what some sources claim.

De Witt was appointed in 1807 by the state legislature, at the request of the New York City Common Council, to a three-man commission which was to determine how the city's future streets would be laid out. Frustrated by opposition from landowners, who wanted to determine for themselves where streets would go as they developed their properties, and interference from various political factions, the Council had called on the state for assistance. The Commission was given "exclusive power to lay out streets, roads, and public squares, of such width, extent, and direction, as to them shall seem most conducive to public good, and to shut up, or direct to be shut up, any streets or parts thereof which have been heretofore laid out... [but] not accepted by the Common Council." The commissioners were authorized to be paid $4 a day for their work (equivalent to $88 in 2025) – although De Witt was the only one who was actually compensated; the other two commissioners, Gouvernor Morris and John Rutherfurd, were rich men and waived their fees. De Witt, however, also wanted additional compensation for the days he spent traveling from his home in Albany to New York City, and for Sundays he was required, because of Commission business, to stay in the city; he was reluctantly given travel payment, but was refused additional payment for his Sundays in New York City.

The result of the work of the commission was the Commissioners' Plan of 1811, which laid out Manhattan's streets above 14th Street – and to a certain extent between 14th and Houston Streets – in a regular rectilinear gridiron pattern, which has garnered both praise and intense criticism ever since it was presented to the public.

Ironically, considering the massive effect on Manhattan of the Commissioners' Plan, De Witt himself did not much like New York City. He never took up residence there, and seems to have held his time there to a minimum.

In addition to his work on New York City, De Witt laid out rectilinear street grids in Albany, New York; Ithaca, New York, of which he is considered one of the founders; and on a number of other developments of state-owned land.

From 1810 to 1816, De Witt was also a member of the first Erie Canal Commission, a project dear to the heart of his cousin, De Witt Clinton. He ordered the making of surveys which would prove essential for the eventual building of the canal.

1802 Map of the State of New York

As well as being Surveyor General of New York, from 1829 until his death in 1834, De Witt was the Chancellor of the University of the State of New York and thus the head of the Board of Regents; he had been a Regent since 1798. The Board of Regents is the governing body for the University of the State of New York – not to be confused with the State University of New York – which regulates many public and private institutions in New York State, licensing, accrediting and setting standards for schools operating in New York State, from pre-kindergarten through professional and graduate school, as well as for the practice of a wide variety of professions.

De Witt was often given credit for giving Classical Greek and Roman names to the twenty-eight central New York Military Tract townships that his office mapped after the war, to be given to veterans in payment for their military service. More recently, credit has been given to his clerk Robert Harpur, apparently a reader of classical literature.

De Witt did not leave much in the way of writings. He wrote a treatise published in 1813 on perspective drawing, and one in 1819 which argued for the establishment of a state agricultural college, and also had some letters published on scientific topics.

=== New York State map ===
In 1802, De Witt produced a detailed map of the state of New York, which was then engraved by Gideon Fairman. The map is said by historian Gerard Koeppel to have been "meticulously drawn" and to have "set a standard for American cartography; it is still considered 'the most important map ever made of the Empire State.'" The map shows New York state to be primarily uninhabited, at least as far as white settler go: the map does not indicate Native American encampments or lodges.

== Personal life ==
De Witt was almost six-foot (1.8 m) tall and was described by his son as having "a noble, serious face, resembling in some respects that of Genl Washington." He was a devout Christian.

De Witt was married three times. In 1789, he married Elizabeth Lynott (1767–1793), the daughter of Thomas and Elizabeth Van Valkenburgh Lynott, and they had two children. In 1799, he married Jane Varick Hardenbergh (d. 1808), the widow of Abraham Hardenbergh (1756–1794), and the sister of Richard Varick, the longtime mayor of New York City. Their son, Richard Varick De Witt, became a prominent civil engineer. Later, Simeon married Susan Linn in October 1810. Linn was the daughter of the theologian William Linn. The Linns were a literary family: Susan wrote fiction and poetry, her brother John Blair Linn was a poet, and her sister, Elizabeth, married Charles Brockden Brown, who wrote novels.

De Witt owned a considerable amount of land in the Finger Lakes area and held four slaves at his residence in Albany, New York, but by 1810 he had freed them, a common practice of the area. They continued to work in his household.

De Witt died in Ithaca after having caught a very bad cold while traveling to his various properties in upstate New York. He was buried on his estate in Ithaca, but his remains were subsequently moved to Albany Rural Cemetery.

== Exhibitions and collections ==
On May 25, 2010, the Smithsonian Institution National Museum of American History exhibited the oldest surviving Anglo-American star map, hand-drawn in 1780 by Simeon De Witt, in its Albert H. Small Documents Gallery. The map shows the stars visible from De Witt's post in New Jersey. Drawing such a map, as De Witt himself later said, fostered an appreciation of "the ever-shifting scenery of the skies and all the gorgeous drapery of heaven." During the Revolutionary War, when cut off from trade with Europe, colonists had to make their own maps; De Witt assisted military geographer and surveyor general Robert Erskine in drawing the maps needed by George Washington. Also on view are De Witt's drawing instruments and examples of European star maps and astrolabes. The exhibition closed on December 5, 2010. An existing online exhibition offers views of the star map and images of objects in the exhibition.

== Portfolio samples ==
The following map sections were drawn by, or under the direction of, Simeon De Witt. The originals were not colored as these are.

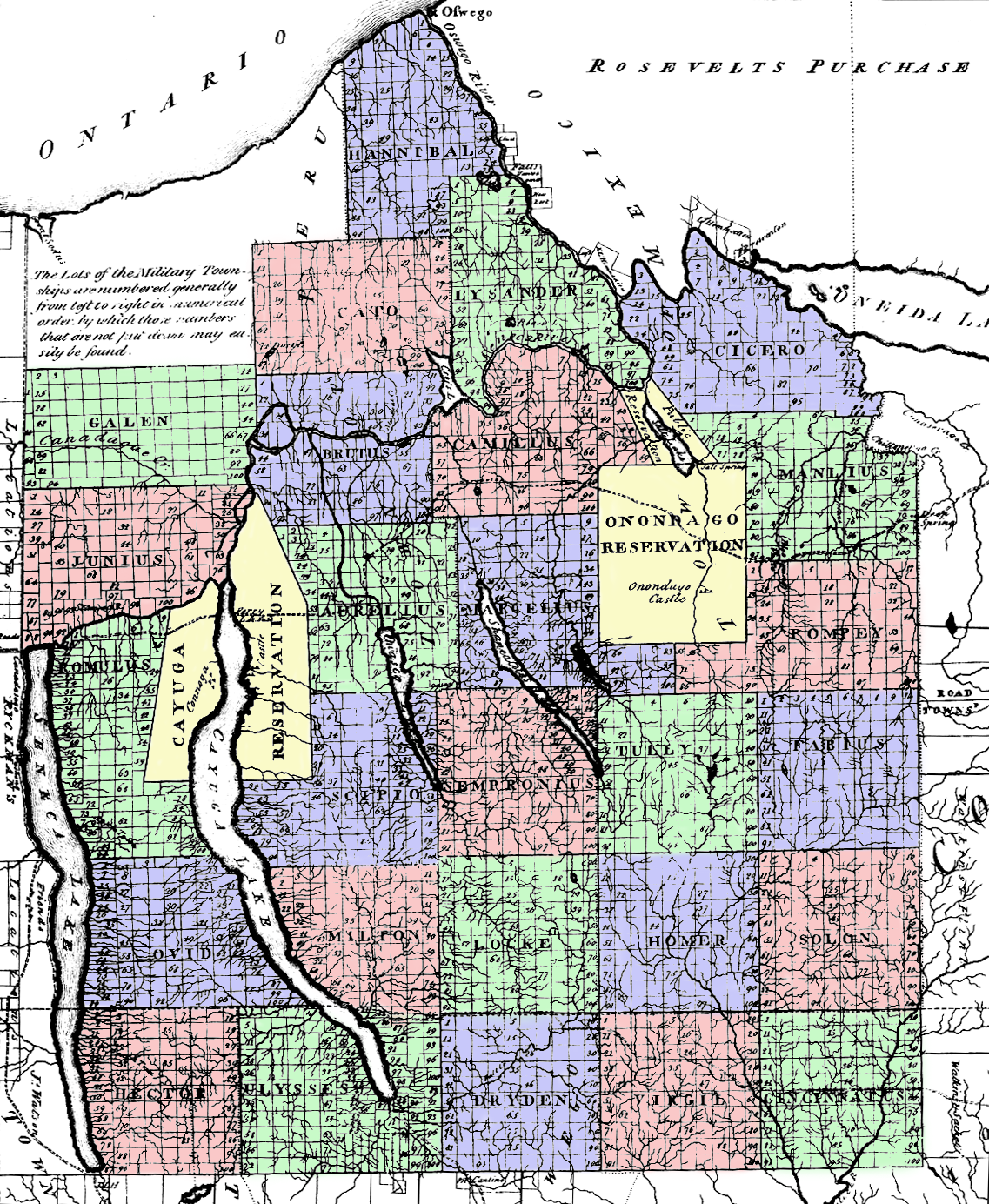
Central New York Military Tract, c. 1792–1793

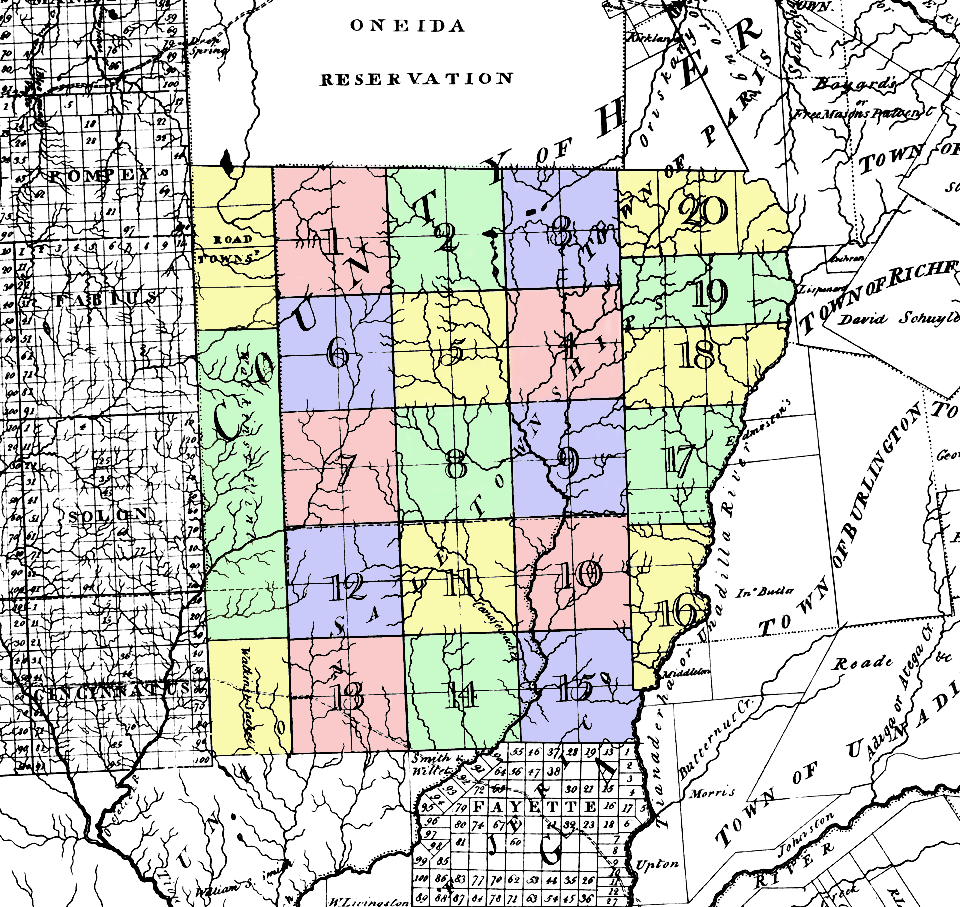
Twenty Townships, c. 1792–1793

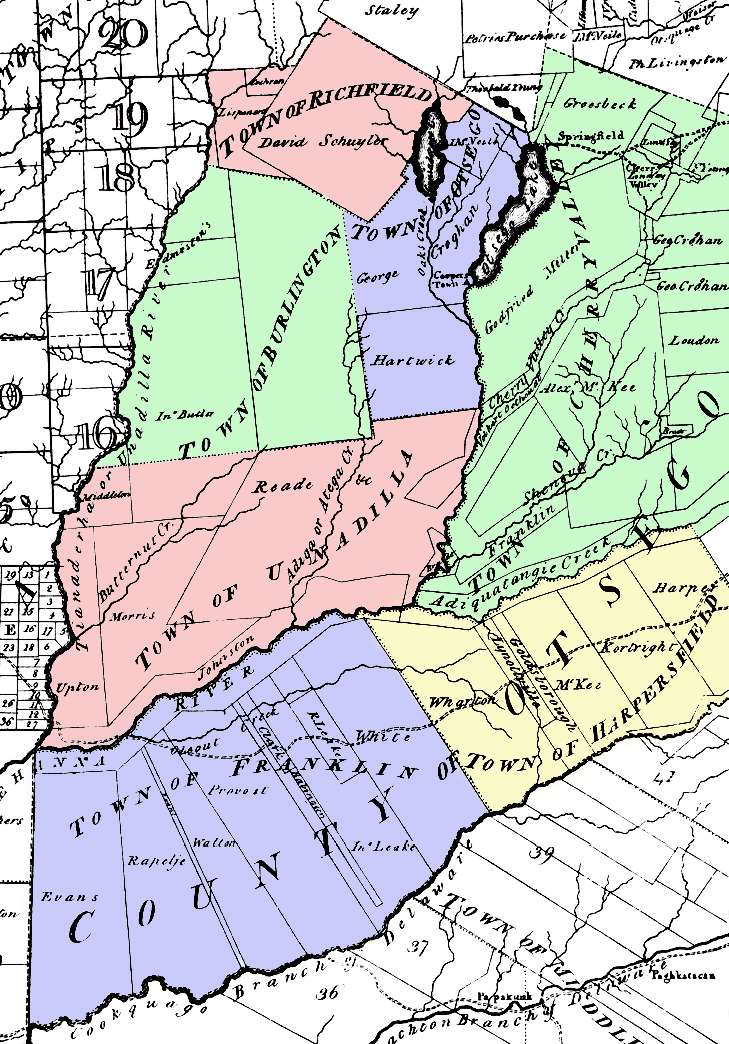
Otsego County, New York, c. 1792–1793

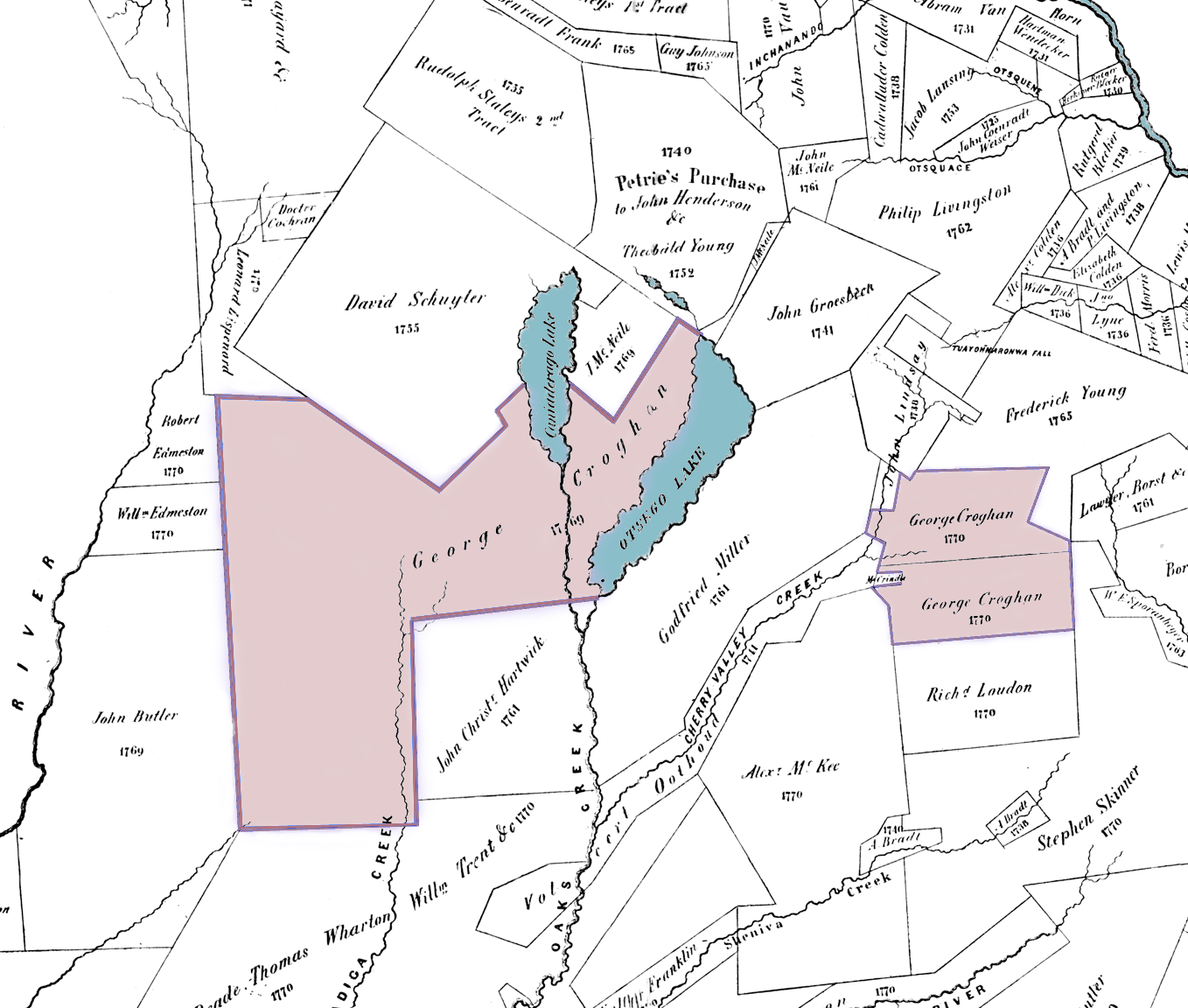
George Croghan's Otsego Patents, c. 1790

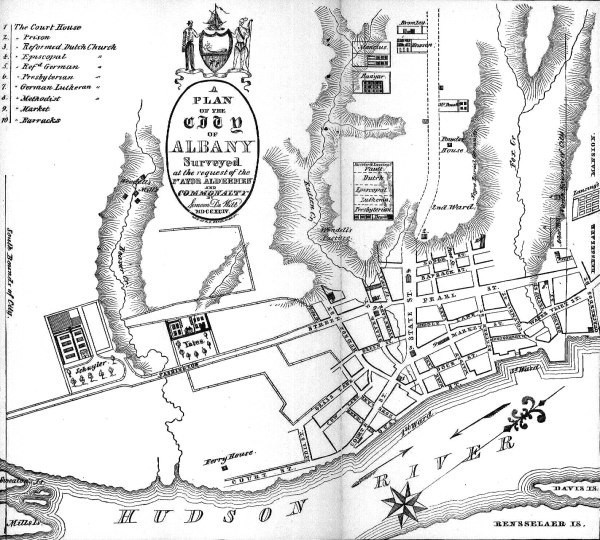
Albany, New York 1790

Political offices
Preceded by Philip Schuyler	New York State Surveyor General; 1784–1834	Succeeded by William Campbell
Academic offices
Preceded by John Tayler	Chancellor of the University of the State of New York; 1829–1834	Succeeded by Stephen Van Rensselaer
