= William Rawle =

United States District Attorney in Pennsylvania (1759-1836)

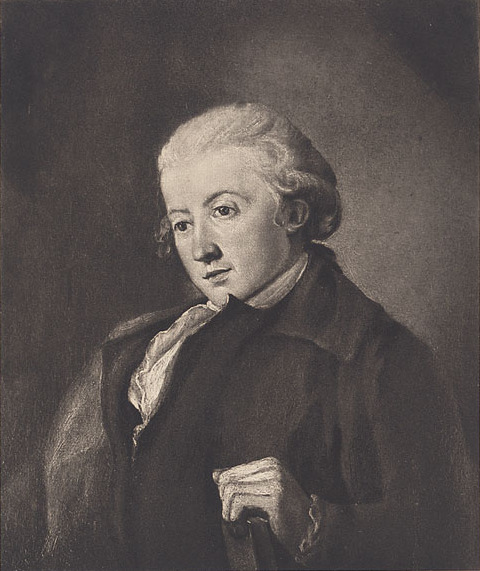

2nd United States Attorney for the District of Pennsylvania
- In office 1791–1800
- Preceded by: William Lewis
- Succeeded by: Jared Ingersoll

Personal details
- Born: April 28, 1759 Philadelphia, Province of Pennsylvania, British America
- Died: April 12, 1836 (aged 76) Philadelphia, Pennsylvania, U.S.
- Relations: Francis Rawle (great-grandfather)
- Children: 12
- Parent(s): Francis Rawle; Rebecca Warner
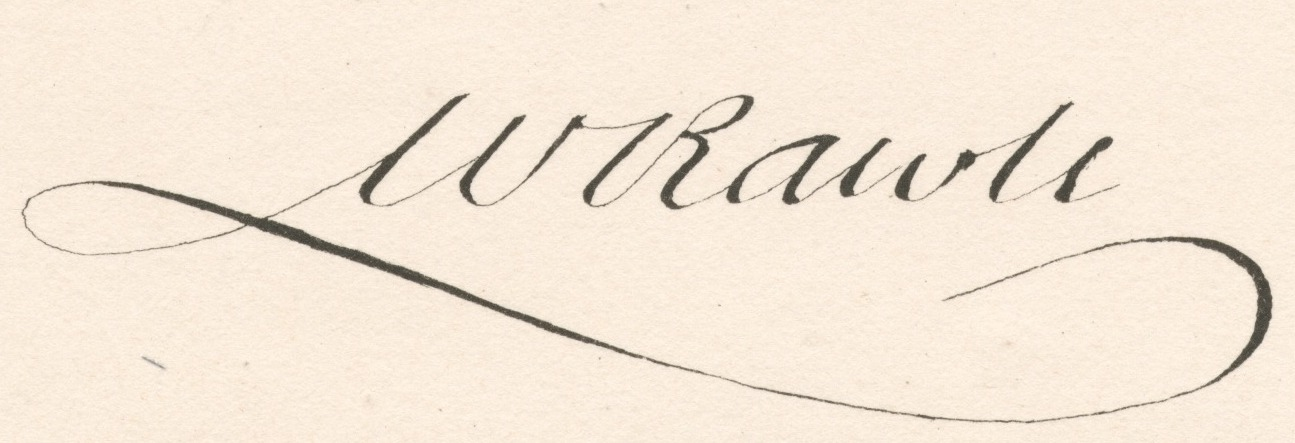
- Signature

William Rawle (April 28, 1759 – April 12, 1836) was an American lawyer from Philadelphia, who served as United States district attorney in Pennsylvania from 1791 to 1800. He founded The Rawle Law Offices in 1783 which evolved into Rawle & Henderson, the oldest law firm in the United States. He was the first chancellor of the Philadelphia bar association and published several influential legal texts including A View of the Constitution of the United States. He was the first to argue for secession in the United States.

He was a Quaker and an abolitionist. He was a founder and president of the Pennsylvania Abolition Society and president of the Maryland Society for the Abolition of Society. He argued before the Supreme Court of the United States in 1805 against the constitutionality of slavery.

He was a civic leader in Philadelphia as a founder and first president of the Historical Society of Pennsylvania, a founder of the Pennsylvania Academy of Fine Arts, board member of the Library Company of Philadelphia, and a trustee of the University of Pennsylvania for forty years.

== Early life and education ==
Rawle was born in on April 28, 1758, in Philadelphia, to Francis Rawle and Rebecca (Warner) Rawle. His father died when William was 2 years old and his stepfather, Samuel Shoemaker, was a British Loyalist and mayor of Philadelphia during the British occupation of the city during the American Revolutionary War. He attended Friends Academy in Philadelphia. Rawle and his family fled to New York when the British abandoned the city in 1778.

He read law in New York under its last Loyalist, Attorney General John T. Kempe, who had succeeded his father, William Kempe. He sailed to Europe in 1781 to continue his legal education and attended the Middle Temple in London at the recommendation of William Eden. His letters at the time show that he was frustrated that equality in England was less than in the United States. He returned to Philadelphia in 1783 and his admission was aided by a hand-written passport from Benjamin Franklin in his role as United States Ambassador to France. He was admitted to the Philadelphia bar in 1783.

== Career ==
He founded The Rawle Law Offices in Philadelphia, Pennsylvania in 1783. It evolved into Rawle & Henderson which is still in existence and the oldest law firm in the United States. In October 1787, he was elected as a Federalist member of the Pennsylvania Assembly and served for one year.

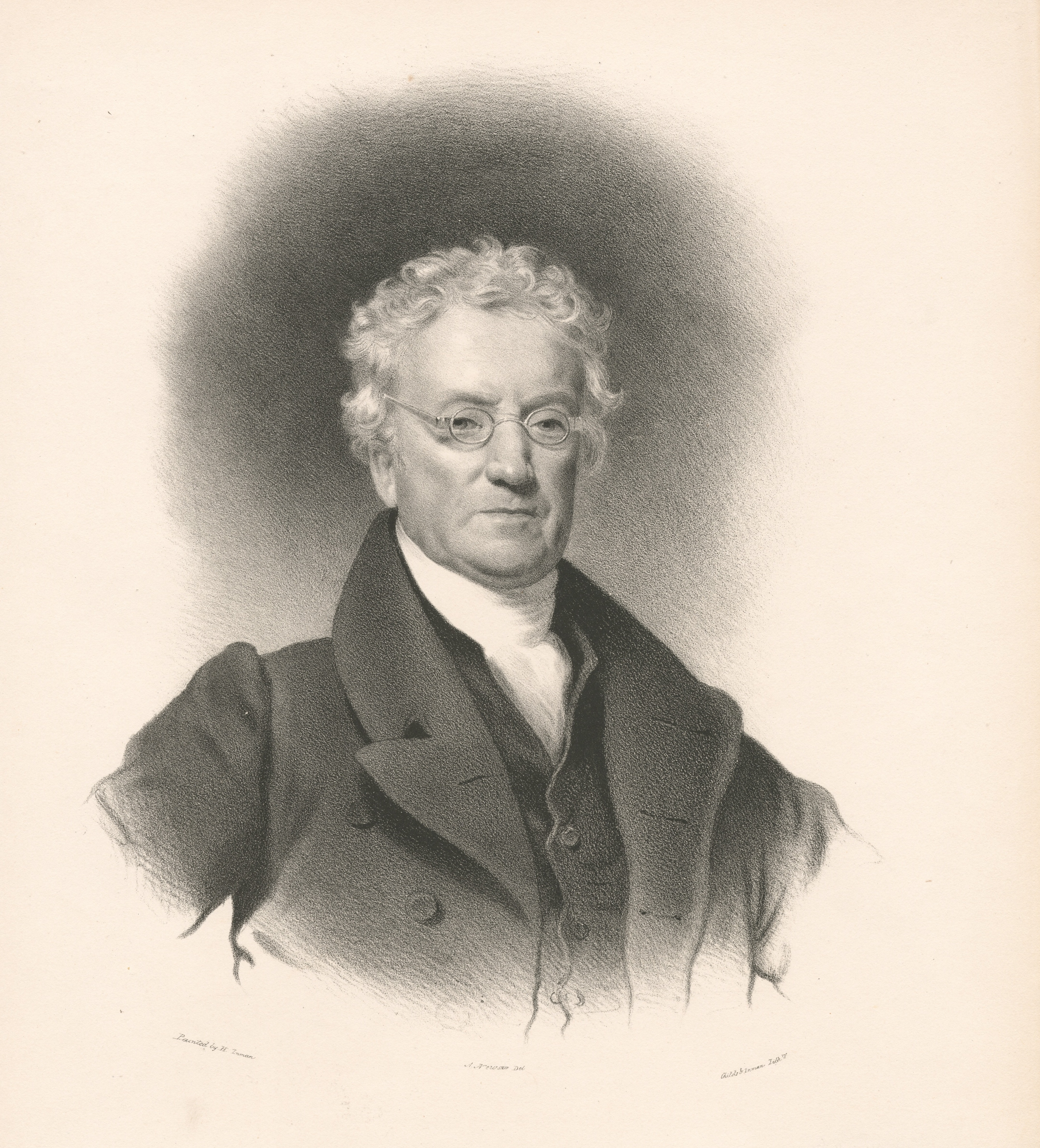
Engraving of Rawle in 1832

In 1791, President Washington appointed him United States district attorney for Pennsylvania. He was offered the position of United States Attorney General by Washington, but declined. He served from 1791 to 1800 and was instrumental in the prosecution of the leaders of the Whiskey Insurrection and the Fries's Rebellion. He was the first chancellor of the Pennsylvania bar association. Although he was a proponent of a strong central government, he was the first to argue for secession in the United States. He served as counsel for the First Bank of the United States and the American Philosophical Society. In 1830, Rawle assisted in revisions to the civil code of Pennsylvania.

== Advocacy and professional affiliations ==
He was interested in science, philanthropy, and education, and was active in groups supporting these areas. He was a founder and first president of the Historical Society of Pennsylvania, a member of the American Philosophical Society, a member of the Board of Directors of the Library Company of Philadelphia, a founder of the Pennsylvania Academy of Fine Arts, and for forty years served as a trustee of the University of Pennsylvania.

He was an abolitionist and a founding member of the Quaker Society that in 1775 advocated for slavery to be abolished. This society became the Pennsylvania Abolition Society and Rawle served as president for the organization and the Maryland Society for the Abolition of Slavery. In 1805, he argued before the United States Supreme Court against the concept that slavery was constitutional.

== Personal life ==
Coat of Arms of William Rawle

In 1783, he was married to Sarah Coates Burge and together they had twelve children. Their son William Rawle Jr., was also a lawyer and married Mary Anna Tilghman, the granddaughter of Chief Justice Benjamin Chew.

His great-grandfather was Francis Rawle, who authored some early pamphlets printed by Benjamin Franklin before he started his own business. Rawle's family were Cornish American members of the Religious Society of Friends (known as "Quakers"), originating in the parish of St Juliot, Cornwall.

In 1844, his 27-acre estate in Philadelphia was purchased by Laurel Hill Cemetery and used as an extension of the cemetery originally named South Laurel Hill.

He received honorary LL.D. degrees from Princeton University in 1827 and Dartmouth College in 1828.

=== Descendants ===
Through his son William, he was the grandfather of attorney William Henry Rawle, who married Mary Binney Cadwalader, whose father was the U.S. representative and judge John Cadwalader. Their daughter, novelist Mary Cadwalader Rawle, was married to Frederic Rhinelander Jones, the brother of the novelist Edith (Jones) Wharton, and their daughter was renowned landscape architect Beatrix Farrand.

== Legacy ==
Rawle died on April 12, 1836, in Philadelphia, Pennsylvania.

Rawle & Henderson law practice named their William Rawle Community Service Award in Rawle's honor.

In 1992, Temple University Beasley School of Law established the Rawle Collection of the law library of Rawle and his descendents from 1783 to 1860. The collection is displayed in the Rawle Reading Room in the Temple Law Library.

== Published works ==
- Vindication of Rev. Mr. Heckewelder's 'History of the Indian Nations' (1818)
- A View of the Constitution of the United States (1825; second edition, 1829)
- A Discourse on the Nature and Study of the Law: Delivered Before the Law Academy of Philadelphia, Philadelphia: P.H. Nicklin and T. Johnson, 1832
- An Address before the Philadelphia Society for Promoting Agriculture: at its Anniversary Meeting, January 19, 1819., Philadelphia: Philadelphia Society for Promoting Agriculture, 1819
- Two Addresses to the Associated Members of the Bar of Philadelphia (1824)
- Biographical Sketch of Sir William Keith
- A Sketch of the Life of Thomas Mifflin
- Essay on Angelic Influences
