= Strettell =

Strettell is a surname. Notable people with this surname include:

- Alma Strettell (1853-1939), British translator
- Dashwood Strettell (1881–1958), British major-general
- John Strettell (1721–1786), English merchant
- Robert Strettell (1693–1762), city councilman and mayor of Philadelphia
