= Susan Linn De Witt =

1778–1824 American poet

- Born: October 30, 1778
- Died: May 5, 1824; Philadelphia
- Spouse: Simeon De Witt
- Father: William Linn
- Relatives: John Blair Linn, Elizabeth Linn Brown

Susan Linn De Witt (October 30, 1778 – May 5, 1824) was an American poet and novelist.

Susan Linn De Witt was born on October 30, 1778, the daughter of Rev. William Linn and Rebecca Blair Linn. Her siblings included poet John Blair Linn and Elizabeth Linn, wife of novelist Charles Brockden Brown. On October 29, 1810, she became the third wife of Simeon De Witt, Surveyor General of the State of New York.

She is the author of a widely praised book-length poem, The Pleasures of Religion (1820), as well as a novel, Justina (1823), about an American heroine educated in London who pressured into marriage but instead pines for another man who is compared to Samuel Johnson.

She is said to have been the author of a now-lost work called Father Rowland, but this may be confusion with Charles Constantine Pise, who also published works called The Pleasures of Religion and Father Rowland.

Susan Linn De Witt died on May 5, 1824 in Philadelphia.

== Bibliography ==
- The Pleasures of Religion: A Poem (New York: Wiley & Halsted, 1820)
- Justina, or The Will: A Domestic Story (New York, Charles Wiley, 1823)
- Letters to Ada: From Her Brother-in-Law (New York: Harper & Brothers, 1834)
