= List of clergy in the American Revolution =

This is a list of clergy in the American Revolution:

- Moses Allen, minister in Midway, Georgia
- James Francis Armstrong, Presbyterian minister in Trenton, New York
- Francis Asbury, one of the first two bishops of the Methodist Episcopal Church in the United States
- Isaac Backus, Baptist preacher
- Nathaniel Bartlett, pastor of the Congregational church of Redding, Connecticut, officiated as military chaplain to Putnam's Division during their encampment in Redding the winter of 1778/79
- Robert Blackwell (1748–1831), minister who served at Valley Forge
- Blackleach Burritt, Presbyterian clergyman in New York
- James Caldwell (clergyman), clergyman in New Jersey
- John Carroll (bishop), Catholic priest in Maryland, later the first Catholic bishop and archbishop in the United States and founder of Georgetown University
- Myles Cooper, Anglican priest in colonial New York
- Manasseh Cutler, American clergyman, a Congress representative and a founder of Ohio University
- Naphtali Daggett, Presbyterian Church pastor
- Jacob Duché, chaplain to the Continental Congress
- George Duffield (minister, born 1732), chaplain to the Continental Congress
- Timothy Dwight IV, Congregationalist minister, and president of Yale College
- William Emerson Sr., minister and grandfather of Ralph Waldo Emerson.
- Israel Evans (chaplain) Chaplin for the Continental Army; considered "Washington's chaplain".
- John Gano, founding pastor of the First Baptist Church in New York City
- Pierre Gibault, Jesuit missionary
- Gideon Hawley, missionary to the Iroquois Indians in Massachusetts
- John Hurt (chaplain) — Reverend who served at Valley Forge
- Samuel Kirkland, Presbyterian missionary among the Oneida and Tuscarora people
- John Larkin (Deacon of Charlestown), First Congregational Church minister in Charlestown, Massachusetts
- William Linn, first Chaplain of the United States House of Representatives
- Samuel Magaw, clergyman and educator from Pennsylvania
- Frederick Valentine Melsheimer, Lutheran clergyman and called the "Father of American Entomology"
- Joseph Montgomery, American Presbyterian minister and a delegate to the Continental Congress from Pennsylvania
- Peter Muhlenberg, clergyman in Pennsylvania
- John Murray (minister), pioneer minister; sometimes recalled as founder of the Universalist denomination in the United States
- Samuel Phillips Payson, ministered for the town of Chelsea, Massachusetts
- Richard Peters (priest), rector of Christ Church in Philadelphia.
- Joseph Roby, minister of Lynn, Massachusetts' Third Parish (now Saugus) Church. A supporter of American independence who marched to Lexington and served on Lynn's Committee of Safety.
- Samuel Seabury, first American Episcopal bishop; second Presiding Bishop of the Episcopal Church, USA; first Bishop of Connecticut
- John Simpson, Presbyterian minister, Fishing Creek Church, Fishing Creek, SC, graduate of Princeton.
- Josiah Smith (clergyman), clergyman in colonial South Carolina who championed the causes of the evangelical style of the Great Awakening and later American independence
- William Smith (Anglican priest), first provost of the University of Pennsylvania
- Elihu Spencer, invited to North Carolina by that colony's provincial congress to convince loyalist congregations to join the patriot cause
- John Witherspoon, signatory of the United States Declaration of Independence as a representative of New Jersey. He was both the only active clergyman and college president to sign the Declaration
- David Zeisberger, Moravian clergyman and missionary among the Native Americans in the Thirteen Colonies
- Rev. Joseph Thaxter Jr., Congregational Minister from Edgartown Federated Church on Martha's Vineyard. Fought in the battle of Concord on the bridge and was injured in the battle at Bunker Hill. 1780–1825. Gave dedication to plaque at Bunker Hill monument.
