= Samuel Shoemaker =

Samuel Shoemaker may refer to:

- Samuel Shoemaker (mayor) (1725–1800), Philadelphia mayor and British Loyalist
- Sam Shoemaker (1893–1963), Episcopalian priest
