= Isaac Jones (mayor) =

Mayor of Philadelphia (1718–1773)

40th Mayor of Philadelphia
- In office October 6, 1767 – October 3, 1769
- Preceded by: John Lawrence
- Succeeded by: Samuel Shoemaker

Personal details
- Born: July 17, 1718
- Died: October 18, 1773 (aged 57)
- Spouse: Frances Strettell
- Children: At least one

Isaac Jones, Esq. (July 17, 1718 – October 18, 1773) was the 40th Mayor of Philadelphia, serving during the British colonial period.

== Early life and family ==
Jones was born on July 17, 1718, to Henry Jones, and was a merchant in his early years. He married Frances Strettell (1717–1782) on February 13, 1742, or 1743. Strettell was the daughter of fellow Philadelphia mayor Robert Strettell. They had at least one son, Robert Strettell Jones. The family were members of the First Baptist Church of Philadelphia, for which Jones served as a lay delegate.

== Career ==
Jones became a common councilman in 1742 for Philadelphia, and became an alderman in 1764. He was elected to its mayorship on October 6, 1767. His election, at the time, upset the Presbyterian community. He was elected again for a second term on October 4, 1768. Concurrent with his city council work, he was a judge for the court of common pleas. From 1768 to 1773, he presided "almost continuously" as the presiding judge.

In 1768, he was elected to a position in the American Philosophical Society. He was also a manager for the Pennsylvania Hospital and Trustee/Treasurer for the College of Philadelphia. His managerial role was not continuous. He was elected in 1752, resigned in 1756, re-elected in 1760, resigned in 1762, and was re-elected in 1764 and continued there until his death on October 18, 1773.
