= Robert Blackwell (1748–1831) =

American minister (1748–1831)

Robert Blackwell (6 May 1748 – 12 February 1831) was an American minister, surgeon who served at Valley Forge.

Born on Long Island to Jacob Francis Blackwell, Blackwell went to the College of New Jersey (now Princeton University) and received an A.B. in 1768. He married Hannah Blackwell (née Bingham), the daughter of William Bingham and granddaughter of John Stamper. Afterwards he began to study for the ministry and was ordained a deacon and later a priest in 1772. Blackwell's first position was as a missionary to Gloucester County, New Jersey which he held from 1772 to 1777. He closed the mission to join the army as a chaplain and surgeon—despite having no medical experience—at Valley Forge for the First Pennsylvania Brigade, until he left in 1780. In 1781, he returned to the ministry as an assistant minister for Christ Church and Saint Peter's Church in Philadelphia. He eventually served as senior assistant minister and rector before retiring in 1811.

Along the way, Blackwell earned an A.M. in 1782 and a D.D. in 1788 from the College of New Jersey and an honorary D.D. in 1788 from the University of Pennsylvania. In 1784, he was elected as a member to the American Philosophical Society. Even after his retirement, he continued to help with parish duties until his death. In his spare time, he served as a trustee of the college and Academy of Philadelphia from 1789 to 1791 and again from 1799 to 1822, after it merged with the University of the State of Pennsylvania to create the University of Pennsylvania.

Blackwell died in 1831. He is buried at Saint Peter's Church in Philadelphia.

== See also ==
- John Hurt (chaplain) — Reverend who also served at Valley Forge
- Israel Evans (chaplain) — Reverend who also served at Valley Forge
- List of clergy in the American Revolution
