= John Gibson (mayor) =

Mayor of Philadelphia (1729–1782)

42nd Mayor of Philadelphia
- In office October 1, 1771 – October 5, 1773
- Preceded by: Samuel Shoemaker
- Succeeded by: William Fisher

Personal details
- Born: November 19, 1729 Colony of Virginia, British Empire
- Died: April 3, 1782 (aged 52) United States
- Spouse: Anna Ball
- Children: At least 1

John Gibson (November 19, 1729 – April 3, 1782) was the 42nd Mayor of Philadelphia during the British administration of the American colonies.

== Early life and family ==
Gibson was born in Virginia, and was sent to Philadelphia by his parents as a youth. He was an Episcopalian and worshiped at St. Peter's Episcopal Church. His early career consisted of merchanting, and temporarily worked for Allen and Turner.

He was married to Anna Ball. Their daughter, Sarah Stomper Gibson (?–1858), married Peter McCall (1773–1809) in 1801; McCall was uncle to the similarly-named Peter McCall who served as Philadelphia's mayor in the 1840s through his brother Archibald.

== Career ==
In 1762, Gibson began his political career by joining the Philadelphia Common Council. On October 6, 1767, he was made an alderman for the city of Philadelphia. He later served as the Mayor of Philadelphia for two terms, from October 1, 1771 to October 5, 1773. He was succeeded by William Fisher. The Continental Congress elected him auditor general in 1776 and renewed his term in 1778.

Outside of his political career, he was also a manager at Pennsylvania Hospital and a member of the American Philosophical Society.
