= Joseph Welles Henderson =

American attorney and academic administrator

President of Bucknell University
- In office 1953–54
- Preceded by: Horace Hildreth
- Succeeded by: Merle Middleton Odgers

Personal details
- Born: February 6, 1890 Montgomery, Pennsylvania
- Died: July 25, 1957 (aged 67)
- Education: Bucknell University; Harvard Law School
- Profession: lawyer

Joseph Welles Henderson (February 6, 1890 – July 25, 1957), born in Montgomery, Pennsylvania, was acting president of Bucknell University from 1953 to 1954.

== Education ==
Henderson received his A.B. and master's degrees from Bucknell, and his law degree from Harvard Law School (1913).

== Career ==
Henderson became a partner in Rawle & Henderson LLP in Philadelphia in 1917 (his fourth year at the firm). He worked in the firm's Admiralty law practice. He was a member of the Board of Philadelphia City Trusts. Henderson was the 67th president of the American Bar Association, from 1943 to 1944, elected by a unanimous vote of the House of Delegates.

In addition to being acting president at Bucknell from 1953 to 1954, Henderson was president of the Union League in 1955 and 1956.
