= Benjamin Shoemaker =

American politician

Benjamin Shoemaker (3 August 1704 in Germantown, Philadelphia – c.1767 in Philadelphia) was a colonial Pennsylvania Quaker, merchant, and politician. He served as mayor of Philadelphia in 1743, 1752, and 1760, and as city treasurer from 1751 to 1767. He also served on the Pennsylvania Provincial Council from 1745 to 1767.

His son Samuel Shoemaker served two terms as mayor.

His father, Isaac Schumacher (1669–1732), was born in Heidelberg, Germany and settled in the Province of Pennsylvania.

Political offices
Preceded by William Till	Mayor of Philadelphia; 1743–1744	Succeeded by Edward Shippen
Preceded by Robert Strettell	Mayor of Philadelphia; 1752–1753	Succeeded by Thomas Lawrence
Preceded by John Stamper	Mayor of Philadelphia; 1760–1761	Succeeded by Jacob Duché, Sr.
