= Israel Evans (chaplain) =

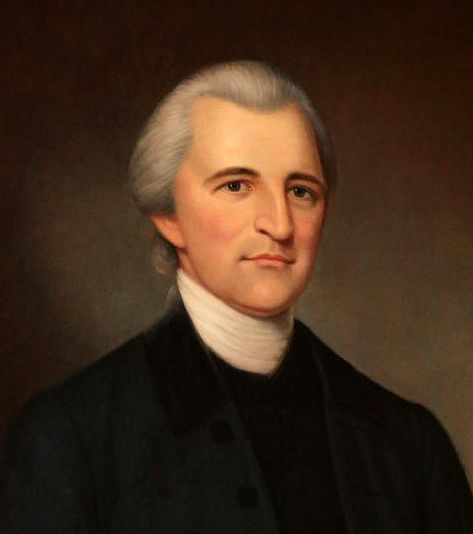
Israel Evans (1747–1807) By Adna Tenney

Israel Evans (1747–1807) was a Presbyterian minister from Pennsylvania who served at Valley Forge and other campaigns during the American Revolutionary War. During this time Evans was the chaplain of General Poor's New Hampshire Brigade of the Continental Army, and then came under the command of Washington at Valley Forge and then Yorktown. Evans served as army chaplain in a number of campaigns for nearly the entire duration of the war, and thereafter, winning the praise of General George Washington and other commanders. Evans is noted for the inspirational sermons he gave on some of the earliest Thanksgiving Day celebrations held during the Revolution.

== Early life ==
Israel Evans was of Welsh descent, born in 1747 in Tredyffrin, Chester County, Pennsylvania, whose ancestors settled in the county's Great Valley in 1701. Evans' father and grandfather were ministers, and his great-grandfather had been a minister in Wales. Evans' father and grandfather founded Great Valley Church in the township.

== Army chaplain ==
Evans was a graduate of Princeton College. He earned his licensed to preach by the First Philadelphia Presbytery in 1775, where he was ordained as chaplain in 1776. He served as the Army chaplain of several New Hampshire and New York regiments and served in the expedition to Quebec in 1775/1776. Thereafter he promptly offered his services as chaplain in the Continental Army in 1776 at Philadelphia. Evans served with General Horatio Gates, after the Capture of Fort Ticonderoga, which was recorded in a letter of August 10, 1776 by Dr. Samuel Kennedy, the brigade surgeon.

Under General Poor's command, Evans was present during the capture of General Burgoyne, at the Battle of Saratoga, in 1777.

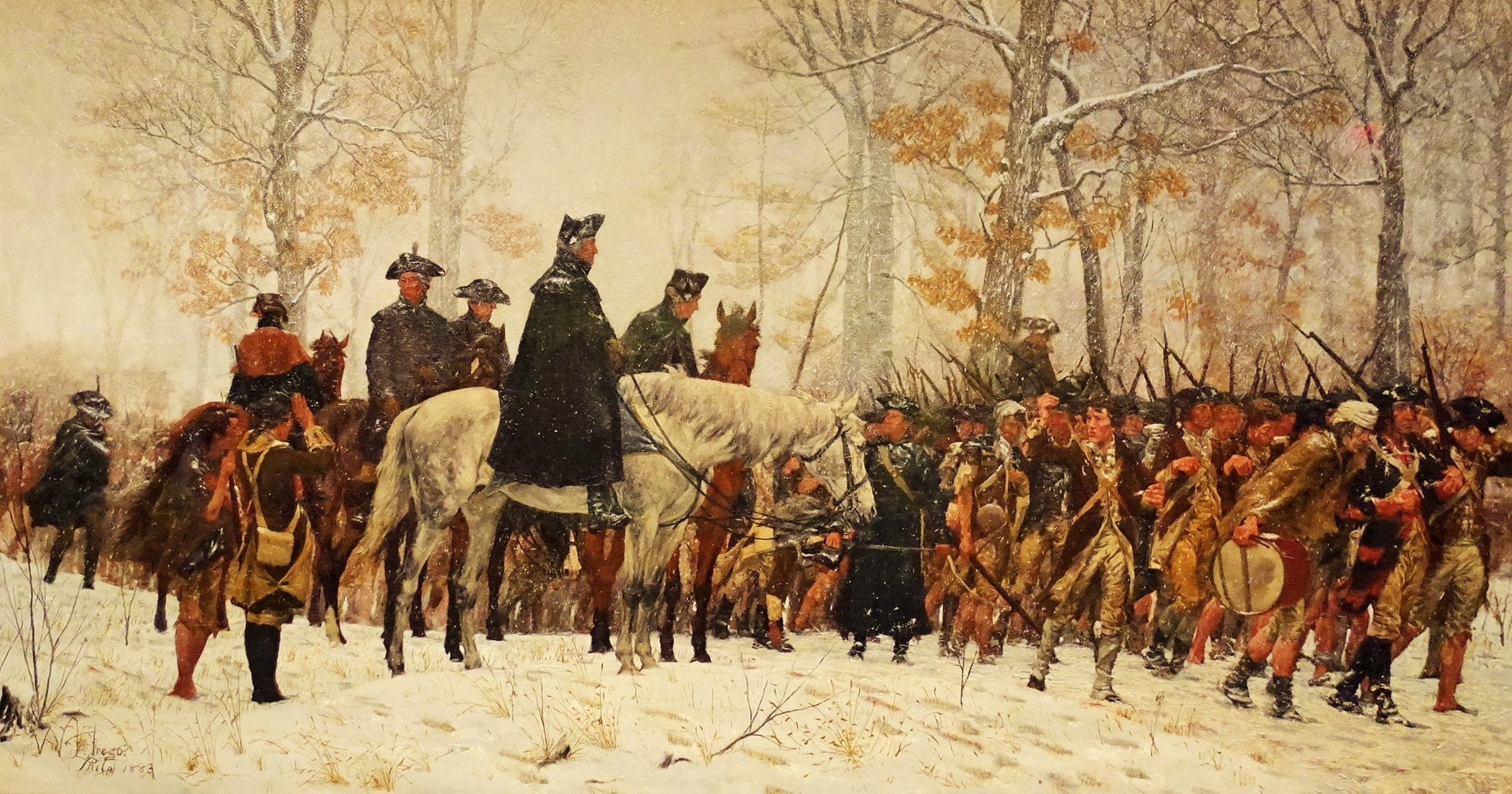
Washington and his troops on the March to Valley Forge

During the march to Valley Forge General Anthony Wayne Introduced Evans to General Enoch Poor and the troops. Poor's regiment stopped and made camp at Gulph Mills, Pennsylvania, in September, 1777, where Evans delivered a Thanksgiving Day sermon to the troops. His sermon was said to have been very moving and brought tears to many of the soldier's eyes. Upon meeting up with General Washington, General Poor and Evans were now serving under the command of Washington. Evans played an important role in inspiring hope to the disenchanted soldiers who soon were enduring the cold and shortage of adequate food and clothing during the winter of 1777-1778.

General Poor, in a formal request to Washington wrote of Evans:

"Mr. Israel Evans has performed as Chaplain to five Continental regiments in my brigade from the first of September last to this time, to the general satisfaction of both officers and men. Therefore I do recommend that he be appointed chaplain to my Brigade."

On Sunday, 10 May 1778, when the weather was more agreeable, Evans conducted a sermon that was attended by General Washington and his wife Martha.

On December 18, 1777, Evans delivered another Thanksgiving Day sermon for the troops at Valley Forge. Washington received a copy of Evans’ Thanksgiving Day sermon on March 12, 1778. The next day, Evans received a letter of commendation from Washington thanking Evans for his sermon and his commitment to the cause of independence and to the troops, pointing out their reliance on "Divine Providence" for their success.

George Washington to Israel Evans
Head Qtrs Valley Forge, Mar. 13th 1778

Reverend Sir,

Your favor of the 17th Ultimo inclosing the discourse which you delivered on the 18th of December—the day set apart for a general thanksgiving—to Genl Poors Brigade, never came to my hands till yesterday.1

I have read this performance with equal attention & pleasure, and at the sametime that I admire, & feel the force of the reasoning which you have displayed through the whole, it is more especially incumbent upon me to thank you for the honorable, but partial mention you have made of my character; & to assure you, that it will ever be the first wish of my heart to aid your pious endeavours to inculcate a due sense of the dependance we ought to place in that allwise & powerful Being on whom alone our success depends; and moreover, to assure you, that with respect & regard I am Revd Sir, Yr Most Obedt Sert

— Go: Washington

Evans served under General John Sullivan during the Sullivan Expedition in New York and Pennsylvania from June to October 1779. On November 17 Evans, then chaplain to General Poor's New Hampshire Brigade, served in five Continental regiments under his command. Evans conducted Thanksgiving services that were held in the German Church of Easton, Pennsylvania.

Evans was again serving under Washington during the Battle of Yorktown in 1781. While the British under General Cornwallis were firing on the Continental Army with musket fire and cannon shot, a cannonball landed in close proximity to Evans, the impact of which tossed up a huge cloud of dust and dirt that came down on him. He exclaimed his alarm to Washington who was standing close by, where Washington said, "You had better carry that ball home and show it to your wife and children." After the surrender of the British during the Yorktown campaign in October, 1781, Evans retired from the army in June 1783.

After the war Evans moved to Concord, New Hampshire, on September 1, 1788. As a noted pastor, he was asked by the church and the community to settle there and serve as their minister. In 1789 Evans became the second "settled" minister of the First Congregational Society in Concord, NH. In 1786, Evans was dismissed to serve as the pastor in a church in Weymouth, Massachusetts.

== Legacy ==
Having served under Generals Washington, Sullivan, Poor and Stark, Evans earned a reputation for distinguished service during his pastoral military career. Most of those who were appointed as chaplains served only for a short time and rarely exceeded what was expected of them in their prescribed routine of duties. Evans' service in the Continental Army, however, lasted for the duration of the war and subsequently he was widely noted for his distinguished service and patriotism, for which General Washington wrote him giving his tanks. Because of his close association to Washington, Evans was often referred to as "Washington's chaplain". Joel T. Headley, clergyman, historian and author, said of Evans: "The one who perhaps stood as prominently in history as a representative chaplain, and who with a clear head, a strong mind, and a patriotic zeal, assisted in sustaining the cause of the colonies, was the Rev. Israel Evans."

Israel Evans died at the age of 60 and is buried at Old North Cemetery, Concord, New Hampshire. A portrait of Evans by Adna Tenney hangs in the New Hampshire State House.

== See also ==
- Robert Blackwell (1748–1831), minister who served at Valley Forge
- John Hurt (chaplain), minister who served at Valley Forge
- John Gano, Minister, patriot, and soldier who served during the American Revolutionary War
- Joseph Montgomery Presbyterian minister; delegate to the Continental Congress from Pennsylvania
- George Duffield (minister, born 1732) — Presbyterian chaplain who served during the Revolutionary War
- List of clergy in the American Revolution
