= John Stamper (mayor) =

Mayor of Philadelphia

John Gibson

35th Mayor of Philadelphia
- In office October 2, 1759 – October 7, 1760
- Preceded by: Thomas Lawrence II
- Succeeded by: Benjamin Shoemaker

Personal details
- Born: England, British Empire
- Died: July 2, 1785 Philadelphia, United States
- Spouse: Hannah
- Relations: Robert Blackwell (grandson-in-law)
- Children: 2
- Occupation: Merchant

John Stamper (died 1785) was the 35th Mayor of Philadelphia.

== Early life and family ==
Stamper was born in England, and had at least one brother, Joseph. He later came to America, and married Hannah Stamper. They had a daughter, Mary (1729–?), who married William Bingham in 1745. Their son, also named William Bingham, served as an American senator from 1795 to 1801. William and Molly's daughter, Hannah, was married to Rev. Dr. Robert Blackwell. Stamper's son, Joseph (1726–?), was married to Sarah Maddox.

In 1761, he had purchased the southern side of Pine St from 2nd to 3rd St from the Penn family, and erected 224 Pine St in 1765. It is named the Stamper-Blackwell-Bingham house and is a respected example of historical brick townhomes in Philadelphia.

== Career ==
Stamper was a member of the Philadelphia common council in starting in 1747 and was later elevated to an Alderman in 1755. He served as Philadelphia's mayor from October 2, 1759, to October 7, 1760. He was a successful merchant outside of his political career.

He died on July 2, 1785, and was buried in the St. Peter's Episcopal Churchyard.
