= William Fisher (mayor) =

Colonial mayor of Philadelphia

Mayor of Philadelphia
- In office October 5, 1773 – October 4, 1774
- Preceded by: John Gibson
- Succeeded by: Samuel Rhoads

Personal details
- Born: 1718 Philadelphia, Province of Pennsylvania, British Empire
- Died: 1787 (aged 68–69) United States
- Spouse: Sarah Coleman (m. 1738)
- Occupation: Merchant

William Fisher III (1718–1787) was the 43rd Mayor of Philadelphia and served during the period of the 13 colonies.

== Early life and family ==
Fisher was born in 1718 to William Fisher, Jr. and Tabitha Janney. Fisher's grandfather of the same name came to the Colony of Pennsylvania from Herefordshire in 1684. He was a Quaker and a merchant in the city of Philadelphia, and married to Sarah Coleman on November 24, 1738. Their son was James C. Fisher.

He was a friend of founding father Henry Laurens.

His grandson William Wharton Fisher, through his father James, owned a mahogany tea table that sold at auction in 2007 for $6,761,000 ($10,767,000 in 2026).

== Career ==
In 1770, he was a manager for the Corporation for the Relief of the Poor. He was a proponent against George Croghan's artificial price control of the fur trade and formally signed a complaint with seven others against the policy.

By 1767, he was a common councilman, and became an alderman on October 2, 1770. He held the office of mayor from October 5, 1773 to October 4, 1774.
