= William Linn (clergyman) =

American Presbyterian minister

The Reverend William Linn
- Portrait by John Wesley Jarvis, c. 1805

Chaplain of the United States House of Representatives President of Rutgers University
- In office 1791–1795
- Preceded by: Jacob Rutsen Hardenbergh
- Succeeded by: Ira Condict

1st Chaplain of the United States House of Representatives
- In office May 1, 1789 – December 10, 1790
- Preceded by: Office established
- Succeeded by: Samuel Blair

Personal details
- Born: February 27, 1752 Shippensburg, Pennsylvania
- Died: January 8, 1808 (aged 55) Albany, New York
- Children: 15, including John Blair Linn
- Education: College of New Jersey (now Princeton; A.B., 1772)
- Profession: Presbyterian minister

William Adolphus Linn (February 27, 1752 – January 8, 1808) was an American Presbyterian minister of the Dutch Reformed Church and the second President of Queen's College (now Rutgers University), serving in a pro tempore capacity from 1791 to 1795. He was a Chaplain in the Continental Army, under General Washington and thereafter one of the first Chaplains of the United States House of Representatives along with Samuel Provoost. (Note: There were two Chaplains of different denominations; one being chosen by the House, and the other by the Senate, both of whom alternated on a semi-weekly basis.) When Thomas Jefferson was running for President of the United States in 1800, Linn was among the most outspoken over Jefferson's indifference with various Biblical scripture. During his lifetime Linn lost two wives and married a third time, collectively producing a large family.

== Early life and family ==
William Adolphus Linn was born on February 27, 1752, on Shippensburg, Pennsylvania. His grandfather and father were both named William, who emigrated from Northern Ireland in 1732 and settled in Chester County, Pennsylvania. Linn was the eldest of a large brood of siblings. Like his father, he took on the responsibilities of managing their farm.

Linn's first wife was Rebecca Blair with whom he had twelve children, five of whom died in infancy. One of their sons, John Blair Linn, became a clergyman in Philadelphia; outlived by William. His second wife was the widowed Catherin Moore, with who he had two children; his third wife was the widowed Mrs. Hanson who gave him one child.

== Ministry ==
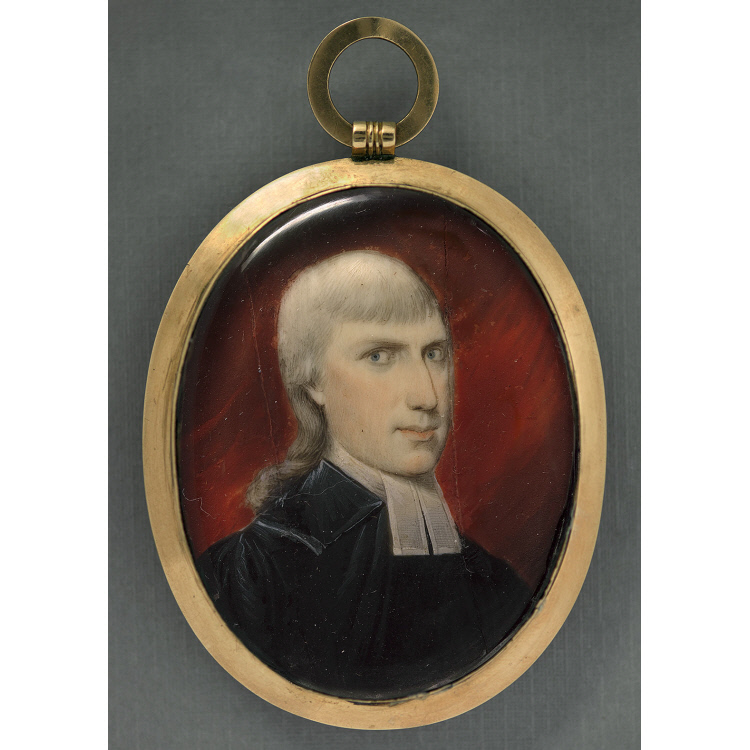
Portrait miniature of Linn as chaplain, by Archibald Robertson, c. 1790–1795

After pursuing a preliminary course under Reverend George Duffield and thereafter in the school of Reverend Robert Smith, (Note: Robert Smith (1732-1793), served as the pastor of at the churches in Pequea and Leacock, Pennsylvania, during which time he founded a school in Pequea, attended by Linn, whose primary function was devoted to the instruction of youth in the Latin, Greek, and Hebrew languages.) Linn graduated from the College of New Jersey (now Princeton University) with a Bachelor of Arts (A.B.) in 1772. He studied divinity under Reverend Dr. Robert Cooper (Note: Reverend Dr. Robert Cooper (1732–(1732-1797) was an influential 18th-century Scotch-Irish Presbyterian minister and educator based in central Pennsylvania. Dr. Cooper was highly respected for his scholarship, patriotism during the American Revolution, and mentorship of future leaders.) of Middle Spring, Pennsylvania, and was ordained by the Donegal Presbytery in 1775. At the beginning of the American Revolutionary War in 1776, Linn served as Chaplain in the Continental Army in the regiment of General William Thompson, under the command of General Washington. Thereafter he was installed as the Pastor at Big Spring Presbyterian Church, Newville, Pennsylvania from 1777–1784. From 1784–1786 he served as the principal at Washington Academy, in Somerset County, Maryland. In 1786 he was installed as the pastor of the Presbyterian Church In Elizabethtown, New Jersey In 1787 Linn was appointed a Trustee of Queen's College. From 1787-1805 he was the associate pastor at the Collegiate Dutch Reformed Church, New York City. After the death of the Reverend Jacob Rutsen Hardenbergh in 1790, the Board of Trustees appointed Linn to serve as President pro tempore of Queen's College]in 1791. During this time, the college fell into financial trouble, and temporarily closed in 1795. Linn served for twenty-one years as a Regent of the University of the State of New York and died in 1808. In 1789, he was elected as the first chaplain of the House of Representatives.

== Exception with Jefferson ==
Linn took exception to the Deist theology that was embraced by various Founding Fathers, especially as it concerned Thomas Jefferson. The 1800 presidential election only served to underscore his anti-Deist views. During the election, Jefferson was sharply criticized by various clergy and others, (Note: John Jay, for example, was outspoken about Jefferson's assumed lack of religious beliefs.) over his religious beliefs, with some contending he was an "infidel", while others accused him of being an outright "atheist". Reverend John Mason contended that Jefferson could be socially convicted for being an infidel based on his own writings, to which Reverend Linn responded. That year Linn published a pamphlet entitled, Serious Considerations on the Election of a President.

Linn's contention with Jefferson was largely prompted by what Jefferson had written in his Notes on the State of Virginia concerning, among other things, the The Great Flood and Noah's Ark. Jefferson had attempted to rebuke the idea that fossilized sea shells found at the top of some of the highest mountains on earth amounted to proof that the earth was once completely covered by water. To this effect Jefferson asserted in his Notes that if all the moisture in the air were condensed and became rain, the sea level would only rise to a minimum of 35 feet, and as such would not, in Jefferson's estimation, cover the entire earth, as held by Biblical scripture. (Note: Genesis, chapters 6 through 9) In Linn's view this contradicted the authority of the Bible and the position of the Church. Linn's subsequent contentions included:

• My objection to his being promoted to the Presidency is founded.
• Public opinion ought to disqualify him. On account of his disbelief.
• I will venture it as my serious opinion, that rather than be instrumental in the election of Mr. Jefferson, it would be more acceptable to God and beneficial to your country, to throw away your votes.
• [Jefferson would] "destroy religion, introduce immorality, and loosen all the bonds of society

== Final years ==
Shortly after the Death of George Washington on December 14, 1799, Reverend Linn authored and delivered an eulogy on February 22, 1800 before the New-York State Society of the Cincinnati. In 1804, Linn, along with DeWitt Clinton, Reverend John Abeel and Samuel Bayard and other associates founded the New York Historical Society.

After Linn's son, John, died of tuberculosis in 1804, at the age of 27, he suffered severe grief and health complications. In 1805, unable to effectively perform his clerical duties, he resigned from his station in New York and moved to Albany, New York with his family.

Shortly before his death, Linn was nominated for the presidency of Union College in Schenectady, New York, living long enough to get inaugurated. After 32 years in the ministry, Linn died in Albany on January 8, 1808, at the age of 55. Reverend John M. Bradford (Note: Rev. John M. Bradford, D.D, (1781-1827) was a Dutch Reformed clergyman, from Hanover, New Jersey, He studied theology with Reverend Ashbel Green.) conducted the funeral service during which he delivered a sermon that included Proverbs 10:7. Following are various definitive excerpts from the eulogy he gave for Linn:

Dr. Linn was early distinguished for genius and eloquence. His Creator bestowed those qualifications which peculiarly fitted him for a public speaker. .. He loved the cause of Christ in which he laboured, and viewed with peculiar delight all extraordinary talents which were devoted to the Church.

== Works ==

Linn's works primarily involved the publication of his sermons and discourses, some of which were published posthumously.

- 1776 — A military discourse, delivered in Carlisle, March the 17th, 1776, to Colonel Irvine's battalion of regulars,
- 1783 — Dissertations moral and critical : On memory and imagination. On dreaming. The theory of language. On fable and romance. On the attachments of kindred. Illustrations on sublimity
- 1791 — The blessings of America; A sermon preached in the Middle Dutch Church, on the fourth of July, 1791
- 1791 — Sermons historical and characteristical
- 1793 — The character of Simon the Sorcerer; A sermon, designed to prove that baptism is not regeneration.
- 1794 — Discourses on the signs of the times
- 1795 — A discourse, delivered on the 26th of November, 1795; Being the day recommended by the governor of the state of New-York to be observed as a day of thanksgiving and prayer, on account of the removal of an epidemic fever, and for other national blessings.
- 1796 — A discourse, delivered at Hackinsack
- 1798 — A discourse on national sins; Delivered May 9, 1798, being the day recommended by the President of the United States to be observed as a day of general fast
- 1800 — A Funeral Eulogy, Occasioned by the Death of General Washington: Delivered February 22nd, 1800, Before the New-York State Society of the Cincinnati
- 1800 — Serious considerations on the election of a president; Addressed to the citizens of the United States
- 1800 — A discourse, delivered April 1st, 1800, in the Brick Presbyterian Church, before the New York Missionary Society,
- 1806 — A collection of the essays on the subject of episcopacy
- 1808 — The character of Simon the Sorcerer: a sermon, designed to prove that baptism is not regeneration.
- 1808 — Sermons historical and characteristical

== See also ==
- Jacob Duché — Anglican clergyman, Chaplain who delivered the opening prayer at the First Continental Congress
- William Tennent Jr. — Chaplain in the Connecticut Militia
- Israel Evans — Chaplain for the Continental Army; widely regarded as "Washington's chaplain".
- John Hurt (chaplain) — First official United States Army Chaplain; served as Minister at Valley Forge
- Samuel Hemphill (reverend) — Controversial Presbyterian minister defended by Benjamin Franklin
- List of clergy in the American Revolution

== Bibliography ==
- Anderson, Philip J. (Winter 1977). "William Linn, 1752-1808: American Revolutionary & Anti-Jeffersonian". Journal of Presbyterian History (1962-1985). 55 (4): 381–394. JSTOR 23327952.
- Freeman, Douglas Southall (1948). George Washington, a biography. Vol. VI. New York: Charles Scribner's Sons.
- Harrison, Richard A. (2014) [1981]. Princetonians, 1769-1775. Princeton University Press. ISBN 9780691615387.
- Jefferson, Thomas (1832). Notes on the state of Virginia. Boston: Lilly and Wait.
- Linn, William (1800). Serious considerations on the election of a president: addressed to the citizens of the United States. 1800. New York: John Furman. pp. 1–36.
- Linn, William (1800). Funeral eulogy, occasioned by the death of General Washington. Delivered February 22d, 1800, before the New-York State Society of the Cincinnati. New York: Isaac Collins.
- Mason, John Mitchell (1849). The complete works of John M. Mason, D.D. Vol. IV. New York: Baker and Scribner.
- Randall, Willard Stern (1993). Thomas Jefferson : a life. New York: H. Holt. ISBN 978-0-0609-7617-0.
- Raven, John Howard, ed. (1916). Catalogue of the Officers and Alumnia of Rutgers College. Trenton, N.J.: State Gazette Publishers Co.
- Ripley, George; Dana, Charles Anderson, eds. (1860). The New American Cyclopaedia: A Popular Dictionary of General Knowledge. D. Appleton. p. 556.
- Sprague, William Buell (1869). Annals of the American Pulpit 1869. Vol. IX. New York: Amos Press.
- Swope, Gilbert Ernest (1898). History of the Big Spring Presbyterian Church, Newville, Pa. : 1737-1898. Newville, Pennsylvania: Times Steam Print. House.
- Vail, Robert William Glenroie (1954). Knickerbocker birthday : a sesqui-centennial history of the New-York Historical Society, 1804-1954. New York: New York Historical Society.

_{Online sources}

- "History of the Chaplaincy". Office of the Chaplain, United States House of Representatives.
- Frusciano, Thomas J. "William Linn, President Pro Tem, 1791-1795". Rutgers University.
- "Linn, William". McClintock and Strong Biblical Cyclopedia.
- "Smith, Robert (2), Dd". McClintock and Strong Biblical Cyclopedia.
- "Linn, William". internet Archive / Open library.
- Blumenthal, Sidney (2016). "How the Heated, Divisive Election of 1800 Was the First Real Test of American Democracy". Smithsonian Magazine.
- "Libraries Catalog; Author: Linn, William, 1752-1808". Texas A&M University Libraries.
- "LINN, William". U.S. House of representatives, Office of the Historian.
