= Laurel Hill Mansion =

Historic house in Pennsylvania, United States

- U.S. National Register of Historic Places
- Philadelphia Register of Historic Places
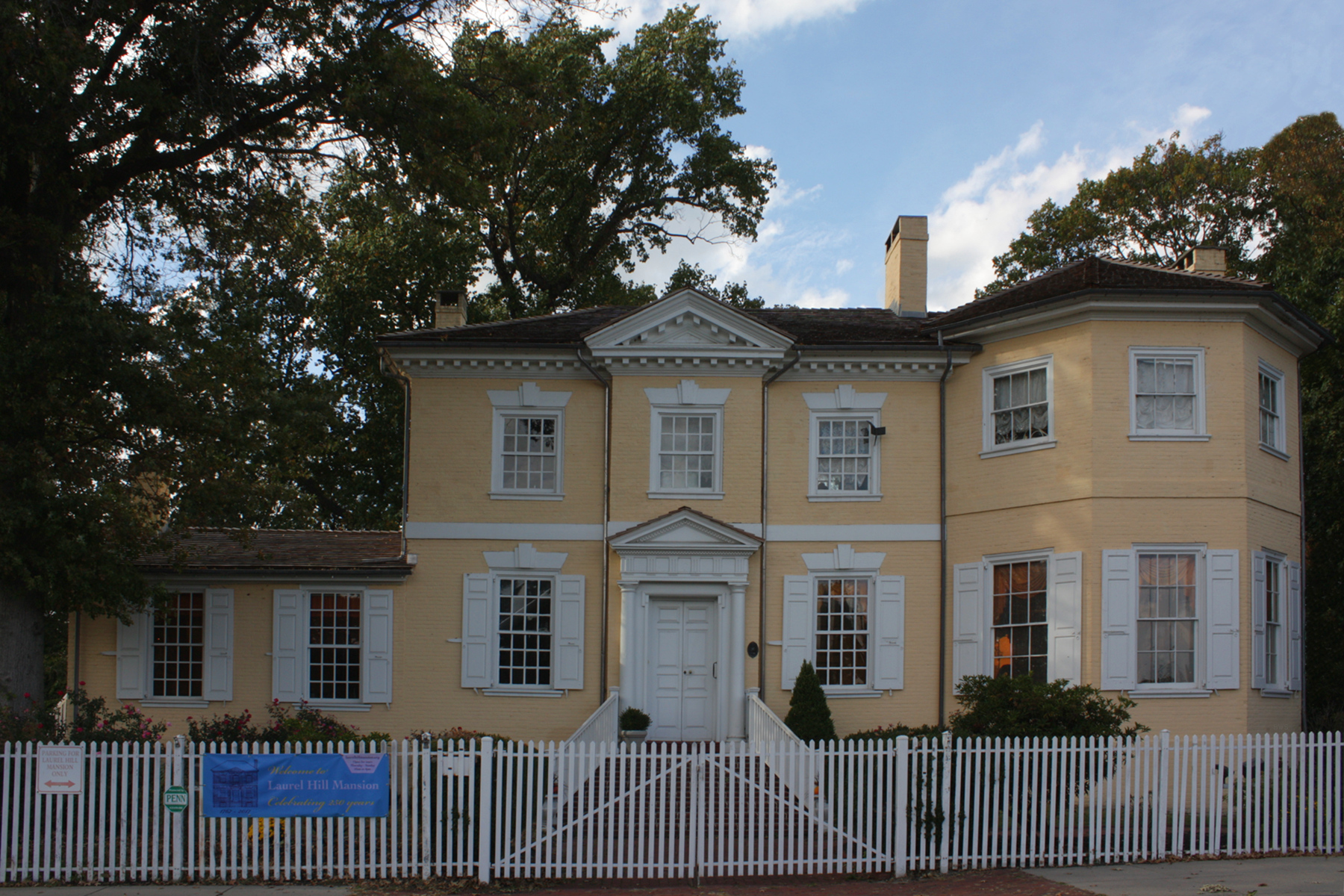
- Randolph House, renamed Laurel Hill Mansion

- Location within Philadelphia Location within Pennsylvania Location within the United States
- Location: East Fairmount Park, Philadelphia, Pennsylvania
- Coordinates: 39°59′29″N 75°11′42″W
- Area: Less than one acre
- Built: c. 1767
- Architectural style: Georgian / Federal
- NRHP reference No.: 72001169

Significant dates
- Added to NRHP: March 24, 1972
- Designated PRHP: June 26, 1956

Laurel Hill Mansion, previously known as Randolph House, is a historic mansion in east Fairmount Park, Philadelphia, Pennsylvania.

The house was added to the National Register of Historic Places on March 24, 1972.

== History ==
There are conflicting histories about the origins of the home. Some sources claim that it was built by Joseph Shute in 1748 after which it was purchased by Francis Rawle for use as his family's summer retreat. Other sources, including the organization that manages the home, state that the land where the house sits was purchased by Francis Rawle in 1760 and, after Rawle was killed in a shooting accident in 1761, his wife, Rebecca, proceeded with plans to build Laurel Hill. Francis and Rebecca had three children together; Anna, William, and Margaret.

Rebecca married Samuel Shoemaker who would later become mayor of Philadelphia. The Shoemakers retained multiple residences including Laurel Hill. Samuel Shoemaker was a British Loyalist and fled to England to avoid arrest. Laurel Hill was seized and sold at auction.

Major James Parr purchased the home and leased it to French Prime Minister, the Chevalier de la Luzern.

Rebecca was able to reclaim the home by 1791. Rebecca died in 1819 and her son, William, inherited the home. William sold the home to Philadelphia surgeon Dr. Philip Syng Physick. Physick's daughter, Sally Randolph, inherited the house upon his death, at which time it became known as the Randolph Mansion, or Randolph House.

The house was renamed Laurel Hill Mansion in 1976 by the City of Philadelphia during the United States Bicentennial.

== Style ==
The central portion of the house was built around 1767 in the Georgian style and expanded in the early 19th century with a one-story addition on the south side. The octagonally-shaped Federal style addition on the north side was built in 1846.

== Present day ==
Laurel Hill Mansion is managed by the nonprofit organization, Women for Greater Philadelphia, Inc. The organization hosts social and fundraising events at the home.

== See also ==
- List of houses in Fairmount Park
- National Register of Historic Places listings in North Philadelphia
