= Rebecca Warner Rawle Shoemaker =

American memorialist

- Born: 1730
- Died: 1819 (aged 88–89)
- Occupation: Journal writer
- Known for: Building the Randolph Mansion
- Spouse(s): Francis Rawle; Samuel Shoemaker
- Children: Three

Rebecca Warner Rawle Shoemaker (1730–1819) was an American woman whose journals provide insight into the issues of her day. She built the Randolph Mansion in Laurel Hill at a time when few women built mansions. The house continues to be occupied.

== Early life ==
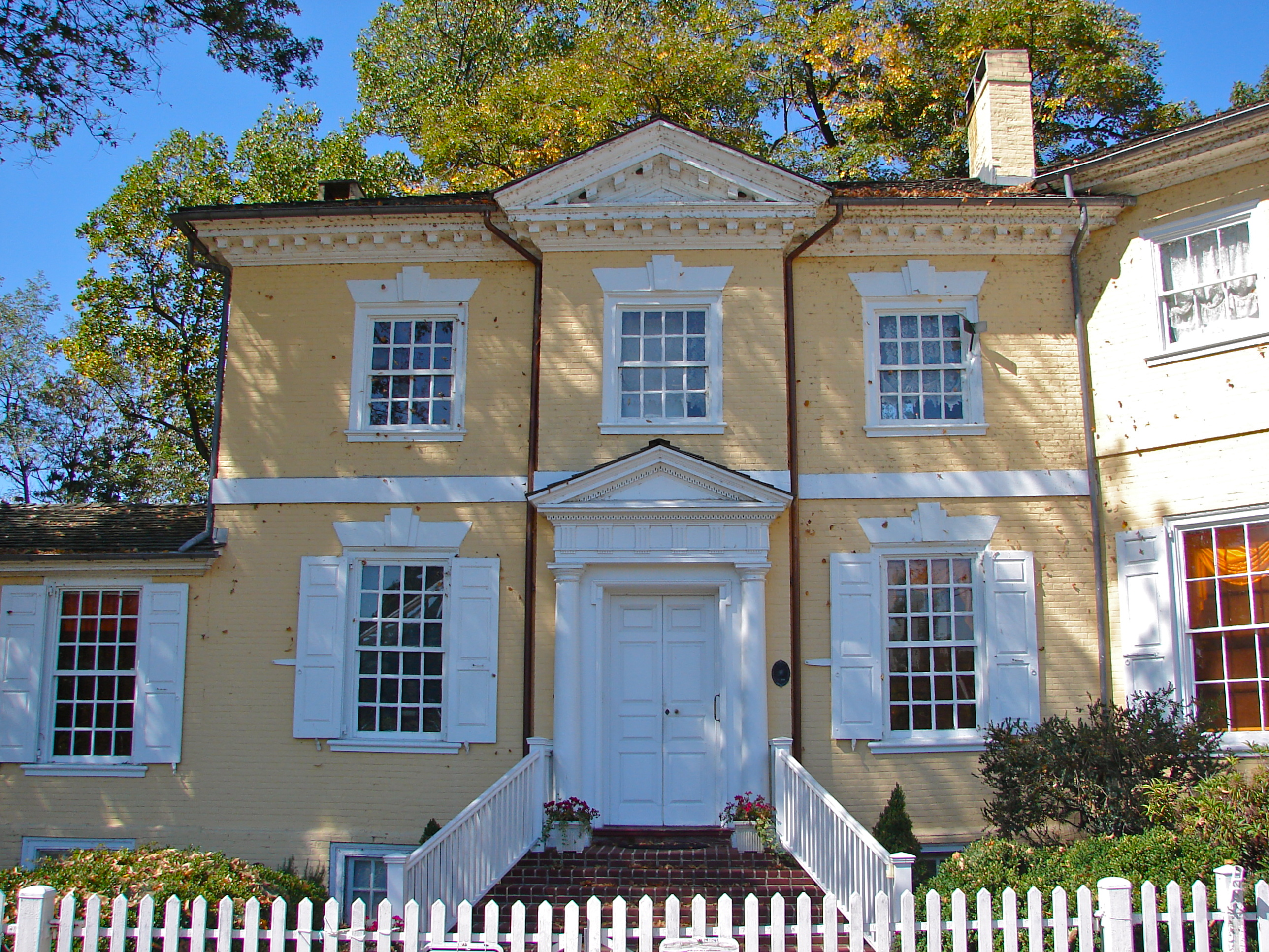
The Randolph mansion

Rebecca Warner Rawle Shoemaker was born and raised in Philadelphia. Her family moved to Philadelphia to follow their Quaker religion, Philadelphia was then the center of Quaker life. Rebecca married Francis Rawle. They lived in what became known as the Randolph Mansion in east Fairmount Park. Rebecca and Rawle had three children, Anna, William, and Margaret, but Rawle died in a shooting accident in 1761. Rebecca then married Samuel Shoemaker. He was born and raised in Philadelphia and would later become mayor of Philadelphia. He would also lead the Loyalist cause against the colonial revolutionaries. After Samuel fled to England to avoid arrest, the family home (called "Laurel Hill") was seized and sold at auction.

The couple split up. Rebecca started to journal her daily life in 1778.

Rebecca was able to reclaim her auctioned mansion by 1791. After Rebecca died in 1819, her son, William, inherited the home. The mansion is on the National Register of Historic Places.

== Journals ==
Marrying Samuel Shoemaker made life hard for her and her family because of his loyalist beliefs. This caused Rebecca to lose her estate during the Revolutionary War. In her journals she documented the financial situation of a loyalist before and after the war. In 1804, she described a six-month stay at her daughter Anna's property.

Her journals are historical evidence of life as a former Quaker woman during peace and war.

== Legacy ==
Her children went on to impact society. William Jr. researched the Gettysburg address. Anna also kept journals, describing her experience as a loyalist.
