= John Hurt (chaplain) =

American Episcopal minister

- Born: 1752; Vanear, Pamplin, Colony of Virginia, British America
- Died: 1824; Prince Edward, Virginia, U.S.
- Occupation: Episcopal Minister
- Writing career
- Period: American Revolutionary War and Early American Republic
- Notable work: The Love of Our Country: A Sermon Preached before the Virginia Troops in New Jersey

Reverend John Hurt (1752 – 1824) was an American Episcopal minister and army chaplain from the Commonwealth of Virginia. He was the first official United States Army Chaplain, having served in the Continental Army. During the American Revolutionary War he served as a Minister at Valley Forge. Captured by the British in Virginia, he spent several months detained in a British prison barge. After the war he returned to his parish in Virginia and resumed his pastoral duties.

== Personal and family life ==
Little is known about Hurt's early life. Many of the records of his birth, early education and marriages were destroyed by Union soldiers near the conclusion of the American Civil War. Some genealogical records place his birth as early as 1738 (six years after George Washington's). However, most historical accounts and genealogical records put it in 1752 (three years before Alexander Hamilton's). This confusion is mostly from the Hurt family's reuse of given names over several generations. Some sources list James Hurt and Jane Bickley as parents, while others claim that Jane Bickley died prior to Hurt's birth and instead list Benjamin Hurt and Anne Newman as parents.

What is known about Hurt's early life is that he came from a long line of devout anglicans. Two of his relatives (probably his uncles), Philemon and William Hurt, were also Anglican ministers before the American War of Independence. After the Continental Army's victory, Anglicans in the United States restructured the church. It was renamed the Episcopal church, due to broken ties with England and, by association, the Church of England. Hurt was ordained as a minister in Trinity Parish on December 21, 1774.

After his extensive military service in the revolution as a chaplain, he married Nellie McTaggart of Virginia in 1785. The exact date is disputed. They had two daughters, Martha Patsy and Sarah Elizabeth Hurt. After his wife's death, he married Sallie Franklin. The date of the marriage is disputed, between 1788 and 1796. They had two sons, James and Samuel Jones Hurt. Much like the accounts of his early life, the historical and genealogical records often conflict on the dates and even years of his marriages and births of his children.

Even the exact time of his death is unclear, but most sources agree he died sometime in 1824 in Prince Edward County, Virginia. In all historical accounts of his chaplaincy, it is made clear that little is known about and few records remain of his personal life, and that it is likely to remain a mystery.

== Military service ==
He began his service in the continental army on October 1, 1776. His experience as a minister qualified him to serve as chaplain to the Virginia 6th Infantry Regiment. George Washington desired that every regiment of continental soldiers be assigned a chaplain, but the continental congress at the time due to financial concerns did not authorize the commission of more chaplains. As a result, John Hurt became chaplain to the 4th and 5th Virginia infantry regiments as well. These units were later consolidated on August 18, 1778, into a brigade commanded by General George Weedon. Hurt would become this brigades chaplain and remain so until the end of his service in 1783.

As an episcopal minister, his method of preaching stood in contrast to ministers of other denominations. One source cites the difference this way, "While the sermons of presbyterians, congregational and baptist chaplains were clearly outlined giving an exegetical giving the context of the verse used, its theological ramifications, and finally, its immediate application in practicalities of the existential situation, sermons extant from Anglican chaplain border more on the style of highly refined homilies, but lacking contextual explanations." As a soldier he has been described as "the bravest of the brave".

He served alongside his fellow Virginia soldiers in the battles of Trenton, Princeton, Brandywine Creek, Germantown, the encampment at Valley Forge, the Battle of Monmouth and the Siege of Charleston. During the Virginia campaign Hurt was used as an intelligence officer for General Baron Von Steuben. He was captured in January 1781 a few months before the battle of Blandford.

=== Capture ===
In 1780 General George Washington had agreed with British commander Sir Henry Clinton that all men of both sides that were designated as chaplains were not to be detained as prisoners of war, but were to be immediately released. Despite this, after Hurt's capture in Northern Virginia, he spent several months detained in a British prison barge off the Atlantic coast. The exact duration and location of his imprisonment are unknown. He was later paroled, as was custom, to the city of Norfolk and later the state of Virginia. However, he was still dissatisfied with the conditions of his parole. There is still extant a letter he wrote in September 1781 directly to Washington requesting his help in canceling his parole, exchanging him for a British chaplain and returning him to active duty. A portion of the letter reads,

"By endeavoring to gain intelligence for the Baron de Steuben last January, I was made a prisoner by a party of Simpcoe's Corps. After suffering the most ignominious treatment at different times onboard different prison Ships about a month ago I had my parole extended from the Town of Norfolk to the State of Virginia there to remain till exchanged or my parole altered. By the information I have had from Col. Tilman with respect to the British Chaplains, I humbly conceive that it is in your Excellency's power to have my parole of honor officially canceled which would add very much to my happiness I conclude also from the above information that I have been unjustly detained and improperly paroled."

General Washington, unfortunately, was unable to help. Washington wrote a response that is housed in the Library of Congress explaining his inability to exchange him but expressed his confusion that he was not being released due to his status as a chaplain.

=== Peacetime ===
Despite his capture, Hurt witnessed some of the most iconic events of the American Revolution. After his seven years of service and the end of the fighting, Hurt returned to his parish in Virginia and ministered to the people there. Records of his peacetime sermons describe Hurt's orations to be particularly eloquent, "theologically sensitive and homiletically alert, he was a good pastor and able preacher. Several of his sermons were printed and circulated by some of his parishioners who were tremendously impressed by the content and structure of the discourse. Each manuscript contained the hallmark of an artisan."

For his service in the revolution, he was awarded 5,000 acres of land in western Virginia in what is today Cumberland County, Kentucky. However, it is believed that he deeded most of this property to his younger relatives soon after acquiring it.

== US Army chaplain ==
After the end of the Revolutionary War, the Continental Army was dissolved. Forming a peacetime government was the primary focus of American political leadership. Uprisings such as Shays' Rebellion and attacks on frontier outposts raised concerns among those of the new federal government in 1791. After a massive defeat given by the Miami Tribe congress was hard-pressed to increase the number of soldiers in its regular army. Accordingly, on March 3, 1791, an act of Congress permitted the formation of a new regiment of infantry in the regular army. The new regiment brought the total number of regiments in the regular US Army to two. The act called for a brigadier general, a quartermaster, and a chaplain to be commissioned.

After receiving authorization from the Senate, George Washington sent a letter to Congress nominating Arthur St. Claire as Brigadier General, Samuel Hodgdon as quartermaster, and John Hurt as the chaplain. These men were instated into their respective positions on March 4, 1791.

As Chaplain of the Army Hurt was to be paid $600 a year, above average for the time.

Hurt was most likely ill and not present during the first major conflict that his men participated in. General St. Claire, who was also the acting Governor of the Northwest Territory, led the defense of the frontier. On September 4, 1791, St. Claire's forces encountered Native forces led by Blue Jacket and Little Turtle. The American force was devastated. Their casualties numbered 657 dead and 271 wounded. This defeat was the worst ever suffered at the hands of Native Americans, dwarfing the American casualties during "Custer's Last Stand".

This defeat prompted congress to further enlarge the army to three regiments. Hurt, however, would remain the army's only chaplain. After the increase in the army's size a new commander was appointed, General Anthony "Mad Anthony" Wayne. John Hurt resigned from his post on September 20, 1794. He was succeeded by Pennsylvania Baptist minister David Jones, who would serve for another six years. It would be Jones, not Hurt that would serve during the army's next major engagement. "Mad Anthony" led a force that defeated Native forces in Fallen Timbers on August 20, 1794. Unfortunately, any records of John Hurt's service during the engagements prior to his resignation were most likely destroyed when the British invaded Washington D.C. during the War of 1812. This stands in contrast to Jones who, unlike hurt, was an avid diarist.

== Historical connections ==
John Hurt has a few remaining historical connections to key American political figures during the late 18th and early 19th centuries. Besides his letters to George Washington during the war, in peacetime, he wrote to both Thomas Jefferson and James Madison on personal matters. These matters, for the most part, involved horses. It is clear from his letter that horses were a passion of Hurt's. One of his letters to James Madison revolved mainly around the recommendation of a horse he thought Madison should buy.

== Legacy ==
Hurt only served for three years as chaplain of the Army. He was succeeded by David Jones, a baptist from Pennsylvania. After the end of Jones' tenure as chaplain of the Army, the post was eliminated. Chaplaincy in the expanding United States Army would be organized in various forms over the rest of the 19th century. Finally, with the National Defense Act of 1920 the Army Chaplain Corp was formally organized into its current form. Although the structure is presently different from the time of John Hurt, his role as the first chaplain of the army has set a precedent of including clergy as an essential part of the United States military efforts.

== Notable sermons ==
American leadership had always been supportive of the chaplains' roles in the army. The chaplain's duties went beyond the ecclesiastical. They included promoting ideas of democracy as essential to a happy society and discouraging sinful behavior while encouraging obedience to officers and loyalty to the army. John Hurt excelled at fulfilling these roles. Few examples of his work exist today, but below are two extant sermons Hurt gave during the revolution.

=== Franco-American Alliance Sermon ===
After the American victory against British General John Burgoyne at Saratoga, New York, American delegates to France were successful in securing an alliance between the two nations. The announcement of this alliance inspired American patriots to continue fighting and the occasion was marked by speeches and other celebrations. Chaplains were instrumental in giving speeches to celebrate the alliance. These speeches promoted patriotism and optimism about the righteousness of their rebellion. John Hurt gave one of the most impassioned speeches on the alliance. An excerpt from one of Hurts speeches is a follows:

"By wisdom of our councils, and the perseverance of our troops, during three campaigns, we have at length received the most manifest tokens of divine approbation; and now, by the alliance of a great and warlike European power, we stand in a situation that bids defiance to our enemies - a situation which affords the fairest prospect - the blessings of peace, liberty, and safety, the end of our warfare. For these ye fought, for these, ye bled -and not in vain! But through form the goodness of our cause the wisdom of our councils, the abilities of our generals, the courage of our troops, the strength of our armies, as well as our foreign alliances, we now have the most reasonable hope of establishing America freedom; yet it is a truth which reason and experience, as well as religion, teach us, that the race is not always to the swift, nor the battle to the strong; that the event of all things is in the hand of God, and more especially the fate of nations is weighed and determined by him."

"And if in the common occurrences of life, it is our wisdom and interest, as well as our duty, to look up to heaven for a blessing on our labors, it certainly becomes a far more indispensable duty on so important an occasion. Presumptuous confidence in our own strength might mostly provoke God to give us up to the tyranny of our enemies; while pious trust in his mercy may be a powerful means to draw down his blessings in our favor. Let us then consider the present duty as a point on which the fate of nations is suspended; and let us, therefore, redouble our diligence, and endeavor to acquire the highest perfection in our several duties, whether religious, civil or military; for the more we do for ourselves the more reason have we to expect the smiles of providence. In the name then of all that is sacred, and in defense of all that is dear to us, let us exert ourselves from the highest to the lowest, to deserve the great and wonderful deliverance with providence hath manifested toward this infant land! ... You, my fellow soldiers, are the hope of our country; to your arms, she looks for defense, and for your health and success, her prayers are incessantly offered. Our God has heard them - the princes of the earth court our friendship - we have a name among nations - victory and triumph attend us; and unless our sins forbid, our warmest wishes shall be most amply completed.

"Let us then join in one general acclamation to celebrate this important event; and while our vices proclaim our joy, let our hearts glow with gratitude to the God of nations, who is able to help us, and whose arm is mighty to save. Thus shall we see, and triumph in the fight, while malice frets, and fumes, and gnaws her chains, AMERICA shall blast her fiercest foes! Out-brave the dismal shocks of bloody war! And in unrivaled pomp resplendid rise, and shine sole empress of the western world!"(May 6, 1778, Valley Forge, Pennsylvania)

=== The Love of Our Country ===
The following excerpt is from one of Hurt's sermons entitled "For the Love of Our Country" and was given to soldiers fighting in the New Jersey Campaign in 1777:

"The name of patriot implies, in its true sense, everything that is most great and godlike among men; it carries in it the idea of a public blessing; it implies a power of doing good, exerted and extended to whole communities, and resembles within its sphere, that universal Providence which protects and supports the world. This is that elevated passion, of all others the most necessary, as well as most becoming, to mankind ... The miseries of the state of nature are so evident, that there is no occasion to display them; every man is sensible that violence, rapine, and slaughter must be continually practiced where no restraints are provided to curb the inordinacy of self-affection. To society, then, we must owe our security from these miseries, and to a wisely-constructed and well-regulated government we must stand indebted for our protection against those who would encroach upon the equal share of liberty which belongs to all, or would molest individuals in the possession of what is fairly appropriated, or justly claimed. And what an unspeakable satisfaction it is to be free, and to be able to call anything one's own. Freedom and security diffuse a cheerfulness over the most uncomfortable regions, and give a value to the most inconsiderable possessions...to be unmindful of the public, is not only an argument of an ungrateful, it is a proof also of a dishonest temper of mind.

"God has assigned each of us our station, and a part which we are obliged to discharge in carrying on the great work of social happiness. If then, I neglect the part appointed me, I am highly unjust; because I take a share of the benefits of society, and yet leave the burden to be borne by others. A greater injustice than this can scarcely be conceived...The public good is, as it were, a common bank, in which every individual has his respective share; and, consequently, whatever damage that sustains, the individuals unavoidably partake of the calamity. If liberty is destroyed, no particular member can escape the chains; if the credit of the associated body sink, his fortune sinks with it; if the sons of violence prevail, and plunder the public stock, his part cannot be rescued from the spoil...But still, the more noble motive to a generous soul is that which springs from a benevolent desire of diffusing the joys of life to all around him. There is nothing, he thinks, so desirable as to be the instrument of doing good; and the further it is extended, the greater is the delight, and the more glorious his character...The liberty we contend for is not the license of a few to tyrannize over multitudes, but equal freedom to all, so far as is consistent with the present circumstances of our country, good order, the constitution, and peace of government.

"These are circumstances which give a sanction to patriotism and not only justify but demand our most active resolutions to promote the welfare of our country by all those methods which become a civilized and numerous people, born with an instinctive love of liberty...If the love of your country is indeed the governing principle of your soul, you will give up every inclination which is incompatible with it; nor will you cherish in your hearts any rivals of the favorite passion. All the train of darling vices must, therefore, be brought forth, and offered up as victims on the altars of liberty...National affection, therefore, if it be derived from a true principle, must necessarily inspire a moral conduct, must incline us to quit every baneful vice, to contract the circle even of what we call innocent amusements, and, instead of looking out for daily parties of pleasure, it will prompt us rather make a constant festival of human kindness, the most delicious of all entertainments to a generous mind. If we behave thus, then we are patriots indeed."

== See also ==
- Robert Blackwell (1748–1831) — Reverend who also served at Valley Forge
- Israel Evans (chaplain) — Reverend who also served During the American Revolutionary War
- List of clergy in the American Revolution
