= Robert Strettell =

Irish-born mayor of Philadelphia, Pennsylvania

32nd Mayor of Philadelphia
- In office October 1, 1751 – October 3, 1752

Personal details
- Born: 1693 Dublin, Kingdom of Ireland
- Died: 1762 (aged 68-69)
- Relations: Isaac Jones (son-in-law)
- Children: At least two, including John Strettell

Robert Strettell (1693–1762) was a city councilman and mayor of Philadelphia.

He was born in Dublin, Ireland, in 1693, the son of Amos Strettell and moved to London shortly thereafter. In 1736 he came with his family to Philadelphia, where he worked as a merchant. He was a member of the Common Council of the City of Philadelphia, a member of the Governor's Council, and Mayor of Philadelphia. Strettell was a trustee of the Academy and College of Philadelphia (now the University of Pennsylvania) from 1749 to 1762. He died in 1762. The London commission merchant John Strettell was his son. Through his daughter, Frances, he was the father-in-law of fellow Philadelphian mayor Isaac Jones.

Preceded by William Plumsted	Mayor of Philadelphia; 1751–1752	Succeeded by Benjamin Shoemaker
