= Samuel Shoemaker (mayor) =

American politician

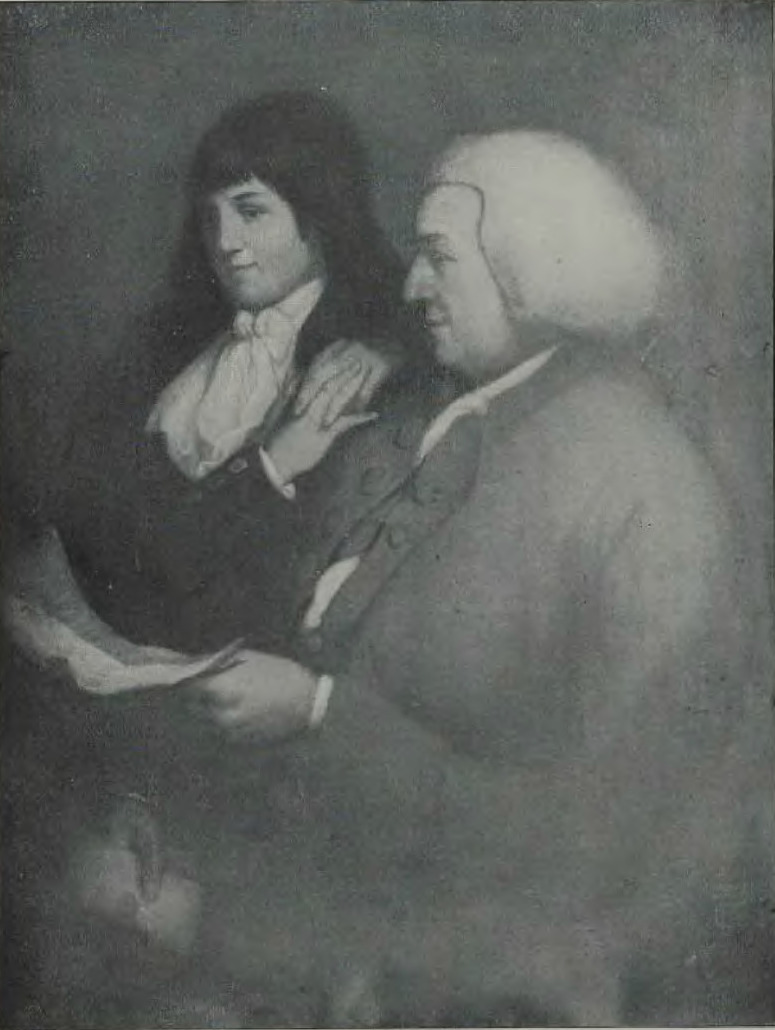
- Samuel Shoemaker and son Edward Shoemaker, portrait by Thomas Spence Duché

Mayor of Philadelphia
- In office October 3, 1769 – October 1, 1771
- Preceded by: Isaac Jones
- Succeeded by: John Gibson

Personal details
- Born: 1725 Philadelphia, Province of Pennsylvania, British America
- Died: October 10, 1800 (aged 74–75) Philadelphia, Pennsylvania, U.S.
- Spouse(s): Hannah Carpenter; Rebecca Rawle
- Children: 11
- Relatives: Benjamin Shoemaker (father)

Samuel Shoemaker (1725-October 10, 1800) was an American merchant and politician in Philadelphia. He was the mayor of Philadelphia from 1769 to 1771 and served in various positions in the city including councilman, member of the Provincial Assembly, Justice of the Peace and treasurer from 1755 to 1778. Shoemaker was a committed British loyalist during the American Revolution.

== Biography ==
Shoemaker was born in 1725 in Philadelphia. His parents were Benjamin Shoemaker and Sarah Coates. Benjamin was politically active in Philadelphia, serving three times as the city's major, between 1743 and 1760. The Shoemaker family was descended from a German family from Cresheim in Germany.

Early in his career, Shoemaker was an attorney with the Pennsylvania Land Company in London. he was also a founder of Pennsylvania Hospital, the first hospital in the United States. In 1755, was elected as a common councilman and in 1766 was elected to the Board of Aldermen. In 1767, he became the city treasurer, taking over from his father. Shoemaker was elected as mayor on October 3, 1769, and was re-elected the following year. After his term as mayor, he joined the Pennsylvania Provincial Assembly in 1771. He was elected as a member to the American Philosophical Society in 1769.

Shoemaker was a loyalist during the American Revolution. In 1777, he was arrested but was not deported to Virginia when he promised to confine himself to his house and not communicate with the British. After the capture of Philadelphia by the British Army in late 1777, Shoemaker served as a justice under the occupation. In June 1778, British General Henry Clinton took over command and ordered his troops to abandon Philadelphia and reinforce New York City after the British defeat at the Battle of Saratoga. Shoemaker and other loyalists accompanied the army north. In New York, Shoemaker reportedly helped obtain the release of some American prisoners in the city with the help of his relationships.

The Treaty of Paris ended the American Revolution in September 1783 and, in November of that year, the British Army withdrew from New York. Shoemaker and his son Edward sailed for England with the British. Because of his loyalism, Shoemaker was considered to have committed treason and, as a result, much of his property was seized by the American government in 1783 and sold. The conclusion of the peace treaties preserved the remainder of his property. While in England, he became friends with Benjamin West, a Pennsylvania-born artist known for his scenes including, The Death of Nelson. Shoemaker's diary recorded a meeting with King George III that West arranged.

In 1789, Shoemaker returned to Pennsylvania. On October 10, 1800, Shoemaker died in Philadelphia.

== Personal life and family ==
Shoemaker married Hannah Carpenter in 1746. They had 11 children together before her death in 1766. In 1767, he married Rebecca Rawle, the widow of Francis Rawle and had a son, Edward, and a daughter, Ann. Their home, now known as Laurel Hill Mansion still stands in east Fairmount Park and is on the National Register of Historic Places.

Political offices
Preceded by Isaac Jones	Mayor of Philadelphia; 1769–1771	Succeeded by John Gibson
