= Joseph Montgomery =

American politician

Joseph Montgomery (1733–1794) was an American Presbyterian minister and a delegate to the Continental Congress from Pennsylvania.

== Early life and education ==
Joseph was born near Harrisburg, Pennsylvania on October 3, 1733. The area at that time was part of Lancaster County.

His parents, John and Martha (Finley) Montgomery, had immigrated from Ireland. One known sibling is "Nancy" Agnes Montgomery (Mrs. Alexander McCorkle) who is buried Thyatira Presbyterian Church Cemetery, Rowan County, N.C., and whose son, a nephew of Joseph Montgomery, was also a noted Presbyterian divine: Dr Samuel Eusebius McCorkle (Princeton baccalaureate, Dickinson College Doctorate of Divinity). Montgomery was on his mother's side related to 1761-1766 Princeton President, Samuel Finley (1715–66).

Joseph Montgomery attended the College of New Jersey (now Princeton University) and graduated in 1755. After a brief time as a school master, he began the study of theology. In 1760 he earned an A.M. degree from the College of Philadelphia (now part of the University of Pennsylvania) and began a ministerial career, serving at several churches in Pennsylvania.

== Career ==
In 1769 he was made pastor of a congregation in New Castle, Delaware, and continued there until 1777, when he joined the 1st Maryland Regiment of the Continental Army as a chaplain. He served with Colonel William Smallwood's unit for two years and was in major actions at Brandywine, Germantown, and Monmouth, as well as the winter at Valley Forge.

During his service, his wife (Elizabeth Reed) and two young daughters made their home with his relatives back at Paxtang (Harrisburg), and he returned there when discharged at the end of 1778. He was sent as one of the Pennsylvania delegates to the Continental Congress on November 23, 1780, and served there until 1782. In 1782 and 1783 he was elected to the State Assembly. In February 1783 he also served on a commission to settle title disputes arising from Connecticut and Pennsylvania grants near Wyoming, Pennsylvania.

When Dauphin County was organised in 1785, he became a judge in its court of common pleas, as well as the recorder of deeds and register of wills. He held these positions until his death.

== Private life ==
On 11 July 1770 he married Rachel Rush, a sister of Dr. Benjamin Rush. Rachel Rush (widow of Angus Boyce) Montgomery was born 18 October 1741 and died 28 July 1798 in Harrisburg, PA. John Montgomery was born in 1771 to Rachel Rush and Joseph Montgomery. In his later years he made his home with his daughter, Elizabeth Montgomery Laird, and her family in Harrisburg, Pennsylvania. When he died in Harrisburg on October 14, 1794, he was buried in their family plot in the Lutheran Church Cemetery.

== Sources ==
- Biography by John Montgomery Forster, privately printed 1879 Harrisburg, Pennsylvania
- Old McCorkle-Huie records, Northern Ireland to Pennsylvania to North Carolina to Tennessee, now in possession of Marsha Cope Huie
