= Nova Constellatio =

First coin struck under federal authority of the United States

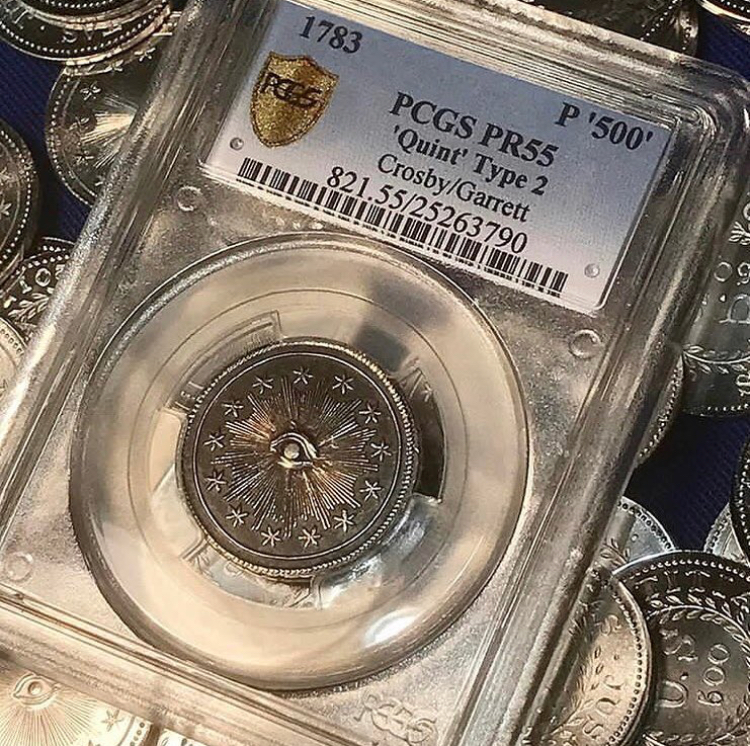
500-Unit Nova Constellatio coin encased in a PCGS coin slab

The Nova Constellatio (Latin: [nɔvɑ kɔnstɛllɑtsiɔ], New Constellation) coins are the first coins struck under the authority of the United States. These pattern coins were struck in early 1783, and are known in three silver denominations (1,000-Units, 500-Units, 100-Units), and one copper denomination (5-Units). All known examples bear the legend "NOVA CONSTELLATIO" with the exception of a unique silver 500-Unit piece.

== History ==
The Nova Constellatio patterns were the culmination of two years of work on the part of Robert Morris, the Founding Father credited with financing the Revolutionary War. Morris was unanimously elected the Nation’s first Superintendent of Finance in 1781; on February 21 of the following year, Congress passed the following resolution:

That Congress approve of the establishment of a mint; and, that the Superintendent of finance be, and hereby is directed to prepare and report to Congress a plan for establishing and conducting the same.

The financier’s plan, developed with his assistant, Gouverneur Morris, was ambitious: he hoped to unite the fledgling Nation with a monetary unit that would allow for easy conversion from British, Spanish, Portuguese, or State currencies to U.S. funds. More importantly, Morris’s proposal would be the first system of coinage in Western Europe or the Americas to use decimal accounting – an innovation that has been adopted by every nation on earth in the last two centuries.

Due to the new government’s precarious financial situation, Congress did not put Morris’s plan into effect; however, Morris's decimal innovation was not lost on two of the Founding Fathers who examined Morris’s pattern coins: Alexander Hamilton and Thomas Jefferson, the primary architects of the U.S. Dollar. Both men became champions of the decimal concept after examining Morris’s coins.

While Thomas Jefferson was in possession of the Nova Constellatio coins, he wrote a report entitled “Notes on the Establishment of a Money Unit and of Coinage for the United States”; in it, Jefferson concluded:

The Financier, therefore, in his report, well proposes that our Coins should be in decimal proportions to one another. If we adopt the Dollar for our Unit, we should strike four coins, one of gold, two of silver, and one of copper, viz.:

1. A golden piece, equal in value to ten dollars:
2. The Unit or Dollar itself, of silver:
3. The tenth of a Dollar, of silver also:
4. The hundredth of a Dollar, of copper.

This is the first written description of the monetary system ultimately adopted by the United States, clearly illustrating the historical importance of Morris's patterns.

== Denominations ==
There are records of seven coins associated with Morris's plan:

1. A single silver coin of indeterminate denomination delivered to Morris on April 2nd, 1783. Upon its receipt, Morris recorded in his diary: I sent for Mr. Dudley who delivered me a Piece of Silver Coin being the first that has been struck as an American Coin. In 2017, David McCarthy uncovered that this piece was the plain obverse quint.

2. A set of silver coins comprising a 1,000-Unit piece, a 500-Unit piece, and three 100-Unit pieces. These coins were struck after Alexander Hamilton visited the Treasury, initiating correspondence “On the Subject of the Coin” between Morris and Hamilton, culminating in the decision to strike a set of coins “to lay before Congress”. These coins were later sent to Thomas Jefferson, who composed his “Notes on the Establishment of a Money Unit and of Coinage for the United States” while examining the set. Jefferson recorded the value of the set at $1.8, or 1,800-Units, indicating that its composition was one 1,000-Unit piece, one 500-Unit piece, and three 100-Unit pieces. This is the precise composition of the known silver examples bearing the legend "Nova Constellatio".

3. A 5-Unit copper piece bearing the legend "Nova Constellatio", which was sent to London prior to Jefferson’s receipt of the set.

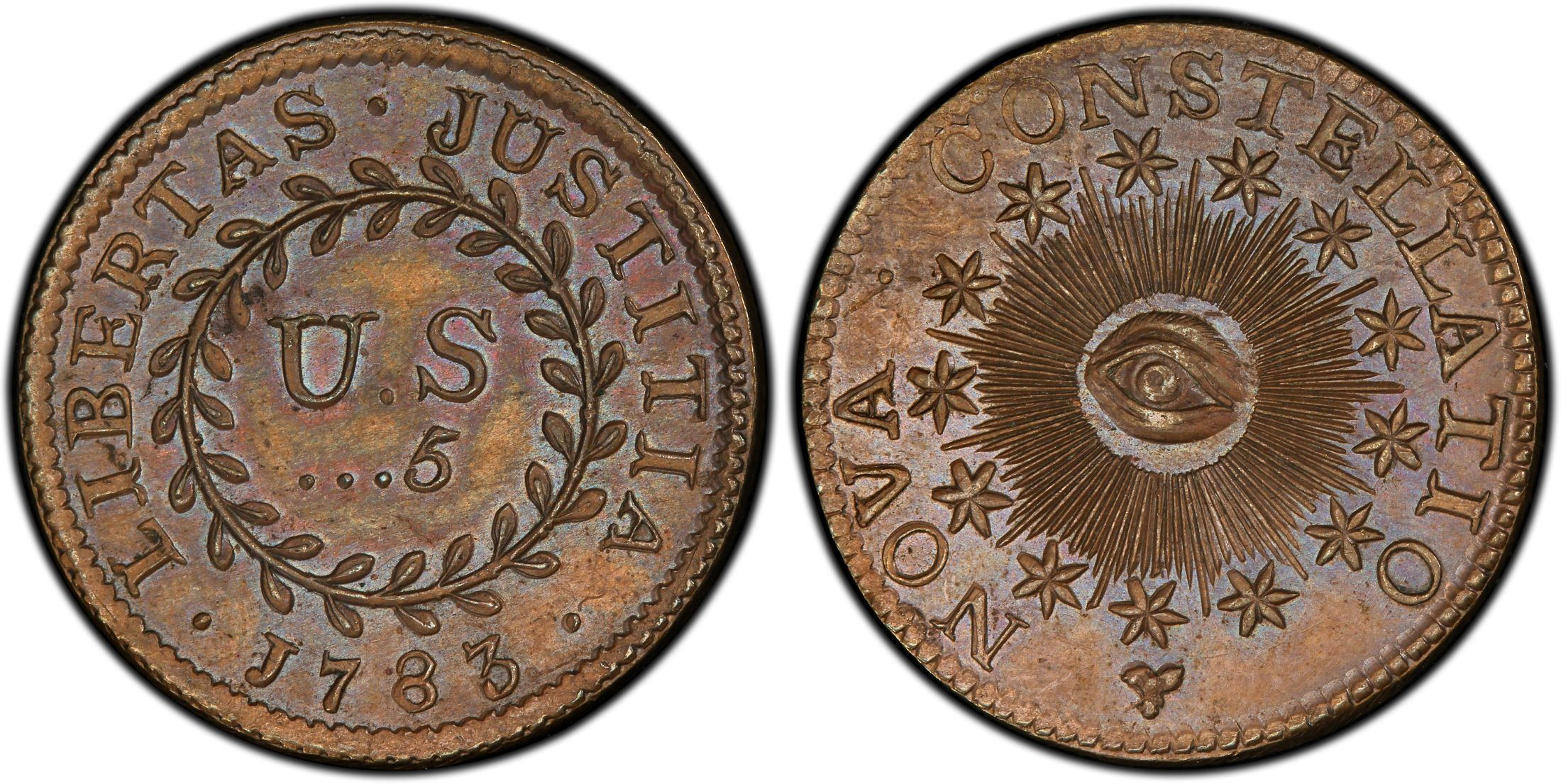
The 5 Unit coin

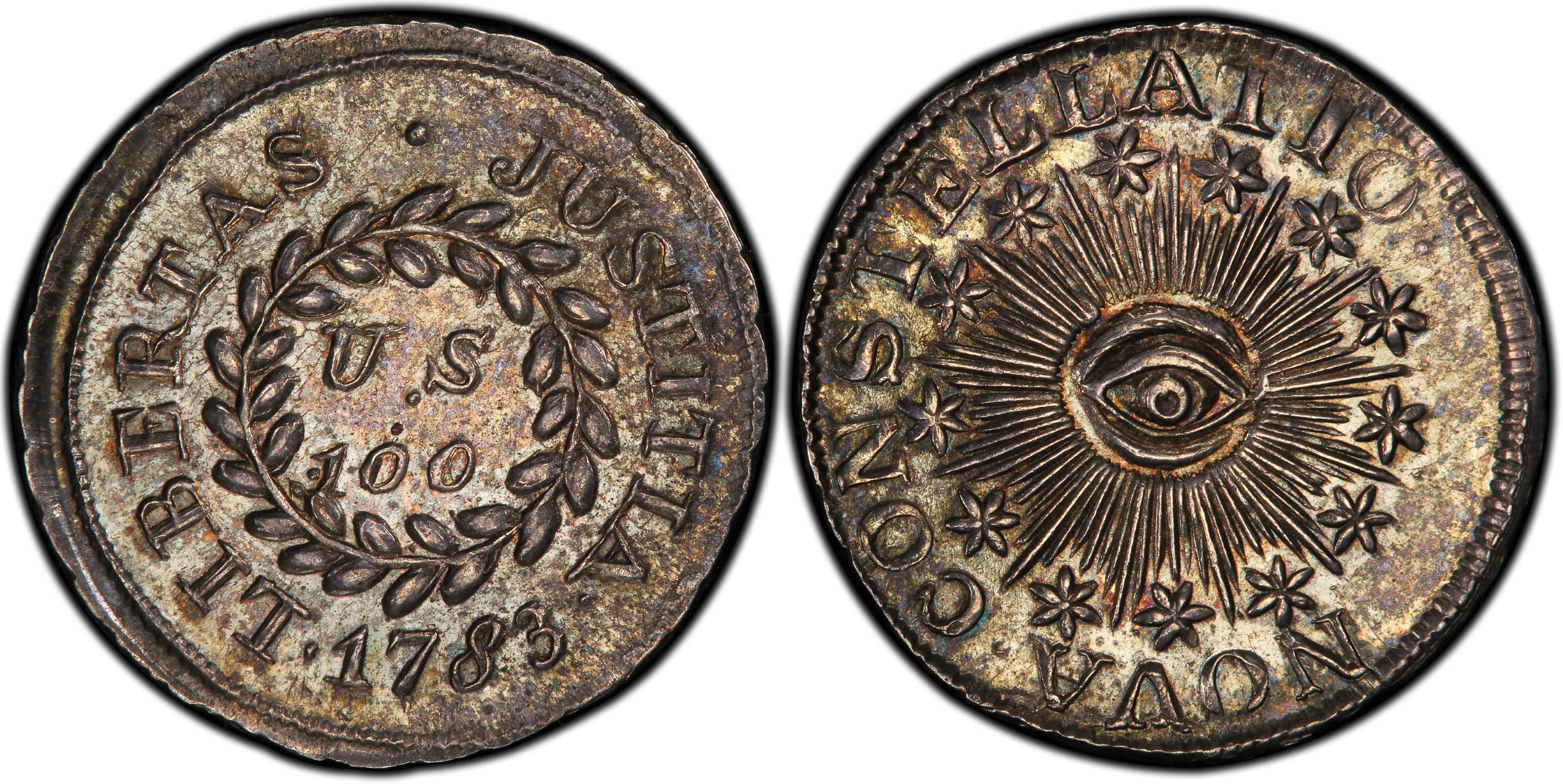
The 100 Unit coin

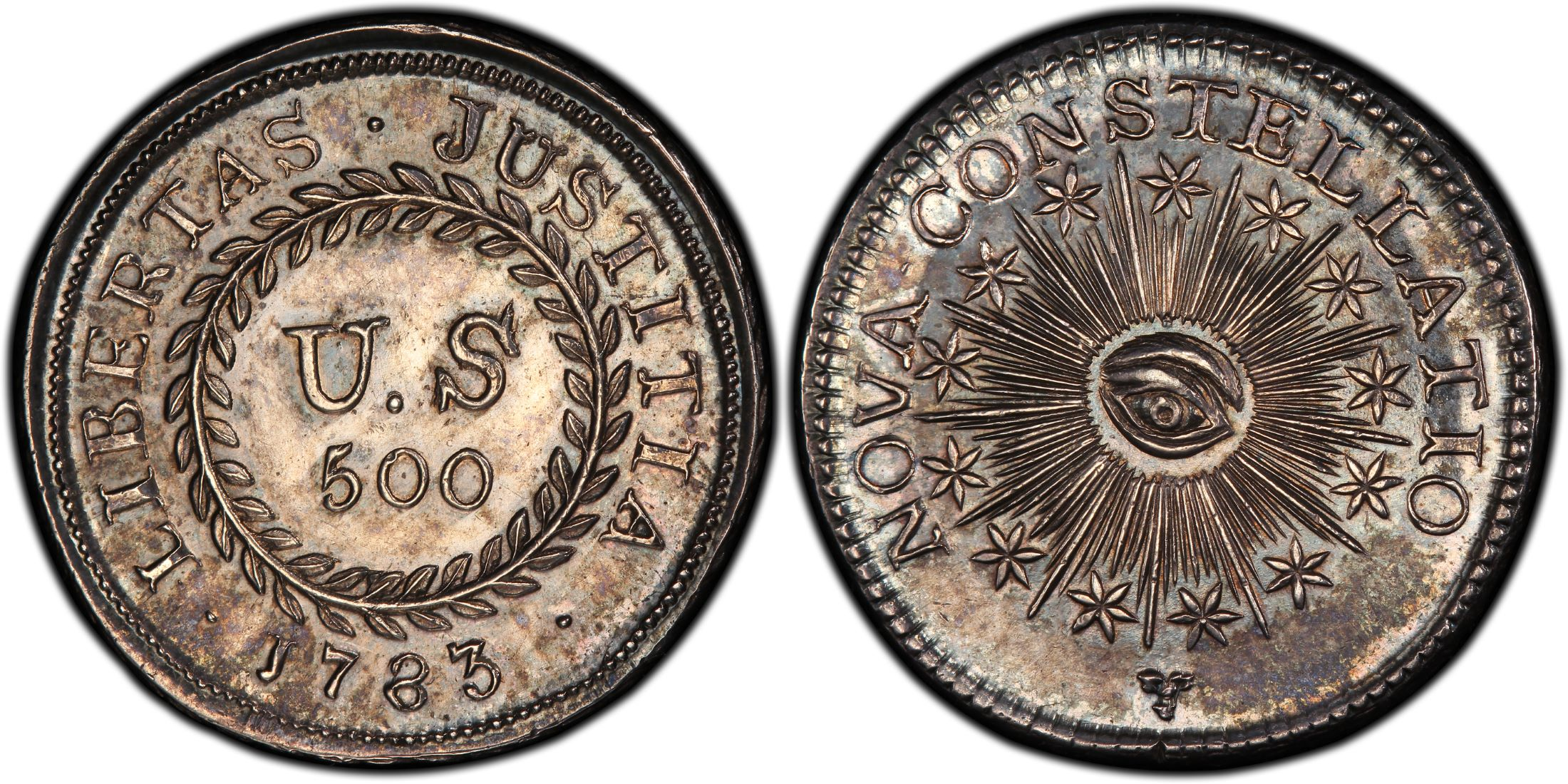
The 500 Unit coin

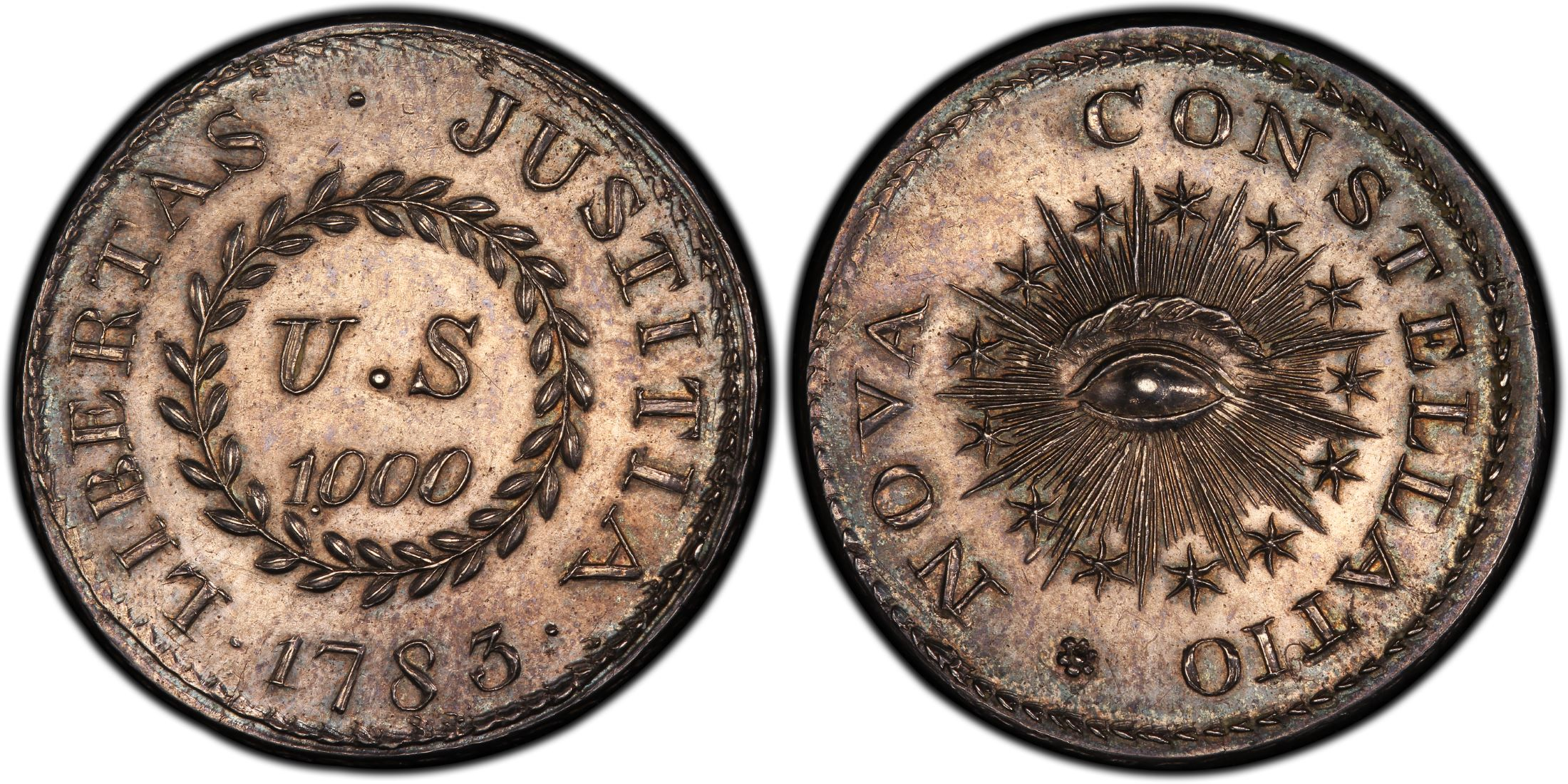
The 1,000 Unit coin

== Collecting ==
After being returned to Congress, the coins were dispersed. In the mid-1840s, the 1,000-unit and 500-Unit piece from the set bearing the Legend NOVA CONSTELLATIO (A NEW CONSTELLATION) were discovered by a descendant of longtime Secretary of Congress, Charles Thomson. From this point forward, Morris’s coins would be called the Nova Constellatios.

Twenty-five years would pass before another of Morris’s coins would be found. A second silver 500-Unit piece was uncovered in 1870; however, this specimen lacked the NOVA CONSTELLATIO legend. Collectors dubbed this coin the “Type-2”, because its design differed from the Congressional set’s 500-Unit piece. In 2017, the designation for this piece was officially changed to "Plain Obverse" in A Guide Book of United States Coins 2017: The Official Red Book, when forensic evidence demonstrated that it was struck prior to the example from the set that was sent to Congress.

By 1900, two types of 100-unit coins were found. Both bear the NOVA CONSTELLATIO inscription, but one has a plain edge and the other engraved. In 1979, the 5-Unit piece, also bearing the legend, was discovered in Europe. The final currently known piece, a third 100-Unit coin, first appeared in a 1991 auction from Stack's. Little is known about its provenance, and it is the only piece not currently certified by a third party grading service.
