= Robert Morris (Bartlett) =

Sculpture by Paul Wayland Bartlett

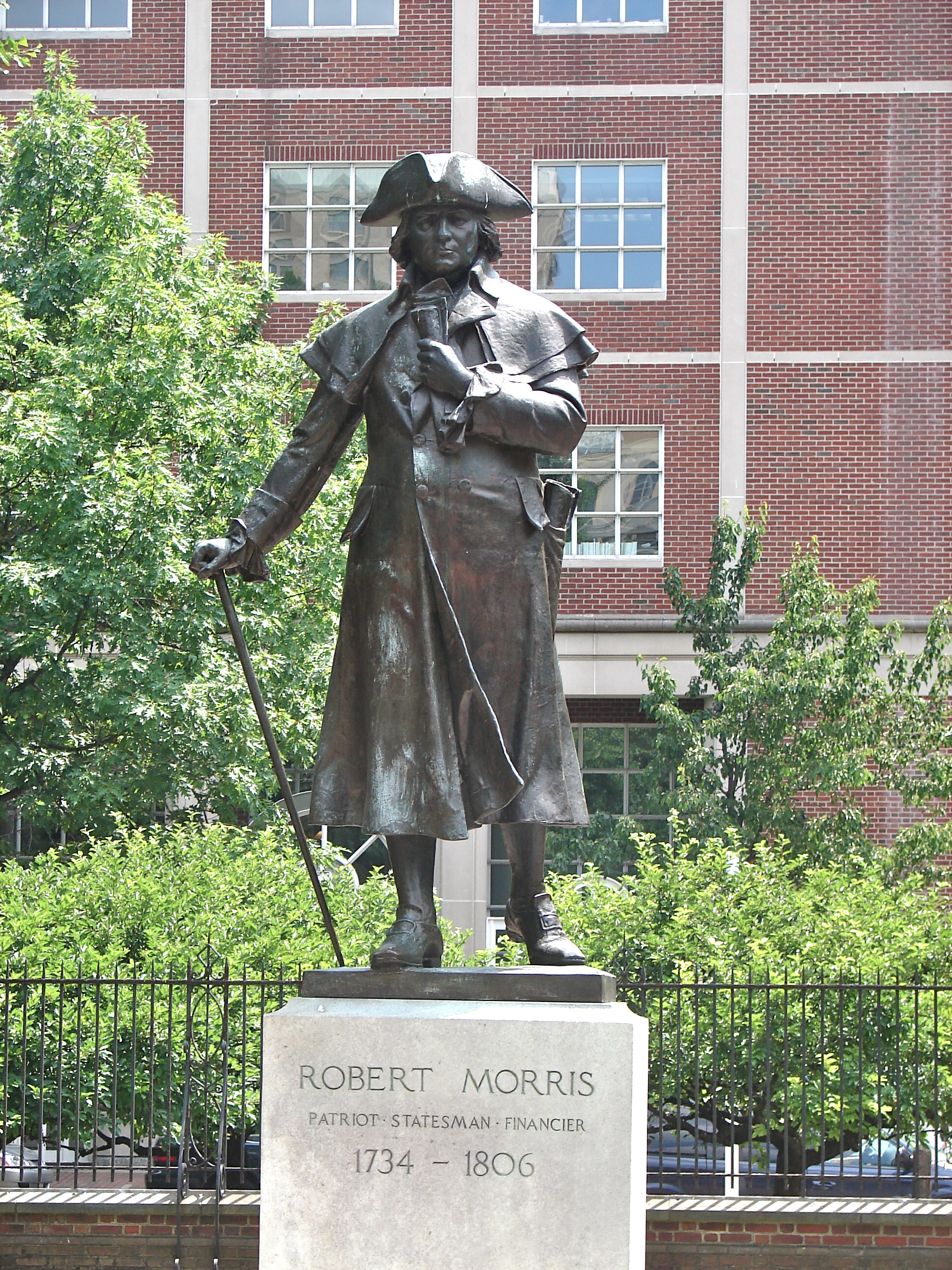
- Artist: Paul Wayland Bartlett
- Year: 1923
- Type: Bronze
- Dimensions: 300 cm × 120 cm × 120 cm (120 in × 48 in × 48 in)
- Location: Philadelphia; 39.9477°N 75.1486°W
- Owner: National Park Service

Robert Morris is a bronze statue by Paul Wayland Bartlett commemorating American Revolution financier and statesman Robert Morris. It is located at Independence Hall, on 4th Street and Walnut Street, Philadelphia.

It was dedicated on June 18, 1926, at the Second Bank of the United States on Chestnut Street, but was relocated in 1961.

The inscription reads:

(Sculpture, lower proper right edge:)
Paul W. Bartlett Sc.
(Sculpture, rear right side:)
J. Arthur Limerick Co.
Founders . Balto.
(Base, front:)

ROBERT MORRIS

PATRIOT.STATESMAN.FINANCIER

1734–1806

signed Founder's mark appears.

== See also ==
- List of public art in Philadelphia
