= Robert Morris (financier) =

American merchant, Founding Father, and politician (1734–1806)

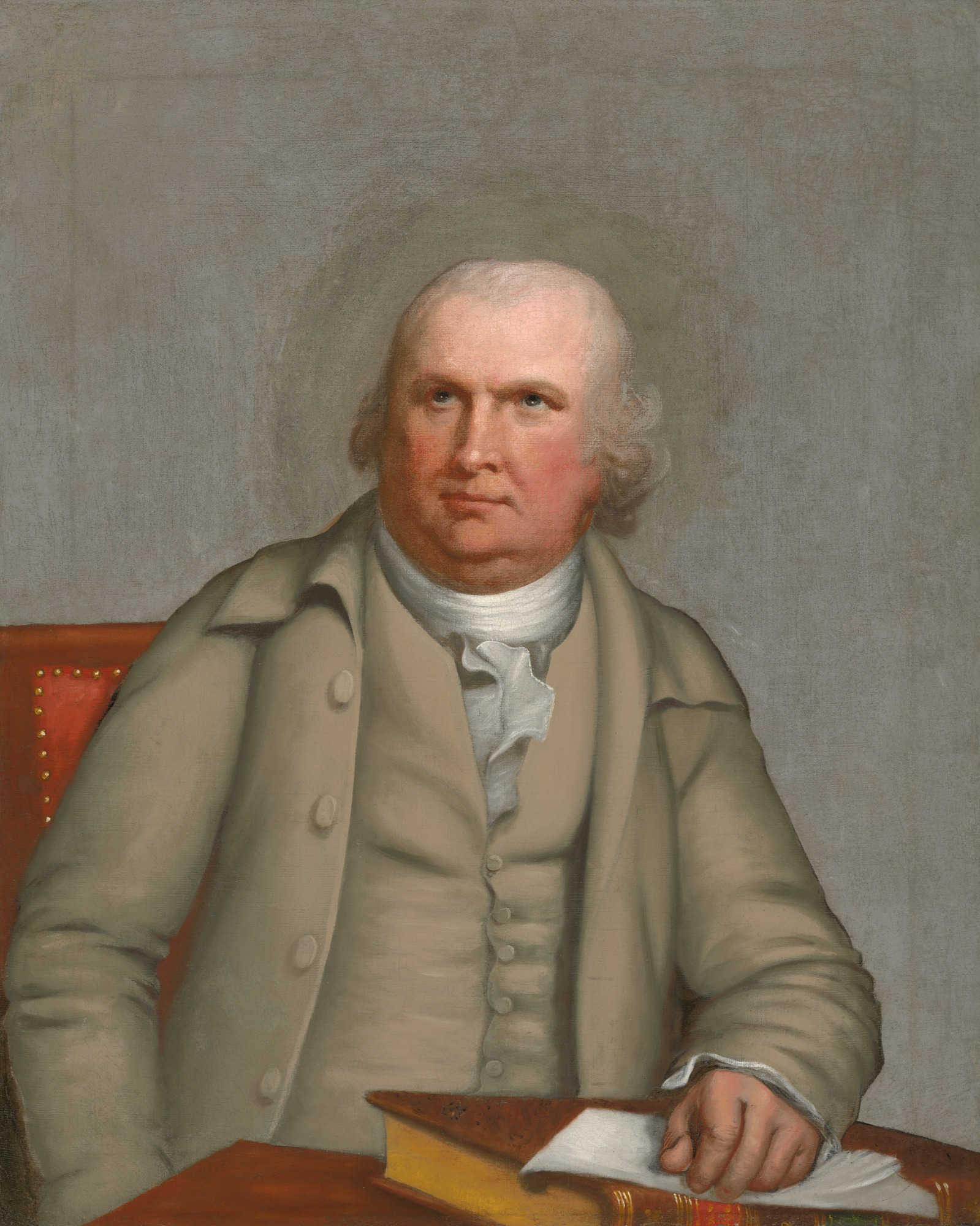
- Portrait by Robert Edge Pine, c. 1785

United States Senator from Pennsylvania
- In office March 4, 1789 – March 4, 1795
- Preceded by: Seat established
- Succeeded by: William Bingham

United States Agent of Marine
- In office August 12, 1781 – November 1, 1784
- Preceded by: Alexander McDougall (Secretary of Marine)
- Succeeded by: Benjamin Stoddert (Secretary of the Navy)

United States Superintendent of Finance
- In office June 27, 1781 – November 1, 1784
- Preceded by: Position established
- Succeeded by: Alexander Hamilton (Secretary of the Treasury)

Delegate to the; Second Continental Congress; from Pennsylvania
- In office 1775–1778

Personal details
- Born: January 20, 1734 Liverpool, Lancashire, England, Great Britain
- Died: May 8, 1806 (aged 72) Philadelphia, Pennsylvania, U.S.
- Resting place: Christ Church Burial Ground, Philadelphia, Pennsylvania, U.S.
- Party: Federalist
- Spouse: Mary White (1749–1827) (m. 1769)
- Children: 7, including Thomas

Robert Morris Jr. (January 20, 1734 – May 8, 1806) was a British-born American merchant, investor, and politician, and one of the Founding Fathers of the United States. Morris served in the Pennsylvania legislature, the Second Continental Congress, and the United States Senate. He was one of only two individuals (along with Roger Sherman) to sign the Declaration of Independence, the Articles of Confederation, and the U.S. Constitution. From 1781 to 1784, he held the post of Superintendent of Finance of the United States, a role that earned him the title "Financier of the Revolution". Alongside Alexander Hamilton and Albert Gallatin, Morris is often regarded as a founder of the financial system of the United States.

Born in Liverpool, Morris was brought to the Americas by his father when he was 13 years old, quickly becoming a partner in a successful shipping firm based in Philadelphia. In the aftermath of the French and Indian War, Morris joined with other merchants in opposing British tax policies such as the 1765 Stamp Act. By 1775, he was the richest man in America. After the outbreak of the American Revolutionary War, he helped procure arms and ammunition for the revolutionary cause, and in late 1775 he was chosen as a delegate to the Second Continental Congress. As a member of Congress, he served on the Secret Committee of Trade, which handled the procurement of supplies, the Committee of Correspondence, which handled foreign affairs, and the Marine Committee, which oversaw the Continental Navy. Morris was a leading member of Congress until he resigned in 1778. Out of office, Morris refocused on his merchant career and won election to the Pennsylvania Assembly, where he became a leader of the "Republican" faction that sought alterations to the Pennsylvania Constitution.

Facing a difficult financial situation in the ongoing Revolutionary War, in 1781 Congress established the position of Superintendent of Finance to oversee financial matters. Morris accepted appointment as Superintendent of Finance and also served as Agent of Marine, from which he controlled the Continental Navy. He helped provide supplies to the Continental Army under General George Washington, enabling, with the help of frequent collaborator Haym Salomon, the decisive victory in the Battle of Yorktown. Morris also reformed government contracting and established the Bank of North America, the first congressionally chartered national bank to operate in the United States. Morris believed that the national government would be unable to achieve financial stability without the power to levy taxes and tariffs, but he was unable to convince all thirteen states to agree to an amendment to the Articles of Confederation. Frustrated by the weakness of the national government, Morris resigned as Superintendent of Finance in 1784. Morris was elected to the American Philosophical Society in 1786.

In 1787, Morris was selected as a delegate to the Philadelphia Convention, which wrote and proposed a new constitution for the United States. Morris rarely spoke during the convention, but the constitution produced by the convention reflected many of his ideas. Morris and his allies helped ensure that Pennsylvania ratified the new constitution, and the document was ratified by the requisite number of states by the end of 1788. The Pennsylvania legislature subsequently elected Morris as one of its two inaugural representatives in the United States Senate. Morris declined Washington's offer to serve as the nation's first Treasury Secretary, instead suggesting Alexander Hamilton for the position. In the Senate, Morris supported Hamilton's economic program and aligned with the Federalist Party. During and after his service in the Senate, Morris went deeply into debt through speculating on land, leading into the Panic of 1796–1797. Unable to pay his creditors, he was confined in the Prune Street debtors' apartment adjacent to Walnut Street Prison from 1798 to 1801. After being released from prison, he lived a quiet, private life in a modest home in Philadelphia until his death in 1806.

== Early life ==
=== Youth ===
Morris was born in Liverpool, England, on January 20, 1734. His parents were Robert Morris Sr., an agent for a shipping firm, and Elizabeth Murphet; biographer Charles Rappleye concludes that Morris was probably born out of wedlock. Until he reached the age of thirteen, Morris was raised by his maternal grandmother in England. In 1747, Morris immigrated to Oxford, Maryland, where his father had prospered in the tobacco trade. Two years later, Morris's father sent him to Philadelphia, then the most populous city in British North America, where Morris lived under the care of his father's friend, Charles Greenway.

=== Merchant career ===
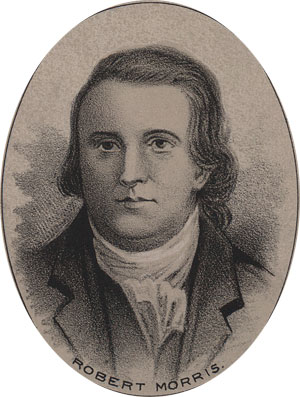
An engraving by Ole Erekson, c. 1876, of Robert Morris

Greenway arranged for Morris to become an apprentice at the shipping and banking firm of Philadelphia merchant Charles Willing. In 1750, Robert Morris Sr. died from an infected wound, (Note: The wound was sustained when he was hit by a bottle that was christening a new ship and it didn't break and came back, hitting him in the head.) leaving much of his substantial estate to his son. Morris impressed Willing and rose from a teenage trainee to become a key agent in Willing's firm. Morris traveled to Caribbean ports to expand the firm's business, and he gained a knowledge of trading and the various currencies used to exchange goods. He also befriended Thomas Willing, the oldest son of Charles Willing who was two years older than Morris and who, like Morris, had split his life between England and British North America. Charles Willing died in 1754, and in 1757 Thomas made Morris a full partner in the newly renamed firm of Willing Morris & Company.

Morris's shipping firm was just one of many such firms operating in Philadelphia, but Willing, Morris & Co. pursued several innovative strategies. The firm pooled with other shipping firms to insure vessels, aggressively expanded trade with India, and underwrote government projects through bonds and promissory notes. Ships of the firm traded with India, the Levant, the West Indies, Spanish Cuba, Spain, and Italy. The firm's business of import, export, and general agency made it one of the most prosperous in Pennsylvania. In 1784, Morris, with other investors, underwrote the voyage of the ship Empress of China, the first American vessel to visit China.

==== Slavery ====
Morris's partnership with Willing was established just after the outbreak of the French and Indian War, which hindered the usual supply of indentured servants from the British Isles to Pennsylvania. The most direct effect on the supply was action by Parliament to forbid immigration to the Americas, and simultaneously promote the slave trade. Many potential servants had been conscripted by the British Army to fight in Continental Europe, and a significant portion of the servants already in Pennsylvania were nearing the ends of their contracts. As such, there was a rapidly increasing demand in Pennsylvania for a supply of new slaves to compensate for the ongoing labor shortage. While Morris was a junior partner in the firm and Willing was pursuing a political career, Willing, Morris & Co. co-signed a petition calling for the repeal of Pennsylvania's tariff on imported slaves. In 1762, approximately 200 slaves were imported into Philadelphia, at the height of Pennsylvania's involvement in the Atlantic slave trade; most were brought in by Rhode Island merchants Mark Anthony DeWolf, Aaron Lopez, and Jacob Rivera.

As part of their commercial operations, Willing, Morris & Co. engaged in the slave trade. The firm advertised slave sales and directed company ships to purchase slaves from Africa to sell in British North America. One of the first ships the firm purchased, Nancy, was used to make two voyages to Africa to purchase slaves; the first voyage occurred in 1762, and resulted in the sale of approximately 170 slaves purchased from the Gold Coast in Wilmington, Delaware. Though it was profitable, this voyage did not make a large profit, and a second slave-trading voyage by Nancy resulted in her capture by French privateers. Willing, Morris & Co. also handled two slave auctions for other importers of slaves, offering 23 slaves for sale. Three years later, the firm advertised 17 slaves for sale who were brought from Africa on board the slave ship Marquis de Granby. The slaves were not sold in Philadelphia, as the owner took the ship and all the slaves to Jamaica. This was the last time Willing, Morris & Co. was involved in slave trade. During the Revolution Morris employed a French chief, and afterwards engaged a former slave under terms of indenture.

== Personal and family life ==
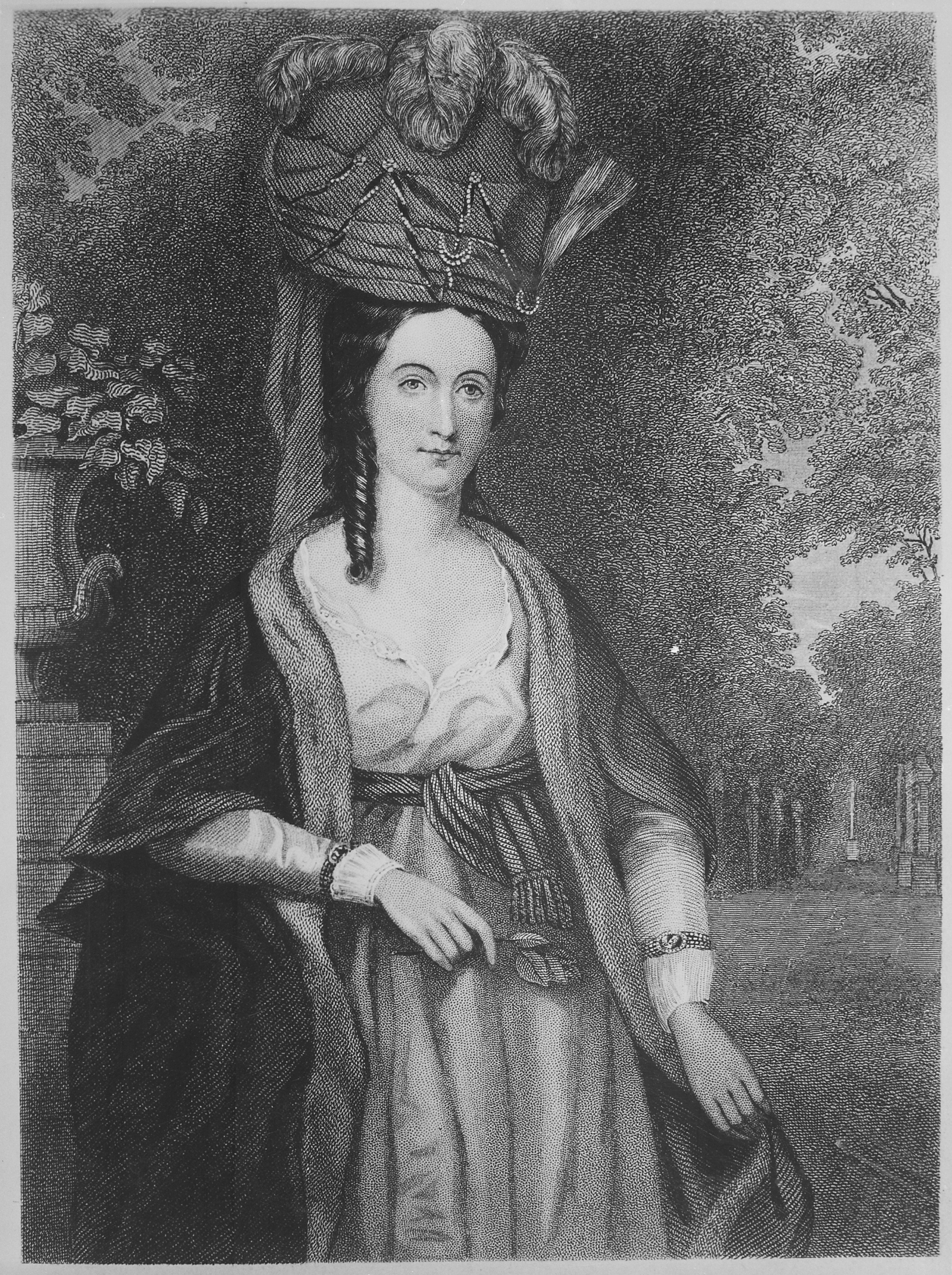
Mary Morris, Robert Morris's wife portrait by Charles Willson Peale

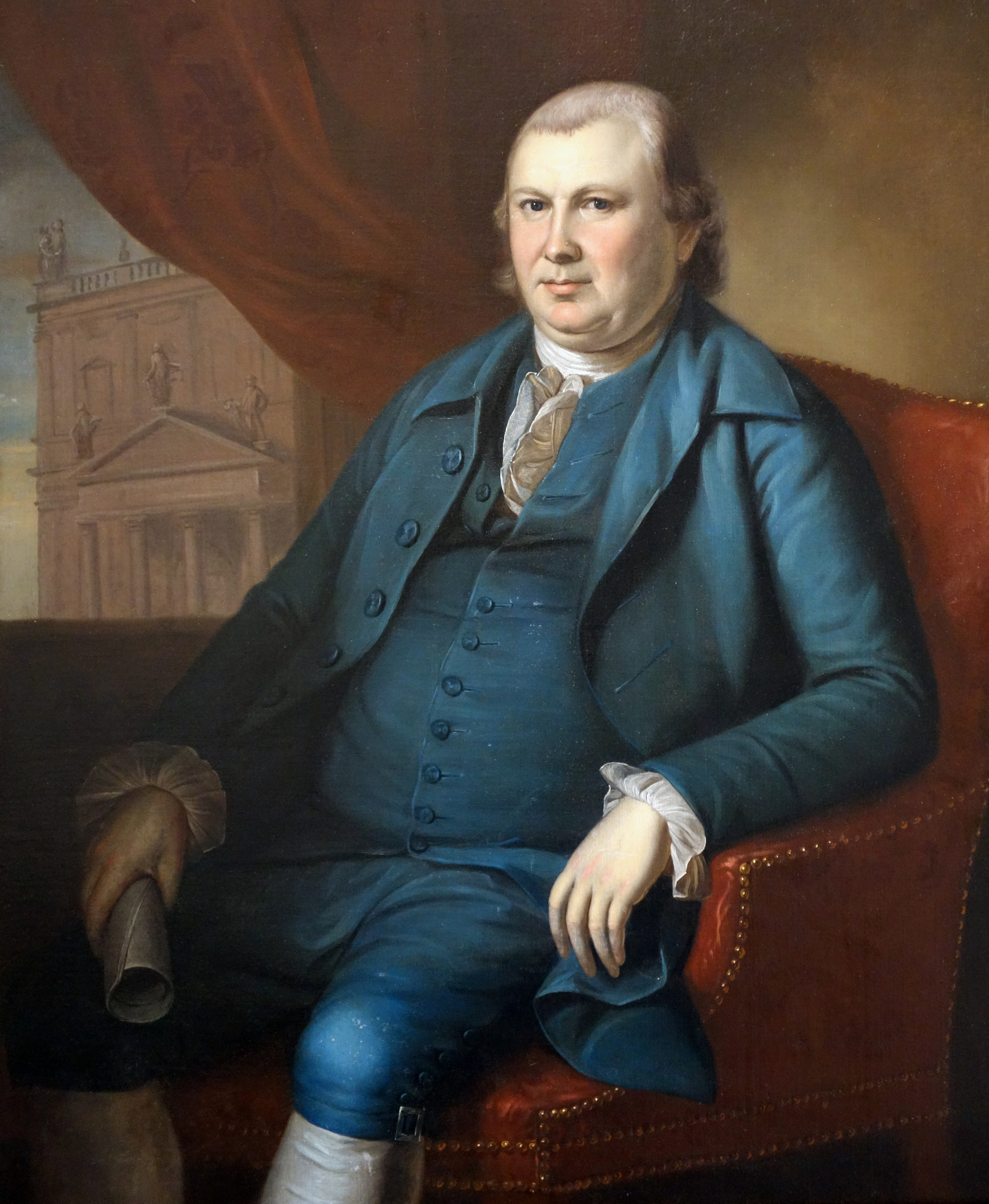
Portrait of Robert Morris, c. 1782, by Charles Willson Peale

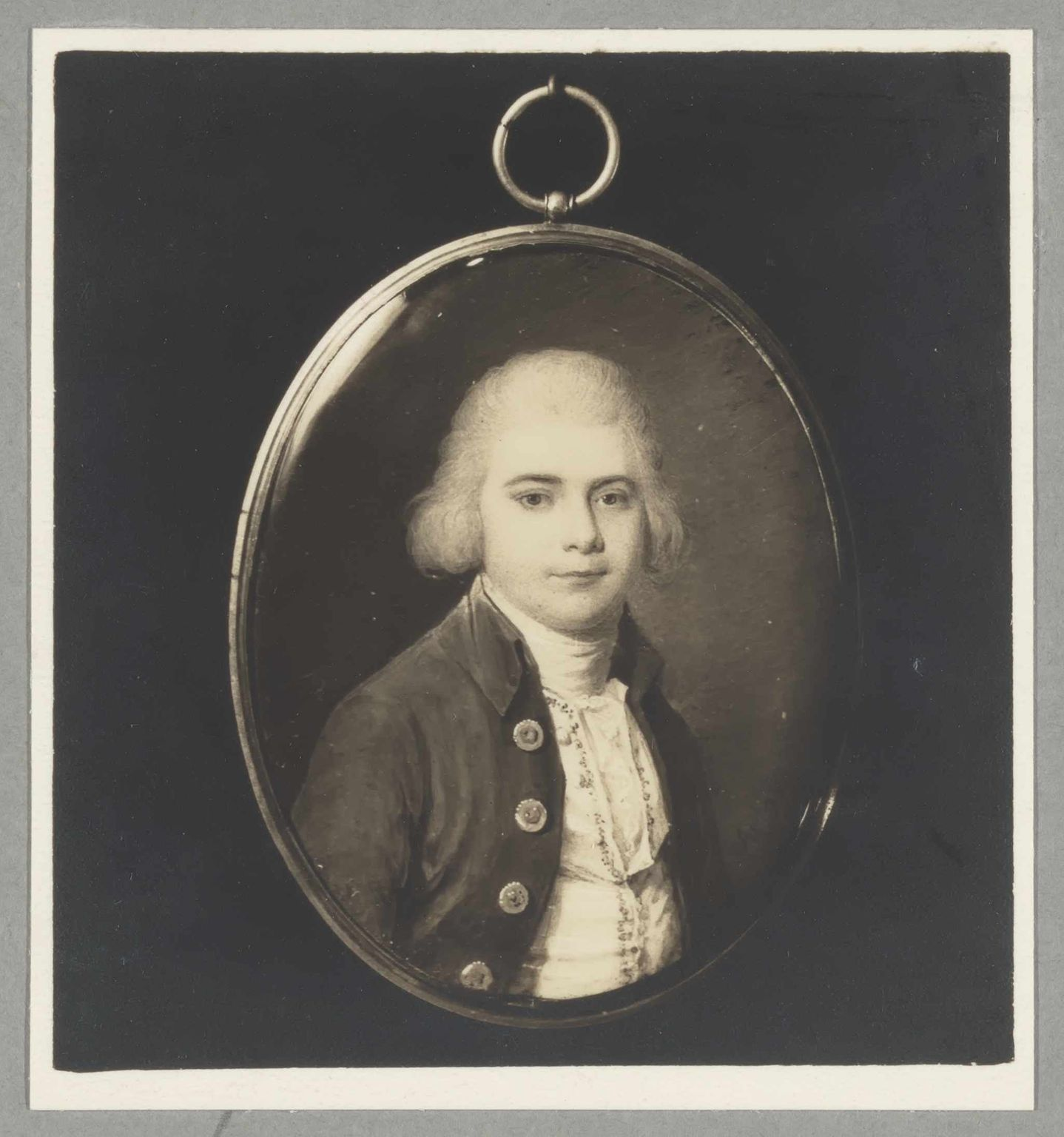
Robert Morris Jr. 1769–1815

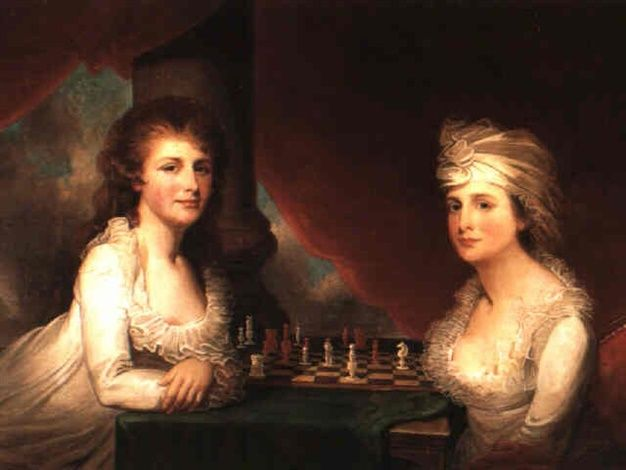
Hester Morris (Mrs James Markham Marshall), and her sister Maria Morris (Mrs. Henry Nixon) portrait by Gilbert Stuart

In early 1769, at age 35, Morris married 20-year-old Mary White, the daughter of a wealthy and prestigious lawyer and landholder. Mary gave birth to the couple's first of seven children in December 1769. (One son was Congressman Thomas Morris, whose wife was related to the Livingston and Van Rensselaer New York political families). Morris and his family lived on Front Street in Philadelphia and maintained a second home, known as "The Hills," on the Schuylkill River to the northwest of the city. He later purchased another rural manor, which he named Morrisville, that was located across the Delaware River from Trenton, New Jersey. The Morrises worshiped at the Anglican Christ Church, which was also attended by Benjamin Franklin, Thomas Willing, and other leading citizens of Philadelphia. The Morris household employed several domestic workers and retained several slaves.

In addition to the children he had with Mary White, Morris fathered a daughter, Polly, out of wedlock around 1763. Morris supported Polly financially and remained in contact with her throughout her adult life. Morris also supported a younger half-brother, Thomas, whom Morris's father had sired out of wedlock shortly before his own death. Thomas eventually became a partner in Morris's shipping firm.

Mary's brother, William White, was ordained as an Episcopal priest and served as the Senate chaplain.

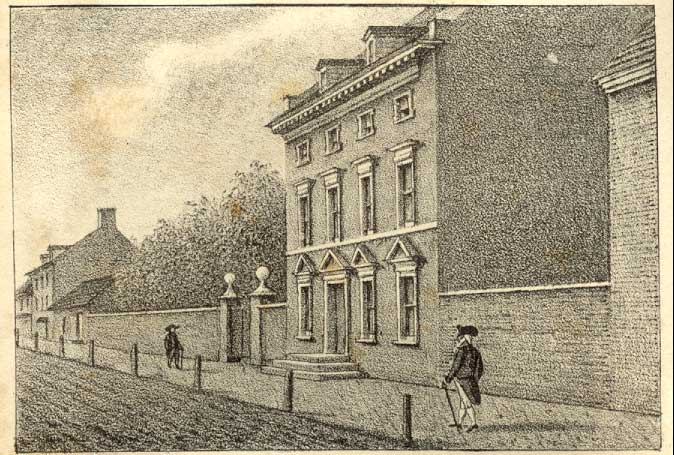
Morris owned what became known as the President's House in Philadelphia

In 1781, Morris purchased a home on Market Street that was two blocks north of Independence Hall, the seat of the Second Continental Congress. He gained clear title to the estate in 1785 and made it his primary residence. In 1790, President George Washington accepted Morris's offer to make the house his primary residence; Morris and his family subsequently moved to a smaller, neighboring property. By the 1790s, Morris had become close friends with Washington, and he and his wife were regular fixtures at state events thrown by the president. The President's House, as it became known, served as the residence of the president until 1800, when President John Adams moved to the White House in Washington, D.C.

== American Revolution ==
=== Rising tensions with Britain ===
In 1765, the Parliament of Great Britain imposed the Stamp Act, a tax on transactions involving paper that proved widely unpopular in British North America. In one of his first major political acts, Morris joined with several other merchants in pressuring British agent John Hughes to refrain from collecting the new tax. Facing colonial resistance, Parliament repealed the tax, but it later implemented other policies designed to generate tax revenue from the colonies. During the decade after the imposition of the Stamp Act, Morris would frequently join with other merchants in protesting many of Parliament's taxation policies. Writing to a friend about his objections to British tax policies, Morris stated that "I am a native of England but from principle am American in this dispute." While his partner, Thomas Willing, served in various governmental positions, Morris declined to serve in any public office other than that of port warden (a position he shared with six other individuals), and he generally let Willing act as the public face of the firm. In early 1774, in response to the Intolerable Acts, many colonists in British North America began calling for a boycott of British goods. In Philadelphia, Willing, Charles Thomson, and John Dickinson took the lead in calling for a congress of all the colonies to coordinate a response to British tax policies. Morris was not elected to the First Continental Congress, which convened in Philadelphia in August 1774, but he frequently met with the congressional delegates and befriended colonial leaders such as George Washington and John Jay. Morris generally sympathized with the position of the delegates who favored the reform of British policies but were unwilling to fully break with Britain. In September 1774, the First Continental Congress voted to create the Continental Association, an agreement to enforce a boycott against British goods beginning in December; it also advised each colony to establish committees to enforce the boycott. Morris was elected to the Philadelphia committee charged with enforcing the boycott.

=== Continental Congress ===
==== Early war, 1775–August 1776 ====
In April 1775, the American Revolutionary War broke out following the Battles of Lexington and Concord. Shortly thereafter, the Second Continental Congress began meeting in Philadelphia, and Congress appointed George Washington to command the Continental Army. The Pennsylvania Provincial Assembly established the twenty-five member Committee of Safety to supervise defenses, and Morris was appointed to the committee. Morris became part of the core group of members that directed the committee and served as the committee's chairman when Benjamin Franklin was absent. Charged with obtaining gunpowder, Morris arranged a large-scale smuggling operation to avoid British laws designed to prevent arms and ammunition from being imported into the colonies. Due to his success at smuggling gunpowder for Pennsylvania, Morris also became the chief supplier of gunpowder to the Continental Army. Morris became increasingly focused on political affairs rather than business, and in October 1775 he won election to the Pennsylvania Provincial Assembly. Later in the year, the Provincial Assembly elected Morris as a delegate to Congress.

In Congress, Morris aligned with the less radical faction of delegates that protested British policies but continued to favor reconciliation with Britain. He was appointed to the Secret Committee of Trade, which supervised the procurement of arms and ammunition. As the revolutionary government lacked an executive branch or a civil service, the committees of Congress handled all government business. Biographer Charles Rappleye writes that the committee "handled its contracts in a clubby, often incestuous manner" that may have unfairly benefited politically connected merchants, including Morris. However, Rappleye also notes that the dangerous and secretive nature of a committee charged with obtaining contraband goods made it difficult for the committee to establish competitive bidding procedures for procurement contracts. In addition to his service on the Secret Committee of Trade, Morris was also appointed to the Marine Committee, which oversaw the Continental Navy, (Note: Morris had earlier contributed to the navy by selling his firm's ship, The Black Prince, which became the USS Alfred.) and the Committee of Secret Correspondence, which oversaw efforts to establish relations with foreign powers. From his position on the latter committee, Morris helped arrange for the appointment of Silas Deane as Congress's representative to France; Deane was charged with procuring supplies and securing a formal alliance with France.

Throughout 1776, Morris would emerge as a key figure on the Marine Committee; Rappleye describes him as the "de facto commander" of the Continental Navy. Morris favored a naval strategy of attacking Britain's "defenseless places" in an effort to divide Britain's numerically superior fleet. Along with Franklin, Dickinson, and John Adams, Morris helped draft the Model Treaty, which was designed to serve as a template for relations with foreign countries. Unlike Britain's mercantile trade policies, the Model Treaty emphasized the importance of free trade. In March 1776, after the death of Samuel Ward, Morris was named as the chairman of the Secret Committee of Trade. He established a network of agents, based in both the colonies and various foreign ports, charged with procuring supplies for the Continental war effort.

In late February 1776, Americans learned that the British Parliament had passed the Prohibitory Act, which declared that all American shipping was subject to seizure by British ships. Unlike many other congressional leaders, Morris continued to hope for reconciliation with Britain, since he believed that all-out war still lacked the strong support of a majority of Americans and would prove financially ruinous. In June 1776, due largely to frustration with the moderate faction of Pennsylvania leaders that included Morris, a convention of delegates from across Pennsylvania began meeting to draft a new constitution and establish a new state government. At the same time, Congress was debating whether to formally declare independence from Britain.

When Congress voted in committee on July 1, nine colonies voted to declare independence, South Carolina and Pennsylvania voted against it, and Delaware and New York abstained. It was clear that when the formal vote was taken the next day, South Carolina and Delaware would both vote in favor of independence, leaving Pennsylvania the only colony voting against it (with New York continuing to abstain). In order to preserve Continental unity—which every delegate, regardless of how they felt about independence, knew to be of critical importance—Morris and John Dickinson therefore failed to attend the vote on independence, thereby giving the pro-independence movement a majority in the Pennsylvania delegation. With Morris absent, the twelve participating delegations voted to pass a resolution declaring independence on July 2, and the United States formally declared independence on July 4, 1776.

Despite his opposition to independence, and much to Morris's surprise, the Pennsylvania constitutional convention voted to keep Morris in Congress; he was the lone anti-independence delegate from Pennsylvania to retain his position. In August, Morris signed the Declaration of Independence despite having abstained. In explaining his decision, he stated, "I am not one of those politicians that run testy when my own plans are not adopted. I think it is the duty of a good citizen to follow when he cannot lead." He also stated, "while I do not wish to see my countrymen die on the field of battle nor do I wish to see them live in tyranny".

==== Continued war, August 1776–1778 ====
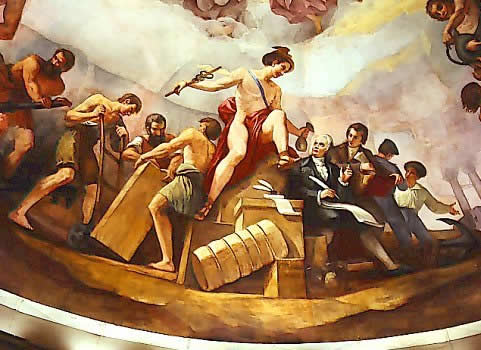
A scene from The Apotheosis of Washington shows Morris receiving a bag of gold from Mercury, commemorating his financial services during the Revolutionary War

After the Declaration of Independence was issued, Morris continued to supervise and coordinate efforts to secure arms and ammunition and export American goods. His strategy focused on using ships from New England to export tobacco and other goods from the Southern states to Europe and the islands of the Caribbean, then using the capital obtained from those exports to purchase military supplies from Europe. British spies and warships often frustrated his plans, and many American ships were captured in the midst of trading operations. In response, Morris authorized American envoys in Europe to commission privateers to attack British shipping, and he arranged for an agent, William Bingham, to pay for repairs to American privateers on the French island of Martinique. Due to the lucrative nature of privateering, Morris also started outfitting his own privateers. Another agent of Morris's, his half-brother Thomas Morris, proved a disastrous choice for managing American privateers in Europe, as Thomas engaged in binge drinking and mismanaged funds. In October 1776, at the urging of Morris and Benjamin Franklin, Congress authorized the appointment of two envoys charged with seeking a formal treaty of alliance with France; ultimately, Benjamin Franklin and Arthur Lee were appointed as those envoys. Along with Silas Deane, Franklin would help to greatly expand arms shipments from France and Spain, but Lee proved to be completely incompetent in his efforts to gain support from Prussia and the Habsburg monarchy.

In early December 1776, Washington's army was forced to retreat across the Delaware River and into Pennsylvania, and most members of Congress temporarily left Philadelphia. Morris was one of few delegates to remain in the city, and Congress appointed Morris and two other delegates to "execute Continental business" in its absence. Morris frequently corresponded with Washington, and he provided supplies that helped enable the Continental victory at the Battle of Trenton. After the Continental Army was defeated in the September 1777 Battle of Brandywine, Congress fled west from Philadelphia; Morris and his family went to live at the estate they had recently purchased in Manheim, Pennsylvania. Morris obtained a leave of absence in late 1777, but he spent much of his time defending himself against attacks regarding alleged mismanagement and financial improprieties levied by the pro-slavery allies of Henry Laurens, the president of the Continental Congress. Due to his leave of absence, Morris did not play a large role in drafting the Articles of Confederation, which would be the first constitution of the United States, but he signed the document in March 1778. As some states objected to the Articles, it would not enter into force until 1781.

Morris returned to Congress in May 1778 to vote for a measure to provide pensions to Continental Army officers. He formed a close working relationship with Gouverneur Morris (no relation), a young New York congressman who shared many of Robert Morris's views. The following month, Morris returned with Congress to Philadelphia, which had been evacuated by the British. Morris did not resume his wide array of duties in Congress, seeking instead to wind down his projects so that he could focus on business. In late 1778, Morris won election to the state assembly as part of a slate of candidates that favored reforming the Pennsylvania constitution; he resigned from Congress to take up his seat. After Morris left Congress, Henry Laurens, Thomas Paine, and some other members of Congress continued their false attacks on him for allegedly using his position in Congress for his own financial benefit, but in early 1779 a congressional committee cleared Morris of all charges.

=== Out of Congress, 1779–1781 ===
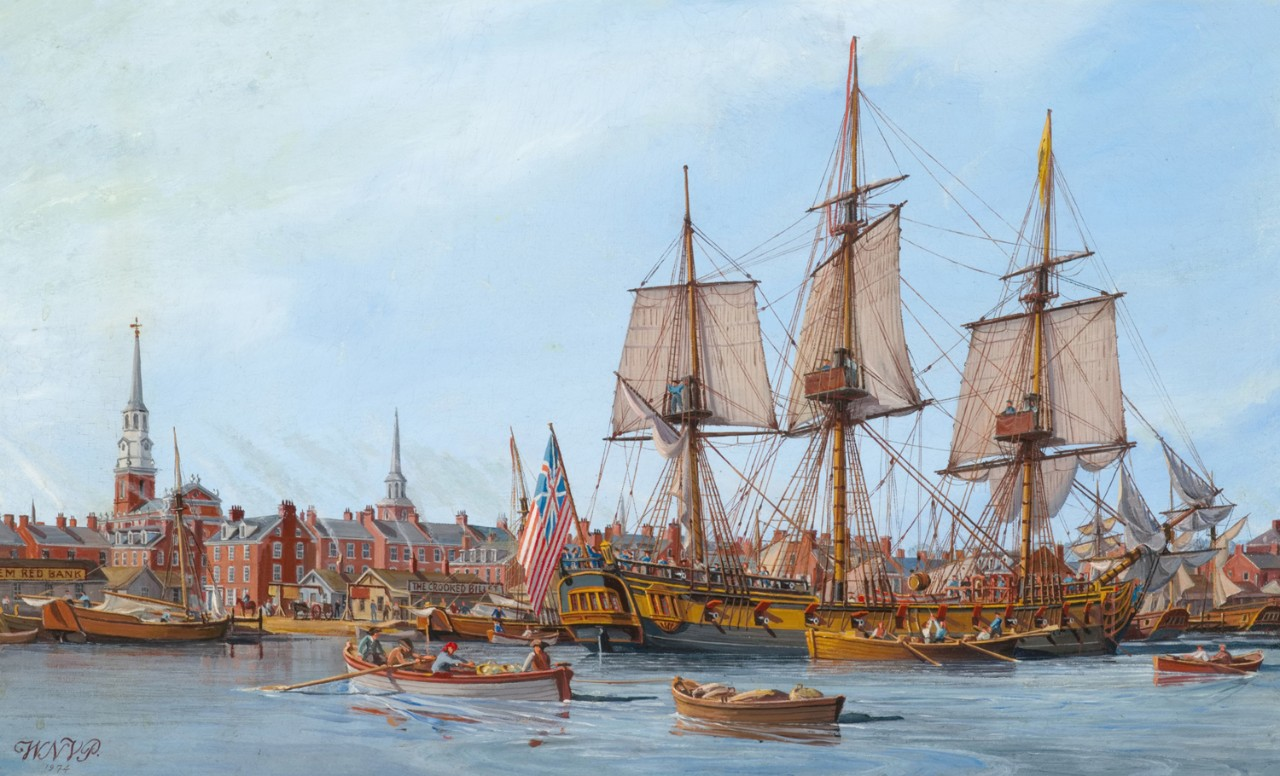
USS Alfred, a Continental Navy frigate previously owned by Morris

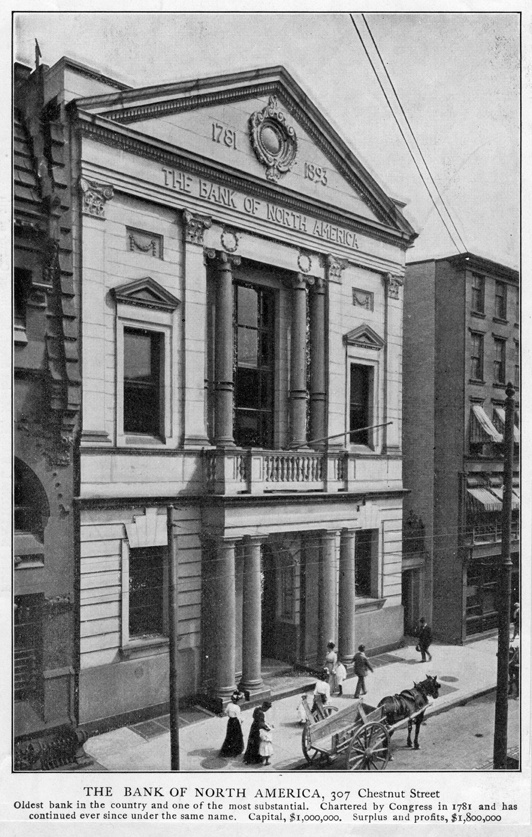
Bank of North America's original location at 307 Chestnut Street in Philadelphia

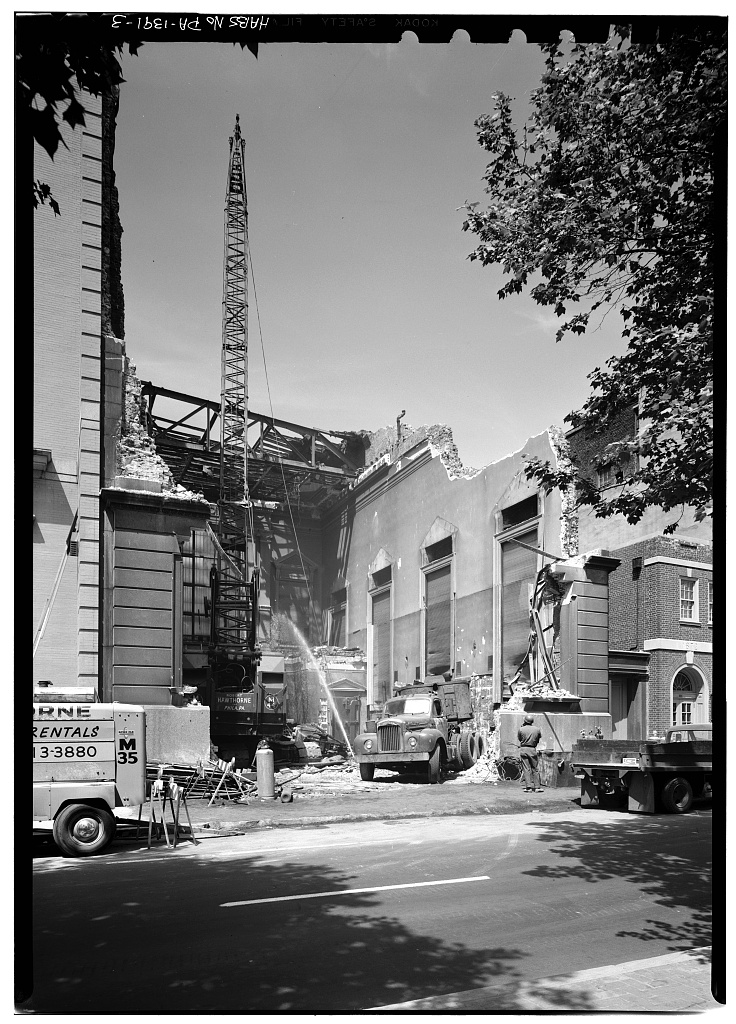
Demolishing the Bank of North America's building at 305–307 Chestnut Street in Philadelphia, c. 1959

With their plans to call a new state constitutional convention frustrated by Joseph Reed and others, Morris and James Wilson founded the Republican Society, a political club devoted to implementing a new state constitution. The Republican Society favored a bicameral legislature, a state executive with veto power, an independent judiciary, and an end to loyalty oaths to the state government. These semi-religious oaths were designed to disenfranchise Quakers, Anabaptists, Jews, and other religious minorities. Other prominent Pennsylvanians, including Wilson, Benjamin Rush, Thomas Mifflin, and Charles Thomson, supported the Republican Society's goals, but Morris became the de facto leader of the faction that became known as the Republicans. Meanwhile, those who favored maintaining the state constitution became known as the Constitutionalists.

Due to rising inflation, in mid-1779 the Constitutionalists established a committee to implement price controls; numerous Philadelphia merchants were arrested for allegedly violating the committee's orders, but Morris avoided imprisonment and emerged as a leading opponent of the committee. The price control committee proved ineffective and disbanded in September, but the following month a mob rioted and seized several Republican leaders. Morris and other Republicans sheltered at James Wilson's house, where they were rescued by Reed and a detachment of the Continental Army. Wilson fled the city after the riot, and popular anger at merchants resulted in Morris's defeat in his campaign for re-election to the state legislature.

Out of public office for the first time since the start of the American Revolution, Morris focused on expanding his shipping business. He partnered with several out-of-state businessmen, including Jonathan Hudson of Maryland and Carter Braxton and Benjamin Harrison of Virginia, to form what biographer Charles Rappleye calls "the first national conglomerate." In these trading ventures, Morris often provided financing and oversight but left the details to his partners. With national finances in tatters, Morris led a group of merchants in creating the Bank of Pennsylvania, which provided funding for the purchase of supplies by the Continental Army. The bank did not engage in the full range of modern banking activities, but it did accept deposits and provide a potential model for monetary reforms at the national level. The success of the bank provided a boost to Morris's popularity, and in October 1780, he won election to the state legislature.William Bingham, rumored to be the richest man in America after the Revolutionary War, purchased 9.5% of the available shares of the Bank of North America. The greatest share, however, 63.3%, was purchased on behalf of the United States government by Robert Morris, using a gift in the form of a loan from France and a loan from Netherlands. This had the effect of capitalizing the bank with large deposits of gold and silver coin and bills of exchange. He then issued new paper currency backed by this supply.

=== Superintendent of Finance ===
==== First months ====
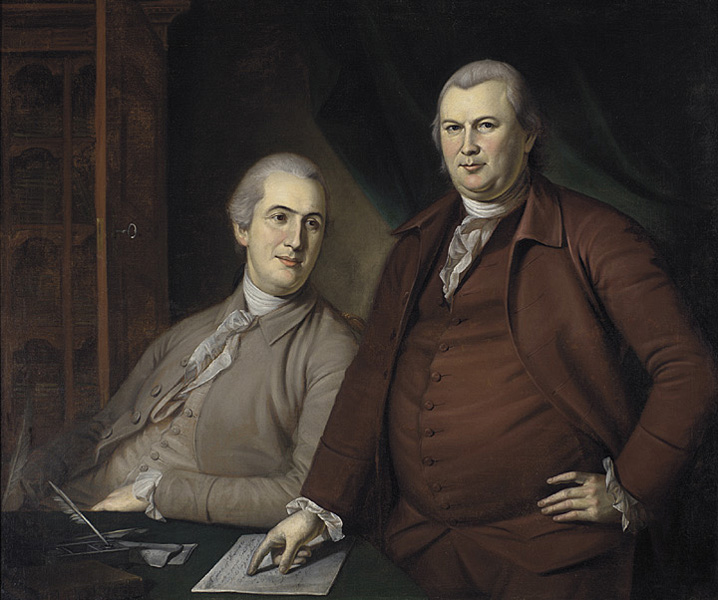
Painting of Gouverneur Morris and Robert Morris

In the midst of the American Revolutionary War, U.S. government finances fell into a poor state as Congress lacked the power to raise revenue and the states largely refused to furnish funding. Without a mechanism for raising revenue, Congress repeatedly issued paper money, leading to rampant inflation. By 1781, the U.S. faced an unremitting financial crisis, which was underscored by the January 1781 Pennsylvania Line Mutiny, in which ten poorly fed, unpaid Continental Army regiments demanded better conditions from Congress. Though the mutiny was put down, it convinced Congress to implement reforms that created the departments of war, marine, finance, and foreign affairs, each of which would be led by a departmental executive. By a unanimous vote, Congress selected Morris as the Superintendent of Finance. Morris accepted appointment as the Superintendent of Finance in May 1781, and he appointed Gouverneur Morris as his deputy.

Morris soon emerged as the key economic official in the country and became a leader of the Nationalist faction, an informal group of American leaders who favored a stronger national government. He also had effective control over foreign affairs until Robert R. Livingston was appointed as Secretary of Foreign Affairs later in the year. In September 1781, Morris reluctantly agreed to serve as the Agent of Marine, giving him civilian leadership of the Continental Navy. Congress filled the last of the executive positions in November, when Benjamin Lincoln accepted appointment as Secretary of War. Along with General Washington and Continental Congress secretary Charles Thomson, the three executives served as the leaders of the de facto first national executive branch in U.S. history; Morris assumed an unofficial role as the leading department secretary. All three executives, as well as Washington, aligned with the Nationalist faction, and they all cooperated to enhance the power of the national government. In mid-1782, Congress established standing committees to provide oversight to the executive departments; Morris supported the congressional reorganization, but to his dismay, his longtime foe Arthur Lee became the chairman of the committee overseeing the finance department.

Morris pursued an array of reforms designed to boost the economy; many of the reforms were inspired by the laissez-faire economic ideas of Adam Smith. Shortly after taking office, he convinced Congress to establish the Bank of North America, the first bank to operate in the United States. Such a bank had been discussed in the months prior to Morris's appointment, but the bank itself was organized along lines laid out by Robert Morris and Gouverneur Morris. It was established as a private institution governed by its investors but was subject to inspection by the Superintendent of Finance. The bank would take the national government's deposits, provide loans to Congress, and issue banknotes. Morris hoped that the bank would help finance the war, stabilize the nation's currency, and bring the country together under one unified monetary policy. As the bank would take some time to begin functioning, in 1781 Morris presided over the issuing of a new currency, referred to as "Morris notes," backed by Morris's own funds. Morris also convinced Congress to allow him to purchase all supplies for the Continental Army, and Congress required states to furnish funding rather than supplying goods like flour or meat.

By 1781, the Revolutionary War had become a stalemate between Britain and the United States. The British had concentrated their military operations in the Southern theater of the war, while leaving a large force garrisoned at New York City. In August 1781, Morris met with General Washington and the comte de Rochambeau, who were planning a joint Franco-American operation against the British forces. Morris raised over $1,400,000 on his own credit for the effort. He also redirected government funds to purchase supplies for Washington's march against British forces in Virginia, and he pleaded with state governments and the French government for further funding, with the final $20,000 needed coming from Morris's longtime collaborator, Haym Salomon. At the October 1781 Battle of Yorktown, Washington forced the surrender of the British army under the command of General Cornwallis. After the Battle of Yorktown, Britain essentially abandoned its campaign on land, but the naval war continued as Britain sought to cut the United States off from its sources of trade.

=== After Yorktown ===
Months after the Battle of Yorktown, Morris issued the "Report on Public Credit," an ambitious economic plan calling for the full payment of the country's war debt through new revenue measures. It included a head tax on slaves in the various states, but above all, he pushed for a federal tariff of five percent on all imported goods, which would require an amendment to the recently approved Articles of Confederation. Such an amendment would weaken the institution of slavery, and greatly strengthen the power of the national government, but the amendment process required the consent of each state, and many states were reluctant to alter the balance of power between the states and the national government. The Articles gave Congress the sole power to conduct foreign policy, but the states retained all power over funding; Congress had no independent power to raise funds, and lacked any mechanism to force states provide the funds that they owed to Congress. Writing to the state governors, Morris argued that it was "high time to reliever ourselves from the infamy we have already sustained, and to rescue and restore the national credit. This can only be done by solid revenue." By late 1782, all of the states but Rhode Island had agreed to back an amendment allowing the tariff, but that was enough to block the amendment. At that point in time Rhode Island was a slave state with over 3000 slaves, and some prominent citizens of that state were prolific slave traders, so Morris's proposals would have a double impact.

Though he was frustrated in the tariff battle, Morris continued to implement and propose other economic reforms. In January 1782, after receiving its charter from Congress, the Bank of North America commenced operations, and the bank's currency soon achieved wide circulation. Morris sought the establishment of a national mint to provide for a single coinage throughout the United States and proposed the first decimal currency, but Congress was unwilling to back this project. He appointed several receivers, including Alexander Hamilton, to help circulate banknotes, report on the prices of goods, and perform other functions in places throughout the United States. He also reformed government procurement of supplies, saving money by placing the onus for the storage and transport of supplies on government contractors.

=== Newburgh Conspiracy ===
Even after implementing several financial reforms, Morris was unable to pay the soldiers of the Continental Army. The chief issue, aside from the unwillingness of the states to amend the Articles of Confederation, was the unwillingness of the states to supply adequate funding; many states refused to furnish any funds at all. The Bank of North America provided some loans, but eventually refused to furnish more funds until previous loans were paid off. Morris's efforts were further complicated by France's reluctance to extend more loans, as well as a drop-off in American trade, caused in part by British naval operations. In December 1782, shortly after the apparent defeat of the proposed amendment to allow the national government to levy a tariff, General Alexander McDougall led a delegation that presented a petition for immediate payment on behalf of the Continental Army. While Morris helped temporarily defuse the crisis by offering the soldiers one month's pay, the petition reflected widespread unhappiness in the Continental Army at the continued lack of pay. Some Nationalists, including Gouverneur Morris, believed that only the discontent of the army could force the adoption of the amendment authorizing Congress to impose a tariff.

In March, Colonel Walter Stewart delivered the "Newburgh Address", in which he urged members of the Continental Army to rise up against Congress and demand payment. Washington prevented a mutiny by assuring the soldiers that they would eventually be paid. In the aftermath of the near-mutiny, Morris denied that he had played any role in fomenting insurrection. Nonetheless, most historians believe that Morris was one of three leaders of the Newburgh Conspiracy, along with Alexander Hamilton and Gouverneur Morris. Jack N. Rakove emphasizes the leadership of Robert Morris. However, this conclusion overlooks several exculpatory facts: Morris supplied $800,000 in his own notes to pay the soldiers in an effort to avoid discontent in the Army; the address was written by Major Armstrong, aide-de-camp to General Gates, both anti-Morris partisans; Armstrong went on to become a favorite of the Constitutionalists of Pennsylvania, who later made him their Clerk of the Assembly; and Morris's most bitter enemy, Arthur Lee, promoted articles published by anonymous partisans (probably Lee himself) in the Freeman's Journal, attacking Morris. Blaming Morris had all the ear-marks of an early misinformation campaign designed to shift the blame for a failed and unpopular mutiny.

=== National debt ===
Frustrated by his defeat in the tariff battle and the failure of states to provide adequate funding, Morris thought he was being forced to run up debts that the states were unwilling to pay. Writing that he would not be the "Minister of Injustice", he submitted his resignation in early 1783, but Hamilton and other Nationalists convinced him to stay in office.
As of January 1, 1783, the public debt was $42 million of which 18.77 percent was foreign debt and 81.23 percent was owned at home.
In a report to the President of Congress Morris wrote:

- Domestic Debt...$35,327,769

of which

- Loan Certificates...$11,463,802 [with two years interest loan due $877,828]
- Army Debt...$635,618.00

The rest being unliquidated debts, etc., interest. At roughly the same time, Morris and others in Philadelphia learned that the United States and Britain had signed a preliminary peace agreement, bringing an unofficial end to the Revolutionary War. Congress approved a furlough of the Continental Army soldiers, subject to recall in case hostilities broke out once again. Morris distributed "Morris notes" to the remaining soldiers, but many soldiers departed for their homes rather than waiting for the notes. After a mutiny over pay broke out in Pennsylvania, Congress voted to leave Philadelphia and establish a provincial capital in Princeton, New Jersey; the mutiny dissipated shortly thereafter. Nationalists were devastated by this turn of events, and Hamilton resigned from Congress in mid-1783 after his proposal for convention to revise the Articles of Confederation was ignored.

In November 1784, Morris resigned from his government positions. Rather than finding a successor for Morris, Congress established the three-member Board of Treasury, consisting of Arthur Lee, William Livingston, and Samuel Osgood. In 1778–1779 Morris had attempted to strengthen out the accounts of the old Commercial Committee but had to give it up; he stated in answer to Paine "the accounts of Willing and Morris with the committee had been partially settled, but were still partially open, because the transactions could not be closed up." The Treasury Board elected in 1794–1795 those old accounts were brought to a settlement—a June 1796 entry in the Treasury debt against Morris for $93,312.63. Morris would explain in 1800 in debtors' prison that in fact the debt was due not just to himself but also his partners John Ross and Thomas Willing.

== Later political career ==
=== Constitutional Convention ===
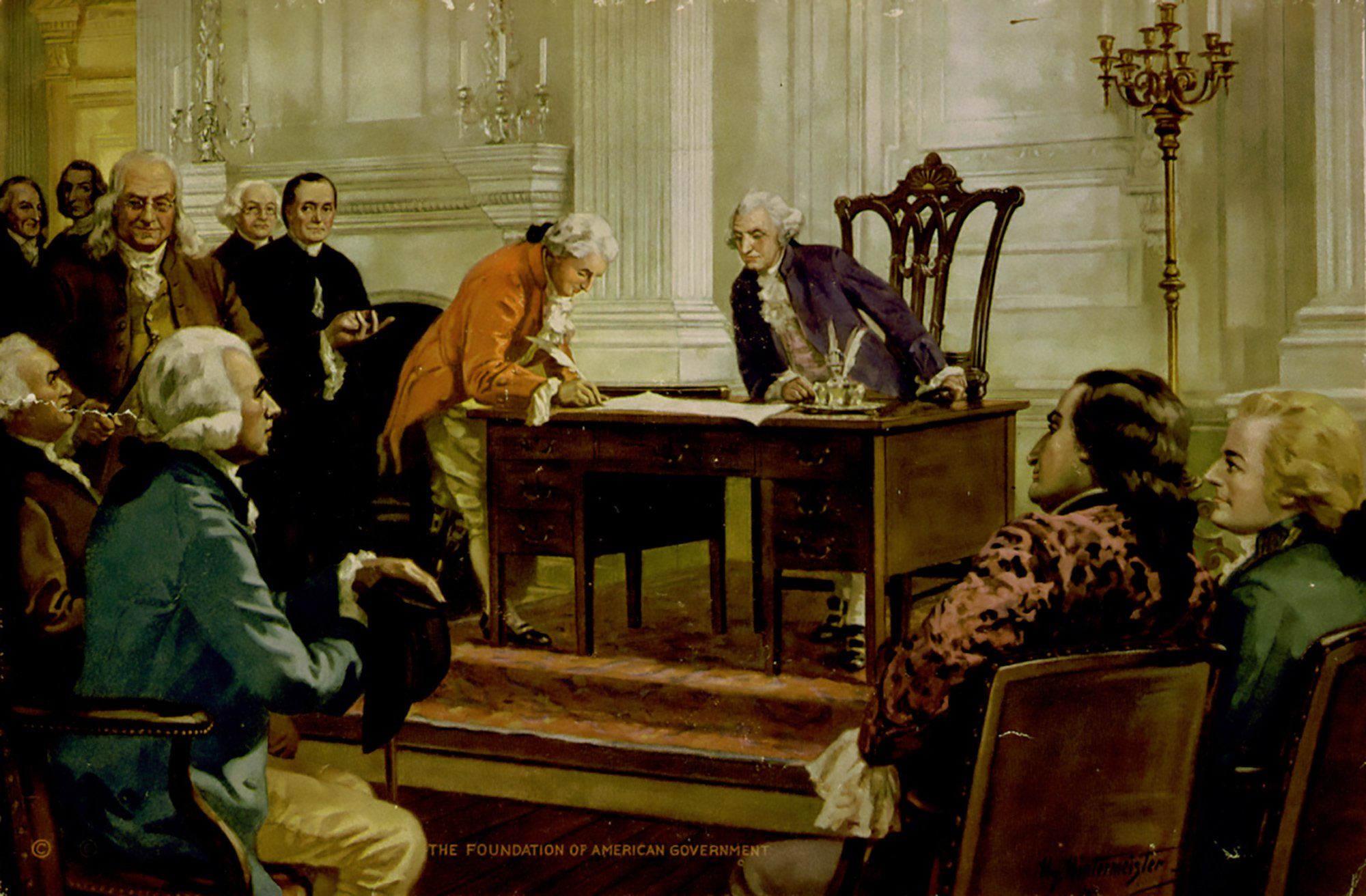
Foundation of American Government, by John Henry Hintermeister (1925). Robert Morris is far left, before Franklin. Gouverneur Morris signs the Constitution before George Washington.

After leaving office, Morris once again devoted himself to business, but state and federal politics remained a factor in his life. After the Pennsylvania legislature stripped the Bank of North America of its charter, Morris won election to the state legislature and helped restore the bank's charter. Meanwhile, the United States suffered a sustained recession after the end of the Revolutionary War, caused by the lingering debt burden and new restrictions on trade imposed by the European powers. Some members of Congress, including those on the Board of Treasury, continued to favor amendments to the Articles of Confederation, but the states still refused to authorize major changes to the Articles.

In 1786, Morris was one of five Pennsylvania delegates selected to attend the Annapolis Convention, where delegates discussed ways to reform the Articles of Confederation. Though Morris ultimately declined to attend the convention, the delegates convinced Congress to authorize a convention in Philadelphia in May 1787 to amend the Articles. The Pennsylvania state legislature sent a delegation consisting of Morris, James Wilson, Gouverneur Morris, George Clymer, Thomas Mifflin, Jared Ingersoll, and Ben Franklin to the Philadelphia Convention. With the exception of Franklin (who avoided aligning with either political faction in Pennsylvania), all of the Pennsylvania delegates were closely aligned with Morris's Republican faction, a reflection of Republican strength in the state legislature. Many of Morris's Nationalist allies from other states, including Hamilton, James Madison, John Dickinson, and Washington, would also attend the convention.

With Franklin ill, Morris opened the proceedings of the Philadelphia Convention on May 25. His motion to nominate Washington as chairman of the convention was backed by a unanimous vote. Morris consistently attended the meeting of the convention, but rarely spoke after the first day, instead allowing lawyers and others more experienced with the law to debate various issues. His primary goals, including a provision ensuring the federal government had the power to lay tariffs and taxes, were shared by the vast majority of delegates at the convention. On September 17, Morris signed the final document produced by the convention which, rather than amending the Articles, was intended to supplant the Articles as the new Constitution of the United States. Morris was one of just six individuals to sign both the Declaration of Independence and the United States Constitution. (Note: The other five individuals are George Clymer, Benjamin Franklin, George Read, Roger Sherman, and James Wilson. Morris and Sherman were the lone individuals to sign the Declaration of Independence, the Articles of Confederation, and the United States Constitution.)

Rather than seeking to block the new constitution, Congress simply forwarded it to each state to debate ratification. Morris's Republican faction, along with Federalist groups in other states, sought the ratification of the new federal Constitution. The Constitutionalists, who saw the new federal constitution as a threat to state sovereignty, joined with Anti-Federalists in other states in seeking to prevent the ratification of the Constitution. In elections held in October and November 1787, Morris's Federalist allies retained control of the state legislature and won a majority of the elections held to select delegates for the convention held to debate ratification of the Constitution. Due to a dispute with a business partner, Morris did not attend the ratification convention, which voted to ratify the Constitution in December 1787. By the end of 1788, the Constitution had been ratified by enough states to take effect. In September 1788, the Pennsylvania legislature elected Robert Morris and William Maclay, both of whom were aligned with the Federalists, as the state's first representatives in the United States Senate. (Note: In a drawing of straws, it was determined that Morris would be part of Senate class three and thus would serve a full six-year term, while Maclay would be part of Senate class one and thus would serve a two-year term.)

=== U.S. Senator ===
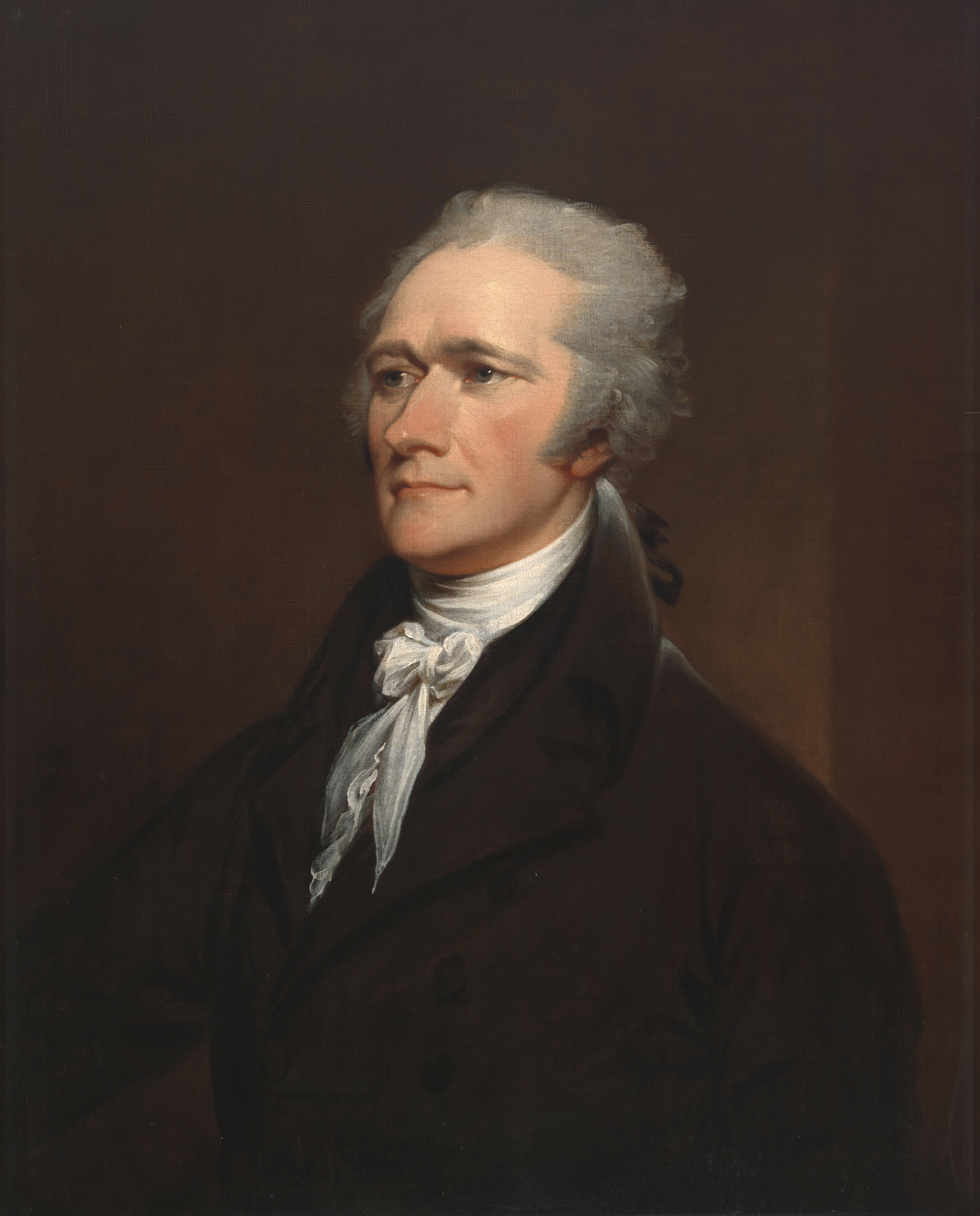
Morris recommended Alexander Hamilton for the position of Secretary of the Treasury.

In the country's first presidential election, Washington was elected as the President of the United States. Washington offered the position of Secretary of the Treasury to Morris, but Morris declined the offer, instead suggesting Alexander Hamilton for the position. In the Senate, Morris pressed for many of the same policies he had sought as Superintendent of Finance: a federal tariff, a national bank, a federal mint, and the funding of the national debt. Congress agreed to implement the Tariff of 1789, which created a uniform impost on goods carried by foreign ships into American ports, but many other issues lingered into 1790. Among those issues were the site of the national capital and the fate of state debts. Morris sought the return of the nation's capital to Philadelphia (Note: Congress had assembled at different locations after leaving Philadelphia in 1783. By 1789, the seat of the federal government was located in New York City.) and the federal assumption of state debts. Morris defeated Maclay's proposal to establish the capital in Pennsylvania at a site on the Susquehanna River west of Philadelphia, but James Madison defeated Morris's attempt to establish the capital just outside of Philadelphia.

Morris's 1781 "Report On Public Credit" supplied the basis for Hamilton's First Report on the Public Credit, which Hamilton submitted in 1790. Hamilton proposed to fully fund all federal debts and assume all state debts, and to pay for those debts by issuing new federal bonds. Hamilton argued that these measures would restore confidence in public credit and help to revitalize the economy, but opponents attacked his proposals as unfairly beneficial to the speculators who had purchased many of the government's debt certificates. Morris supported Hamilton's economic proposals, but the two differed on the site of the federal capital, as Hamilton wanted to keep it in New York. In June 1790, Secretary of State Thomas Jefferson convinced Morris, Hamilton, and Madison to agree to a compromise in which the federal government assumed state debts, while a new federal capital would be established on the Potomac River; until construction of that capital was completed, Philadelphia would serve as the nation's temporary capital. With the backing of all four leaders, the Compromise of 1790, as it became known, was approved by Congress. That same year, Morris and Maclay helped secure Pennsylvania's control of the Erie Triangle, which provided the state with access to the Great Lakes.

In the early 1790s, the country became increasingly polarized between the Democratic-Republican Party, led by Jefferson and Madison, and the Federalist Party, led by Hamilton. Though Morris was less focused on politics after the Compromise of 1790, he supported most of Hamilton's policies and aligned with the Federalist Party. Morris especially supported Hamilton's proposal for the establishment of a national bank. Despite the opposition of Madison and other Southern leaders, Congress approved the establishment of the First Bank of the United States in 1791. While Morris served in Congress, a new political elite emerged in Philadelphia. These new leaders generally respected Morris, but most did not look to him for leadership. With Morris playing little active role, they called a convention that revised the state constitution that included many of the alterations that Morris had long favored, including a bicameral legislature, a state governor with the power to veto bills, and a judiciary with life tenure. Morris also defeated the Pennsylvania "Test Laws" which disenfranchised religious minorities in the state, including Quakers, Anabaptists, and Jewish people. During his time as a public servant in both the Continental Congress (1775–1778): Morris held influential roles on key revolutionary committees, including:Secret Committee of Trade: Procured munitions and war supplies. Committee of Correspondence: Handled foreign affairs and secret negotiations. Marine Committee: Oversaw the creation and operations of the Continental Navy. With the U.S. Senate (1789–1795): He served on 41 committees and authored committee reports for 15 of them, focusing largely on trade and commerce.

== Later business career ==
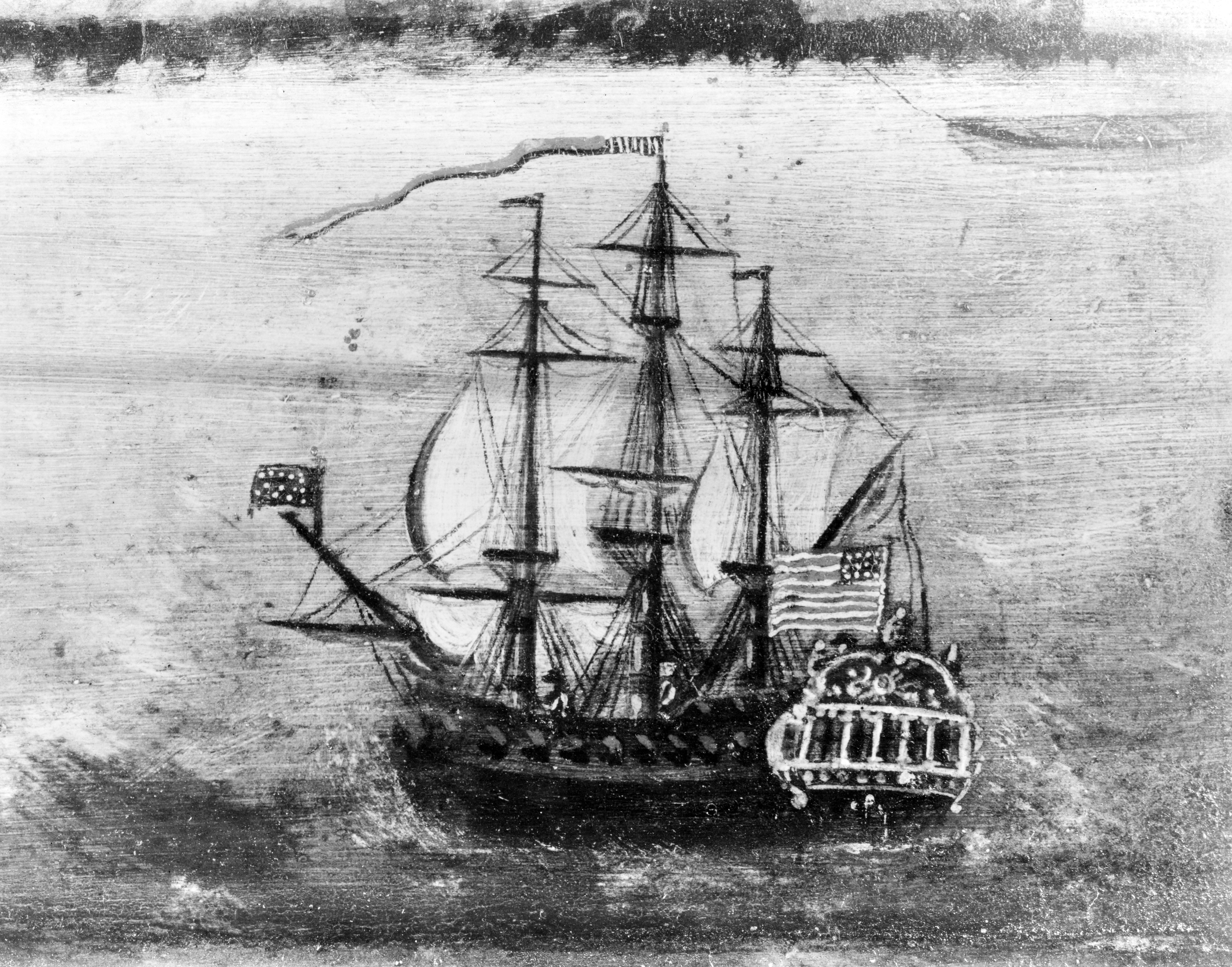
USS Alliance

Map showing the Phelps and Gorham Purchase

Morris refocused on his trading concerns after leaving office as Superintendent of Finance, seeking especially to expand his role in the tobacco trade. He began suffering from financial problems in the late 1780s after a business partner mistakenly refused to honor bills issued by Morris, causing him to default on a loan. In 1784 Morris was part of a syndicate that backed the sailing of the Empress of China (1783) for the China trade. (In 1787, Morris also sent the ex-warship Alliance to Canton, China as part of the China Trade.) As part of the effort to repay France for loans that financed the war, Morris contracted to supply 20,000 hogsheads of tobacco annually to France beginning in 1785. Shortly after these contracts were signed, Ambassador Thomas Jefferson took it upon himself to interfere with these arrangements, bringing about the collapse of the tobacco market. Financier James Swan on July 9, 1795, managed to do something Morris had been unable to do: the entire U.S. national debt to France of US$2,024,899 was paid in full. The United States no longer owed money to foreign governments, although it continued to owe money to private investors both in the United States and in Europe. This allowed the young United States to place itself on a sound financial footing.

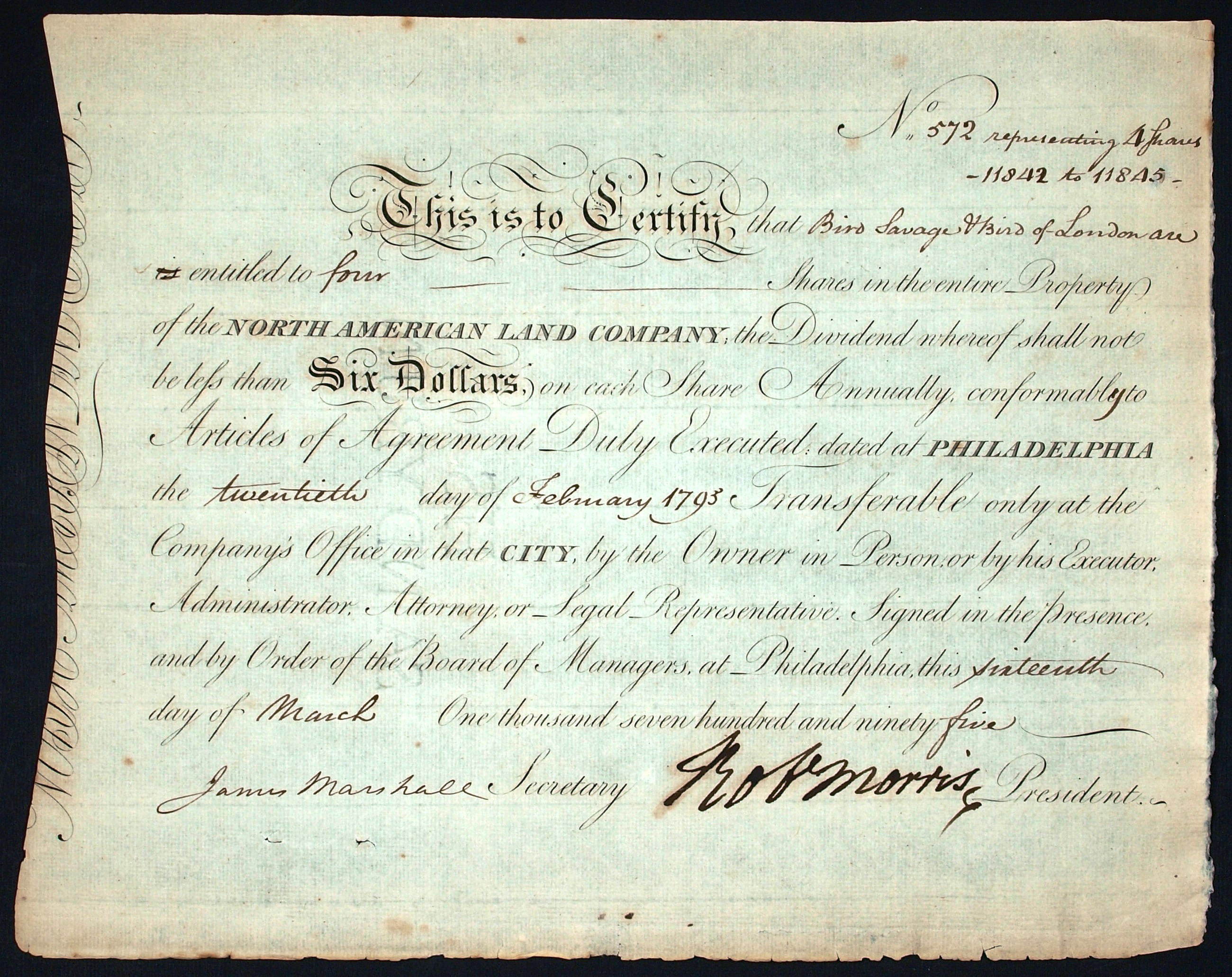
Share of the North American Land Company, issued March 16, 1795, signed by Robert Morris

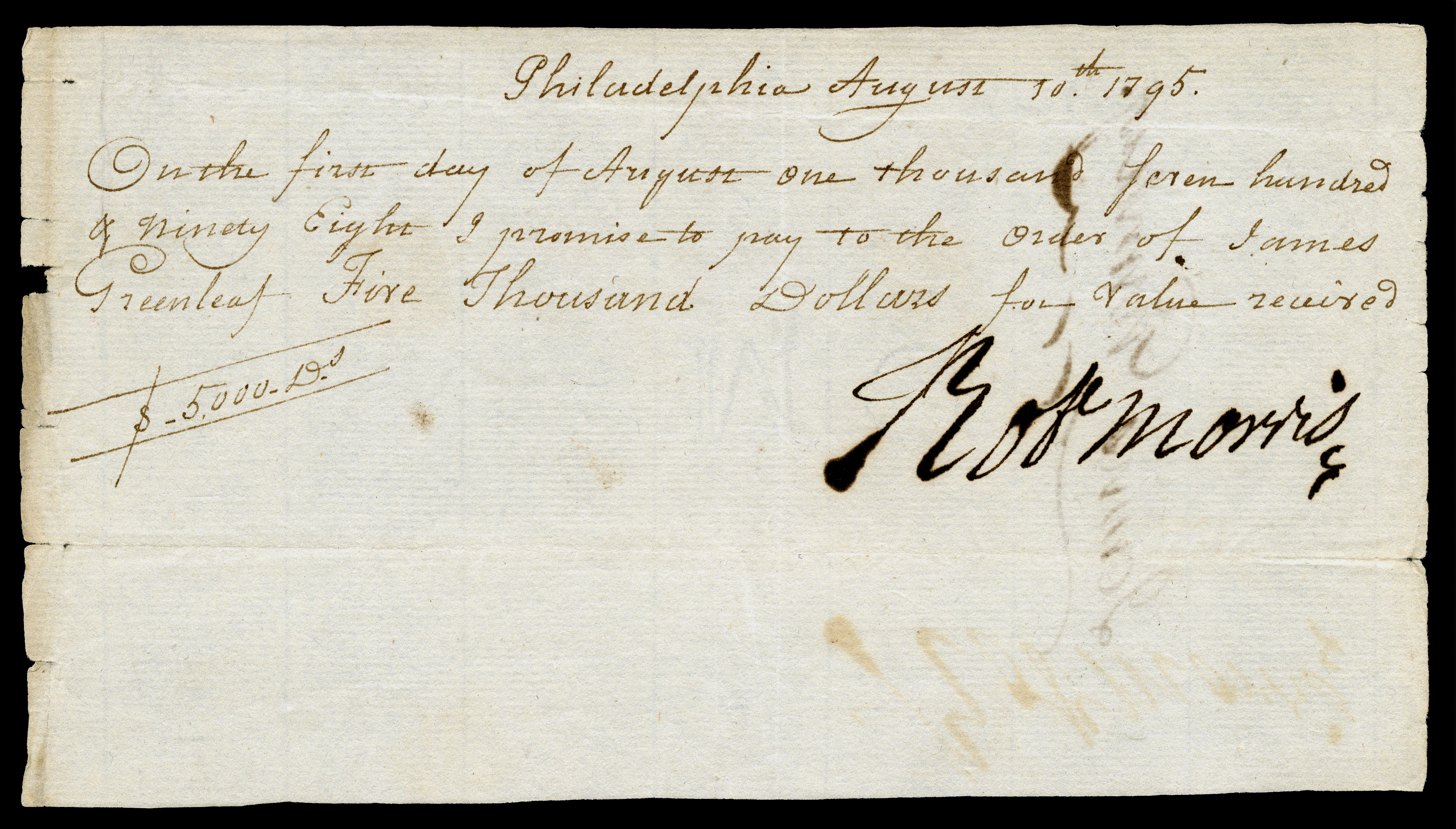
Check of August 10, 1795, by Robert Morris

From July 1778 to January 1780, Morris was agent, normally paid on commission, for John Holker (French consul general for the four states of Delaware, Pennsylvania, New York, and New Jersey). At the same time, he was appointed general agent of the Royal Navy of France, and, in this capacity, had to manage the logistics and finances of the French expeditionary force. In early 1780, they became partners in William Turnbull and Co. Turnbull had worked for the secret Pennsylvania Committee of Commerce and would manage operations on their behalf. In the monumental edition of the Robert Morris Papers, the list of Holker's associates (occasional or regular) is given in a note to volume 7. It is edifying: on the French side, Le Ray de Chaumont, Sabatier and Després, La Caze and Mallet, and the bankers Le Couteulx and Ferdinand Grand (Holker senior, Antoine Garvey, and Baudard de Saint-James, associate in Sabatier's business, are not listed). On the American side, three of the founding fathers, John Langdon, Thomas Fitzsimons, and Robert Morris, Simeon and Barnabas Deane, brothers of Silas Deane, William Duer, Matthew Ridley, Mark Pringle, Jonathan Williams Sr. and Jr., Stacey Hepburn, William Smith of Baltimore, and Benjamin Harrison V of Virginia are listed. Special mention for Philadelphia merchant Thomas Fitzsimons, one of the very few Catholic signatories of the Constitution, appreciated for his wisdom by both Holker and Morris, and who would serve as arbitrator in their disputes. In fact, Holker's French partners fell into a double trap: lured by their yield, they invested part of the transferred funds in Congressional loan certificates that yielded 6%, without realizing that these state funds would be transformed into junk bonds, and, strengthened by the reassuring words of the authorities, they convinced themselves that the currency would rise, while Morris, for his own account, did the exact opposite: he did not keep any cash and invested it as soon as he had some in goods; he thus avoided losses linked to currency depreciation. The blow of the club was delivered in March 1780: "Congress officially devalued "old emission" currency at a ratio of forty to one of species, thereby repudiating a significant proportion of the debt it represented". Holker's partners therefore suffered considerable losses, and they would fight in vain for years to obtain compensation. Chaumont, on the verge of ruin, had to request a decree preventing French creditors from seizing assets. After his resignation, Holker faced two challenges: settling his accounts with Robert Morris, and bouncing back to absorb the losses he had suffered. In January 1784, Morris submitted accounts, but the settlement would stumble over the claim for compensation for the depreciation suffered by Holker. Relations between the two partners deteriorated rapidly, and Holker wanted to appeal to the courts. This dispute would lead to a deterioration in Franco-American relations, the French side noting Morris' stiffening and becoming increasingly concerned about the repayment of debts contracted by the United States. The interests of a foreign government which was both ally and creditor expanded the dispute from the private realm into the public arena. Holker consulted Thomas Fitzsimons, and the latter explained to him that arbitration was preferable. This arbitration was entrusted to five Philadelphia merchants, including Fitzsimons himself; he would have to wait five years for it. The verdict of April 1789 exonerated Morris from any liability for the depreciations suffered, and finally decided that Holker owed Morris the very symbolic sum of 1,500 Pennsylvania pounds. In 1787, Morris was sued in Virginia by Carter Braxton for £28,257; the lawsuit continued for eight years before commissioners were appointed, then Morris appealed. Finally, Virginia's Court of Appeals led by Edmund Pendleton decided mostly in favor of Braxton before Morris was forced into bankruptcy by his own continued land speculations (although Morris as late as 1800 believed that he should have won £20,000). Morris became increasingly fixated on land speculation, reaching his first major real estate deal in 1790, when he acquired much of the Phelps and Gorham Purchase in western New York. He realized a substantial profit the following year when he sold the land to The Pulteney Association, a group of British land speculators led by Sir William Johnstone Pulteney. Morris used the money from this sale to purchase the remainder of the Phelps and Gorham Purchase, then turned around and sold much of that land to the Holland Land Company, a group of Dutch land speculators. These early successes encouraged Morris to pursue greater profits through increasingly large and risky land acquisitions.

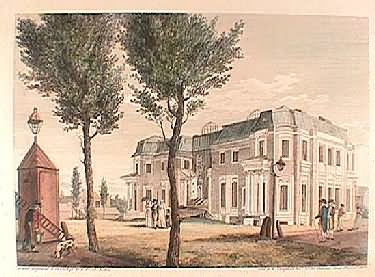
An engraving of the L'Enfant-designed mansion that became known as "Morris's folly"

On March 7, 1791, Morris obtained title to a lot from John Dickinson and wife; on March 9, 1793, the site was surveyed; it was not until 1794 that he began construction of a mansion on Chestnut Street in Philadelphia designed by architect of Washington, D.C., Pierre Charles L'Enfant; it was to occupy an entire block between Chestnut Street and Walnut Street on the western edge of Philadelphia. The structure was of red brick and marble lining. Besides Land Speculation, Morris founded several canal companies: similar to the Potomac Company, two Pennsylvania canal companies were set up to try to link the produce of the western lands with the eastern markets; they were the Schuylkill and Susquehanna Navigation Company, chartered September 29, 1791, and the Delaware and Schuylkill Canal Company, chartered April 10, 1792. Morris was president of both companies; he was also involved with a steam engine company and launched a hot air balloon from his garden on Market Street. He had the first iron rolling mill in America. His icehouse was the model for one Washington installed at Mount Vernon. He backed the new Chestnut Street Theater and had a greenhouse where his staff cultivated lemon trees. In early 1793, Morris purchased shares in a land company led by John Nicholson, the comptroller general of Pennsylvania, beginning a deep business partnership between Nicholson and Morris.

Later in 1793, Morris, Nicholson, and James Greenleaf jointly purchased thousands of lots in the recently established District of Columbia. They subsequently purchased millions of acres in Pennsylvania, Kentucky, Virginia, Georgia, and the Carolinas; in each case, they went into debt to make the purchases, with the intent of quickly reselling the land to realize a profit. Morris and his partners struggled to re-sell their lands, and Greenleaf dropped out from the partnership in 1795. Morris realized a profit by selling his lots in the District of Columbia in 1796, but he and Nicholson still owed their creditors approximately $12 million (about $228 million in 2025). By Morris's own admission the beginning of his bankruptcy began with the failure of John Warder & Co. of Dublin and Donald and Burton of London in the spring of 1793.

Morris was deeply involved in land speculation, especially after the Revolutionary War; (See Phelps and Gorham Purchase of 1791 above); on April 22, 1794, Morris entered into an association called the Asylum Company with John Nicholson, who had served as Comptroller-General of the state of Pennsylvania from 1782 to 1794, to purchase 1,000,000 acres of Pennsylvania land besides land they already had title to in Luzerne County; Northumberland County and Northampton County. This was not the first partnership Morris and Nicholson were involved in; in 1792, Nicholson had negotiated the purchase from the federal government of the 202,000-acre (820 km^{2}) tract known as the Erie Triangle. Along with an agent of the Holland Land Company, Aaron Burr, Robert Morris, and other individual and institutional investors, he formed the Pennsylvania Population Company. This front organization purchased all 390 parcels of land in the Erie Triangle. Nicholson was impeached in 1794 for his role in the company. However, Morris severely overextended himself financially. He had borrowed to speculate in real estate in the new national capital, District of Columbia, but signed a contract with a syndicate of Philadelphia investors to take over his obligations there. After that, he took the options to purchase over 6,000,000 acres (24,000 km^{2}) in the rural south. Unfortunately for Morris, that syndicate reneged on their commitment, leaving him once again liable, but this time with more exposure.

In 1795, Morris and two of his partners, Greenleaf and Nicholson, pooled their land and formed a land company called the North American Land Company. The purpose of this company was to raise money by selling stock secured by the real estate [i.e. to finance their land speculation business]. According to one historian of American land speculation, the NALC was "largest land trust ever known in America". The three partners turned over to the company land throughout the United States totaling more than 6,000,000 acres (24,000 km^{2}), most of it valued at about 50 cents an acre. In addition to land in the District of Columbia, there were 2,314,796 acres (9,367.65 km^{2}) in Georgia, 431,043 acres (1,744.37 km^{2}) in Kentucky, 717,249 acres (2,902.60 km^{2}) in North Carolina, 647,076 acres (2,618.62 km^{2}) in Pennsylvania, 957,238 acres (3,873.80 km^{2}) in South Carolina, and 932,621 acres (3,774.18 km^{2}) in Virginia. NALC was authorized to issue 30,000 shares, each worth $100. To encourage investors to purchase shares, the three partners guaranteed that a 6 percent dividend would be paid every year. To ensure that there was enough money to pay this divided, each partner agreed to put 3,000 of their own NALC shares in escrow. Greenleaf, Morris, and Nicholson were entitled to receive a 2.5 percent commission on any land the company sold. Greenleaf was named secretary of the new company. Other land speculations that Morris was involved in was the Illinois-Wabash Company and the Georgia Yazoo Land Company

=== Financial ruin ===
The Washington DC Lots were not the only land problems for Morris; he began losing everything for nonpayment on interest on loans and taxes. In May 1796, John Barker Church accepted a mortgage on another 100,000 acres of the Morris Reserve in present-day Allegany County and Genesee County, against a debt owed to him by Morris. After Morris failed to pay the mortgage, Church foreclosed, and Church's son Philip Schuyler Church acquired the land in May 1800. Philip began the settlement of Allegany and Genesee counties by founding the village of Angelica, New York. In a letter of September 1797 to his partner Nicholson, Morris begged to be able to find $500.00 to pay two years wages to his servant Mr. Richard; in a subsequent letter October 25, 1797, to Nicholson, Morris moaned that 200,000 acres of North Carolina land which had cost him $27,000.00 had been sold for one year's taxes. In regard to Morris's Philadelphia mansion L'Enfant was paid $9,037.13 between December 1795 and January 1799. Despite the spent amount of £6138 5s 10d it was never completed. The bank of Pennsylvania brought suit against him and a judgement made against him for $20,997.40; an execution against his unfinished Chestnut Street "Morris Folly" mansion was issued in September 1797 to Philadelphia Sheriff Baker; Sheriff Penrose on December 11, 1797, made deed-poll to William Sansom for the building and the lot sold for $25,600 subject to a £7,000 in specie mortgage payable to Messrs Willink of Amsterdam. The last credit for the house was July 2, 1801, and the last charge for it was made July 9, 1801. The unfinished mansion became known as "Morris's folly", and the land eventually became Sansom Street. Marble from this house was purchased by Latrobe; he used it to adorn buildings and monuments from Rhode Island to Charlestown, South Carolina.

The two canal companies had also failed. For example, after its incorporation, the Schuylkill and Susquehanna was subscribed for 40,000 shares, but only 1,000 shares were sold; the Delaware and Schuylkill company was to have been 2,000 shares at $200.00 a share. Operations were suspended because "Either on account of errors in plans adopted, failure to procure the necessary means, financial convulsions, or a combination of all these difficulties, they were compelled to suspend their operations after an outlay of $440,000, which was an immense sum in those days". When England and the Dutch declared war on Revolutionary France, an expected loan from Holland never materialized.

The French Revolution (1789 to 1799) ruined the market for American land and Morris's highly leveraged company collapsed. Lastly, the financial markets of England, the United States, and the Caribbean suffered from deflation related with the Panic of 1797. Morris was left "land rich and cash poor". He owned more land than any other American at any time, but did not have enough liquid capital to pay his creditors. Among his creditors was his son-in-law James Marshall for £20,000 sterling; likewise, his brother-in-law Bishop White was a creditor for $3,000. Governor Morris was owed $24,000 "exclusive of what he paid in Europe on my account, the amount of which I do not know". Henry Lee III was a creditor for protested bills for $39,446 plus damages and interest. Morris's wife Mary had a sum of credit of $15,860.16 from the sale of two farms left to her by her father. His daughter Esther Morris had a credit of a few hundred pounds left to her by her grandmother received by Morris; as Morris had given her on her marriage nothing but clothes and old wine, he assigned to her two quarter chests of tea which he sent to Alexandria, Virginia for sale, although he feared that this would not amount to principal and interest. His son Robert Morris Jr was a debtor for sums spent in Europe without his father's knowledge; his son Charles while under age had contracted bills without his father's knowledge for $144.94 for a tailor and $24.50 for a shoemaker. The NALC encountered financial difficulty almost immediately. Only 4,479,317 acres (18,127.15 km^{2}) of land was turned over to the NALC, which meant it could issue only 22,365 shares. This meant only 7,455 shares were put into escrow (instead of the required 9,000). Rather than paying creditors with cash, the NALC paid them with shares (8,477 shares in 1795 and 1796). On May 15, 1795, the D.C. commissioners demanded their first payment from Greenleaf, Morris, and Nicholson, for the 6,000 lots purchased in 1793. But Greenleaf had misappropriated some of the company's income to pay his own debts. Without the Dutch mortgage income and missing funds, there was no money to make the payment to the commissioners. Furthermore, Greenleaf had co-signed for loans taken out by Morris and Nicholson. When these men defaulted, creditors sought out Greenleaf to make good on the debts—which he could not.

Morris and his partners had failed to both pay the instalments on the Washington D.C. building lots and finished building twenty houses (they had contracted ten houses annually for seven years on said lots); On July 10, 1795, Morris and Nicholson bought out Greenleaf's interest in the December 24, 1793, agreement. The commissioners began legal proceedings to regain title to the 6,000 lots owned by NALC and the 1,115.25 lots owned by Greenleaf personally. The worsening financial problems of Greenleaf, Morris, and Nicholson led to increasingly poor personal relations among the three men. Nicholson, particularly bitter, began making public accusations against Greenleaf in print. Morris attempted to mediate between the two men, but his efforts failed. In an attempt to resolve his financial problems, Greenleaf sold his shares in the NALC to Nicholson and Morris on May 28, 1796, for $1.5 million. Unfortunately, Morris and Nicholson funded their purchase by giving Greenleaf personal notes. Furthermore, they endorsed one another's notes. Morris and Nicholson, themselves nearly bankrupt, agreed to pay one-quarter of the purchase price every year for the next four years. Greenleaf's shares were not to be transferred to Morris and Nicholson until the fourth payment was received. On September 30, 1796, James Greenleaf put 7,455 of his NALC shares in a trust (known as the "391 trust" because it was recorded on page 391 of the firm's accounting book). The "391 trust" was created to generate income (from the 6 percent dividend) to pay a loan given to Greenleaf by Edward Fox. A trustee was assigned to hold on to the shares. The same day, Greenleaf put 2,545 shares into another trust (the "381 trust"), as a guarantee against nonpayment of the dividend by Morris and Nicholson. Morris and Nicholson's made the first payment to Greenleaf for the one-third interest in the NALC by turning over title to several hundred lots in Washington, D.C. On March 8, 1797, Greenleaf executed the 381 trust.

When the NALC did not issue its 6 percent dividend, Greenleaf transferred one-third of the shares in the "391 trust" to the trustees. The total number of shares transferred to the "381 trust" trustees was now 6,119. On June 24, 1797, Morris, Greenleaf and Nicholson had conveyed their Washington D.C. Lots in trust to Henry Pratt and others in payments of their debts. Poor business practices were now dragging down NALC. For years, Morris and Nicholson had acted as personal guarantors for one another's notes. Now many of these notes were coming due, and neither man could pay them. Creditors began selling the notes publicly, often at heavy discounts. By 1798, Morris and Nicholson's $10 million (~$247 million in 2025) in personal notes were trading at one-eighth their face value. NALC also discovered that some of titles to the 6,000,000 acres (24,000 km^{2}) of land it owned were not clear, and thus the land could not be used for security. In other cases, NALC found it had been swindled, and the rich land it thought it owned turned out to be barren and worthless. Morris and Nicholson honestly believed that, if their cash flow problems were fixed, they could make payments on the property they owned, and their shares would be returned to them. This proved incorrect. On October 23, 1807, all stock in the company was sold at 7 cents on the dollar to the accountants managing the Aggregate Fund. In 1856, the Trustees of the North American Land Company held $92,071.87 (~$2.57 million in 2025). Morris and Nicholson's heirs sued to recover the stock and gain access to the income. The North American Land Company stayed in existence until 1872. An 1880 auditors report called the litigation "phenomenal ... the counsel for Morris and Nickerson pursued the fund for twenty-five years, seeking to obtain it from the trustees of the North American Company and the trusts which had been created from it, and also defending the money from the State in an attempt to sequestrate it. After all counsel fees and expenses, the amount available for division to the Morris interest was $9,692.49."

In 1797 Morris conveyed his household furniture to Thomas Fitzsimmons which was sold at public auction. What was left was lent to Mrs. Morris by Fitzsimmons and Morris son-in-law Marshall; all Morris had left in his house was some bedding, clothing, part of a quarter cask of wine; part of a barrel of flour, some coffee, a little sugar and some bottled wine which was the remainder from a cask he had given to his daughter Maria. Morris attempted to avoid creditors by staying outside the city at his country estate "The Hills", located on the Schuylkill River, but his creditors literally pursued him to his gate. Morris was sued by a former partner, James Greenleaf, who had been imprisoned for fraud and was serving time in debtors' prison. Unable to dodge his creditors and their lawyers, Morris was finally arrested. He was imprisoned for debt in Prune Street prison in Philadelphia from February 1798 to August 1801. Morris property Summerseat (Morrisville, Pennsylvania) would be sold in a Sheriff's sale on June 9, 1798, to George Clymer and Thomas Fitzsimmons for $41,000.00. In January 1799 Morris lamented to Nicholson of how a London firm had refused to accept his bill of lading £389 sterling "because the money in the hands of the party upon whom the bill was drawn had been attached by the owner of a bond given for payment of some lands in Georgia". 43 of the 100 acres of Morris estate "The Hills" was purchased in March 1799 by Henry Pratt for $14,654.00 (~$362,083 in 2025) for his country house Lemon Hill after the tearing down of Morris's old mansion; in turn the "Lemon Hill" estate became part of the foundation for Fairmount Park Philadelphia; one part of Morris property which had also been purchased in 1799 by William Cannard became part of the Sedgeley mansion-which ironically also in turn became part of Fairmont Park. Of his partners Geenleaf was released after being declared bankrupt in 1798; Nicholson died in prison in 1800. Morris wrote that the deceased Nicolson owned him $60,000 specie from all the entries and transactions but "With the purest intentions, he unfortunately he had laid a train that ended as it had done. I here say that he laid the train, because there are living witness that I opposed as soon as I knew it, although from infatuation, maddness or weakness, I gave away afterward."

== Final years ==
Morris was unable to pay his debts, and he remained in debtors' prison for three and a half years. Morris was released from prison in August 1801 after Congress passed its first bankruptcy legislation, the Bankruptcy Act of 1800 in part to get Morris out of prison. At the time of his release, three commissioners found that he had debts of $2,948,711.11; the proceedings were certified October 15, 1801, after 2/3 of his creditors agreed to the discharge of Morris. On December 4, 1801, a certificate of bankruptcy was confirmed, but he remained financially destitute. Governor Morris, who served as Robert Morris's representative to the Holland Land Company, was able to attach a provision to the sale of some land that gave Mary Morris a $1,500 (equivalent to $29,000 in 2025) per year annuity; this annuity allowed Mary to rent a small house in Philadelphia far away from the city center. One of the few assets Morris had left was his father's old worn out gold watch which he had inherited at the start of his career; Morris managed to leave this timepiece in his will to his son Robert Jr. Morris died on May 8, 1806, in Philadelphia. No public ceremonies marked his death. He was buried in the churchyard of Christ Church in Philadelphia.

== Legacy ==
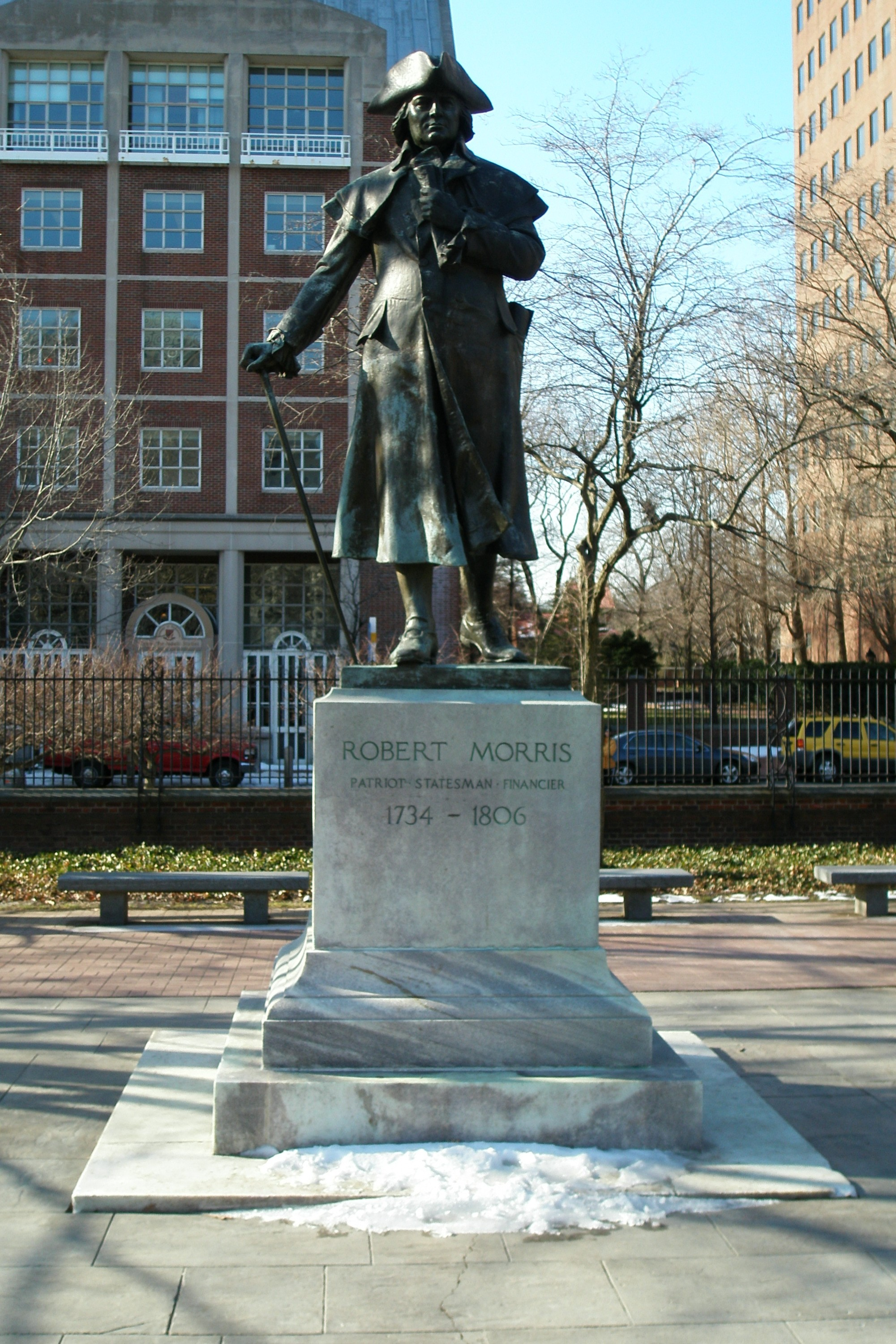
Statue of Robert Morris in Independence National Historical Park in Philadelphia

=== Historical reputation ===
Biographer Charles Rappleye writes that Morris "was too rich to be a folk hero, and the ultimate failure of his personal fortune robbed him of any Midas-like mystique." Some historians have largely ignored Morris's role in founding the United States, while others regard him as the leader of a conservative, anti-democratic faction of the Founding Fathers. Robert E. Wright and David J. Cowen describe Morris as a "fallen angel" who "almost single-handedly financed the final years" of the American Revolution before falling into "ignominy" for defaulting on his debts. Historian William Hogeland writes "given his seminal performance to victory in the Revolution, as well as to forming the nation, Robert Morris isn't as well known by Americans as he ought to be."

=== Memorials ===
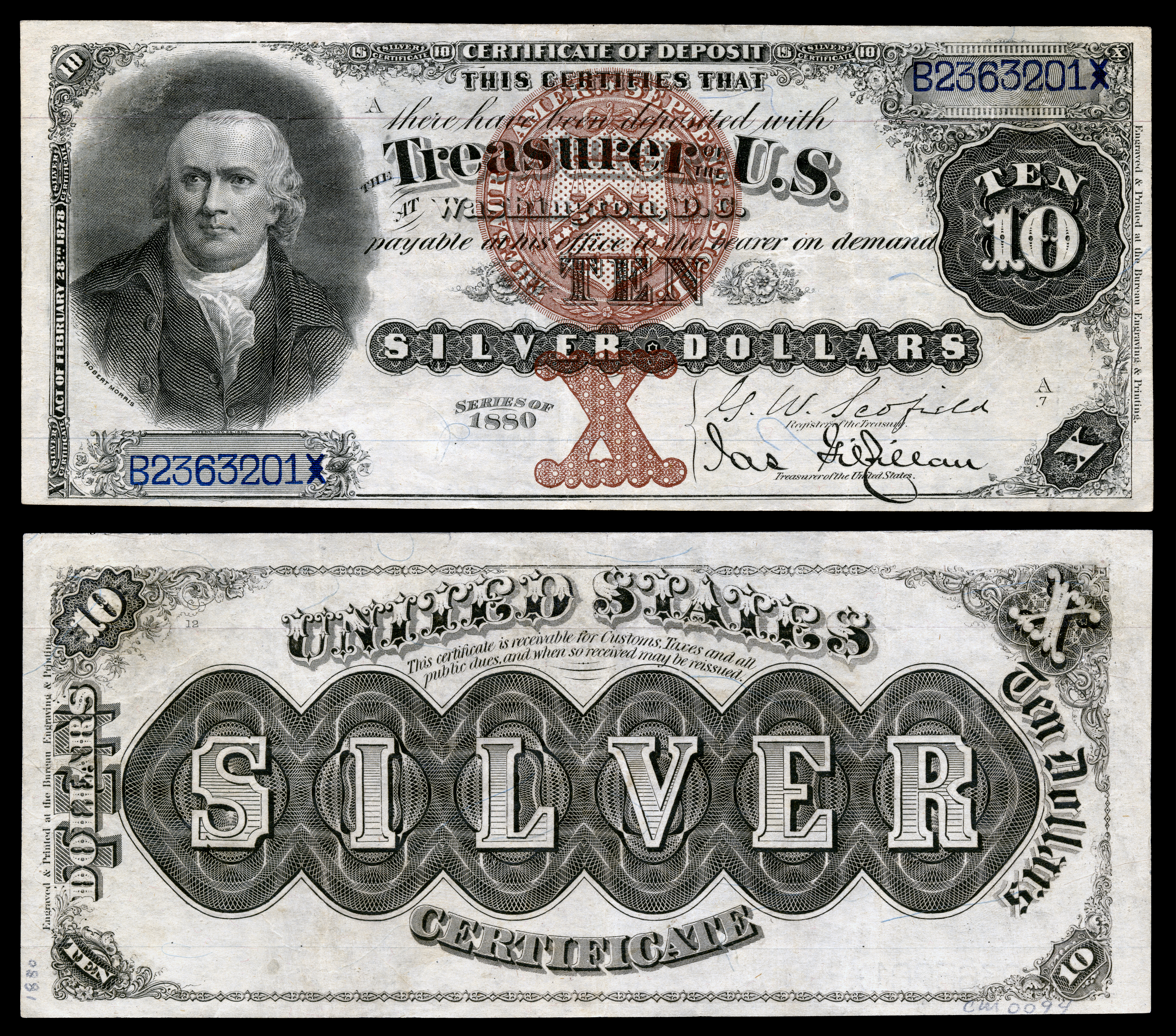
Morris on the $10 silver certificate

Morris's portrait appeared on US$1,000 greenbacks from 1862 to 1863 and on the $10 silver certificate from 1878 to 1880. Institutions named in honor of Morris include Robert Morris University and the Robert Morris Experiential College at Roosevelt University. Mount Morris, New York, the location of a large flood control dam on the Genesee River, is named in his honor. A number of ships in the U.S. Navy and the U.S. Coast Guard have been named USS Morris or USRC Morris for him. Morrisville, Pennsylvania, was named in his honor. The Morris-Taney-class cutter was named for Morris and Roger Taney. A statue of Morris stands at Independence National Historical Park, and a monument to Morris, Washington, and Haym Salomon stands at Heald Square in Chicago, Illinois.

Summerseat, Morris's former estate in Morrisville, is listed as a National Historic Landmark. Lemon Hill, a Federal-style estate listed on the National Register of Historic Places, is located on a parcel of land formerly owned by Morris. Part of the Liberty Bell Center is on land that was formerly part of the estate known as the President's House. Robert Morris holds the curious distinction as the only Founding Father whose house is a national memorial, but his life is not interpreted at the site.

Morris is included in the Washington, D.C., Memorial to the 56 Signers of the Declaration of Independence.

In April 2023, vandals wrote the words "Human Trafficer" on a Morris statue located at Independence National Historical Park (INHP) in Philadelphia. The INHP said the graffiti was written using felt marker, and the aged and weathered marble absorbed the markings. A material conservator used lasers to lighten the markings but was unable to remove them.

== See also ==
- List of richest Americans in history
- List of United States senators born outside the United States

== Bibliography ==
- Bordewich, Fergus M. (2016). The First Congress. New York: Simon & Schuster. ISBN 978-1-45169193-1.
- Chernow, Barbara Ann (1978). Robert Morris, land speculator, 1790–1801. New York: Arno Press. ISBN 0-405-11029-4. OCLC 3609086.
- Hogeland, William (2012). Founding Finance: How Debt, Speculation, Foreclosures, Protests, and Crackdowns Made Us a Nation. University of Texas Press. ISBN 9780292745759.
- Ferguson, E. James. Business, Government, and Congressional Investigation in the Revolution, (1959), JSTOR 1916947
- Ferguson, E. James. The Power of the Purse: A History of American Public Finance, 1776–1790 (1961) online
- Herring, William Rodney. "The Rhetoric of Credit, the Rhetoric of Debt: Economic Arguments in Early America and Beyond." Rhetoric and Public Affairs 19.1 (2016): 45–82.
- Kohn, Richard H. "The Inside History of the Newburgh Conspiracy: America and the Coup d'Etat." William and Mary Quarterly (1970) 27#2 pp: 188–220. JSTOR 1918650
- Lawler, Edward Jr. (2002). "The President's House in Philadelphia: The Rediscovery of a Lost Landmark". The Pennsylvania Magazine of History and Biography. 126 (1): 5–95. JSTOR 20093505.
- McGraw, Thomas K. (2012). The Founders and Finance. Harvard University Press. ISBN 9780674071353.
- Middlekauff, Robert (2007) [1982]. The Glorious Cause: The American Revolution, 1763–1789 (2nd ed.). Oxford University Press. ISBN 9780199740925.
- Oberholtzer, Ellis Paxson. Robert Morris, Patriot and Financier (Macmillan, 1903) online.
- Perkins, Edwin J. American public finance and financial services, 1700–1815 (1994). pp. 85–105 on Revolution, pp. 106–136 on postwar. Complete text line free
- Purvis, Thomas L. (1997). A Dictionary of American History. Wiley. p. 29. ISBN 978-1-57718-099-9.
- Rakove, Jack N. The beginnings of national politics: An interpretive history of the Continental Congress (Knopf, 1979) pp 297–330. online
- Rappleye, Charles (2010). Robert Morris: Financier of the American Revolution. Simon & Schuster. ISBN 978-1-4165-7091-2.
- Smith, Ryan K. Robert Morris's Folly: The Architectural and Financial Failures of an American Founder. New Haven, CT: Yale University Press, 2014.
- Ver Steeg, Clarence L. Robert Morris, Revolutionary Financier. Philadelphia: University of Pennsylvania Press, 1954. online
- Ver Steeg, Clarence L. "Morris, Robert" in American National Biography Online 2000.
- Wood, Gordon S. (2009). Empire of Liberty: A History of the Early Republic, 1789–1815. Oxford University Press. ISBN 9780199741090.
- Wright, Robert E.; Cowen, David J. (2006). Financial Founding Fathers: The Men Who Made America Rich. University of Chicago Press. ISBN 9780226910680.

=== Primary sources ===
- Ferguson, E. James (editor): The Papers of Robert Morris 1781–1784 (9 volumes): University of Pittsburgh Press, 1978; (1995 reprint: ISBN 0-8229-3886-3).

Political offices
New office	United States Superintendent of Finance; 1781–1784	Position abolished
U.S. Senate
New seat	U.S. Senator (Class 3) from Pennsylvania; 1789–1795; Served alongside: William Maclay, Albert Gallatin, James Ross	Succeeded by William Bingham
