= USRC Morris =

- A Morris-Taney class Revenue Cutter

History

United States
- Namesake: Robert Morris
- Builder: Webb and Allen, New York
- Commissioned: 1831
- Decommissioned: January 1847
- Homeport: Portland, Maine; Key West, Florida
- Fate: sold

General characteristics
- Class & type: Schooner
- Displacement: 112 tons
- Length: 73.4 ft (22.4 m)
- Beam: 20.6 ft (6.3 m)
- Draft: 9.7 ft (3.0 m)
- Propulsion: wind
- Complement: 20-24
- Armament: 6-9 pndrs

The United States Revenue Cutter Morris was one of 13 cutters of the Morris-Taney Class to be launched. Named after Secretaries of the Treasury and Presidents of the United States, these cutters were the backbone of the Service for more than a decade. Samuel Humphreys designed these cutters for roles as diverse as fighting pirates, privateers, combating smugglers and operating with naval forces. He designed the vessels on a naval schooner concept. They had Baltimore Clipper lines. The vessels built by Webb and Allen, designed by Isaac Webb, resembled Humphreys' but had one less port.

The Morris was named for Robert Morris, a Founding Father, Continental Congressman, and major financier of the American Revolutionary War. She began her career on a cruise from Maine to Sabine, Texas. On 20 October 1831, she arrived for duty at Portland, Maine. In May 1846, she sailed to Key West to participate in the Mexican War. On 11 October 1846, a hurricane drove Morris ashore three miles northwest of Key West. The following month, the Key West Collector of Customs received instructions to sell the vessel.
