= Greenleaf =

Greenleaf, Green Leaf or Green Leaves may refer to:

== Arts and entertainment ==
- Greenleaf (TV series), a 2016 American drama
- "Greenleaf" (short story), by Flannery O'Connor, 1956
- Greenleaf, Indiana, fictional setting of the film In & Out
- Green Leaves, a fictional Japanese boy band known for the song "Yatta"
- Legolas, a Lord of the Rings character, whose name is translated as "Greenleaf"
- Greenleaf (band), Swedish rock band

== Businesses and organizations ==
- Greenleaf Book Group, an independent book publisher and distributor
- Greenleaf Publishing, a British academic and professional publisher
- Greenleaf Publishing, founded by William Hamling in Chicago, U.S.
- Greenleaf Music, an independent American record label

== Places in the United States ==
- Greenleaf, Idaho
- Greenleaf, Kansas
- Greenleaf, Minnesota
- Greenleaf, Oregon
- Greenleaf, Wisconsin
- Greenleaf Lake (disambiguation)
- Greenleaf Lake State Recreation Area, Minnesota
- Greenleaf Peak, a mountain in the Cascade Range, Washington
- Greenleaf Point, former name of Buzzard Point, Washington, D.C.
- Greenleaf State Park, Oklahoma
- Greenleaf Township (disambiguation)

== Other uses ==
- Greenleaf (automobile), American automobile produced in 1900s
- Greenleaf (name), including a list of people with the name
- Greenleaf at Cheltenham, a shopping center in Philadelphia, Pennsylvania, U.S.
- Green Leaves, a historic house in Natchez, Mississippi, U.S.
- Ale Yarok ('Green Leaf'), a liberal political party in Israel
- Scaly-breasted lorikeet, or green leaf, a bird

== See also ==
- Green leaf volatiles, organic compounds released by plants
- Arctostaphylos patula, or greenleaf manzanita
- Chamaesaracha coronopus, or greenleaf five eyes, a plant in the nightshade family
- Eucalyptus chlorophylla, commonly known as green-leaf box
- Green warbler, or green leaf warbler, a bird
- Mills & Greenleaf, an American architectural firm
- "The Green Leaves of Summer", a 1960 song
