= Greenleaf Lake =

Greenleaf Lake may refer to:

- Greenleaf Lake (Le Sueur County, Minnesota), U.S.
- Greenleaf Lake (Meeker County, Minnesota), U.S.
- Greenleaf Lake (Oklahoma), U.S.

== See also ==
- Greenleaf (disambiguation)
