= Greenleaf (name) =

Greenleaf is a surname and given name. People with the name include:

== Surname ==
- Cat Greenleaf (born 1972), American TV reporter
- Diunna Greenleaf (born 1957), American blues singer and songwriter
- Elizabeth Bristol Greenleaf (1895–1980), American collector of folk songs
- Elizabeth Gooking Greenleaf (1681–1762), American apothecary
- Frank Greenleaf (1877–1953), Canadian sports administrator
- Halbert S. Greenleaf (1827–1906), American politician; spouse of Jean
- James Greenleaf (1765–1843), American land speculator
- Jean Brooks Greenleaf (1832–1918), American woman suffragist; spouse of Halbert
- Ralph Greenleaf (1899–1950), American pocket billiard champion
- Raymond Greenleaf (1892–1963), American actor
- Robert K. Greenleaf (1904–1990), founder of the modern Servant leadership movement
- Simon Greenleaf (1783–1853), American jurist
- Stephen Greenleaf (1628–1690), American politician and soldier
- Stewart Greenleaf (1939–2021), American politician
- William Greenleaf (born 1948), American science fiction author

== Given name ==
- Greenleaf Clark (1835–1904), American jurist and lawyer
- Greenleaf Whittier Pickard (1877–1956), American radio pioneer
- Greenleaf S. Van Gorder (1855–1933), American politician from New York
