= O'Neale =

O'Neale may refer to:

- Dion O'Neale, New Zealand applied mathematician
- Lila Morris O'Neale (1886–1948), American anthropologist and historian of textiles
- Rachid O'Neale (born 1991), Barbadian cricketer
- Royce O'Neale (born 1993), American professional basketball player
- Sarah O'Neale (née Thompson), fictional character from the Australian Channel Seven soap opera Home and Away
- Tug O'Neale, fictional character from the Australian Channel Seven soap opera Home and Away
- Walter O'Neale, D.D., Irish Anglican priest in the seventeenth to eighteenth century
- Benjamin O'Neale Stratford, 4th Earl of Aldborough (1746–1833), Irish peer and politician
- Margaret O'Neale Eaton (1799–1879), wife of John Henry Eaton, United States Senator and United States Secretary of War

== See also ==
- O'Neale v. Thornton, 10 U.S. (6 Cranch) 53 (1810), a ruling by the Supreme Court of the United States
- O'Neal
- O'Neill
- Neale (disambiguation)
