= Knox v. Greenleaf =

1802 United States court case

Knox v. Greenleaf, 4 U.S. (4 Dall.) 360 (C.C.D. Pa. 1802), is a ruling by the United States Circuit Court for the District of Pennsylvania which held that, under the Pennsylvania Constitution of 1790, citizenship of the state is conferred upon moving to the state and paying taxes.

== Background ==
James Greenleaf was an important speculator in land in many states in the United States in the late 1700s and early 1800s. After having lived in Washington, D.C., on April 15, 1795, Greenleaf purchased General Philemon Dickinson's house on Chestnut Street in Philadelphia for $28,000. Dickinson foreclosed on Greenleaf's home for nonpayment of the mortgage on November 29, 1797.

There was no national bankruptcy law; Congress would not pass one until the Bankruptcy Act of 1800. Greenleaf was therefore forced to apply for bankruptcy in each state where he had conducted business. He first applied for bankruptcy in Pennsylvania on March 10, 1798, although his debts were not settled and his case discharged until March 1804. He then applied for bankruptcy in Maryland on February 9, 1799, and his case was discharged on August 30. Competent testimony and the finding of the Maryland legislature both concluded that Greenleaf was, at the time he applied for Maryland bankruptcy, a citizen of Prince George's County, Maryland. Greenleaf returned to Philadelphia in February 1800. He moved to Northampton County, Pennsylvania, in June 1800. He paid taxes there, and never left the state. He was arrested under the federal bankruptcy law for insolvency and threatened with debtors' prison on February 20, 1801.

== Decision ==
The decision is unsigned. The court began by reciting the facts of the case briefly.

At issue was whether Greenleaf was a citizen of Pennsylvania. Knox's attorney argued that Greenleaf was an "inhabitant", but not a citizen, of Pennsylvania as he had already sought and received the protection of the state of Maryland. His 12-month inhabitation of the state of Pennsylvania did not qualify him for citizenship under Article 3, Section 1 of the Pennsylvania state constitution.

Alexander J. Dallas and Jared Ingersoll, attorneys for Greenleaf, argued that the United States Constitution made the citizen of one state a citizen of all states, but that each state was permitted under the Constitution to determine when a citizen could receive the benefits of citizenship. Pennsylvania's constitution, they said, left the issue of citizenship up to the United States. The only right of citizenship mentioned in the state constitution was the right to vote, and the residency requirements of Article 1, Section 3, only applied to standing for election. Furthermore, the bankruptcy laws of Maryland did not require a plaintiff to give up their citizenship in their home state.

In a single sentence lacking discussion, the Circuit Court and the jury declared Greenleaf a citizen of Pennsylvania.
