= Oliver Wight House =

Historic house in Massachusetts, United States

- U.S. National Register of Historic Places
- U.S. Historic district – Contributing property
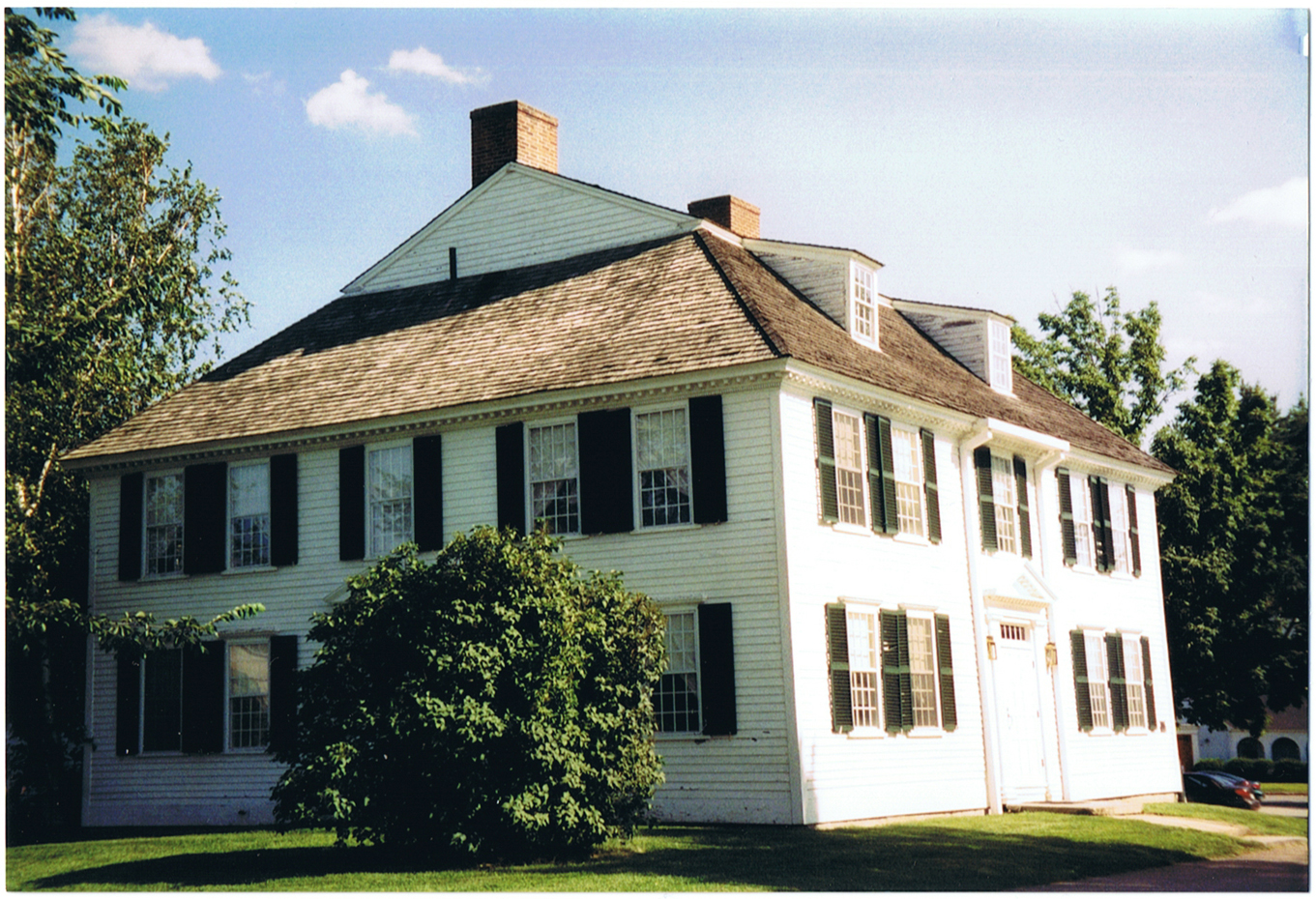
- North elevation of the Oliver Wight House

- Location within Massachusetts Location within the United States
- Location: Sturbridge, Massachusetts
- Coordinates: 42°6′41″N 72°5′22″W
- Built: 1789
- Architect: Wight, Oliver; Porter, Rufus
- Architectural style: Georgian
- Part of: Sturbridge Common Historic District (ID77000656)
- NRHP reference No.: 82004483

Significant dates
- Added to NRHP: June 1, 1982
- Designated CP: November 9, 1977

The Oliver Wight House is a historic house located on Main Street (U.S. Route 20) in Sturbridge, Massachusetts. Built in the 1780s, the house was first occupied by local cabinet maker Oliver Wight and his family. It was added to the National Register of Historic Places in 1982. The Georgian style dwelling was operated as a motor lodge by Old Sturbridge Village until 2006, and again from 2012-2020.

== History ==
Oliver Wight was born in Medway, Massachusetts on September 27, 1765. He married Harmony Child in Sturbridge on July 5, 1786, and they had eleven children, ten of whom survived to adulthood. Portraits of Oliver and Harmony Wight, attributed to the Beardsley Limner, can be found in the collections of the Abby Aldrich Rockefeller Folk Art Museum at Colonial Williamsburg. Oliver Wight died in Sturbridge on October 22, 1837.

Oliver Wight acquired his property in Sturbridge from his father, David Wight, and built his house near those of his father and his brothers, David Jr. and Alpheus. In addition to the house, he constructed a sizable shop on the property, where he engaged in his craft.

A cabinet maker by trade, Oliver Wight made chairs, tables, chests of drawers, bedsteads, and other wood furniture. He created pieces on commission and sold his work locally. Despite his abilities, he struggled with insolvency for much of his life. An article in the Massachusetts Spy in September, 1793, advertised a public auction of his finished pieces and household goods, as he had “absconded.” His Sturbridge farm was offered for sale in 1795. In 1802, Oliver Wight was declared a bankrupt.

Ebenezer Howard, another cabinet maker, bought the property from Oliver Wight and operated it as a tavern. He resided there until his death. Thereafter, George Wight, great grand-nephew of Oliver Wight, occupied the house. It remained in the family until A. B. Wells purchased it in 1937.

The Oliver Wight House underwent major renovation of its heating and plumbing systems in 1948, in preparation for becoming a sales and visitor center for Old Sturbridge Village. In 1950, Wells and his associates decided to make the Oliver Wight House into a motor lodge, and had several motel units built. It continued in this capacity until 2006, when it was closed to the public. The Oliver Wight House served as temporary office space for the town of Sturbridge while the town hall underwent renovations in 2009. The Oliver Wight House reopened as the Old Sturbridge Inn & Reeder Family Lodges in 2012, but closed again during the COVID-19 pandemic. Old Sturbridge Village named their Oliver Wight Tavern to recognize the historic use of the nearby Oliver Wight House as a tavern (restaurant).

== Art and Architecture ==
The original portion of the Oliver Wight House is a five bay Georgian style dwelling with a hipped-gable roof. An ell at the rear of the house was added later. It has two internal chimneys and clapboard facing. Each of the exterior doors are flanked by pilasters and topped with an entablature. An early twentieth-century account of the house describes its layout as a tavern with a bar room and a dance hall, as well as diamond pane windows. All of these features were gone by 1937.

The walls of the first floor hall are decorated with a mural in muted tones created by noted American folk artist Rufus Porter. These were likely painted during Ebenezer Howard's ownership. Motifs include rolling hills dotted with houses, a windmill, a steamboat on a river, and a variety of vegetation.

== Images ==
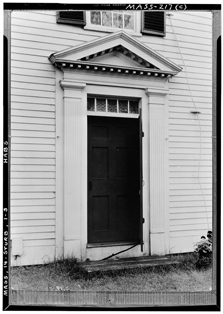
The original door on the Northeast side of the Oliver Wight House, photographed in 1937

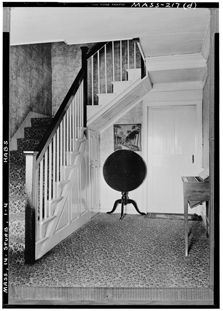
Main stairwell in the Oliver Wight House, viewed from the first floor (1937)

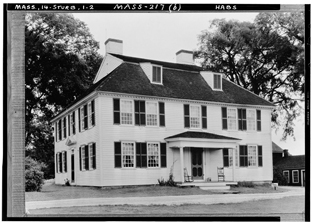
1937 View of the front and side of the Oliver Wight House

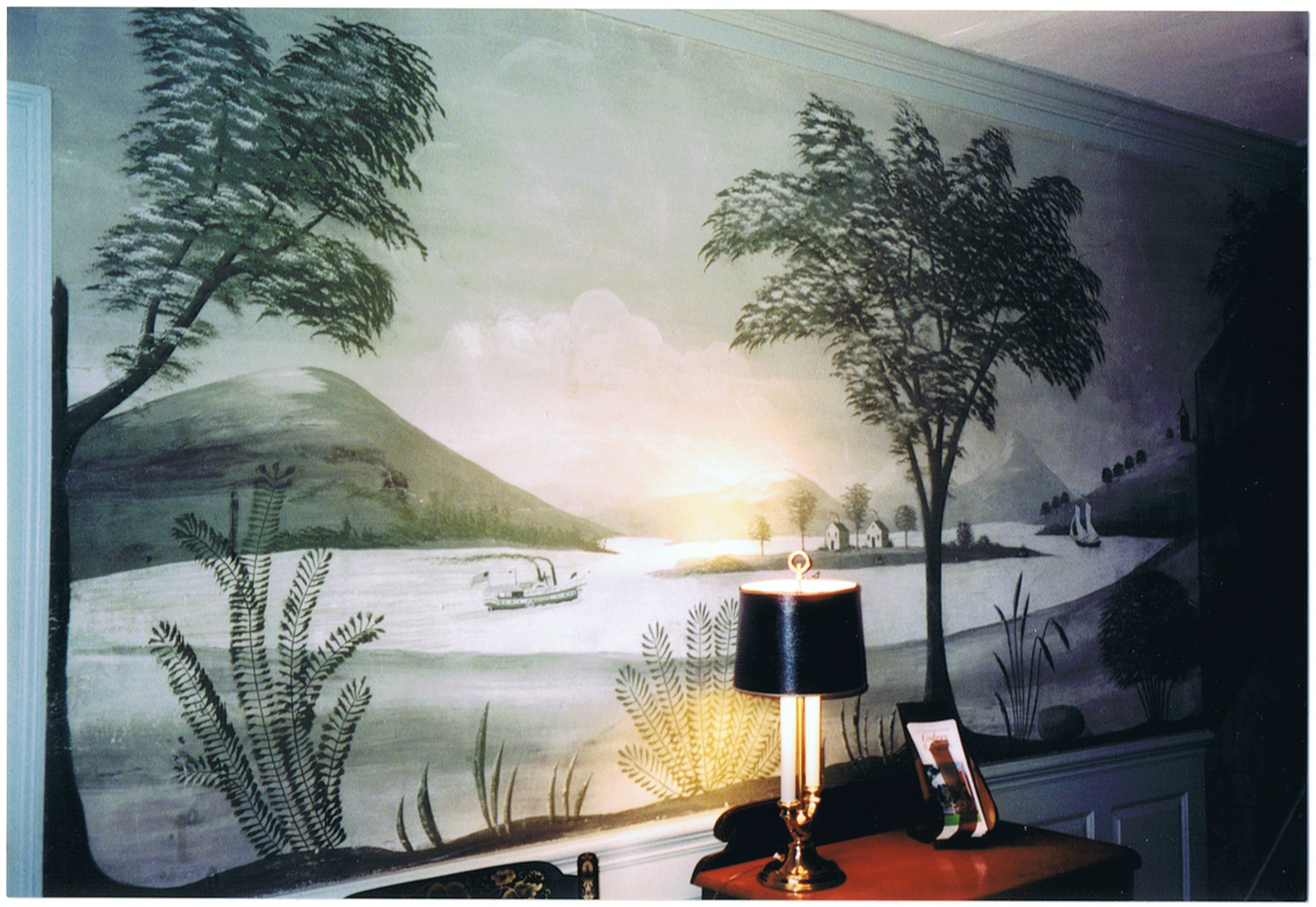
Portion of a mural done by Rufus Porter in the hall of the Oliver Wight House

== See also ==
- National Register of Historic Places listings in Worcester County, Massachusetts
