= Greenleaf Lake State Recreation Area =

Recreation area in Minnesota, United States

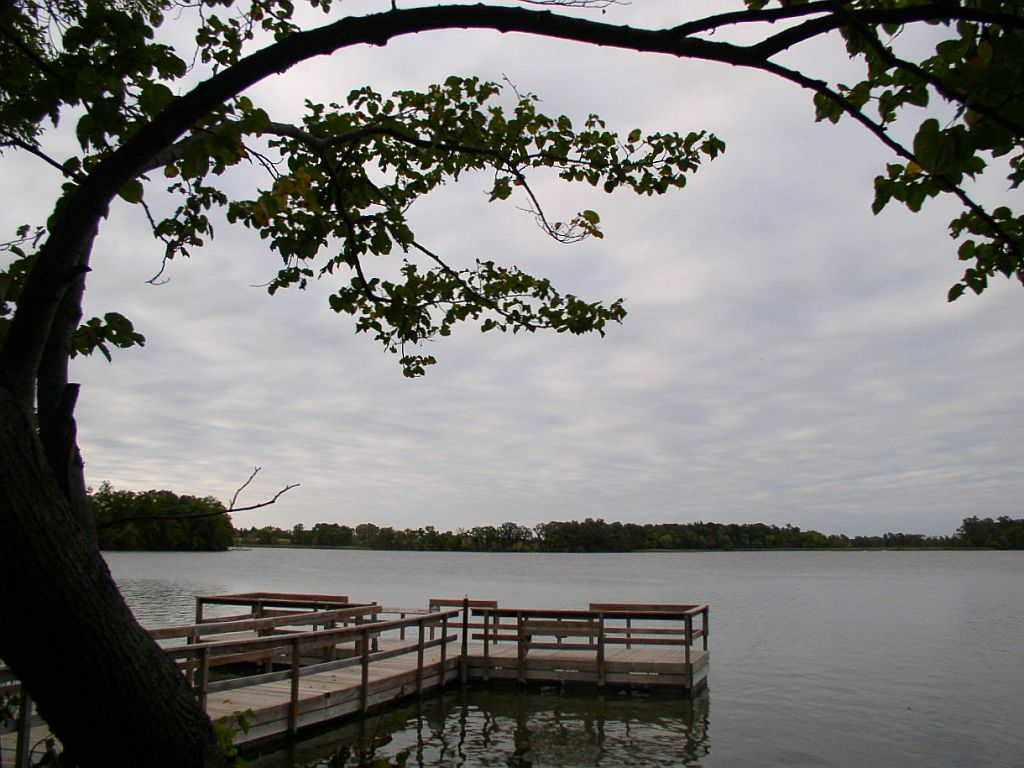
- Development is centered around an existing public water access

- Location within Minnesota Location within the United States
- Location: Meeker, Minnesota, United States
- Coordinates: 45°0′57″N 94°28′0″W
- Area: 1,230 acres (5.0 km^{2})
- Elevation: 1,083 ft (330 m)
- Established: 2007
- Governing body: Minnesota Department of Natural Resources

Greenleaf Lake State Recreation Area is a state park unit of Minnesota, USA, currently in development. It includes undeveloped shoreline on both Greenleaf and Sioux Lakes, halfway between the cities of Hutchinson and Litchfield in Meeker County. Portions of the state recreation area (SRA) are open to the public for day-use recreation, but there are no facilities yet on site. The park boundaries were set by the Minnesota Legislature and the state is still acquiring land from willing sellers; two-thirds of the property remain privately owned.

== Geography ==
Greenleaf Lake State Recreation Area is situated on the south end of the interconnected Greenleaf and Sioux Lakes, encompassing most of the peninsula between them. The 1,230 acres (500 ha) legally designated include 3.1 miles (5.0 km) of shoreline on Greenleaf Lake and 5.7 miles (9.2 km) on Sioux Lake. This is nearly half of the lakes' natural shoreline. Their outflow drains into three other lakes before reaching the South Fork of the Crow River, a tributary of the Mississippi River. The SRA is 10 miles (16 km) northwest of Hutchinson and 10 miles (16 km) southeast of Litchfield.

== Natural history ==
Greenleaf Lake State Recreation Area is characterized by rolling topography supporting northern hardwood forest, wetlands, grasslands, and croplands. The peninsula and island bear an unusual forest type for Minnesota: rock elm and American elm mixed with basswood, green ash, bur oak, and red oak. The southwest shore of Greenleaf Lake bears an open bur oak woodland with some basswood, green ash, red oak, hackberry, and bitternut hickory. While most of these habitats are secondary forest, some tracts of old-growth forest remain. The elm forest was protected from most wildfires by the lakes, and was minimally affected by the Dutch elm disease outbreak in the 1970s.

Both lakes exhibit good water quality, through Greenleaf Lake has been prone to intense algal blooms. The shallower Sioux Lake is attractive to waterfowl, while Greenleaf supports game fish like panfish and smallmouth bass.

== Wildlife ==
Bird and mammalian species include bluebird, raccoon, various owls, white-tailed deer, sandhill crane, muskrat, six species of duck, loon, beaver, snipe, red and gray fox species, mink, coyote, skunk, five species of falcon, badger, three species of hawk, river otter, two species of swan, opossum, and wild turkey in abundance.

== Cultural history ==
Greenleaf Lake State Recreation Area has not been closely surveyed for Native American cultural sites. Following Euro-American settlement the prairie and some of the woodlands and wetlands were farmed.

=== Park creation ===
In 1985 Mark Geyer — a resident of suburban Hennepin County, Minnesota — purchased property on Greenleaf Lake as an outdoor retreat for his family. In 1990 he and other landowners opposed a real estate developer's plan to build a lakeside housing complex, and Geyer arranged to buy the land instead. At the time Greenleaf was one of the last two undeveloped lakes in Meeker County. Geyer continued to buy additional acreage as it became available, intent on preserving the area. In the late 90s he heard the Minnesota Department of Natural Resources (DNR) was hoping to add a state park in Meeker or McLeod County and Geyer suggested his property.

After a few years of discussion, the Minnesota Legislature authorized Greenleaf Lake State Park in 2003 and appropriated $500,000 to buy property from Geyer and other willing landowners. However the DNR claimed it did not have the funding to run its existing parks, much less plan, develop, and maintain a new one, and the project languished. In March 2007 the DNR and legislature reached a compromise, reestablishing Greenleaf Lake as a state recreation area for lower operation and maintenance costs. At the same time DNR officials began eagerly negotiating to establish Lake Vermilion State Park in northern Minnesota, prompting criticism from Greenleaf Lake supporters that "the DNR bureaucrats in St. Paul did not really care that much about a state park in Meeker County." In December 2007 the first parcel was purchased from Geyer's 386 acres (156 ha). The Meeker County board of commissioners and the nonprofit organization Minnesota Parks & Trails Council stepped in with additional funds for the $3.2 million deal. The transfer of the rest of Geyer's property is expected to be completed in early 2012, with further acquisitions within the designated boundaries as funds and willing sellers arise.

Until park development begins in earnest, the state is leasing 86 acres (35 ha) for farming.

== Recreation ==
Greenleaf Lake State Recreation Area is within an hour drive of the Minneapolis–Saint Paul urban population and is being planned for high day-use. In addition to hiking, fishing, mountain biking, cross-country skiing, and snowshoeing, much of the SRA will be open to hunting. Planned developments include a picnic area, hiking trails, campground, camper cabins, hunting blinds, and an interpretive center.

Currently the SRA can be accessed via an existing public water access on Greenleaf Lake. This includes a fishing pier and parking area. Greenleaf Lake has been stocked with largemouth bass, black crappie, bluegill, northern pike, and walleye. 1 mile (1.6 km) of trail is open to non-motorized use. Hunting for deer, turkey, pheasant, and small game is being allowed in season.
