= James Greenleaf =

American land speculator in 18th–19th centuries

- Portrait by Gilbert Stuart, c. 1795
- Born: June 9, 1765; Boston, Province of Massachusetts, British America
- Died: September 17, 1843 (aged 78); Washington, D.C., U.S.
- Occupation: Land speculator
- Known for: Developing Washington, D.C.

James Greenleaf (June 9, 1765 – September 17, 1843) was a late 18th and early 19th century American land speculator responsible for the development of Washington, D.C., after the city was designated as the nation's capital following passage of the Residence Act in 1790. A member of a prominent and wealthy Boston family, he married a Dutch noblewoman, who he later abandoned and then divorced, and served briefly as consul at the United States embassy in Amsterdam.

After his return to the United States, Greenleaf engaged in land speculation in Washington, D.C., New York state, and other areas. His land business collapsed in 1797, and he spent a year in debtor's prison. He married a wealthy Pennsylvania heiress after his release, and spent the remainder of his life in genteel poverty, fending off lawsuits.

== Early life and education ==
Greenleaf was born on June 9, 1765, in Boston, Massachusetts to William and Mary (Brown) Greenleaf. He was the 12th of 15 children. His father William Greenleaf was a merchant who was appointed Sheriff of Suffolk County, Massachusetts during the American Revolutionary War.

Greenleaf was a member of the committee of correspondence, which communicated secretly with other cities regarding British policy and military actions and was a core base of support for the American Revolution. In July 1776, following the signing of the Declaration of Independence, Greenleaf announced American independence from the balcony of the Old State House in Boston. Among the crowd assembled for the announcement in Boston were John Quincy Adams and William Cranch. Adams was later elected President of the United States; Cranch was appointed as Chief Justice of the U.S. Circuit Court for the District of Columbia and the second Reporter of Decisions of the U.S. Supreme Court. The Greenleafs were Huguenots who fled France for England, seeking to escape religious persecution. They anglicized their family name of Feuillevert to Greenleaf. Greenleaf's great-grandfather Edmund was born in 1574, in Ipswich in Suffolk, England. His great-grandfather Stephen was born there in 1628. The entire family emigrated to Newbury, Massachusetts in 1635.

The Greenleaf family was among the best connected in early American history. Greenleaf's sister Rebecca married Noah Webster, who compiled the first American dictionary. Another of his sisters married Nathaniel Appleton, the minister and trustee of Harvard University. His sister Margaret married Thomas Dawes, a member of the Massachusetts Governor's Council, and his sister Abigail married William Cranch. The family's descendants also played a large role in American literature. The poet John Greenleaf Whittier was descended from James' great-grandfather Stephen. The 20th century poet T. S. Eliot was a descendant of Abigail Greenleaf Cranch. However, little is known about Greenleaf's early life or education. In 1781, when he was 16, his father retired from business and the Greenleaf family moved to New Bedford, Massachusetts.

== Career ==
In 1788, Greenleaf left Massachusetts and moved to Philadelphia, where Noah Webster introduced him to businessman James Watson. The two men established an import business, Watson & Greenleaf, with offices in Philadelphia and New York City.

After his business was incorporated, Greenleaf traveled to the Netherlands in the mid to late 1780s, where he tried to sell American bonds. According to John Quincy Adams, who was in Amsterdam at the same time, Greenleaf rented a magnificent mansion and immediately began circulating in high society in the city. Greenleaf was in Amsterdam from January 31, 1789, through August 1793, where he conducted business with Daniel Crommelin & Sons, a major Dutch investment banking house marketing American bonds. He sold nearly two million bonds during this time and $160,000 worth of stock in the Bank of the United States, a central bank established by the U.S. federal government. He amassed a fortune worth $1 million, a very large sum at the time.

=== Washington, D.C. land speculation ===
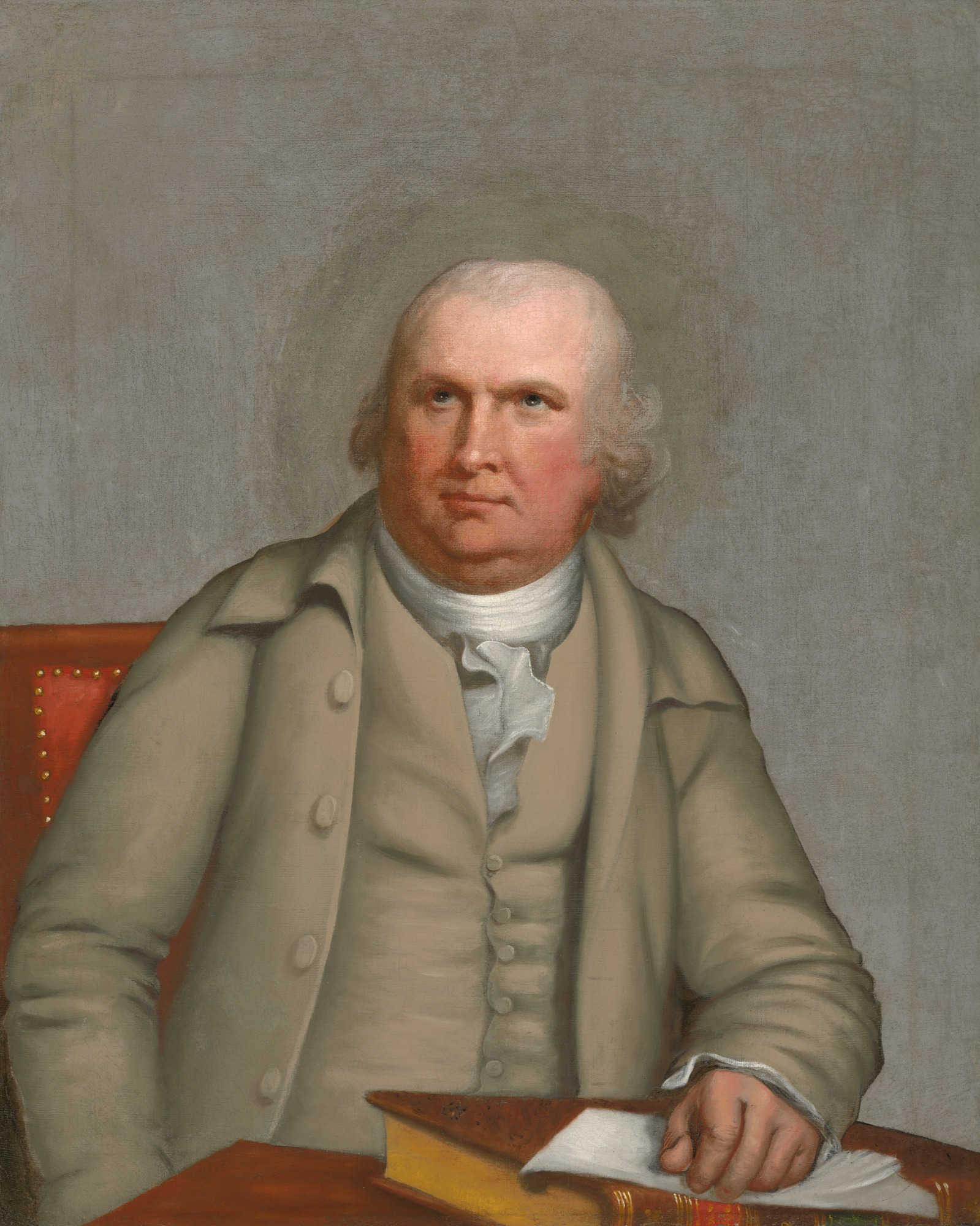
Robert Morris, Greenleaf's partner in land speculation

Greenleaf arrived in Washington, D.C., on September 17, 1793 and was present at the laying of the cornerstone of the United States Capitol the following day, on September 18, 1793 at which time Greenleaf met President George Washington.

Greenleaf quickly ingratiated himself with several of Washington's closest friends, including Tobias Lear, who served as Washington's secretary from 1785 to June 1793. Greenleaf provided seed money for Lear's mercantile venture, Tobias Lear & Co., in 1793. Greenleaf also associated with Thomas Johnson, who Washington had appointed as one of three commissioners of the District of Columbia. Greenleaf purchased 15,000 acres (61 km^{2}) of Johnson's land in Frederick County, Maryland for $14,000 in September 1793.

The Residence Act of 1790, which established the site for the nation's capital, provided for the appointment of three commissioners by the President without the need for Senate confirmation to govern the Washington, D.C., survey its land, purchase property from private landowners, and construct federal buildings. On September 23, 1793, Greenleaf purchased 3,000 city lots from the commissioners. The city offered him the lots at $66.50 each, a significant discount from the going price of $200 to $300 per lot. To secure this below market price, Greenleaf was required to construct 70 homes on the lots before 1800, not sell any of the land before 1796, and lend the commissioners $2,200 a month until certain public buildings were constructed. To raise money to improve the lots, Greenleaf executed a power of attorney on November 2, 1793, with Sylvanus Bourne, the American vice consul in Amsterdam. Bourne, who served as vice consul in Amsterdam under Greenleaf, was empowered to sell lots or obtain mortgages on them.

On November 19, 1793, Greenleaf moved into the Pearl Street home of Noah Webster in New York City.

The September 23 agreement with the commissioners was superseded by a subsequent agreement on December 24, 1793, with Greenleaf and his new business partner, Robert Morris. Morris was a Philadelphia merchant and one of 56 signatories to the Declaration of Independence and also to the Articles of Confederation and the United States Constitution. He was Chairman of the Pennsylvania Committee of Safety during the Revolutionary War, a delegate to the Second Continental Congress, and was appointed Superintendent of Finance for the U.S. Next to General George Washington, Morris was considered "the most powerful man in America." At the time he became Greenleaf's business partner, Morris also was one of Pennsylvania's original U.S. senators (his term ended in 1795).

=== Morris and Nicholson partnership ===
Map of New York state showing the Phelps and Gorham Purchase, Morris Reserve, and other tracts

Greenleaf first approached his existing business partner, James Watson, with an offer to finance the purchase of the lots and the construction on them. Watson declined, and Greenleaf dissolved their partnership. Greenleaf then turned to Morris, then the richest man in America and a speculator in millions of acres of land.

Morris was already one of the most important land speculators in the Northeast. He purchased the western portion of the Phelps and Gorham Purchase. an area of western New York consisting of about 3,750,000 acres (15,200 km^{2})—in March 1791 for $366,333.33. This area became known as Morris Reserve. Morris quickly sold 1,000,000 acres (4,000 km^{2}) of the reserve to The Pulteney Association in March 1791 for £75,000 for a profit of $216,128. This tract became known as the "Pulteney Tract".

Morris' association with Greenleaf started in February 1792, when Morris sold 100,000 acres (400 km^{2}) of the Morris Reserve to Greenleaf, Watson, and Andrew Craigie for £15,000 ($37,500). Morris sold another 1,000,000 acres (4,000 km^{2}) to the Holland Land Company between December 1792 and July 1793 for £112,500, and his son sold 1,800,000 acres (7,300 km^{2}) to the Holland Land Company for $500,000. Morris sold another 87,000 acres (350 km^{2}) (known as "the Triangle Tract") to an investor group in January 1793. By 1794, Morris was also an investor in the Virginia Yazoo Company, which was leveraging its political influence to purchase vast tracts of land from the state of Georgia (in what is the modern state of Mississippi) at low prices for land speculation.

Greenleaf and Morris purchased 6,000 lots under the same conditions as the September agreement. At least 1,500 of these lots were required to be in the northeast quadrant of Washington, D.C., but Greenleaf could take his pick of lots anywhere else in the city for the remainder. The monthly loan to the commissioners also increased to $2,660 per commissioner per month. An additional clause required that the 6,000 lots include 428.5 lots on Buzzard Point owned by Notley Young, a plantation owner in Prince George's County, Maryland, and 220 lots on Buzzard Point owned by Daniel Carroll, a Founding Father and Maryland landowner whose plantation became part of the District of Columbia. The contract also included provisions identical to those in the September 23 contract, which required no down payment, did not require the first payment until May 1, 1794, required only annual payments of one-sixth of the total amount of the purchase price annually thereafter, and did not impose any interest. With these transactions, Greenleaf and his co-investors controlled about half the federal government's sellable land in Washington, D.C.

The December 24 contract with the city provided that Greenleaf and Morris could bring in a third partner, although the requirement to construct buildings was not binding on this partner. The partner they brought in was John Nicholson, who had served as comptroller general of Pennsylvania from 1782 to 1794. In 1792, Nicholson negotiated the purchase from the federal government of the 202,000-acre (820 km^{2}) tract known as the Erie Triangle. Along with an agent of the Holland Land Company, Aaron Burr, Robert Morris, and other individual and institutional investors, he formed the Pennsylvania Population Company. This organization, in turn, purchased all 390 parcels of land in the Erie Triangle. Nicholson was impeached in 1794 for his role in the company.

=== Financial strains and New York land speculation ===
Greenleaf continued to expand his land holdings, purchasing 2,101 acres (8.50 km^{2}) of Anacostia River waterfront from various owners in December 1793, and 295 acres (1.19 km^{2}) near Alexandria, Virginia, in 1794. He also purchased 239.25 lots east of Georgetown from local landowners Uriah Forrest and Benjamin Stoddert. Another 1,000 lots of Notley Young's land were transferred to Greenleaf on April 24, 1794. Greenleaf relied on his brother-in-law, Nathaniel Appleton, for assistance with his land purchases. But when Appleton fell ill in September 1794, Greenleaf summoned his brother-in-law and friend William Cranch to Washington, D.C., to act as his sales agent. Greenleaf bought out Watson's 25% interest in the Morris Reserve tract but was forced to sell his shares in the land to Oliver Phelps before the end of 1794.

Greenleaf's construction activities meant that, by 1794, he owned one third of the buildings for sale in Washington, D.C. Among the buildings he began constructing in that year were the four townhouses that became known as Wheat Row.

To finance these land acquisitions and construction activities, Greenleaf turned to Dutch financiers. Sources differ on whether Greenleaf traveled to the Netherlands in 1794 or stayed in Philadelphia and New York City during the year. Whichever is the case, he was able to convince the Dutch government to pass legislation appointing agents and advocates for his business affairs. They began offering mortgages on the 6,000 Washington, D.C., lots. The guardians were authorized to accept mortgages not exceeding two million guilders ($8 million). But by July 1795, only 20,000 guilders ($80,000) had been raised. Greenleaf's friend Sylvanus Bourne attempted to find mortgages in Rotterdam, but was unsuccessful. Seeking a million guilders in loans, he secured just 150,000 guilders ($60,000).

=== Land deal with Aaron Burr ===
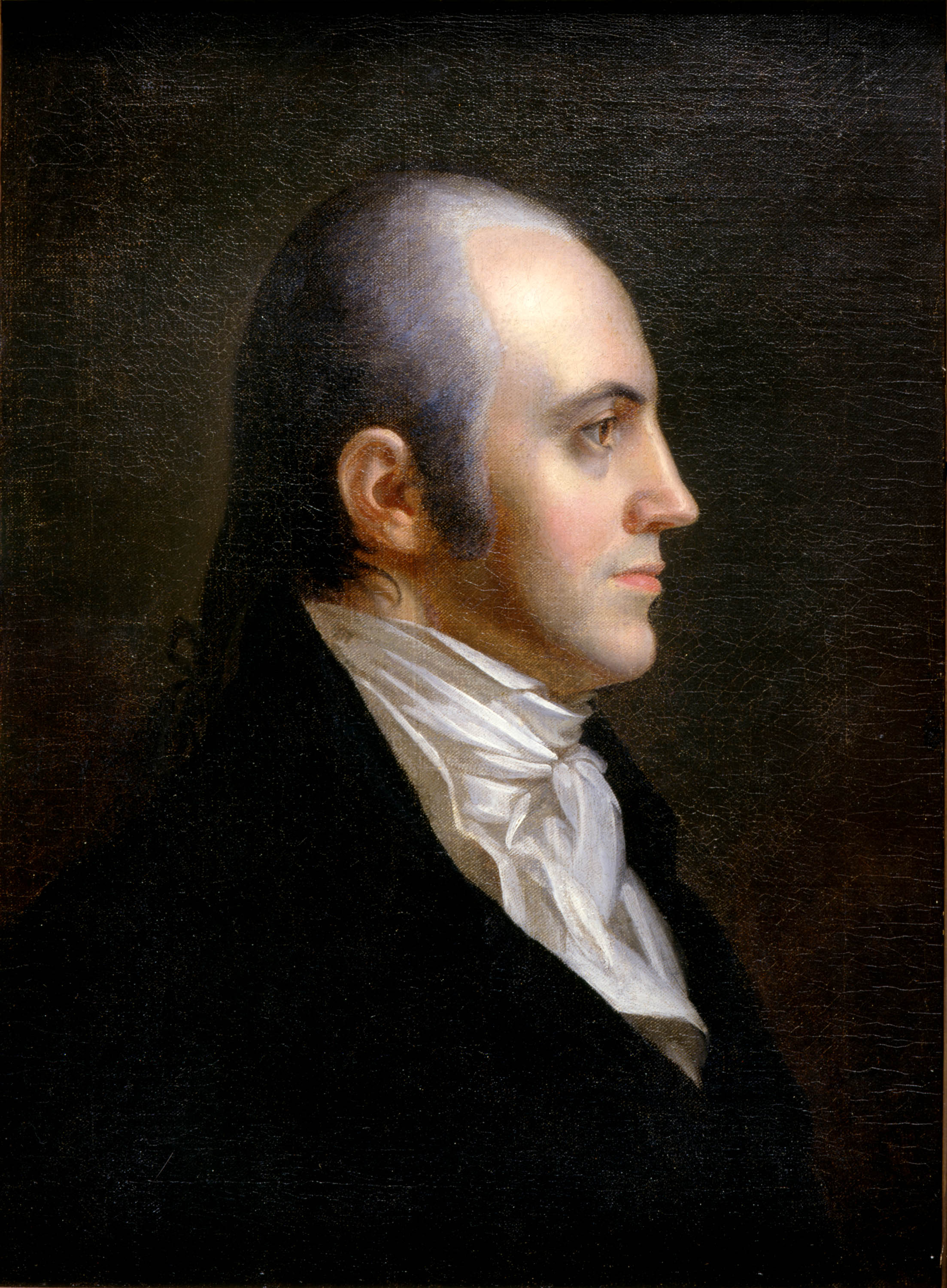
Aaron Burr in 1802

Greenleaf continued to be active in land speculation in New York state in addition to his speculation elsewhere in the U.S. In 1791, New York merchant Alexander Macomb purchased 4,000,000 acres (16,000 km^{2}) from New York state, a tract known as "Macomb's Purchase". Macomb sold 2,000,000 acres (8,100 km^{2}) to William Constable for £50,000 (in dollars). Six months later, Constable sold 1,000,000 acres (4,000 km^{2}) to banker Samuel Ward for £100,000 (in dollars). Constable and Ward agreed to sell 2,000,000 acres (8,100 km^{2}) to the British land speculator John Julius Angerstein. But New York state barred non-citizens from owning property in the state, so Constable and Ward argued that if the law was not changed they would buy the land back from Angerstein. The problem was that neither Constable nor Ward had the funds to do so. William Stephens Smith, son-in-law of President John Adams, held power of attorney for Angerstein, and in September 1794 he convinced Aaron Burr to buy 210,000 acres (850 km^{2}) of Angerstein's land for £24,000. Smith, in an obvious conflict of interest, assured Burr that he would provide half the sale price. But Smith withdrew from the purchase, leaving Burr to come up with the entire amount. Burr could not afford to do so. Either Ward or Burr (sources are unclear) sought out Greenleaf for financial assistance.

On November 25, 1794, Greenleaf agreed to contribute £12,000 (about $500,000 in 2012 inflation-adjusted dollars) to help Burr purchase Angerstein's land. Constable and Ward conveyed the deed to Greenleaf in December 1794. But Greenleaf was deep in debt. He purchased a cargo of tea from Rhode Island merchant John Brown, whose family funded and lent its name to Brown University. Greenleaf paid for the cargo partly in cash, and took out a mortgage with Philip Livingston in 1795 on the Angerstein land to pay for the remainder. But the purchase agreement with Constable and Ward/Angerstein barred the land from being mortgaged. Greenleaf then defaulted on his agreement to help Burr. Burr was facing the loss of his own £12,000 as well as the Angerstein property. Angerstein was unhappy as well, upset that Ward had sold 210,000 acres (85,000 ha) and that Greenleaf had mortgaged the property. Angerstein hired attorney Alexander Hamilton, who had just resigned as Secretary of the Treasury, to press his case. A series of suits and countersuits lasting years followed, causing increasingly bad feelings between Burr and Hamilton. Burr dueled with Hamilton over other issues on July 11, 1804, killing Hamilton. Greenleaf was unable to make his mortgage payments on the Angerstein land, and Livingston foreclosed in December 1798. Brown bought the mortgage for $33,000. These 210,000 acres (85,000 ha) became known as Brown's Tract.

=== U.S. consul to the Netherlands ===
On March 2, 1793, Greenleaf was named consul at the United States embassy in Amsterdam. He served only about six weeks, returning to the U.S. on April 29, 1793. In October 1794, Greenleaf moved out of Webster's home in New York City after hosting a raucous party in the Webster home in October, leading Webster to demand that he move.

=== Land deal with Law ===
Greenleaf returned to Washington, D.C., in December 1794, where he became acquainted with Thomas Law, a wealthy British merchant who had just arrived in America. Law was son of Edmund Law, the Bishop of Carlisle. Law's brother John Law was Bishop of Clonfert and Kilmacduagh and Bishop of Killala and Achonry, and in 1795 was named Bishop of Elphin. His brother Edward Law served as Lord Chief Justice of England and Wales from 1802 to 1818. Another brother, George Henry Law, became Bishop of Chester in 1812 and Bishop of Bath and Wells in 1824. Thomas Law spent years working for the East India Company in India, where he made a fortune in trade.

Law arrived in Washington, D.C., in the summer of 1794, and he met Greenleaf in November or December of that year. Law was deeply impressed with Greenleaf, On December 4, 1794, and Greenleaf sold 500 city lots to Law for £50,000 (or $133,000). The price per lot was $297.60, a 372 percent increase over the $80 per lot which Greenleaf, Morris, and Nicholson had paid for them a year earlier.

=== North American Land Company founding ===
Although Greenleaf continued purchasing land by promising that Dutch loans would be forthcoming, the prospect of Dutch money came to an end in January 1795. A coalition of states, the "First Coalition", formed in 1793 to invade Revolutionary France and bring down the French First Republic. One of the largest of the First Coalition armies gathered along the Franco-Belgian border. Initial success by the First Coalition turned to stalemate, and France counterattacked by invading Belgium and the Netherlands in March 1794 in what became known as the Flanders Campaign. A majority of the Dutch people supported the French invasion, believing it would end of the authoritarian Orangist government. As the French approached Amsterdam, a pro-French republican revolution overthrew William V of Orange on January 18, 1795. The Amsterdam banking and investment community was suddenly no longer in a position to back any distant investments.

Just when Greenleaf or his lenders learned of the Dutch revolution is unclear, but the war in Europe already placed Morris and Nicholson in deep financial trouble by 1794. Many European companies and individuals which owed Morris money had declared bankruptcy, leaving Greenleaf with severe cash flow challenges.

On February 20, 1795, Greenleaf, Morris, and Nicholson formed the North American Land Company (NALC) to finance their land speculation business. According to one historian of American land speculation, the NALC was the "largest land trust ever known in America". The three partners turned over to the company land throughout the U.S. totaling more than 6,000,000 acres (24,000 km^{2}), most of it valued at about 50 cents an acre. In addition to land in Washington, D.C., there were 2,314,796 acres (9,367.65 km^{2}) in Georgia, 431,043 acres (1,744.37 km^{2}) in Kentucky, 717,249 acres (2,902.60 km^{2}) in North Carolina, 647,076 acres (2,618.62 km^{2}) in Pennsylvania, 957,238 acres (3,873.80 km^{2}) in South Carolina, and 932,621 acres (3,774.18 km^{2}) in Virginia. NALC was authorized to issue 30,000 shares, each worth $100.

To encourage investors to purchase shares, the three partners guaranteed that a 6% dividend would be paid annually. To ensure that there was enough money to issue the dividend, each partner put 3,000 of their own NALC shares in escrow. Greenleaf, Morris, and Nicholson were entitled to receive a 2.5 percent commission on any land the company sold. Greenleaf was named secretary of the new company.

=== North American Land Company collapse ===
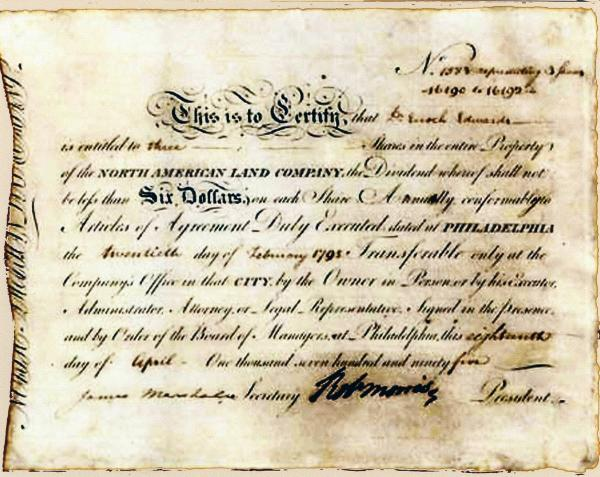
Share certificate issued by the North American Land Company in 1795.

NALC encountered financial difficulty almost immediately. Only 4,479,317 acres (18,127.15 km^{2}) of land was turned over to it, which meant it could issue only 22,365 shares. This meant only 7,455 shares were put in escrow instead of the required 9,000. Rather than paying creditors with cash, NALC paid them with 8,477 shares in 1795 and 1796. On May 15, 1795, Washington, D.C., commissioners demanded their first payment from Greenleaf, Morris, and Nicholson for the 6,000 lots purchased in 1793. But Greenleaf had misappropriated some of the company's income to pay his own debts. Without the Dutch mortgage income and missing funds, there was no money to make the payment to the commissioners. Greenleaf also had co-signed for loans taken out by Morris and Nicholson. When these men defaulted, creditors sought Greenleaf to make good on all the debts, and he could not.

On July 10, 1795, Morris and Nicholson bought out Greenleaf's interest in the December 24, 1793, agreement. The commissioners began legal proceedings to regain title to the 6,000 lots owned by NALC and the 1,115.25 lots owned by Greenleaf personally. The worsening financial problems of Greenleaf, Morris, and Nicholson led to increasingly strained relations among the three men. Nicholson, particularly bitter, began making public accusations against Greenleaf in print. Morris attempted to mediate between the two men, but his efforts failed.

In an attempt to resolve his financial problems, Greenleaf sold his shares in NALC to Nicholson and Morris on May 28, 1796, for $1.5 million. Unfortunately, Morris and Nicholson funded their purchase by giving Greenleaf personal notes and endorsed each other's notes. Morris and Nicholson, both nearly bankrupt, agreed to pay one quarter of the purchase price annually for the next four years. Under the agreement, Greenleaf's shares were not to be transferred to Morris and Nicholson until the fourth annual payment was received.

Although Greenleaf had a net worth of $5 million (about $1.5 billion in inflation-adjusted 2010 dollars) in 1796, he was having trouble raising the cash to meet his obligations. Land sales were not occurring fast enough or at prices high enough to allow him to meet his debt payments. He offered Alexander Hamilton $1 million in July 1796 if Hamilton would lend his name and reputation to Greenleaf's attempt to raise money, but Hamilton refused.

On September 30, 1796, Greenleaf placed 7,455 of his NALC shares in a trust known as the "391 trust" because it was recorded on page 391 of the firm's accounting book. The 391 trust was created to generate income from the 6% dividend to pay a loan given to Greenleaf by Edward Fox. A trustee was assigned to hold on to the shares. The same day, Greenleaf put 2,545 shares into another trust (the "381 trust"), as a guarantee against nonpayment of the dividend by Morris and Nicholson. Morris and Nicholson's made the first payment to Greenleaf for the one-third interest in the NALC by turning over title to several hundred lots in Washington, D.C. On March 8, 1797, Greenleaf executed the 381 trust. When the NALC did not issue its 6% dividend, Greenleaf transferred a third of the shares in the 391 trust to the trustees. The total number of shares transferred to the "381 trust" trustees was now 6,119.

On June 26, 1797, Greenleaf, Morris, Nicholson, and the trustees of the 381 and 391 trusts executed a new agreement creating an aggregate fund. Morris and Nicholson turned over all their Washington, D.C., real estate and all their NALC shares to the fund. The aggregate fund, which now held the vast bulk of NALC's shares, was created to administer NALC for the benefit of the 381 and 391 trusts. The fund was also to pay the debts owed to Washington, D.C., commissioners, Daniel Carroll, and $900,000 in debt incurred by Greenleaf. Greenleaf later purchased 541 NALC shares on the open market and was again elected secretary of the company.

Morris attempted to keep NALC afloat. He sent agents throughout Europe to try to find investors, but found few takers. With poor business practices dragging down NALC, Morris and Nicholson acting as personal guarantors of each other's notes, and many of these notes coming due, neither man was able to pay them. Creditors began selling the notes publicly, often at steeply discounted prices. By 1798, Morris and Nicholson's $10 million in personal notes were trading at one eighth their face value. NALC also discovered that some of titles to the 6,000,000 acres (24,000 km^{2}) of land it owned were not clearly established, which prohibited it from being used as security. In other cases, NALC found it had been swindled, and the rich land it thought it owned turned out to be barren and worthless.

=== Debtor's prison ===
Greenleaf's funds were exhausted and he unable to pay even a single debt by 1797. He was sentenced to serve time in the Philadelphia Debtors' Prison. Although the exact date that he entered debtor's prison in 1797 is not known, he was definitely incarcerated by October 18, 1797. His debt was eventually discharged, and he was released on August 30, 1798, having served less than a year.

Morris and Nicholson were able to avoid debtor's prison for a time. Both men fled to their homes in Philadelphia. At the time, individuals serving notice of a court suit had to deliver the notice personally. So long as both men remained inside their homes, they could not be served, and could avoid being sued. For several years, creditors' agents camped out on Morris and Nicholson's doorsteps and in their gardens. Eventually both men were finally served, and both were sentenced to debtor's prison. Morris entered prison on February 16, 1798, and Nicholson in the summer of 1799. Nicholson died in prison on December 5, 1800. Morris was released on August 26, 1801, but died penniless and broken in 1806.

=== Resolution of the North American Land Company ===
The North American Land Company remained in existence until 1872. Morris and Nicholson honestly believed that, if their cash flow problems were resolved, they could make payments on the property they owned and their shares would be returned to them. But this proved incorrect. On October 23, 1807, all stock in the company was sold at seven cents on the dollar to accountants managing the aggregate fund. By 1856, the company had produced just over $92,000 in income. Morris and Nicholson's heirs sued to recover the stock and gain access to the income; in 1880, each estate was awarded $9,962.49.

From 1797 to 1843, Greenleaf was a party, plaintiff, or defendant in six lawsuits, which proceeded to the U.S. Supreme Court. He successfully defended himself in all six of the cases. In another seven suits regarding the aggregate fund, which also went to the Supreme Court, Greenleaf was either completely or partially successful. Supreme Court cases naming Greenleaf directly include:

- Knox v. Greenleaf, 4 U.S. 360 (1802)
- O'Neale v. Thornton, 10 U.S. 53 (1810)
- Fletcher v. Peck, 10 U.S. 87 (1810)
- Pratt and Others v. Carroll, 12 U.S. 471 (1814)
- Pratt v. Law & Campbell, 13 U.S. 456 (1815)
- Greenleaf v. Cook, 15 U.S. 13 (1817)
- Bayley v. Greenleaf, 20 U.S. 46 (1822)
- Greenleaf v. Queen, 26 U.S. 138 (1828)
- Greenleaf's Lessee v. Birth, 30 U.S. 132 (1831)
- Greenleaf v. Birth, 34 U.S. 292 (1835)
- Potomac Steamboat Co. v. Upper Potomac Steamboat Co., 109 U.S. 672 (1884)

Yet another case, Morris v. United States, 174 U.S. 196 (1899), involved a suit against the estate of Robert Morris, and helped resolve a long-running boundary dispute in Washington, D.C. The case discusses Greenleaf, Nicholson, and Morris' involvement in selling lots on Water Street in the city.

=== Return to Washington, D.C. ===
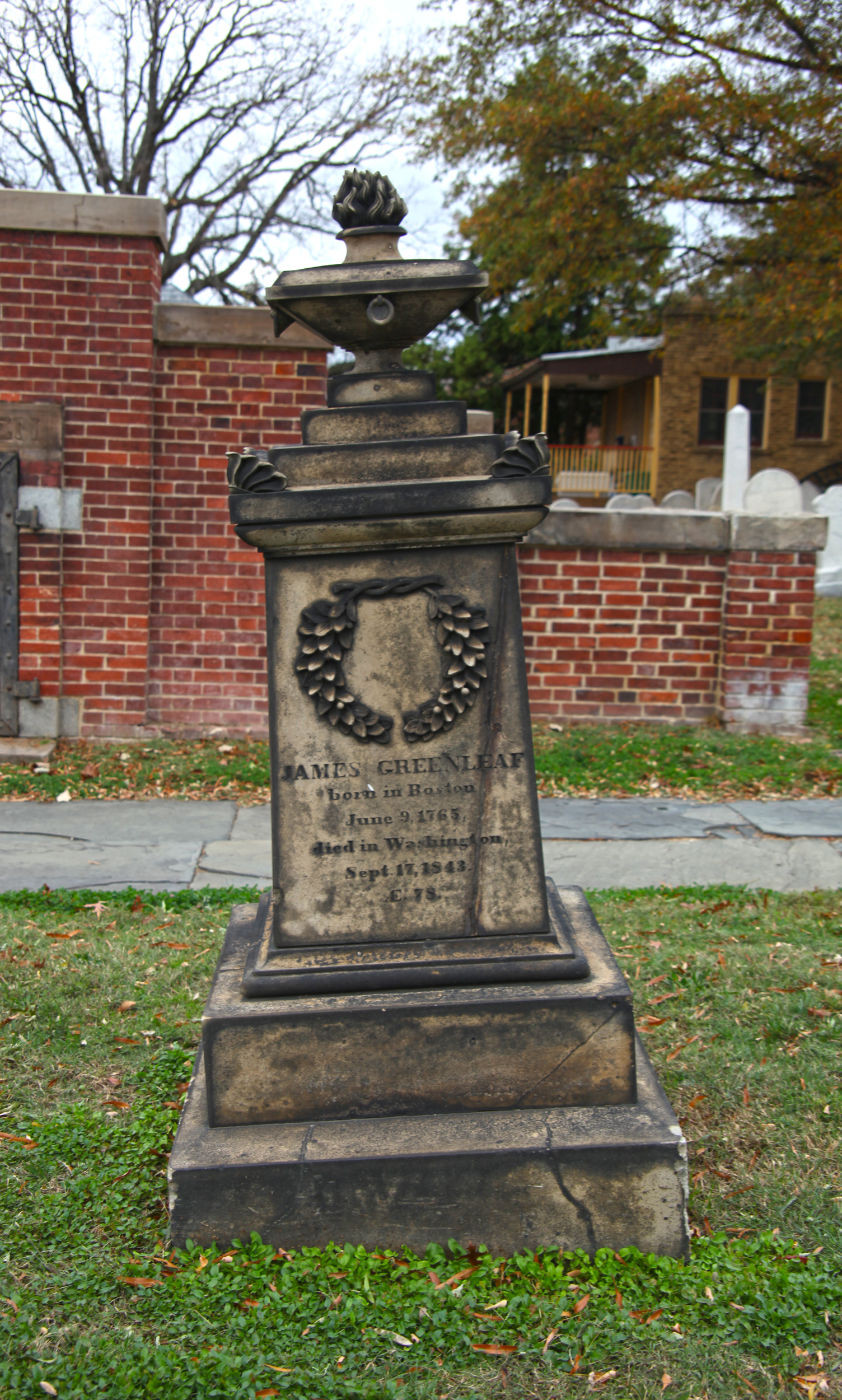
Grave marker of James Greenleaf in Congressional Cemetery in Washington, D.C.

As early as 1816 or 1817, Greenleaf made known to his wife, who was residing in their Allentown, Pennsylvania residence, his desire to return to Washington, D.C., full-time. Ann Greenleaf, however, expressed her unwillingness to leave Allentown. In an 1817 letter to her friend and trustee, William Tilghman, she wrote:

It would be unkind of me to say to Mr. Greenleaf, that I never shall be reconciled to a residence in Washington, D.C., and I believe that he does not suspect that such are my sentiments, but I say to you my dear Sir unhesitatingly, that I dislike Washington...I love retirement, particularly the retirement of Allentown.

Ann did ultimately accompany her husband to Washington, D.C., for short periods. They spent Christmas 1821 in the city, and during the winter of 1826 they rented a home owned by William H. Crawford on 14th Street NW just north of Thomas Circle. They also spent the summer of 1828 in the city, living at Washington House at 222 North Capitol Street. During the first two decades of the new century, Greenleaf repaired many of his personal relationships. By 1830, he had reconciled with most of his family. He spent Christmas 1830 at the Washington, D.C. home of his brother-in-law, William Cranch. During this stay, he also reunited with Noah Webster for the first time in years.

Although he was not estranged from his wife, Greenleaf moved permanently to Washington, D.C., in 1831. For the remainder of his life, he listed his primary residence as Washington, D.C., while Ann continued to live in the couple's mansion in Allentown. In 1831, or shortly before, Greenleaf constructed a two-story wooden house on the corner of 1st and C Streets NE (lots 17 and 18) in Washington, D.C., just around the corner from William Cranch's home. His property included a stable with two horses and some cows. He grew mulberry trees, a widower acted as his housekeeper and cook, and her son-in-law worked as his gardener. Greenleaf also owned a small farm of perhaps an acre or less at 6th Street and Virginia Avenue, SW. The site was later the location of the Jefferson School, designed by local architect Adolf Cluss, and sheltered Major General William Tecumseh Sherman and some of his officers after the Second Battle of Bull Run in 1862. It was razed around 1870.

The final years of Greenleaf's life were spent quietly. His few financial needs were met by his wife and by speaking fees. By the late 1830s, he had paid off or otherwise resolved almost all his debts and had extensive land holdings, though little of it was developed. He associated with childhood friends John Quincy Adams, William Cranch, and Cranch's wife Nancy, who was Greenleaf's sister, and attended the Unitarian Church. He otherwise had few friends and did not socialize much, preferring to spend most of his time sleeping, eating, and reading in the library on the ground floor of his home. He continued, however, to make occasional visits to Allentown to see his wife. In the final few years of his life, Greenleaf's assistant was Bushrod Robinson, later a lieutenant in the Union Army and a local businessman and Washington, D.C., socialite. At the time he knew Greenleaf, Robinson was still in his early 20s. Robinson described Greenleaf as 5 feet 7 inches (1.70 m) tall, about 140 pounds (64 kg), blond haired, clean shaven, courteous, and a great lover of children and books. (Greenleaf owned 2,612 books, which was an extremely large library for the day.)

== Death ==
On September 1, 1843, or thereabouts, Greenleaf fell ill. His health did not decline too much, however, and the illness seemed minor. When Greenleaf's sister, Nancy Cranch, died on September 16, 1843, however, he went into a state of shock on learning of her death. Greenleaf's health deteriorated rapidly over the next few hours, and he died in the early morning hours of September 17, 1843, at age 78. Greenleaf was interred in Congressional Cemetery in Washington, D.C.

Ann Greenleaf continued to live in her Allentown mansion for the next eight years. Blind in the last few years of her life, she died in Allentown on September 21, 1851. She was originally buried in the family vault in the Christ Church cemetery in Allentown. Her remains were later moved to North Laurel Hill Cemetery in Philadelphia.

== Personal life ==
=== First marriage ===
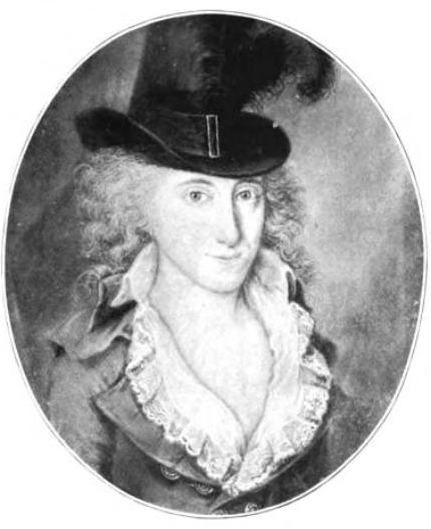
Greenleaf's first wife, Baroness Antonia Scholten van Aschat, c. 1795

In 1788, Greenleaf married Dutch Baroness Antonia Cornelia Elbertine Scholten van Aschat et Oud-Haarlem. She was a member of a powerful Dutch banking family, and noble-born. Greenleaf said that, in 1796, he and the baroness had sex soon after his arrival in Amsterdam. He made it clear that neither had seduced the other. When he returned to the U.S., he learned she was pregnant. He claims he immediately returned to Amsterdam to marry her, and was told that she had miscarried. The van Aschat family convinced him to marry her anyway, and he did so in 1788. Greenleaf said that his wife's maid soon revealed that there had been no pregnancy. By this time, the baroness was pregnant, and she gave birth to a son. Greenleaf says his wife later tried to commit suicide after which he separated from her. During his brief marriage, Greenleaf communicated to Noah Webster how unhappy he was with the baroness. Greenleaf returned to the U.S., and a judge in Rhode Island granted him a divorce on September 3, 1796.

Greenleaf's contemporaries and modern historians dispute his account of his marriage and divorce. Historian Allen Clark, who in the late 19th century interviewed Greenleaf's contemporaries, dismissed the account of deception and said that the couple fell in love and, after a three-month romance, married. But Greenleaf's critics in the 1820s and 1830s said Greenleaf seduced the baroness to gain access to Dutch banking circles and capital for real estate investing. There also is dispute about their divorce. Historians Joseph Smith and Julius Goebel claim the baroness divorced Greenleaf, not the other way around.

James and Antonia had two children before their marriage ended: William Christian James Greenleaf, born September 6, 1790, and Marie Josephine Wilhelmina Matilda Greenleaf (no date of birth known).

Greenleaf's land and financial speculations ruptured his relationships with his family, most of whom he had persuaded to invest in them. It also left impoverished the family of William Cranch, who married Greenleaf's sister, and many Bostonians. But by early 1795, Greenleaf mended his personal relationship with his old business partner, James Watson, and with other business associates in New York City. He also was reconciled with his sister Rebecca.

Having been ejected from Noah Webster's home, Greenleaf moved to Philadelphia possibly because it was considered the halfway point between Washington, D.C., and New York City. On March 9, 1795, Greenleaf purchased the Landsdowne estate of John Penn, the last colonial governor of Pennsylvania, for $37,000. Penn built a luxurious mansion on the estate in or around 1773, and died February 9, 1795. Then, on April 15, 1795, Greenleaf purchased General Philemon Dickinson's house on Chestnut Street, on a corner opposite Robert Morris' home, in Philadelphia for $28,000. Greenleaf held lavish parties at both homes.

Greenleaf did not live long in Philadelphia. His house there was seized by the county sheriff for nonpayment of debts at some point during 1797 and sold at auction for $55,100. Dickinson foreclosed on Greenleaf's other home for nonpayment of the mortgage on November 29, 1797, but Dickinson repurchased it at auction for $15,733.

By late 1797, Greenleaf was on the verge of bankruptcy. But there was no national bankruptcy law. Congress did not pass one until the Bankruptcy Act of 1800, so Greenleaf was forced to apply for bankruptcy in each state where he had conducted business. He first applied for bankruptcy in Pennsylvania on March 10, 1798, although his debts were not settled and his case was not discharged there until March 1804. He then applied for bankruptcy in Maryland on February 9, 1799, and his case was discharged on August 30. In 1802, Greenleaf applied for bankruptcy under the new federal bankruptcy law. His federal case was discharged on March 17, 1804.

=== Second marriage ===
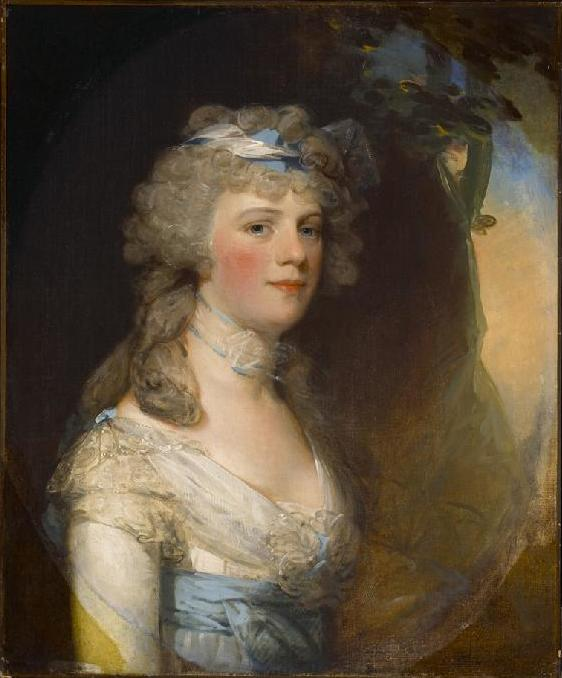
Greenleaf's second wife, Ann Penn Allen (painted by Gilbert Stuart in 1795)

While Greenleaf was in bankruptcy court, he married his second wife, Ann Penn Allen (nicknamed "Nancy"), on April 26, 1800. Allen was known to Greenleaf as early as 1795; Thomas Law mentioned her in a letter about Greenleaf that year. She came from a wealthy and famous family; her father was James Allen, a prominent businessman and political figure in Allentown. Her grandfather was William Allen, former Chief Justice of the Supreme Court of Pennsylvania and founder of Allentown. Her mother was Elizabeth Lawrence, daughter of Tench Francis Sr., a prominent lawyer in colonial Maryland and Pennsylvania, and her uncle was Sir Philip Francis, the Irish-born British politician and political pamphleteer who authored the Letters of Junius.

Ann was also heir to her father's large estate. To protect herself from Greenleaf's creditors, Ann established a trust for all her property before her marriage. William Tilghman, who in 1805 would become Chief Justice of the Supreme Court of Pennsylvania, and John Lawrence were appointed the trustees.

=== Life in Allentown ===
After their marriage, Greenleaf and his wife divided their time between homes in Allentown and Philadelphia. In 1802, Ann gave birth to a daughter, Mary Livingston Greenleaf. Mary married her cousin, the merchant Walter C. Livingston of New York (son of Henry W. Livingston), on July 28, 1828. A second daughter, Margaret Tilghman Greenleaf, was born the following year. Margaret married Charles Augustus Dale of Allentown in July 1832. Mary had eight children, but only one of them married (and this daughter had no children of her own). Margaret's marriage to Dale was a short one. Her parents forbade her to marry, but she eloped. The couple returned to Allentown, where Ann Greenleaf all but imprisoned her daughter in the Greenleaf home and refused Dale entry. Dale forced his way into the Greenleaf home, and James had him arrested. The disgrace of imprisonment proved too much for Dale, who committed suicide after his short imprisonment. Margaret, who was pregnant with Dale's child, gave birth to a son, Allen, in 1833. Allen Dale accidentally drowned in the Delaware and Raritan Canal in 1895. Margaret died in 1898.

The primary Greenleaf home from 1800 to 1807 was a large mansion in Allentown located at the corner of 5th and Hamilton Streets. It was situated in a small park full of trees, and the Greenleafs entertained lavishly and frequently there. A replica by Gilbert Stuart of the Lansdowne Portrait of George Washington hung in the mansion. Although Greenleaf lived comfortably on his wife's income, in 1810 he purchased small amounts of land in and around the city, subdivided it, developed it, and sold it. Because of this development, many of the streets in Allentown bear the names of Greenleaf's relatives and associates: Law, Livingston, Morris, Pratt, Priscilla, Tilghman, and Webster. Greenleaf also helped promoted the construction of a bridge across the Lehigh River.

From 1807 to 1828, Greenleaf listed his primary residence as Philadelphia. Although he continued to reside in Allentown until 1826, Greenleaf spent most of his time in Philadelphia.

Washington, D.C., continued to draw Greenleaf. Greenleaf spent much of the last 40 years of his life defending himself from lawsuits, and he returned to Washington regularly to defend himself in these cases. Greenleaf made his first trip back to Washington on August 17, 1799, and returned repeatedly to the city between 1800 and 1828. He usually stayed two weeks, advertising in the National Intelligencer his arrivals and departures. He usually stayed at either Davis' Hotel on Pennsylvania Avenue NW, Captain Wharton's boarding house on F Street NW, or Miss Heyer's boarding house on New Jersey Avenue SE (near Thomas Law's home).

== Legacy ==
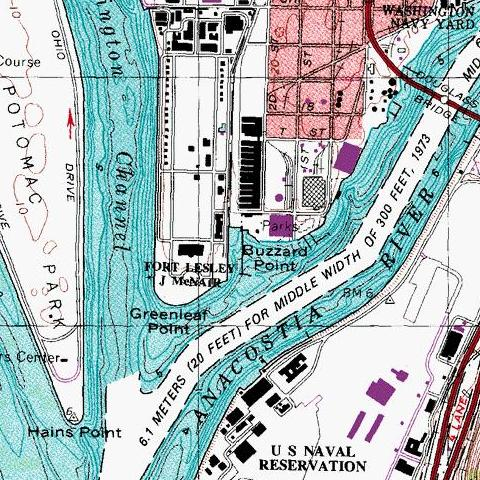
United States Geological Survey map from 2010 showing the location of Greenleaf Point in Washington, D.C.

Greenleaf Point in Washington, D.C., is named for James Greenleaf. Little of Greenleaf Point was developed by the time Greenleaf was forced into bankruptcy. The city grew not on Greenleaf Point, as he anticipated, but around the White House, around the United States Capitol, and between the White House and Georgetown. By 1800, Greenleaf Point was still almost completely undeveloped. The only finished road through the area was New Jersey Avenue, on which two large buildings were constructed. Twenty half-finished structures, begun by Greenleaf, clustered around high land on South Capitol Street. The city's first Methodist church meeting was held in one of the "20 Buildings" in 1802. By 1824, however, the 20 Buildings were in ruins.

Another historic structure erected by Greenleaf was what is now known as the Thomas Law House, built in 1795 on 6th Street SW. Thomas Law and his new wife Elizabeth Parke Custis Law lived there from March through August 1796 after their marriage, and while waiting for their own house to be completed. This structure still stands in 2012, and has been listed on the National Register of Historic Places since 1973. It is one of the few early Federal-style houses still standing.

Greenleaf also at one time owned the land on which the Washington Arsenal and the District of Columbia Penitentiary were later built. This was the site where George Atzerodt, David Herold, Lewis Powell, and Mary Surratt were hanged on July 7, 1865, for their role in assassinating President Abraham Lincoln. Both sites are now part of Fort Lesley J. McNair.

Greenleaf School, a former D.C. public school located on 4th Street SW between M and N Streets SW, was indirectly named for him. In 1871, an existing red brick schoolhouse at that location was renamed the "Greenleaf Building" a name "suggested by [its] location" in the Greenleaf part of Washington. That building was replaced in 1896, but in later school documents, as early as 1909, it was referred to as the "James Greenleaf School". The school was razed in 1960.

Greenleaf also played important roles in American politics and literature. He bankrolled Noah Webster's newspaper, American Minerva. This newspaper played an important role in supporting the Federalist political movement in the 1790s. Greenleaf also provided critical financial support to Noah Webster during Webster's financially distressed early years. Without such support, Webster would have been unable to continue writing or sustain his interest in his dictionary.

Although James Greenleaf is not well-remembered two centuries after he was most active in business, historians Thomas P. Abernethy and Wendell H. Stephenson nevertheless call Greenleaf "the most important land speculator that the United States has produced."

== Bibliography ==
- Aaseng, Nathan. Business Builders in Real Estate. Minneapolis: Oliver Press, 2002.
- Abbot, William Wright; Chase, Philander D.; Hoth, David R.; Patrick, Christian Sternberg; and Twohig, Dorothy, eds. The Papers of George Washington, Presidential Series: January 1-April 30, 1794. Charlottesville, Va.: University Press of Virginia, 2009.
- Abernethy, Thomas P. and Stephenson, Wendell Holmes. The South in the New Nation: 1789-1819. Baton Rouge, La.: Louisiana State University Press, 1976.
- Arnebeck, Bob. Through a Fiery Trial: Building Washington, 1790-1800. Lanham, Md.: Madison Books, 1991.
- Arnebeck, Bob. "Tracking the Speculators: Greenleaf and Nicholson in the Federal City." Washington History. 3:1 (Spring/Summer 1991), 112–125.
- Barlow, Jane A. Big Moose Lake in the Adirondacks: The Story of the Lake, the Land, and the People. Syracuse, N.Y.: Syracuse University Press, 2004.
- Berg, Scott W. Grand Avenues: The Story of Pierre Charles L'Enfant, the French Visionary Who Designed Washington, D.C. New York: Vintage Books, 2007.
- Bowling, Kenneth R. Creating the Federal City, 1774-1800: Potomac Fever. Washington, D.C.: American Institute of Architects Press, 1989.
- Brown, Gordon S. and Thornton, William. Incidental Architect: William Thornton and the Cultural Life of Early Washington, D.C., 1794-1828. Athens, Ga.: Ohio University Press, 2009.
- Bryan, Wilhelmus B. A History of the National Capital: From Its Foundation Through the Period of the Adoption of the Organic Act. Vol. 1. New York: Macmillan, 1914.
- Chernow, Barbara Ann. Robert Morris: Land Speculator, 1790-1801. New York: Arno Press, 1978.
- Clark, Allen. Greenleaf and Law in the Federal City. Washington, D.C.: Press of W.F. Roberts, 1901.
- Clark, Allen C. "James Greenleaf." Records of the Columbia Historical Society. 5 (1902), pp. 212–237.
- Clark, Allen C. Thomas Law: A Biographical Sketch. Washington, D.C.: Press of W.F. Roberts, 1900.
- Daniel, Marcus Leonard. Scandal and Civility: Journalism and the Birth of American Democracy. New York: Oxford University Press, 2009.
- Defebaugh, James Elliott. History of the Lumber Industry of America. Chicago: American Lumberman, 1906.
- Desjardins, Simon; Pharoux, Pierre; and Gallucci, John A. Castorland Journal: An Account of the Exploration and Settlement of Northern New York State By French Émigrés in the Years 1793 to 1797. Ithaca, N.Y.: Cornell University Press, 2010.
- Dowd, Mary-Jane M. Records of the Office of Public Buildings and Public Parks of the National Capital: Record Group 42, Inventory No. 16. Washington, D.C.: National Archives and Records Administration, 1992.
- Evelyn, Douglas E.; Dickson, Paul; and Ackerman, S.J. On This Spot: Pinpointing the Past in Washington, D.C. 3d ed. Sterling, Va.: Capital Books, 2008.
- Fixico, Donald Lee. Treaties With American Indians: An Encyclopedia of Rights, Conflicts, and Sovereignty. Santa Barbara, Calif.: ABC-CLIO, 2008.
- Friedenberg, Daniel M. Life, Liberty, and the Pursuit of Land: The Plunder of Early America. Buffalo, N.Y.: Prometheus Books, 1992.
- Greenleaf, James Edward. Genealogy of the Greenleaf Family. Boston: F. Wood, Printer, 1896.
- Higgins, Ruth Loving. Expansion in New York: With Especial Reference to the Eighteenth Century. Columbus, Ohio: Ohio State University, 1931.
- Kendall, Joshua C. The Forgotten Founding Father: Noah Webster's Obsession and the Creation of an American Culture. New York: G.P. Putnam's Sons, 2010.
- Kornwolf, James D. Architecture and Town Planning in Colonial North America. Baltimore, Md.: Johns Hopkins University Press, 2002.
- Landau, Robert I. and Krueger, John E. Corporate Trust Administration and Management. New York: Columbia University Press, 1998.
- Lessoff, Alan and Mauch, Christof. Adolf Cluss, Architect: From Germany to America. Washington, D.C.: Historical Society of Washington, 2005.
- Livermore, Shaw. Early American Land Companies: Their Influence on Corporate Development. Reprint ed. Washington, D.C.: Beard Books, 1999.
- Mann, Bruce H. Republic of Debtors: Bankruptcy in the Age of American Independence. Cambridge, Mass.: Harvard University Press, 2002.
- Markham, Jerry W. A Financial History of the United States. Armonk, N.Y.: M.E. Sharpe, 2002.
- Micklethwait, David. Noah Webster and the American Dictionary. Jefferson, N.C.: McFarland & Company, 2005.
- Morris, Robert. "Land Fever: The Downfall of Robert Morris." The Missouri Review. 15:3 (Summer 1992), 115–161.
- Munger, Donna B. Pennsylvania Land Records: A History and Guide for Research. Wilmington, Del.: Scholarly Resources Inc., 1991.
- Nagel, Paul C. The Adams Women: Abigail and Louisa Adams, Their Sisters and Daughters. Cambridge, Mass.: Harvard University Press, 1999.
- Nettels, Curtis P. The Emergence of a National Economy, 1775-1815. Armonk, N.Y.: M.E. Sharpe, 1962.
- Oberholtzer, Ellis Paxson. Robert Morris: Patriot and Financier. New York: The MacMillan Company, 1903.
- Pinheiro, John C. "George Washington's Leadership Style and Conflict at the Federal City." In White House Studies Compendium. Vol. 5. Robert W. Watson, ed. New York: Nova Science Publishers, 2008.
- Pitch, Anthony. The Burning of Washington: The British Invasion of 1814. Annapolis, Md.: Naval Institute Press, 1998.
- Rappleye, Charles. Robert Morris: Financier of the American Revolution. New York: Simon and Schuster, 2010.
- Roberts, Charles Roads; Stoudt, John Baer; Krick, Thomas H.; and Dietrich, William Joseph. History of Lehigh County, Pennsylvania, and a Genealogical and Biographical Record of Its Families. Allentown, Pa.: Lehigh Valley Publishing Company, 1914.
- Roberts, Rebecca Boggs and Schmidt, Sandra K. Historic Congressional Cemetery. Charleston, S.C.: Arcadia Publishing, 2012.
- Rogow, Arnold A. A Fatal Friendship: Alexander Hamilton and Aaron Burr. New York: Hill and Wang, 1999.
- Royster, Charles. The Fabulous History of the Dismal Swamp Company: A Story of George Washington's Times. New York: Alfred A. Knopf, 2000.
- Sakolski, Aaron M. The Great American Land Bubble: The Amazing Story of Land-Grabbing, Speculations, and Booms From Colonial Days to the Present Time. Reprint ed. New York: Johnson Reprint Corporation, 1966.
- Schama, Simon. Patriots and Liberators: Revolution in the Netherlands 1780-1813. New York: Vintage Books, 1977.
- Schneider, Paul. The Adirondacks: A History of America's First Wilderness. New York: Henry Holt and Co., 1997.
- Smith, Joseph and Goebel, Julius. The Law Practice of Alexander Hamilton: Documents and Commentary. New York: William Nelson Cromwell Foundation, 1964.
- Snyder, Alan K. Defining Noah Webster. Washington, D.C.: Allegiance Press, 2002.
- Syrett, Harold C. and Cooke, Jacob E. Papers of Alexander Hamilton. New York: Columbia University Press, 1976.
- Warren, Jack D. and Brownson, Anna L. The Presidency of George Washington. Mt. Vernon, Va.: Mount Vernon Ladies' Association, 2000.
