= Greenleaf (automobile) =

Defunct American motor vehicle manufacturer

The Greenleaf was an automobile manufactured in Lansing, Michigan by the Greenleaf Cycle Company in 1902. The Greenleaf was a light surrey that was powered by a two-cylinder horizontal engine that developed 10 hp at 700 rpm.
