= Greenleaf Township =

Greenleaf Township may refer to:

- Greenleaf Township, Washington County, Kansas, in Washington County, Kansas
- Greenleaf Township, Michigan
- Greenleaf Township, Meeker County, Minnesota
- Greenleaf Township, Hand County, South Dakota, in Hand County, South Dakota
