= Greenleaf Publishing =

British publishing company

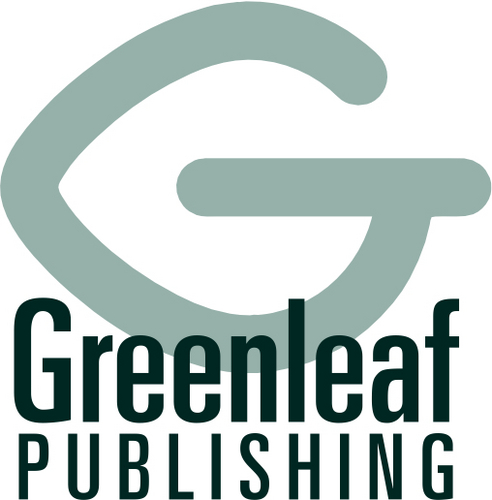
- Parent company: Routledge
- Status: Imprint
- Founded: 1992; 34 years ago
- Country of origin: United Kingdom
- Distribution: Worldwide
- Nonfiction topics: business ethics, environmental policy, business strategy and sustainable development
- Owner: Taylor & Francis
- Official website: www.routledge.com/go/greenleaf-publishing

Greenleaf Publishing is a British publishing imprint specializing academic books that cover corporate responsibility, business ethics, environmental policy and management, future business strategy and practice, and sustainable development.

Greenleaf has a catalogue of over 300 titles and also publishes a range of academic journals and since 2017 has been an imprint of Routledge.

== History ==
The company was founded in 1992 as an independent publisher, the company became part of GSE Research Limited, an online scholarly publisher specializing in governance, sustainability and the environment, in 2012.

In 2017, the company was sold to Taylor & Francis and became part of its Routledge imprint.

The company has collaborated with various international organizations working in the fields of sustainability and social responsibility. These include the Principles for Responsible Management Education (PRME)—an initiative of the United Nations Global Compact—along with the European Foundation for Management Development and others. Greenleaf is also a member of Business in the Community.

Authors published by Greenleaf include Stephen O. Andersen, Mark Moody-Stuart, Stephan Schmidheiny, Paul Shrivastava, and Wayne Visser.

== Publications ==
Greenleaf has an existing catalogue of over 300 titles, including book series on stakeholder management, business education for sustainability, system innovation for sustainability, and responsible investment.

The company also publishes academic journals, including: The Journal of Corporate Citizenship; The Journal of Applied Management and Entrepreneurship; The Journal of Sustainable Mobility; Business, Peace and Sustainable Development; Building Sustainable Legacies; and The Annual Review of Social Partnerships. In addition, Greenleaf offers online collections in the form of the Greenleaf Online Library (GOL) and the Sustainable Organization Library (SOL).
