= O'Neale v. Thornton =

- Supreme Court of the United States
- Full case name: O'Neale v. Thornton
- Citations: 10 U.S. 53 (more) 6 Cranch 53; 3 L. Ed. 150

Case opinion
- Majority: Marshall, joined by unanimous

O'Neale v. Thornton, 10 U.S. (6 Cranch) 53 (1810), is a ruling by the Supreme Court of the United States which held that neither the state of Maryland nor the government of the District of Columbia authorized the resale of foreclosed government land at a price less than the original sale price. In establishing the District of Columbia, the D.C. government had sold land to original investors at $66.50 per lot. The investors failed to pay, so the government foreclosed and resold the land to a second investor at the same price. The second investor failed to pay, so the government foreclosed again and sold the land to a third investor at a price lower than the original sale price. This third sale, the Supreme Court said, was illegal. Title should be returned to the second buyer, although the government was still free to seek foreclosure against that buyer on the basis of nonpayment.

== Background ==
In 1789, the states of Virginia and Maryland agreed to cede land to the United States government for the creation of the seat of the national government. Land belonging to absentee owners, the insane, minors, and women was seized by the state of Maryland and turned over to the federal government. The federal government met with all other titleholders to land within the former Maryland lands, and agreed to pay them £25 per acre for their property. Maryland agreed to quiet all title to anyone holding land for more than five years, and made provision for the federal government to sell, foreclose on, and resell land.

The Residence Act of 1790 gave President George Washington the authority to establish the location for the seat of government of the United States. The act also provided for the appointment of three Commissioners to govern the new "District of Columbia". The commissioners were empowered to receive land from the existing landowners, set aside land for streets and parks and public buildings, and sell the remaining land as private property.

In December 1793, the commissioners sold 6,000 city lots to investors James Greenleaf and Robert Morris for $66.50 per lot. Among these were lots Number 1 and Number 2 in square 107. Greenleaf and Morris defaulted on their payment to the commissioners, who foreclosed on the two lots (as well as others). The commissioners attempted to resell the Greenleaf/Morris lots on May 2, 1797, but were unsuccessful. They tried again on August 28, 1797. At this sale, the commissioners decided that the proceeds from any sale would be credited to the Greenleaf/Morris debt. Any intermediate buyer(s) would not be taken notice of. Once more the commissioners found few buyers. Only one lot received a purchase price which recouped the Greenleaf/Morris sale price (plus interest) as well as covered the auction costs. A third resale occurred on October 18, 1797. This time, the commissioners agreed that no lot would sell for less than the amount due (plus interest and auction costs).

On August 6, 1800, William O'Neale purchased lots 1 and 2 in square 107 from Commissioner William Thornton. There was no down-payment, and no security for the mortgage.

On May 1, 1802, Congress enacted legislation which abolished the tripartite commission and established a single Superintendent for the District of Columbia. Thomas Munroe was appointed superintendent. Since O'Neale had failed to pay his mortgage, Munroe foreclosed and sold lots 1 and 2 to Andrew Ross. The purchase price was less than the amount owed on the Greenleaf/Morris mortgage, however. Ross turned title to the land over to James Moore.

Thornton sued O'Neale in the Circuit Court of the District of Columbia to recover the 1800 sale price. O'Neale raised two defenses: First, that the commissioners annulled the 1800 sale when they foreclosed and took the lots back; and second, that the sale of the lots to Andrew Ross for the amount owed by Greenleaf/Morris proved that the sale to O'Neale was null (preventing Thornton from receiving any proceeds from the Ross sale). He asked the court to instruct the jury accordingly. The court refused. O'Neale was found liable for the payment to Thornton. O'Neale appealed the jury decision on the basis of the failure of the court to issue the instructions he requested.

== Decision ==
Chief Justice John Marshall delivered the opinion of the court.

Thornton had argued before the court that the legislation enacted by the state of Maryland ceding land to the federal government for the creation of the District of Columbia authorized a third sale (the Ross sale) only to pay the second sale (the O'Neale sale). Thus, the proceeds from the Ross sale should go to Thornton. But, Thornton argued, if the Maryland law did not apply, then the third sale was illegal and O'Neale still held title to lots 1 and 2—and Thornton could still sue O'Neale for payment of the mortgage on the land O'Neale continued to hold.

Marshall concluded that the Maryland legislation clearly specified one sale of land. In the event of a default, the land could be seized and resold. O'Neale's purchase, therefore, should be considered null. However, Marshall said, neither the Maryland legislature nor the commissioners agreed to resales at less than the original sale price (e.g., the Greenleaf/Morris sale price). When Munroe sold lots 1 and 2 to Ross for less than the Greenleaf/Morris price, he did so illegally. This made the Ross sale null and void as well.

Marshall then declined to decide whether O'Neale still held title to lots 1 and 2. Thornton had admitted O'Neale now retained title to lots 1 and 2, but the Superintendent (not Thornton) was the proper plaintiff in the case.

The Supreme Court remanded the case back to the district court for a new trial, instructing the lower court to issue the jury instructions requested by O'Neale. The government was not precluded, however, from seeking foreclosure against O'Neale for nonpayment, however.

== Bibliography ==
- Clark, Allen. Greenleaf and Law in the Federal City. Washington, D.C.: Press of W.F. Roberts, 1901.
- Commission to Investigate the Title of the United States to Lands in the District of Columbia. Title of the United States to Lands in the District of Columbia. Document No. 632. United States Congressional Serial Set. Vol. 61. 61st Cong., 2d sess. Washington, D.C.: U.S. Government Printing Office, June 16, 1910.
- Pinheiro, John C. "George Washington's Leadership Style and Conflict at the Federal City." In White House Studies Compendium. Vol. 5. Robert W. Watson, ed. New York: Nova Science Publishers, 2008.
- Royster, Charles. The Fabulous History of the Dismal Swamp Company: A Story of George Washington's Times. New York: Alfred A. Knopf, 2000.
- Tindall, William. Origin and Government of the District of Columbia. Washington, D.C.: U.S. Government Printing Office, 1909.
- Warren, Jack D. and Brownson, Anna L. The Presidency of George Washington. Mt. Vernon, Va.: Mount Vernon Ladies' Association, 2000.
