= Buzzard Point =

Neighborhood of Washington DC, US

- Neighborhood
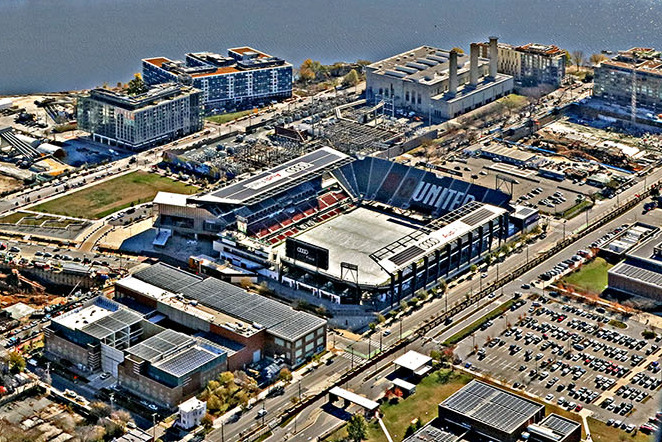
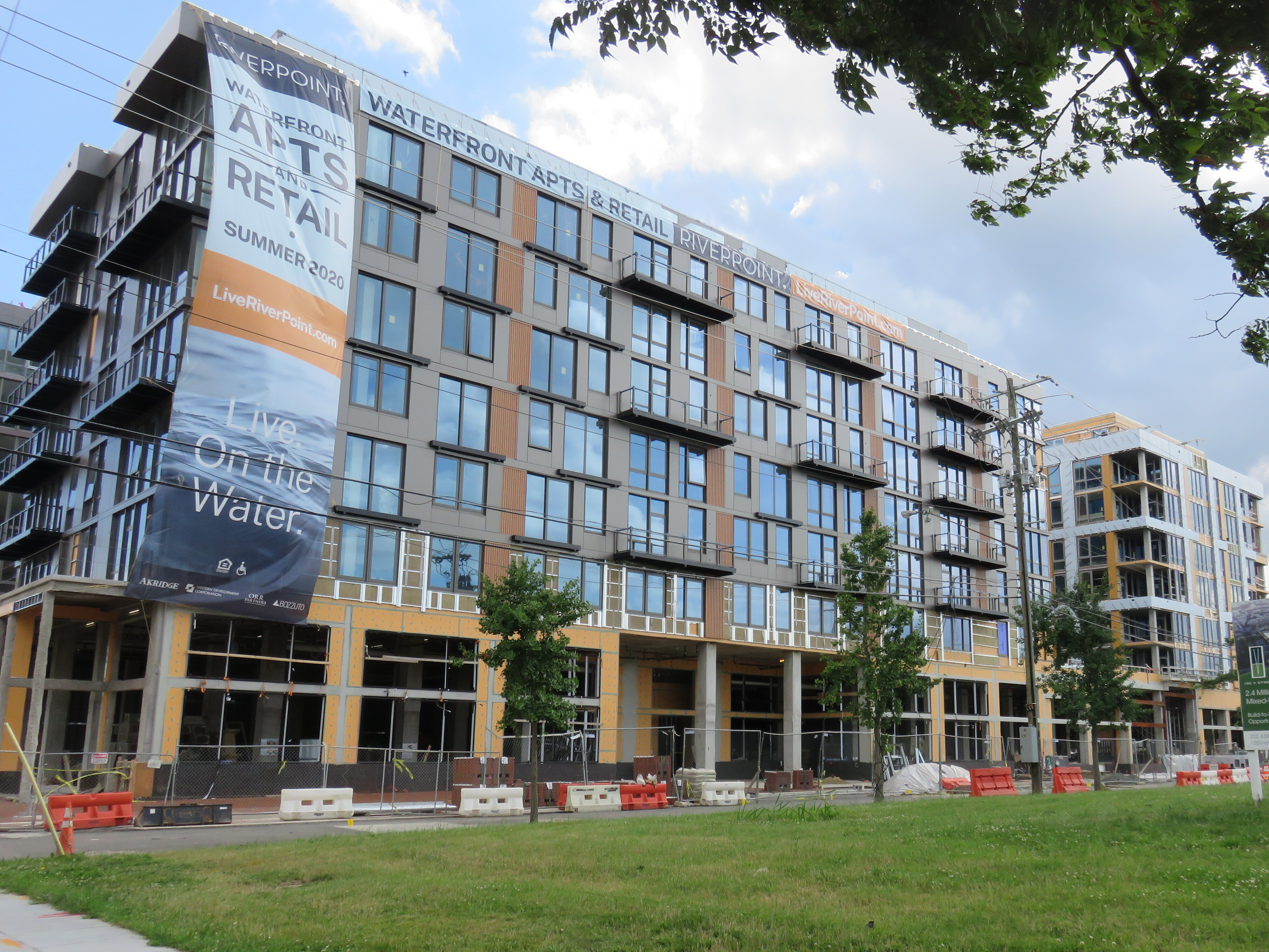
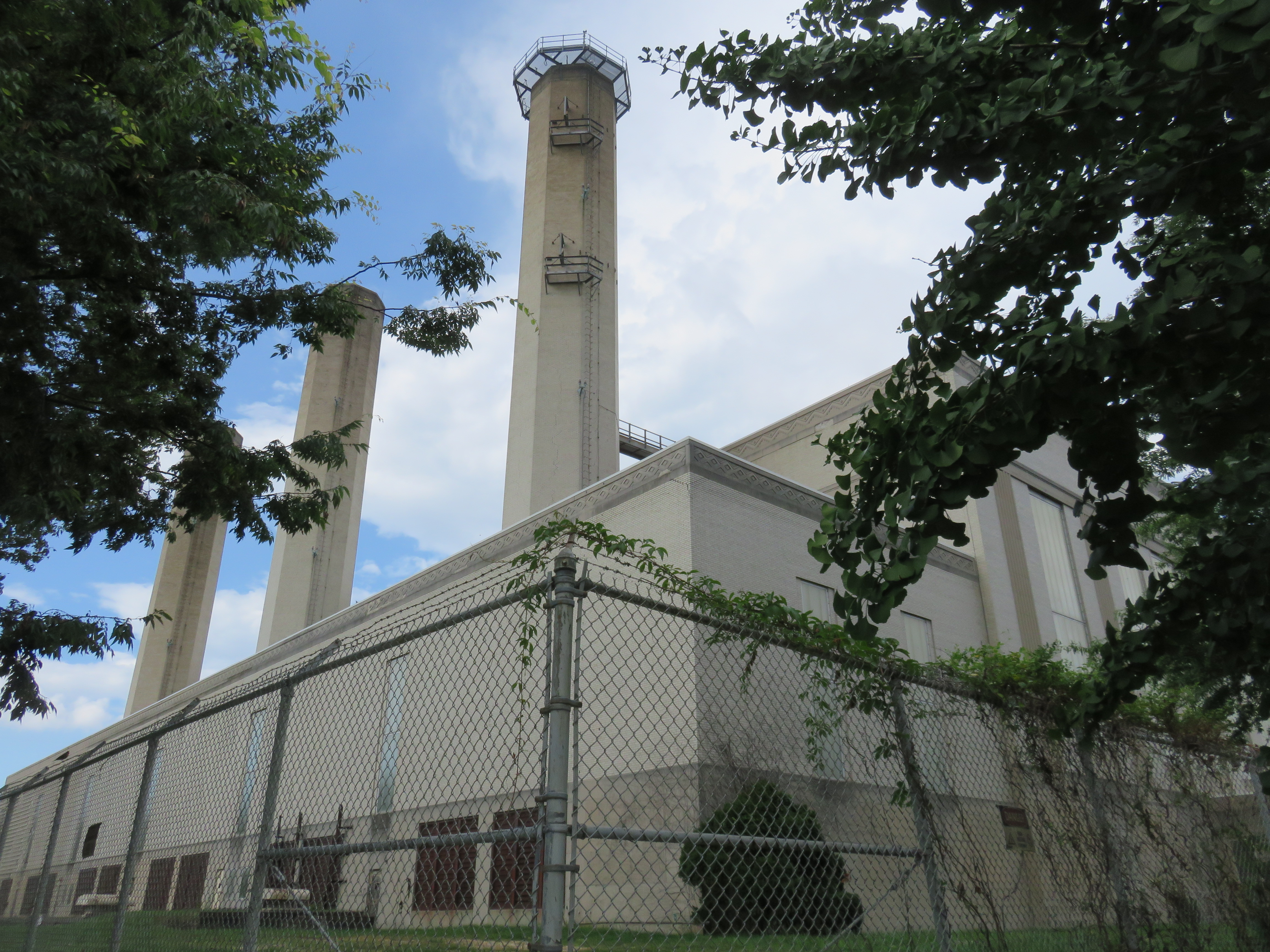
- Top: Aerial view of Audi Field and Buzzard Point; bottom: new apartments (left) and Pepco Buzzard Point Plant (right)

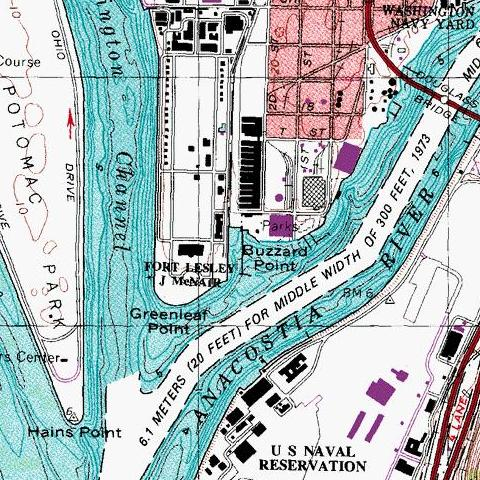
- Coordinates: 38°52′7″N 77°0′41″W
- Country: United States
- District: Washington, D.C.
- Quadrant: Southwest

Buzzard Point, sometimes known as Greenleaf Point, is a peninsula and neighborhood of Washington, D.C., located in Southwest D.C., at the confluence of the Potomac and Anacostia River.

== History ==
=== 17th and 18th centuries ===
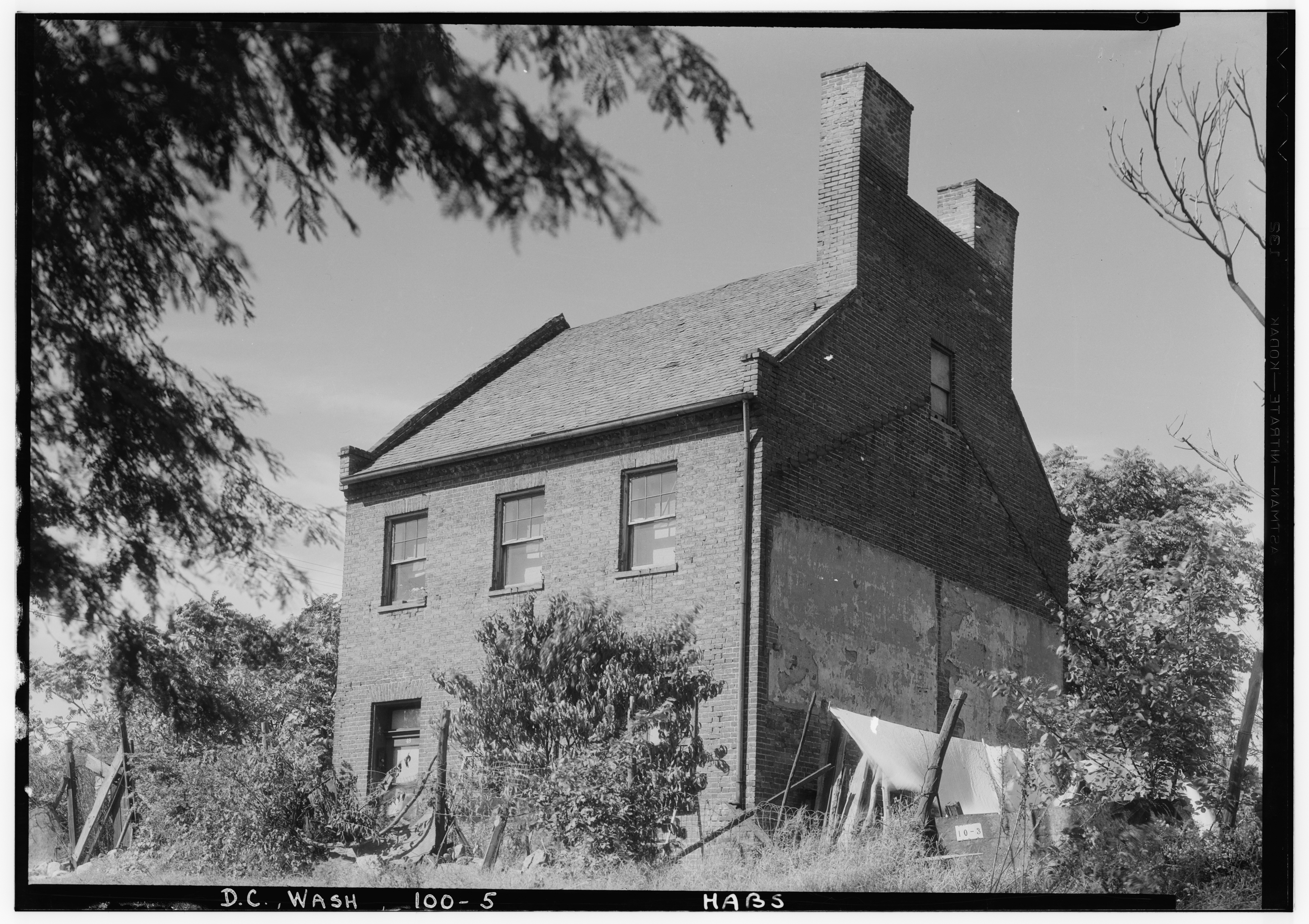
Captain Joseph Johnson House (49 T Street SW) in 1935.

The earliest documented name for the tip of the peninsula that now constitutes the area known as Buzzard Point was Turkey Buzzard Point, in use by 1673 when it appeared on a map published by Augustine Herman, a Bohemian explorer and one of the early European settlers of the Eastern Shore of Maryland. This name — often shortened to Buzzard Point remained in use until the federal capital was planned during the 1790s, at which time it became Young's Point, from one Notley Young, the then owner of the land. Very soon after that, it was renamed Greenleaf's Point, or Greenleaf Point, after James Greenleaf, a land speculator and purchaser of numerous lots in the new city, many of which were located in the vicinity of the Point.

George Washington had intended the military to use some of Greenleaf's lots at the Point, including for defensive works. In 1791, he and Pierre Charles L'Enfant chose the site for the emplacement of a redoubt of some sort. They acquired approximately 28 acres (110,000 m^{2}) by a deed of trust during that year and confirmed it in a July 25, 1798, executive order. L'Enfant intended for a fortification to be placed there, according to his city plan, setting it aside as "Military District No. 5", because, as one author wrote, the "peninsula where the Potomac and Anacostia Rivers met was an obvious, natural military site." This site, sported a "one-gun battery mounted behind earth breastworks," possibly as early as 1791 but, at any rate, definitely by 1794. Within a few years, "The U.S. Arsenal at Greenleaf Point" grew from 28 to more than 89 acres (360,000 m^{2}).

=== 19th century ===
By 1803, the Fort was first referred to as an arsenal and the U.S. Congress provided money to construct additional buildings. During the American Civil War, experiments on new weaponry were performed both at the nearby Washington Navy Yard and the Washington Arsenal as the Army installation had come to be named. Breechloaders, the Spencer carbine, and the Gatling gun were among the weapons tested on the peninsula. In 1908, the peninsula's tip had the name Arsenal Point because of its military use at the time. Washington Arsenal was renamed Fort Lesley J. McNair in 1948.

From its earliest times, the point was primarily ignored by the city's population since it was largely isolated within the city. L’Enfant's and Washington's hopes for bustling river traffic at Buzzard Point wharves never came to be; instead, the area south of Q Street SW and between South Capitol and the Fort retained a predominantly rural aspect. Wrote an early resident of this period: "From the Navy Yard westward along the Eastern Branch [the Anacostia] to Greenleaf's Point was a wild stretch of land with here and there a hovel or a house, and a stouring of brick kilns." The marshy James Creek, flowing alongside the Arsenal (canalized in 1866 as the James Creek Canal but never connected to the existing Washington Canal), served only as a source of disease, often used for trash dumping.

An 1875 survey of Buzzard Point (below Q) found only 36 residences, eight "shanties," and six businesses. These numbers barely increased over the years. Census numbers show the population peaking at 323 in 1894 (this from the Police Census for that year, found in the Metropolitan Police Annual Report) and then decreasing gradually: 231 in 1900; 185 in 1920; 19 in 1940. The area generally had proportions matched almost perfectly of black and white residents, living intermingled and all being of the working class. "Farmer" was the most common profession until about 1920 when "driver" replaced it.

The few accounts of this 1880–1920 period describe a modest community dominated by tidy truck gardens to the south and west and workers' houses and some small businesses along the eastern border from South Capitol to First Streets SW. "It is bordered on either side by true market gardens in the highest state of cultivation. The fields are interspaced with orchards of small fruit trees and occasionally these miniature farms have buildings set back from the road and profusely surrounded with chickens, stables and farm implements", The Washington Post reported on November 21, 1886. The neighborhood was visited seldom by outsiders: "A stranger is a very strange thing on Buzzard Point."

=== 20th century ===
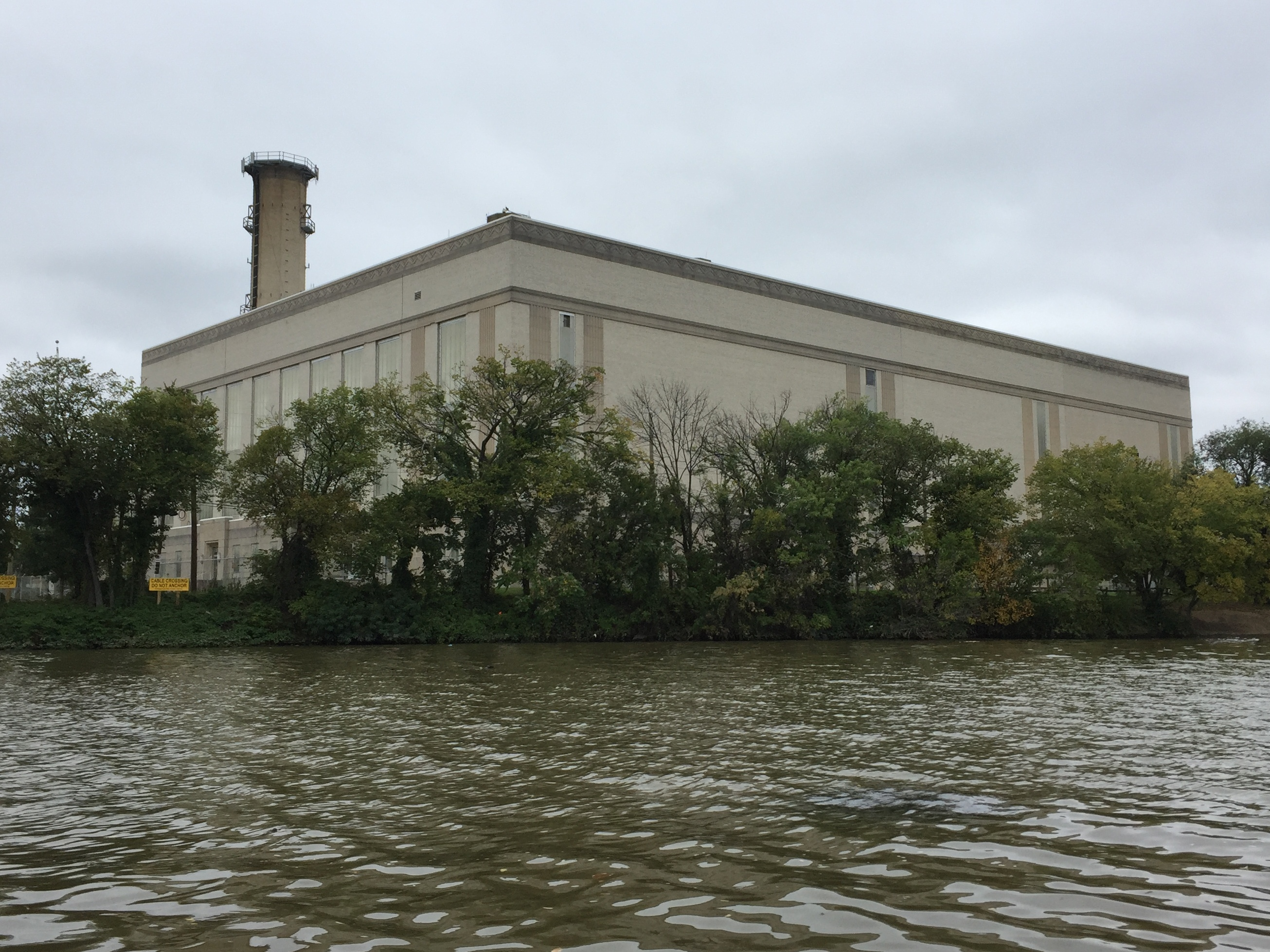
Buzzard Point Pepco Plant, viewed from the Anacostia River

Deterioration was evident by the 1910s as fields were abandoned and the trash-strewn James Creek Canal was progressively filled in. Unpleasant semi-industrial uses crept down South Capitol Street, including trash, which was hauled legally or otherwise to various points along that street and the Anacostia River and also dumped into the river through the city's new sewage system. As the population decreased, city planners tried to plan other uses for this neglected area.

The city's new zoning system of 1920 optimistically implemented industrial zoning in the area of the Point, followed by the 1929 National Capitol Parks and Planning Commission's development planning report intending the area to be covered with railroad spurs and new large-scale manufacturing and utility uses that were unwelcome in other parts of the city. This effort destroyed what little was left of the old rural area without bringing in more than the railroad lines, including Pepco, a power plant and oil and gas storage facility. During the mid and late-20th century, these two major facilities and adjoining smaller ones were closed as new development began from the nearby Navy Yard area. Some boatyards and marinas maintained themselves on National Park Service-owned land along the Anacostia River.

Industry in the area tended to serve the growth of the city, with construction, demolition, and fuel companies dominating the waterfront. Other businesses served the Navy Yard factories. In the early 1960s, the Naval Gun Factory was shuttered and much of the supporting businesses left, concerning planners at the National Capital Planning Commission. The agency initiated several studies throughout the 1960s and 1970s that imagined considerably increased density along South Capitol Street and public parkland along the riverbank. While the plans had little traction, developers, the Washington, D.C. government, and the Federal City Council remained interested in the area. Lazlo Tauber, a developer, built two large buildings for federal offices. The buildings were mired in a scandal that implicated Spiro Agnew, but were eventually leased to the FBI and the U.S. Coast Guard.

The Federal City Council commissioned a study in 1981 promoting the area as a development area with great potential and little resistance. Pepco subsequently began to explore redeveloping its large holdings redevelopment in the 1980s, working with other developers to form a nonprofit called the Buzzard Point Planning Association. They hired the firm Keyes Condon Florance, later Keyes Condon Florance Eichbaum Esocoff King, to create a detailed planning study. The FCC returned to complete a second plan, hiring Wallace Roberts Todd to develop its own plan for the area. Both plans were rejected by the District of Columbia's Office of Planning, who instead initiated the Buzzard Point/Near Southeast Vision 2020 Plan to balance these business interests with the needs of the broader community.

=== 21st century ===
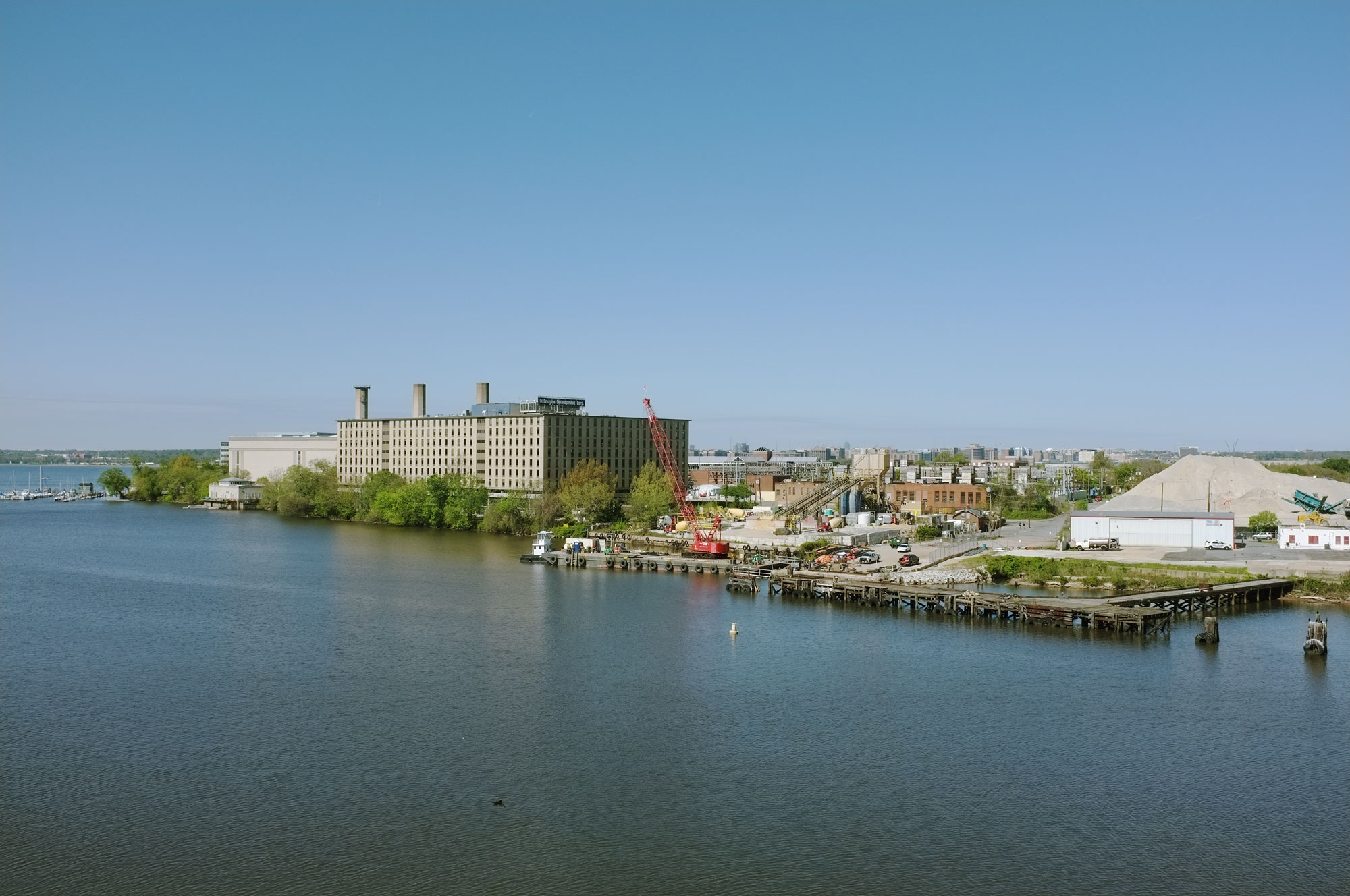
View of Buzzard Point and the Anacostia River

The development plans collapsed during the city's financial crisis. Nevertheless, interest in developing these areas persisted and the plans and policy set the pattern of development for the area that has followed.

The Stacks at Buzzard Point

In 2022, developers announced construction would begin on a two million square foot mixed use project called The Stacks, which is expected to deliver in 2025. The project will include 2,000 residential units and more than 80,000 square feet of retail space. Additionally, there will be hotels, restaurants, and a bowling alley on site.

The United States Geological Survey's (USGS) most recent topographic maps identify the tip of the peninsula that contains Fort McNair as "Greenleaf Point". The USGS maps also identify a lesser point to the northeast of Greenleaf Point as "Buzzard Point". (James Creek, which was excavated during the 19th century to become a branch of the [now defunct] Washington City Canal, once separated these two points. Its name persists in the present-day James Creek Marina, located between the two named points. In early times, James Creek was also known as St. James Creek.)

Although officially the name of only a tip of the peninsula, the term "Buzzard Point" now serves to identify much or all of an urbanized area south of M Street SW and west of South Capitol Street SW, excluding Fort McNair. The area has long been known as an industrial part of the city. Buzzard Point is close to Nationals Park, and not far from the Waterfront and Navy Yard – Ballpark Metro stations. The Buzzard Point waterfront extends from the Fort along the west bank of the Anacostia River as far as South Capitol Street at the Frederick Douglass Memorial Bridge. From west to east along it from the Fort are the James Creek Marina, the former headquarters of the U.S. Coast Guard, Buzzard Point Marina, and Buzzard Point Park.

During 2007, Pepco Holdings announced that it sought to retire the Buzzard Point power plant by 2012.

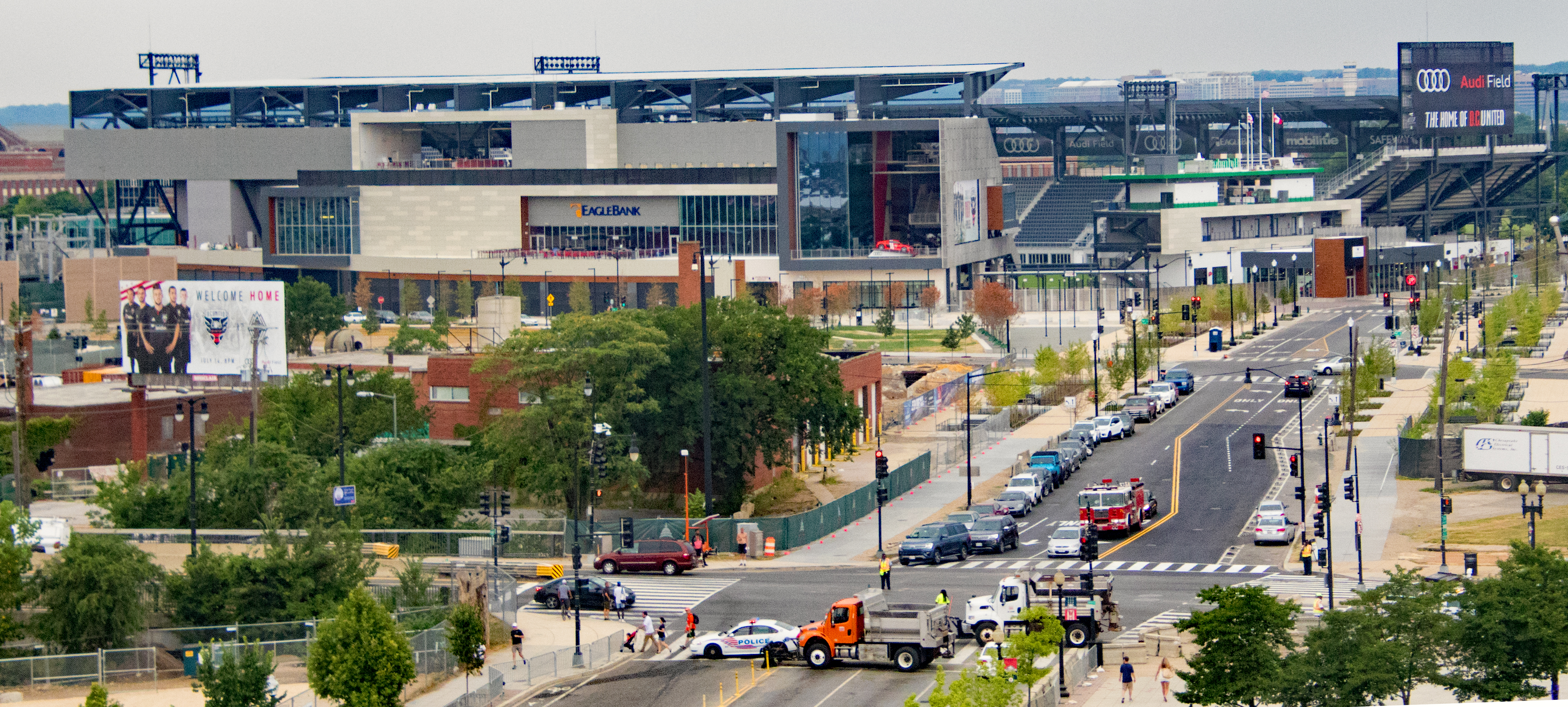
Audi Field

On July 25, 2013, a tentative deal was announced to have a 20,000-seat stadium for the D.C. United soccer team built at Buzzard Point and to cost $300 million. Audi Field opened July 14, 2018.
