= Stephen Greenleaf =

American colonial politician and soldier (1628 –1690)

- Born: 1628; Ipswich, Suffolk, England
- Died: December 1, 1690 (aged 61–62); Cape Breton
- Occupations: Colonial politician and soldier
- Known for: One of the nine original purchasers of Nantucket Island

Stephen Greenleaf (1628 – 1 December 1690) was an American colonial politician and soldier. He was one of the nine original purchasers of Nantucket Island. A number of his descendants became prominent in North American society.

== Life ==
Stephen Greenleaf was born in Ipswich, Suffolk, England to Captain Edmund Greenleaf, an original settler of Newbury, Massachusetts Bay Colony. The Greenleafs migrated on the Mary and John from England in 1634 during the Puritan migration.

In 1651, Greenleaf married Elizabeth Coffin, daughter of Tristram Coffin, in Newbury. In 1659, Greenleaf and Elizabeth's brother Tristram Coffin Jr. put their money together to purchase Nantucket Island; however, neither moved to Nantucket during their lifetimes. Nantucket island was left primarily in the charge of Elizabeth's father.

From 1676 to 1686, Greenleaf served as deputy to the Massachusetts General Court for Newbury. After ten years service in politics, he was appointed captain of the militia. It was in this capacity that he joined Sir William Phips's expedition to take Quebec from the French. However, Greenleaf and his ship were lost at sea near Cape Breton Island on the return of the failed invasion.

== Family connections ==
Greenleaf descendants include poet John Greenleaf Whittier, US Rep. Halbert S. Greenleaf, Judge Simon Greenleaf, James Greenleaf, Rev. William Greenleaf Eliot, Abigail Maria Schoeller, and poet T. S. Eliot.
