= Greenleaf Lake (Meeker County, Minnesota) =

Lake in the state of Minnesota, United States

- Location within Minnesota
- Location: Meeker County, Minnesota
- Coordinates: 45°0′42″N 94°28′13″W
- Type: lake

Greenleaf Lake is a lake in Meeker County, in the U.S. state of Minnesota. It measures 18 feet at its deepest, and is used for both fishing and recreation.

Greenleaf Lake was named for William H. Greenleaf, an early settler.

== See also ==
- List of lakes in Minnesota
