= Bankruptcy Act of 1800 =

Federal legislation in the United States

- Long title: An Act to establish an uniform System of Bankruptcy throughout the United States
- Enacted by: the 6th United States Congress
- Effective: June 1, 1800

Citations
- Statutes at Large: 2 Stat. 19

Codification
- Acts repealed: Repealed by Act of Dec. 19, 1803, ch. 6

Legislative history
- Signed into law by President John Adams on April 4, 1800

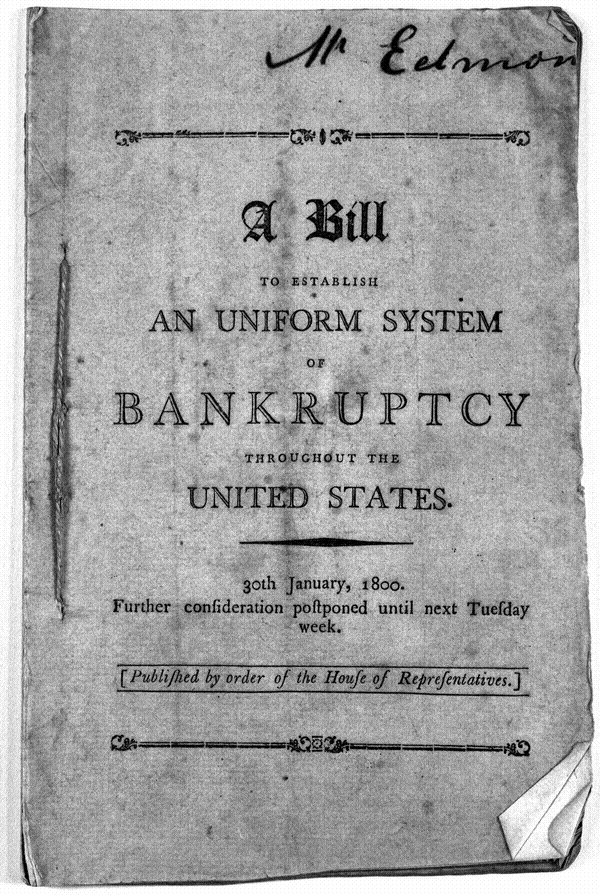
Pamphlet of Bankrupcty act of 1800

The Bankruptcy Act of 1800 was the first piece of federal legislation in the United States surrounding bankruptcy. The act was passed in response to a decade of periodic financial crises and commercial failures. It was modeled after English practice. The act placed the bankrupt estate under the control of a commissioner chosen by the district judge. The debt would be forgiven if two-thirds of creditors (by both number and dollar amount) agreed to forgive the remaining debt. Only merchants could petition a creditor to file a case under the provisions of the act.

Before independence, bankruptcy law in the Thirteen Colonies followed English common law. After multiple wars, including the Seven Years' War and the American Revolutionary War, debt became more common not only at a national level but also in personal affairs. With this change came a shift in perspective surrounding debt. Instead of viewing it as a moral flaw, as English policy did, it became known as bad luck or a result of unfortunate events. By setting up a separate system for debtors and creditors, the United States attempted to curb the number of bankrupt citizens being put in jail. The act was meant as a temporary measure with a five-year sunset clause. Congress repealed the act in 1803.

== English policy in the Thirteen Colonies ==
Prior to independence, policies concerning bankruptcy in the Thirteen Colonies followed English common law. In the late eighteenth century, bankruptcy was seen as a moral failure in England. People were expected to keep their affairs in order and any deviance from upright economic standing was considered a personal fault. Individuals who were unable to pay back their debts had their property confiscated and assigned to the creditor, or were imprisoned.

== United States policy before the act ==
After gaining independence from Britain, the United States faced a substantial increase in debt due to the financial strains caused by both the Seven Years' War and the American Revolutionary War. This mounting national debt had destabilizing effects on the economy, leading to increased indebtedness among private citizens. Despite the prevalence of debt, the nation did not entirely discard English financial practices; however, there were often modifications in the agreements between debtors and creditors.

The national debt crisis culminated in the Panic of 1796–1797. The collapse of the land speculation bubble led to the financial ruin and imprisonment of thousands of debtors. Prominent Revolutionary War financier Robert Morris spent three years in a debtor's prison, while Supreme Court justice James Wilson spent his final years on the court evading creditors. Federalists in Congress, acting on behalf of financial groups, argued for a national bankruptcy law to address the crisis, but were opposed by Anti-Federalist and agricultural interests. The resulting Bankruptcy Act of 1800 passed by a single vote in the House of Representatives.

== Policy changes ==
The legislation allowed creditors to initiate bankruptcy proceedings against individuals unable to settle their debts. Once initiated, these bankruptcy cases were referred to district judges, who appointed independent administrators to oversee the cases and facilitate payments and legal processes. If two-thirds of the creditors, both in terms of number and amount owed, agreed to forgive the remaining debt, the debtor would be relieved of the obligation. This framework aimed to assist individuals in managing their debts and introduced a mediator to prevent creditors from hastily resorting to imprisoning debtors. Only merchants were eligible to seek debt forgiveness through this process.

== Repeal of the act ==
Many of the commissioners appointed to oversee the bankruptcies did not keep track of all the information. When President James Monroe asked for a report on how this act had played out, many reported that they had either not kept their paperwork in order or did not have any to begin with. This allowed for a large amount of dishonesty and fraud. Administrators were able to pocket money or use it for other purposes with very little judicial oversight. Many debtors were not able to be released from their creditors even after their cases had been filed. In addition, many bankrupt individuals hid different assets that they owned to keep them from being taken or used to pay back the money that they owed. Those who were not eligible had no chance to work off the money, and even those who were eligible had to hope that their creditor would file the case and be willing to forgive the debt. In totality, many people were further thrust into debt, and the act did not serve the purpose of lowering economic failure for the nation. As a result, Congress repealed the act in 1803, two years before it expired.

== See also ==
- History of bankruptcy law in the United States
- Bankruptcy in the United States
