= Samuel Galloway III =

Maryland slave trader (1720–1785)

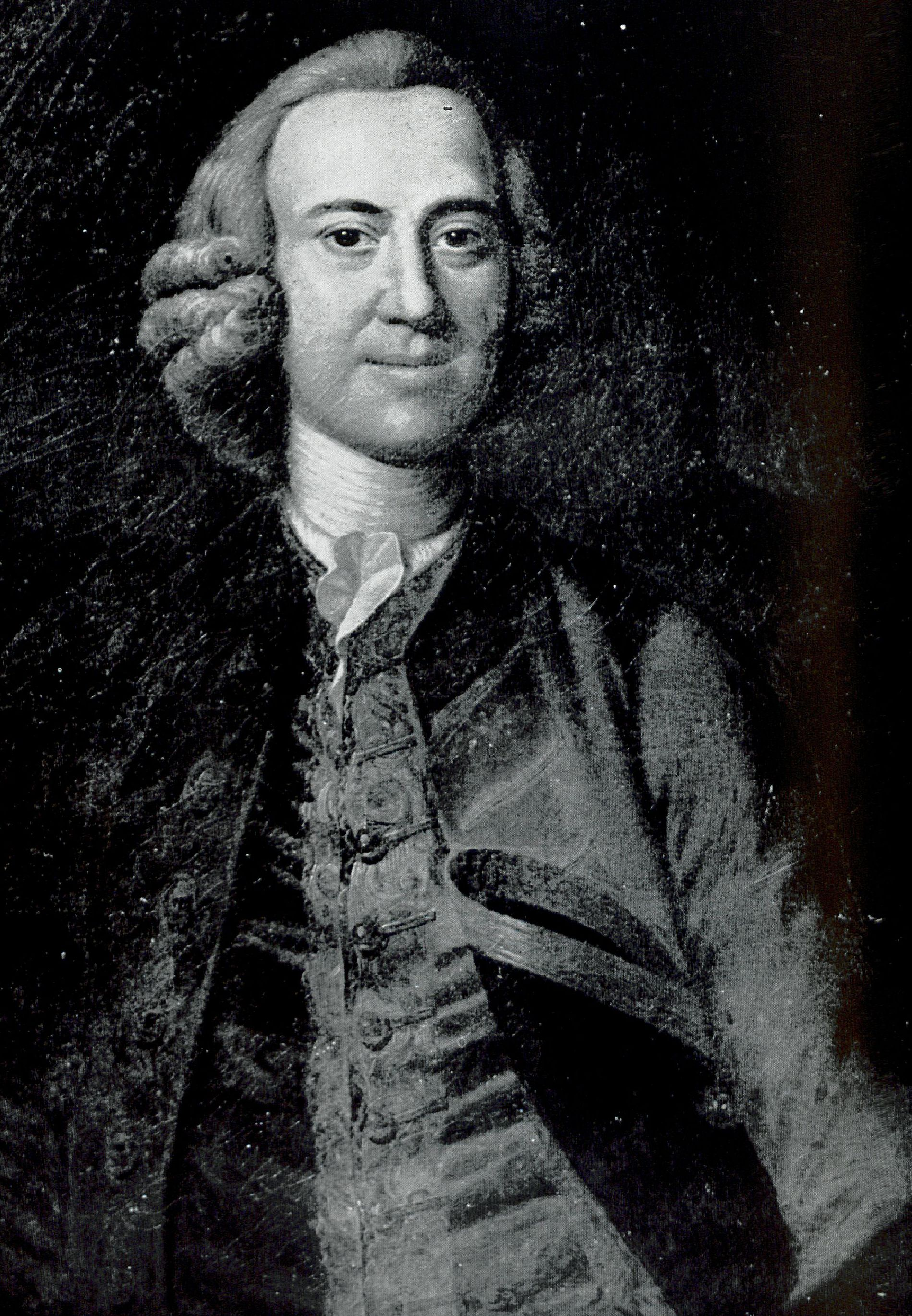
- Portrait by John Wollaston
- Born: May 23, 1720
- Died: 1785 (aged 64–65)
- Occupations: Merchant, slave trader
- Notable work: Tulip Hill
- Children: 5
- Relatives: Tench Ringgold (grandson); Samuel Ringgold (grandson); Joseph Galloway (cousin)

Samuel Galloway III (1720 – 1785) was a planter, merchant and slave trader in colonial Anne Arundel County, Maryland. Alongside his partner Thomas Ringgold, Galloway became one of Maryland's most prolific slave traders, responsible for contracting the ship that brought one of the last shipments of slaves from Angola to Maryland during the trans-Atlantic slave trade. From his plantation Tulip Hill, Galloway was also a prominent member of Maryland's horse racing gentry, where he was an early member of the Maryland Jockey Club and known for owning Selim, one of the foundation sires of Thoroughbred racehorses in the United States.

== Biography ==
Galloway was born on May 23, 1720, in Anne Arundel County, the eldest child of John and Mary Thomas Galloway. The Galloway family arrived in Maryland in the 1640s, and were of Quaker origin. They became prominent merchants and property owners in London Town and West River. Galloway would receive his first properties from his relatives, which he would grow crops supported by slave labor. In 1742 he received an 1,800-acre estate, Hilton, which he would farm as a tobacco plantation until 1761. After the death of his father in 1747, Galloway would inherit several more considerable tracts of land in Anne Arundel County.

In 1742, Samuel Galloway married his first cousin, Anne Chew, daughter of Samuel Chew of Maidstone, despite in the Quaker faith, marriage between first cousins was considered controversial. The couple would have five children: Mary, John, Samuel IV, Benjamin and Anne. Despite being a contemporary of and maintaining a business and warm relationship with George Washington, Galloway was a loyalist. This would put him at odds with his youngest son Benjamin, who was considered a "Republican since his youth".

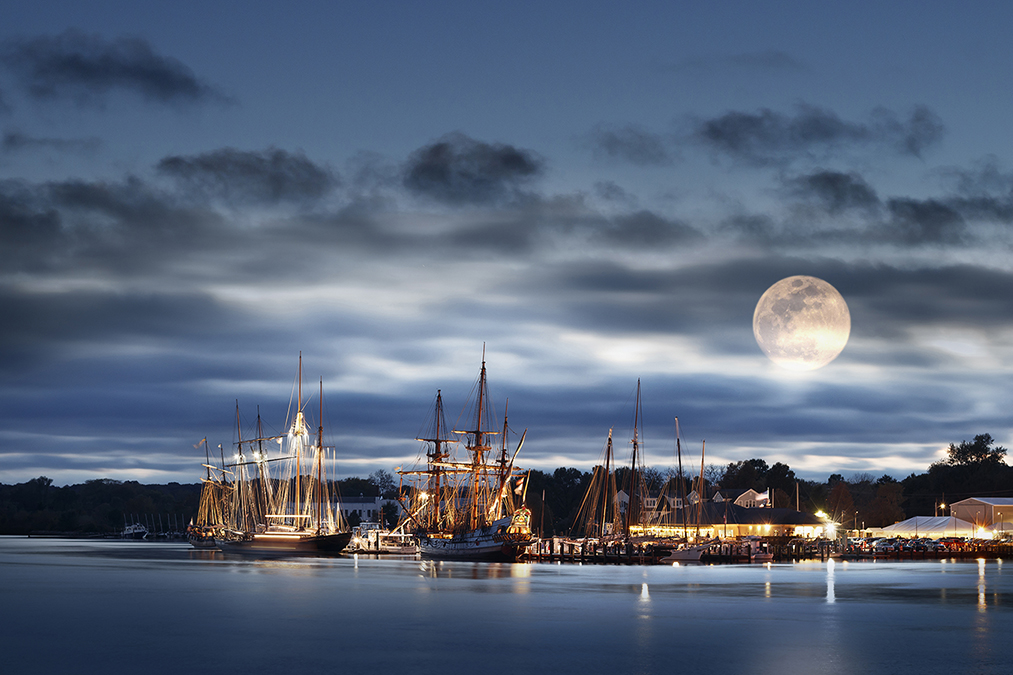
Port of Chestertown, Maryland, one of the locations where Galloway would bring merchandise to the Colonies from abroad.

=== Merchant and slave trader ===
Following in the footsteps of his father and uncles, Galloway established himself in business as a merchant, importing products from Europe to the colonies on his fleet of ships. Galloway began to build his reputation as a trader by importing indentured servants and expelled convicts from England. Galloway's ships would sail from England to Maryland with human cargo, and return to England full of Maryland grown tobacco. By returning the cargo to England on his own fleet, he was said to enjoy a markup on his products of 100–500% on his goods.

In the 1740s, Galloway began importing African-born slaves to Maryland. Alongside his partner Thomas Ringgold, who was based in Chestertown on the Eastern shore, they would become the state's biggest traders in slaves of their time, commanding both sides of the Chesapeake Bay. Galloway and Ringgold would not only import slaves from Africa, but were prominent in trading slaves from elsewhere in the American colonies through their base in Maryland's tidewater. Galloway and Thomas Ringgold's connection was further solidified when Thomas's son Thomas V married Galloway's eldest daughter Mary.

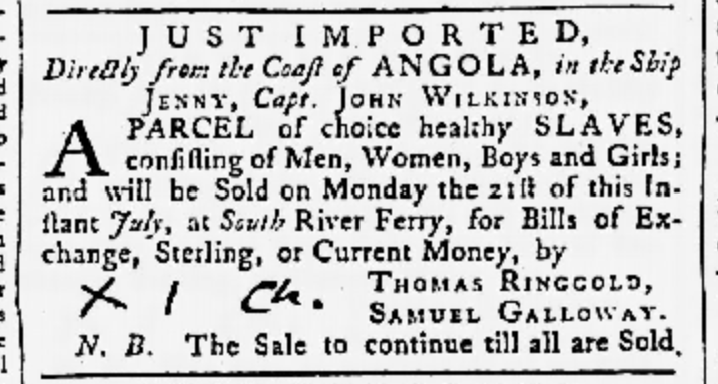
Advertisement for Galloway and Ringgold's slaves on July 15, 1760, appearing in the Maryland Gazette.

In 1760, Galloway and Ringgold were responsible for contracting one of the last slave ships of the trans-Atlantic slave trade between Angola and the Chesapeake bay region. During the journey, the ship Jenny, with her human cargo from Angola was attacked by French privateers. The captain armed fifty of the slaves to fight for their lives, who despite being outnumbered, successfully fought off the pirates. The ship later arrived in Annapolis on July 15, 1760, with a shipment of 333 slaves. Upon arrival in Maryland, the slaves were sold down the Chesapeake Bay, with advertisements for them running in the Maryland Gazette until November, 1760. In the advertisements for their sale, Ringgold and Galloway assured prospective buyers that the slaves were "healthy" and obedient, despite their perilous journey.

Galloway would later involve his youngest daughter Anne's husband, James Cheston in his mercantile business. Cheston, a partner in the Annapolis and Baltimore-based firm Stevenson, Randolph, & Cheston, would become a prominent dealer in indentured servants, slaves and convicts in his own right.

=== Tulip Hill ===
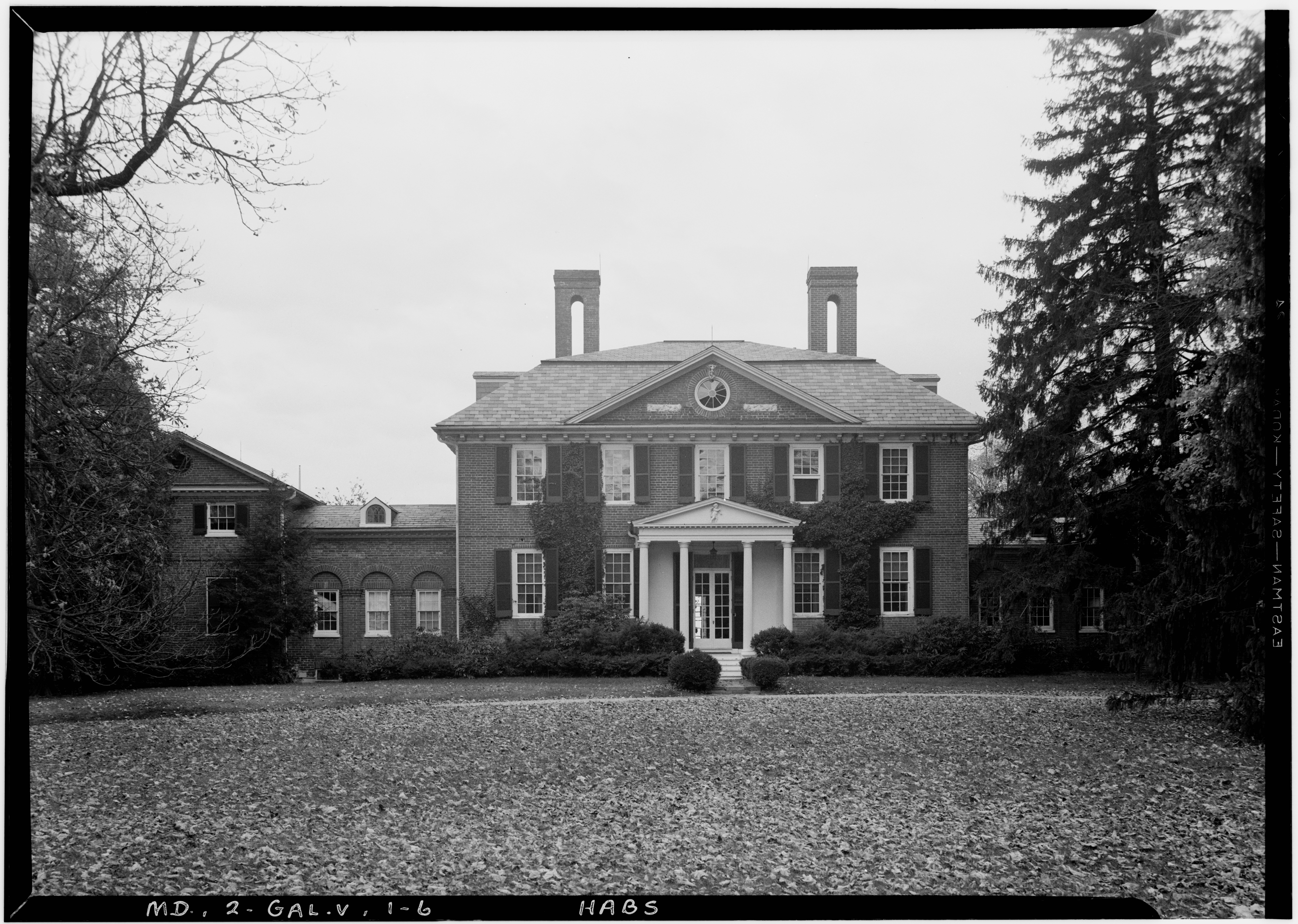
Tulip Hill, pictured 1936

In 1755, Samuel Galloway purchased the 260-acre plantation "Poplar Knowe" from John Talbott. In 1756 he and began construction of a grand plantation house at the site, which he would name Tulip Hill. Named for the stands of tulip poplar trees on the property, the Georgian style manor home was designed and furnished in grand style, with imported Delft tile fireplaces and arched chimneys inspired by Virginia's Stratford Hall. A tulip motif was found prominently throughout the home. In 1771, George Washington visited Galloway's home Tulip Hill. On April 15, 1970, Tulip Hill was named to the National Register of Historic Properties.

=== Horse racing ===
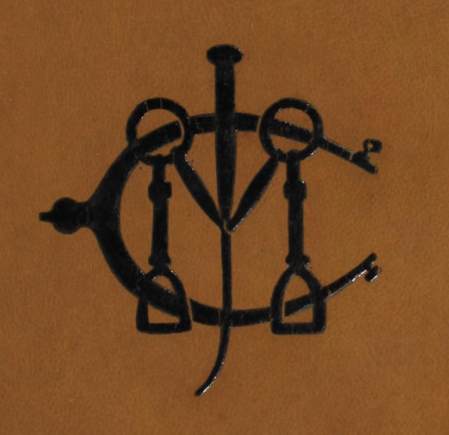
Insignia of the Maryland Jockey Club, founded in 1743

Alongside slave trading, Galloway was involved in horse racing. Horse racing was a considerable past time for the gentry in colonial times, and Maryland and Virginia horse owners enjoyed a competitive rivalry. Galloway was an early member of the Maryland Jockey Club, and owned Selim, who would become a champion racehorse and prominent sire of American thoroughbreds.

Selim was born in Maryland in 1759, the grandson of Alcock's Arabian, and direct descendant of Selima, Benjamin Tasker Jr.'s champion mare. Galloway bought Selim as a yearling on credit from Belair Stud. Selim would go on to a successful racing career, and would begin to stand at stud at Tulip Hill in 1763. In 1766, Selim was the victor in a match-race against a Virginia-bred horse, Yorick, in Chestertown, winning a princely sum of 100 pistoles. At the time, the pair were "the two most famous horses on this continent".

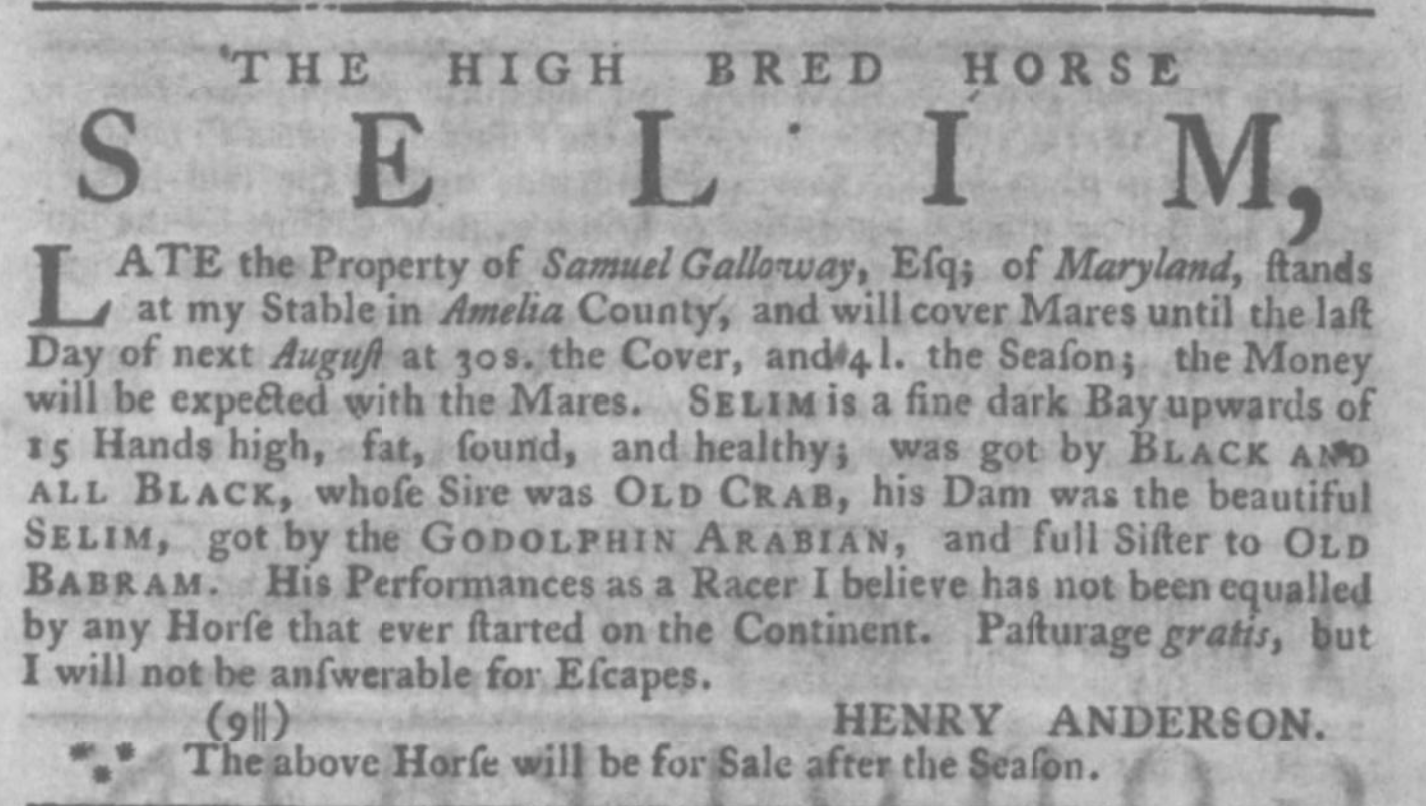
Selim's services advertised in the Virginia Gazette in 1777.

Galloway was said to have used Selim's stud services to strengthen political and business relationships to other prominent leaders of the day. Selim would later be sold to stud in Virginia. Later accounts claim Selim would be buried at Galloway's Tulip Hill estate.

=== Later life and death ===
Galloway completed his last will and testament in October 1785. He would die later that year. At the time of his death, 52% of Galloway's estate was made up of enslaved persons. He owned over thirty horses across three plantations. Galloway's eldest son John would inherit the majority of his property after his death, including his estate Tulip Hill. Galloway's mercantile business, including his trade in indentured servants, convicts and slaves from the West Indies, continued in the hands of his heirs, notably with his son in law, James Cheston.

Galloway and his wife Ann Chew Galloway are interred on their former property, Tulip Hill.
