= Upsala (mansion) =

Historic house in Pennsylvania, United States

- U.S. National Register of Historic Places
- U.S. National Historic Landmark District – Contributing property
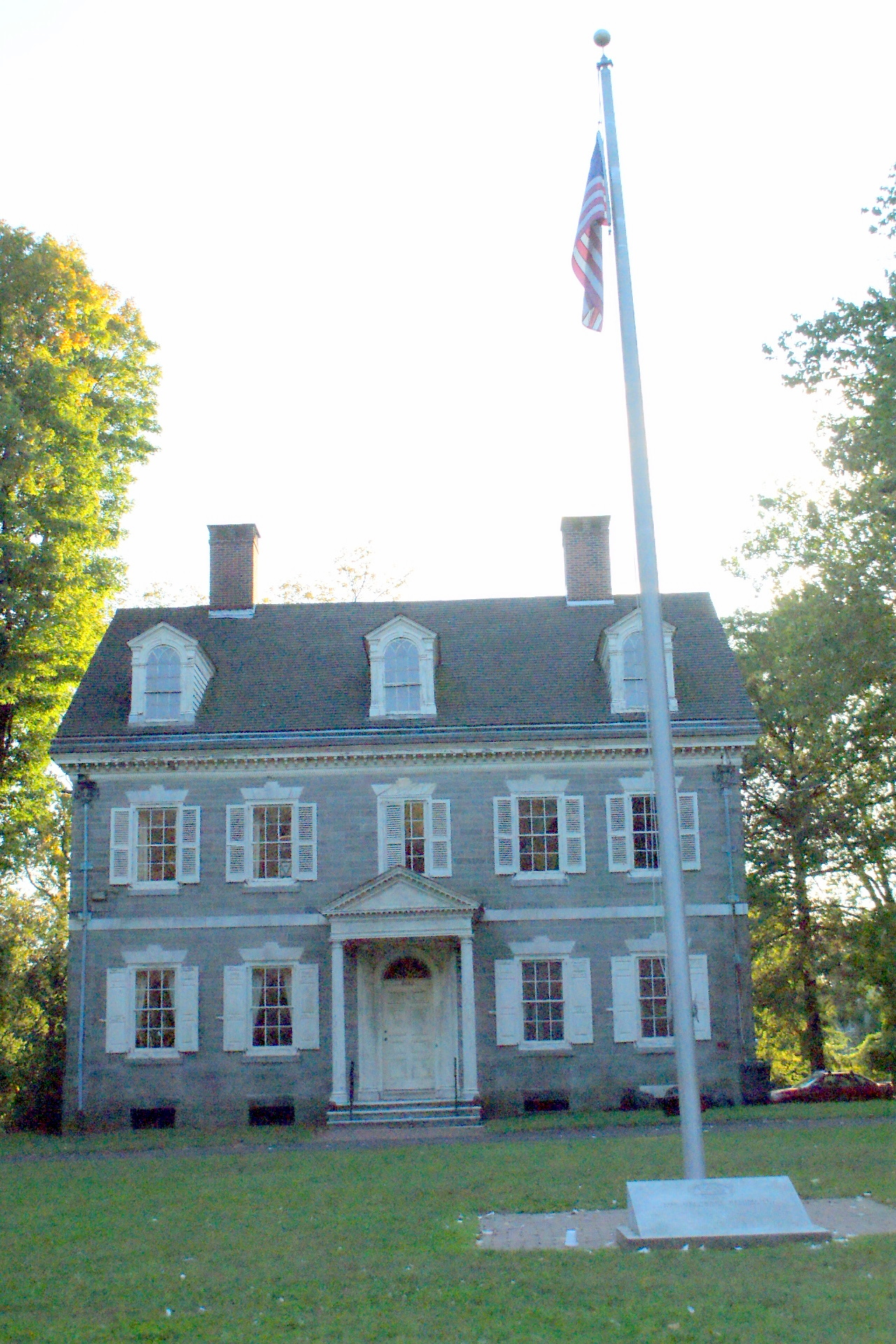
- Upsala, October 2009

- Location within Philadelphia Location within Pennsylvania Location within the United States
- Location: 6430 Germantown Avenue; Germantown; Philadelphia, Pennsylvania; United States
- Coordinates: 40°2′48.15″N 75°8′8.28″W
- Area: < 1-acre (4,000 m^{2})
- Built: 1798-1801
- Architectural style: Federal
- NRHP reference No.: 72001174
- Added to NRHP: January 13, 1972

Upsala is a historic mansion in Mount Airy, Philadelphia, Pennsylvania, United States. Considered one of the finest extant examples of Federal architecture, the mansion is a contributing property of the Colonial Germantown Historic District and is listed on the National Register of Historic Places and the Philadelphia Register of Historic Places.

During the 1777 Battle of Germantown, American troops gathered on the site before attacking British forces across Germantown Avenue at Cliveden, Benjamin Chew's mansion.

== History ==
In 1698, the first owner of the property, Heivert Papen, built a small house on the corner of present-day Johnson Street and Germantown Avenue. The land passed to Dirck (or Dirick) Jansen, one of Germantown's earliest settlers, and was purchased in 1766 by John Johnson, Sr., son of the builder of the nearby John Johnson House. The property was a staging ground of the Continental Army at the Battle of Germantown on October 4, 1777. Continental cannons were placed on the front lawn, and fired at Cliveden (Benjamin Chew House).

John Johnson III inherited the property in 1797 and built Upsala Mansion the next year. Raised as an English-speaking Quaker, Johnson married Sally Wheeler in 1801, and together they had nine children at Upsala. The building may have been named after the Swedish city of Uppsala, though that is unconfirmed. There is additional speculation that one of the Johnson family members was quite taken with, and subsequently named the house after, the Swedish author, Fredrika Bremer. The small house built by Papen was demolished in 1883.

In the 1920s, the annual Revolutionary Germantown Festival began re-enacting the Battle of Germantown, including the attack from Upsala Mansion to Cliveden, on the first Saturday of October. Upsala Mansion was owned and occupied by the Johnson family until 1941. Dr. William Johnson, chief of staff of Germantown Hospital, died deeply in debt. In 1941, the property was seized from his widow, Sarah Trowbridge Bartow Johnson. In September 1942, the property was vandalized, and the roof was heavily damaged by fire. The property was put up for auction and the mansion slated for demolition. There were talks about building a supermarket on the site. In 1944, a group of local preservationists led by Frances Anne Wister acquired the house and established a foundation to restore the property. The building was added to the National Register of Historic Places January 13, 1972.

The house operated as a museum until the early 2000s, when the museum closed due to lack of visitors. The Upsala Foundation merged with Cliveden, which managed the property in cooperation with the National Trust for Historic Preservation. In 2016, they put the property up for sale. The house was sold to two preservation-minded millennials, Alex Aberle and Violette Levy, who are converting the house from a museum back into a single family home. The sale included a clause requiring that the owners allow the Battle of Germantown to be reenacted on the lawn once a year. The National Trust for Historic Preservation began soliciting proposals for adaptive reuse of Upsala in 2025. The next year, the mansion was placed for sale, again with the stipulation that the Battle of Germantown be reenacted on the lawn.

== In popular culture ==
In summer 1999 director Andrew Repasky McElhinney shot interiors and exteriors at Upsala as the primary location for his second feature as a writer/director, the period art-horror film, A Chronicle of Corpses, starring Marj Dusay, Kevin Mitchel Martin, Oliver Wyman, David Semonin, Margot White and Ryan Foley. A Chronicle of Corpses was praised by Dave Kehr of The New York Times as belonging "to the small but significant tradition of outsider art in American movies - films like Herk Harvey's Carnival of Souls or George Romero's Night of the Living Dead - that reflect powerful personalities formed outside any academic or professional tradition.” The original camera negative of A Chronicle of Corpses is in the permanent collection of MoMA - The Museum of Modern Art (New York) along with other movies directed by McElhinney.

== See also ==
- National Register of Historic Places listings in Northwest Philadelphia
