= Tench Ringgold =

American political operative (1777–1844)

- Born: March 3, 1777; Washington County, Maryland
- Died: July 31, 1844 (aged 67)
- Occupation: United States marshal of Washington, D.C.
- Relatives: Thomas Ringgold (grandfather); Samuel Galloway III (grandfather); Samuel Ringgold (brother); Edward Douglass White (grandson)

Tench Ringgold (March 3, 1777 – July 31, 1844) was a businessman and political appointee in Washington, D.C. He was U.S. marshal of the District of Columbia, appointed by President James Monroe (1817—1825) and serving in the position through 1830, during the first two years of the administration of Andrew Jackson. Ringgold also owned a leather factory and curing shop in Georgetown. He was appointed Treasurer of the Georgetown Savings Institution in what was then a separate jurisdiction later annexed by the District of Columbia.

== Biography ==
Tench Ringgold was born in Washington County, Maryland, the son of Mary Galloway (daughter of Samuel Galloway III) and Thomas Ringgold V. The family's youngest son, he was born after the death of his father, a prominent merchant and slave trader based in Maryland's Eastern Shore. The Galloway and Ringgold families were prominent land owners and merchants who had resided in Maryland since the early seventeenth century. Tench enjoyed a comfortable upbringing, growing up on the vast estate, Fountain Rock, outside of Hagerstown, Maryland.

=== Move to Georgetown ===
In 1796 at age twenty, he moved to Georgetown, to establish himself in business. Not long afterwards, he married Mary Christian Lee, daughter of Thomas Sim Lee, who similarly grew up on a vast plantation estate in Washington County. Alongside his business interests in Washington, DC, Ringgold continued to manage his inherited landholdings in Washington County. In 1803, he was managing 1,500 acres and thirty-four enslaved people. Tench Ringgold would continue to own enslaved people throughout his life, trading them between his family members as well as between his city residence and country estates.

Through his Washington connections, Tench developed a close relationship with some of Washington's leading figures, including James Madison and James Monroe. In 1809, prior to Madison's election as President, he wrote to Madison inquiring about a position in his cabinet. He later accompanied Madison when the president and his cabinet were forced to flee Washington, D.C., during the War of 1812. Afterward, he was named as a member of the Presidential Commission in charge of restoring important Washington buildings after the burning, including the Capitol. In 1818, Madison named Ringgold U.S. marshal of the District of Columbia, a position he would serve in until 1830. As Marshal, in 1829 he was asked by Andrew Jackson to accompany him on the inaugural parade to the capitol.

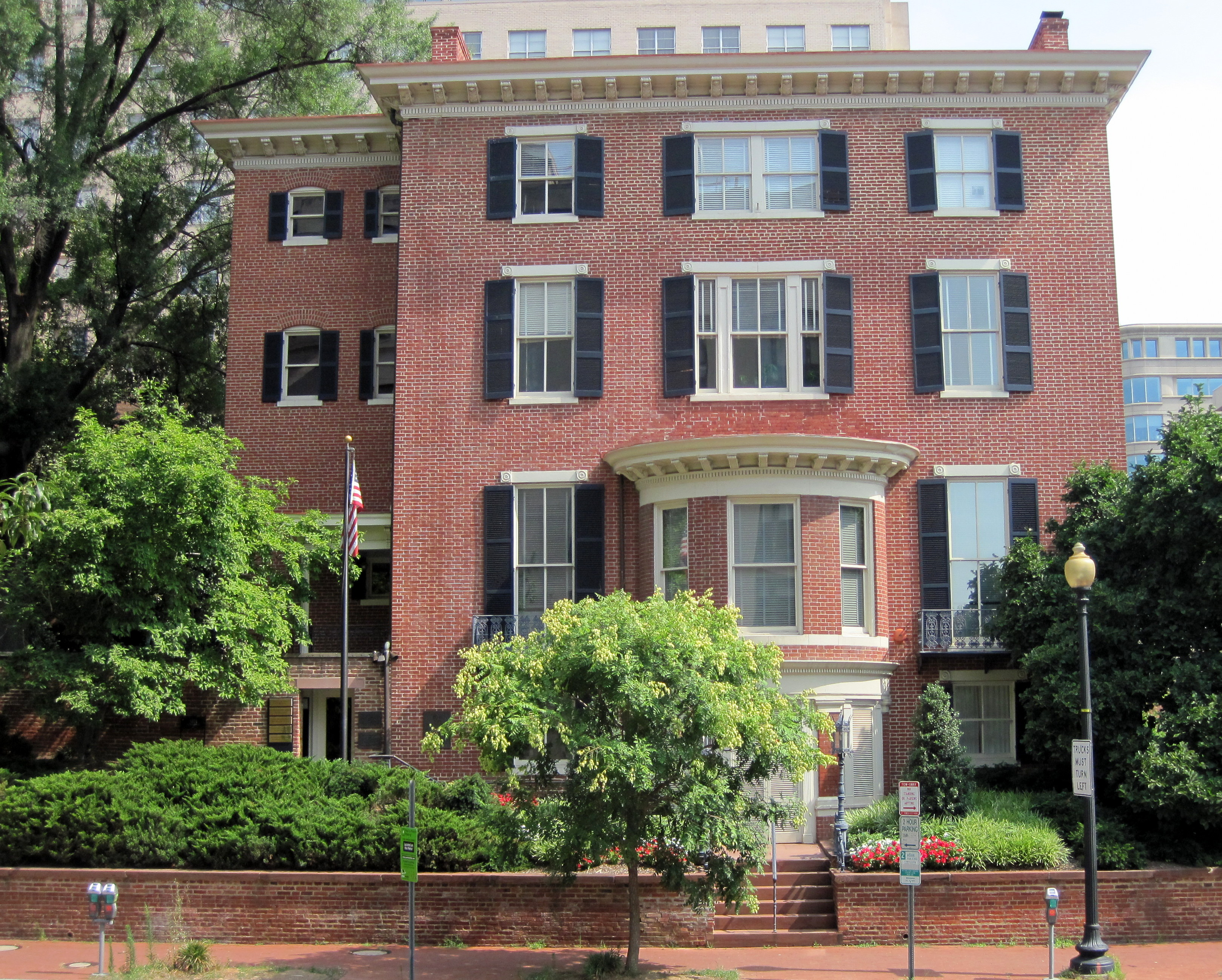
Contemporary picture of the Ringgold-Carroll house.

=== Ringgold-Carroll House ===
In 1825, Ringgold built a grand house in the capital; now known as the Ringgold-Carroll House. Here, Ringgold would entertain Washington luminaries and build political connections. Boarders in the house during Ringgold's residency included Supreme Court Justices John Marshall and Joseph Story, both of whom considered Ringgold a friend. Today, the house has been designated as an historic property and is listed on the National Register of Historic Places.

=== Later life and descendants ===
Through his daughter Catherine, who married Edward Douglass White Sr., Ringgold was the grandfather of Edward Douglass White, who was appointed a Justice of the United States Supreme Court in 1894 and served as Chief Justice from 1910-1921.

Among Ringgold's slaves was Thomas H. Ringgold, a Mulatto who was reportedly fathered by Tench. Thomas was born in Maryland and later became a runaway slave. Thomas married Mary E., who was born a free Black. He then made his way to Springfield, Massachusetts via the "underground railroad," circa 1848. There, he became a successful barber in Chicopee, MA. In response to a newspaper notice, he returned to buy his freedom. Using a lawyer in Alexandria, VA, he secured his freedom and returned to Massachusetts. His wife died shortly after childbirth of their daughter, Henrietta B. S. Ringgold. Henrietta died a few months later, that same year. He re-married and moved, leaving his wife and two children in Springfield Cemetery, Massachusetts.
