= Thomas Ringgold =

American slave trader and revolutionary (1715 – 1772)

Thomas Ringgold IV
- Born: December 5, 1715
- Died: April 1, 1772 (aged 56)
- Burial place: Chester Cemetery, Chestertown, Maryland
- Occupations: Merchant, plantation owner and slave trader
- Known for: American slave trader, Maryland delegate to the Stamp Act Congress
- Relatives: Tench Ringgold (grandson); Samuel Ringgold (grandson); Samuel B. Ringgold (great-grandson); Cadwalader Ringgold (great-grandson)

Thomas Ringgold IV (1715 – 1772) was an American lawyer, slave trader and merchant from Chestertown, Maryland. Along with his business partner Samuel Galloway III, he operated the largest slave trade operation in the Chesapeake Bay and was responsible for importing one of the last shipments of slaves in the transatlantic slave trade to Maryland. Later in life, Ringgold became a revolutionary and served as a Maryland delegate to the Stamp Act Congress.

== Early life ==
Ringgold was born on December 5, 1715, on Kent Island in Kent County, Maryland, where he was a fifth-generation Marylander. He would inherit considerable landholdings from his relatives, and as a young man became a wealthy planter and slave owner. On October 24, 1743, he married Anna Maria Earle Ringgold. The couple would have one child, Thomas Ringgold V.

=== Law and business pursuits ===
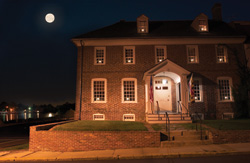
The Chestertown Custom House, home to Thomas Ringgold IV

In the 1720s and 1730s, Ringgold's family moved to Chestertown, which had become Maryland's second largest port after Annapolis. The family began buying property in the city and Ringgold IV trained to become a lawyer. He was admitted to the bar in Queen Anne's County in August 1745 and Kent County by the next year. Alongside his brother William Ringgold, Ringgold diversified his business interests as a merchant, importing goods such as port and molasses, as well as expelled convicts and indentured servants to the colonies. Through trade and property holdings, the Ringgold family would eventually control much of the port and inner city of Chestertown. A diversified entrepreneur, Thomas IV additionally became involved with the African slave trade as a merchant with Liverpool-based James Clements and Company, and as a factor for London merchants Sedgley and Cheston. As his mercantile enterprises developed, he would practice law rarely after 1757. Around this time, Ringgold became Benjamin Franklin's agent on the Eastern shore, helping him collect debts owed from the Pennsylvania Gazette.

== Slave trader ==
In 1746, Ringgold completed works on a grand house for his family and mercantile business in the heart of Chestertown which would become known as the Chestertown Custom House. There, Ringgold would join with business partner, Samuel Galloway III to create one of the largest slave trading enterprises in Maryland history. Ringgold and Galloway were in partnership in the slave trade in Maryland from 1750 to Ringgold's death, where they were responsible for the enslavement and sale of thousands of African people in colonial America.

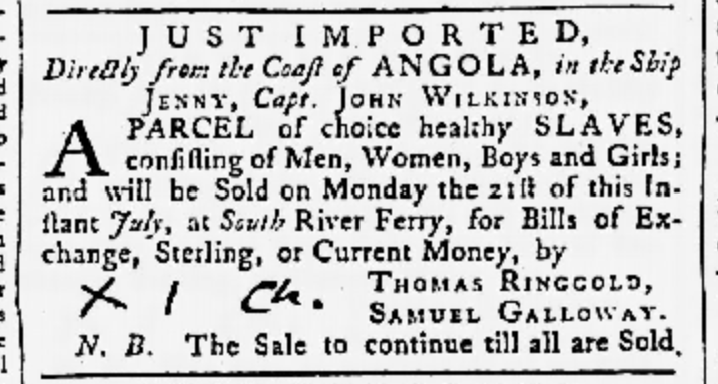
Advertisement from July 15, 1760, by Ringgold and Galloway offering a new shipment of slaves from Angola to purchasers in Maryland.

Ringgold was vocal about his trade, despite considering the slave trade a difficult and dangerous business. He maintained that slaves from The Gambia were "the best", whereas those from Biafra tended to travel poorly. Describing the losses incurred on one of the journeys of his slave ships in 1761, which left the coast of Africa with 320 enslaved persons, Ringgold wrote to an associate,

“we had but 105 left alive to sell, 11 of them so bad we were glad to get 11 pounds per Head for them.”

Ringgold would later involve his son, Thomas Ringgold V in his slave trading enterprise. Ringgold V would marry Mary, the first daughter of his father's business partner, Samuel Galloway III.

== Political and later life ==
=== Revolutionary ===
In addition to his activities as a merchant and plantation owner, Ringgold became involved in politics in his later life. Unusual for a merchant at the time, Ringgold espoused revolutionary politics. Ringgold was a leader in the local Sons of Liberty group and supportive of the American Revolution, a sharp contrast to his business partner and close associate Samuel Galloway. In 1761, he was elected to Maryland's Lower House, representing Kent County, to fill a vacancy. In 1765, he was named a Maryland delegate to the Stamp Act Congress in New York, where he represented himself as a "fine statesman".

In 1770, Ringgold purchased the Hynson–Ringgold House for his son Ringgold V, and where his son and wife would entertain George Washington in 1773.

=== Death and legacy ===
The elder Ringgold died on April 1, 1772, in Kent County, Maryland. At the time of his death, Ringgold IV owned more than 30,000 acres of property in Maryland's Kent, Frederick, Queen Anne's, and Dorchester counties, as well as several plots in Chestertown. The Chestertown Custom House was passed to Ringgold's son, Thomas Ringgold V where he operated his businesses from until his death in 1776. Ringgold IV's son followed in his father's revolutionary footsteps, attending a number of Conventions representing Kent County. Ringgold V died young. With his death, the surviving Ringgold family relocated to Washington County, where grandsons Samuel and Tench Ringgold would later distinguish themselves in military and public service pursuits.

In 1932, original furnishings, wood and plasterwork was removed from the Ringgold house and installed in situ at the Baltimore Museum of Art. The museum also holds portraits of Thomas Ringgold IV and his wife Anna, which were painted by Charles Willson Peale. Today, both the Hynson–Ringgold House and the Chestertown Custom House are owned by Washington College. The first property is home to the university's presidents, and the latter houses the C.V. Starr Center for the Study of the American Experience.

== See also ==
- History of slavery in Maryland
- Seasoning (slavery)
- Tobacco in the American colonies
