= John Johnson House (Philadelphia, Pennsylvania) =

Historic house in Pennsylvania, United States

- U.S. National Register of Historic Places
- U.S. National Historic Landmark
- U.S. National Historic Landmark District – Contributing property
- Pennsylvania state historical marker
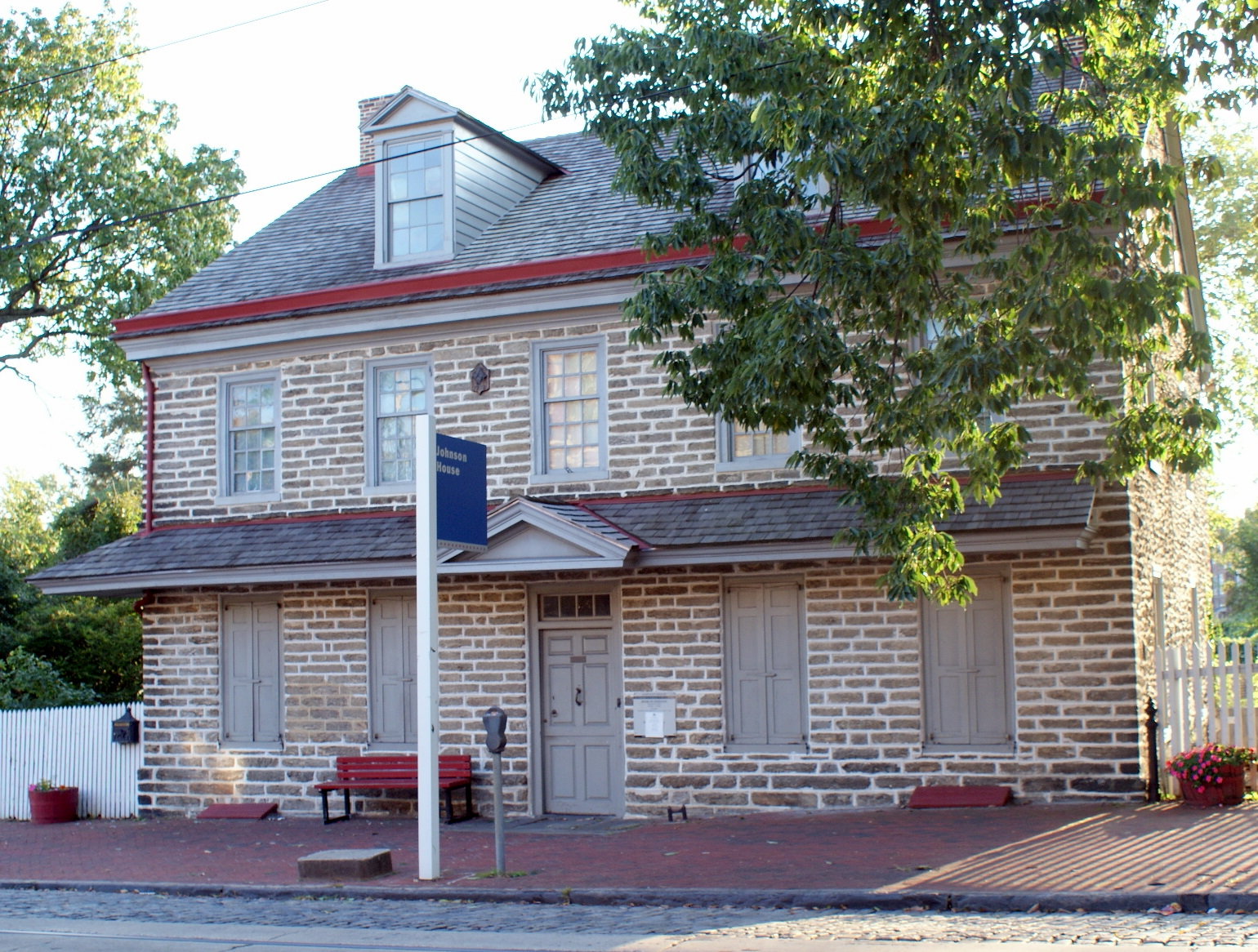
- John Johnson House in 2009
- Location: 6306 Germantown Avenue; Germantown, Philadelphia, Pennsylvania, United States
- Coordinates: 40°2′36″N 75°10′52″W
- Area: < 1-acre (0.40 ha)
- Built: 1768
- Architect: Jacob Norr
- Architectural style: Colonial Georgian
- NRHP reference No.: 72001162

Significant dates
- Added to NRHP: January 13, 1972
- Designated NHL: December 9, 1997
- Designated PHMC: June 1, 1995

The John Johnson House (also known as the Johnson House) is a National Historic Landmark in the Germantown section of Philadelphia, significant for its role in the antislavery movement and the Underground Railroad. It is located at 6306 Germantown Avenue and is a contributing property of the Colonial Germantown Historic District, which is also a National Historic Landmark. It is operated today as a museum open to the public.

== History ==
Philadelphia, especially its Germantown section, was a center of the 19th-century American movement to abolish slavery, and the Johnson House was one of the key sites of that movement. Between 1770 and 1908, the house was the residence of five generations of the Johnson family.

The second and third generations were active in the Underground Railroad during the 1850s. Jennett Rowland Johnson, her children Rowland, Israel, Ellwood, Sarah, and Elizabeth Johnson, and their spouses were members of abolitionist groups such as the American Anti-Slavery Society and the Germantown Freedman's Aid Association. Through their associations with these groups, the brothers and sisters became involved in the Underground Railroad and used their home, along with the nearby homes of relatives, to harbor fugitive slaves on their journeys to freedom. The Johnson House is a representative station on the Underground Railroad, and the Johnsons were among the leading abolitionists of their generation.

The house, then one of the largest in Germantown (then a suburb of Philadelphia), was built between 1765 and 1768 by Jacob Norr for Dirck Jansen, who owned the ground on which nearby Upsala was built. Jansen had it built for his son John Johnson, Sr. During the 1777 Battle of Germantown, fighting occurred nearby and the house still bears marks of musket balls and cannonballs.

== See also ==
- List of Underground Railroad sites
- Cliveden (Benjamin Chew House)
- Germantown White House
- List of National Historic Landmarks in Philadelphia
- National Register of Historic Places listings in Northwest Philadelphia
