= Benjamin Chew =

American lawyer and judge (1722–1810)

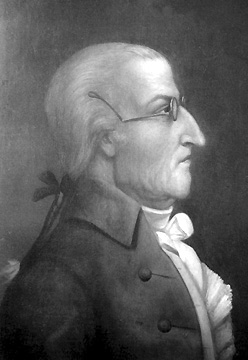
- An illustration of Chew, c. 1890

Judge and President of the Pennsylvania High Court of Errors and Appeals
- In office 1791 – 1808

Chief Justice of the Supreme Court of Pennsylvania
- In office 1774 – 1777

Register-General of Wills of Pennsylvania
- In office 1765 – 1777

Master of Rolls of Pennsylvania
- In office 1755 – 1774

Recorder of Philadelphia
- In office 1755–1774

Attorney General of Pennsylvania
- In office 1754–1769

Speaker of the Lower House for the Delaware counties
- In office 1753–1758

Personal details
- Born: November 19, 1722 Anne Arundel County, Maryland Colony, British America
- Died: January 20, 1810 (aged 87) Cliveden, Germantown, Pennsylvania, U.S.
- Spouse: Elizabeth Oswald
- Children: 11, including Peggy
- Education: Middle Temple
- Occupation: Lawyer, Judge, Chief Justice, High Court President
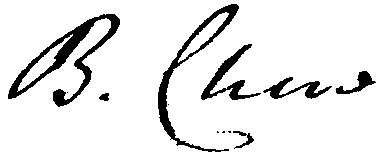
- Signature

Benjamin Chew (November 19, 1722 – January 20, 1810) was an American lawyer and judge who served as the chief justice of the Supreme Court of the Province of Pennsylvania and later the Commonwealth of Pennsylvania. Born into a Quaker family, Chew was known for precision and brevity in his legal arguments and his excellent memory, judgment, and knowledge of statutory law. His primary allegiance was to the supremacy of law and the constitution.

Trained in law at an early age by Andrew Hamilton, Chew inherited his mentor's clients, the descendants of William Penn, including Thomas Penn and his brother Richard Penn Sr., and their sons, Governor John Penn, Richard Penn Jr., and John Penn. The Penn family was the basis of his private practice, and he represented them for six decades. He was also a slave owner.

Chew had a lifelong personal friendship with George Washington, who is said to have treated Chew's children "as if they were his own." Chew lived and practiced law in Center City Philadelphia, four blocks from the Pennsylvania State House, later renamed Independence Hall, and provided pro bono legal counsel on substantive law to America's Founding Fathers during their creation of the United States Constitution and Bill of Rights.

== Early life and education ==
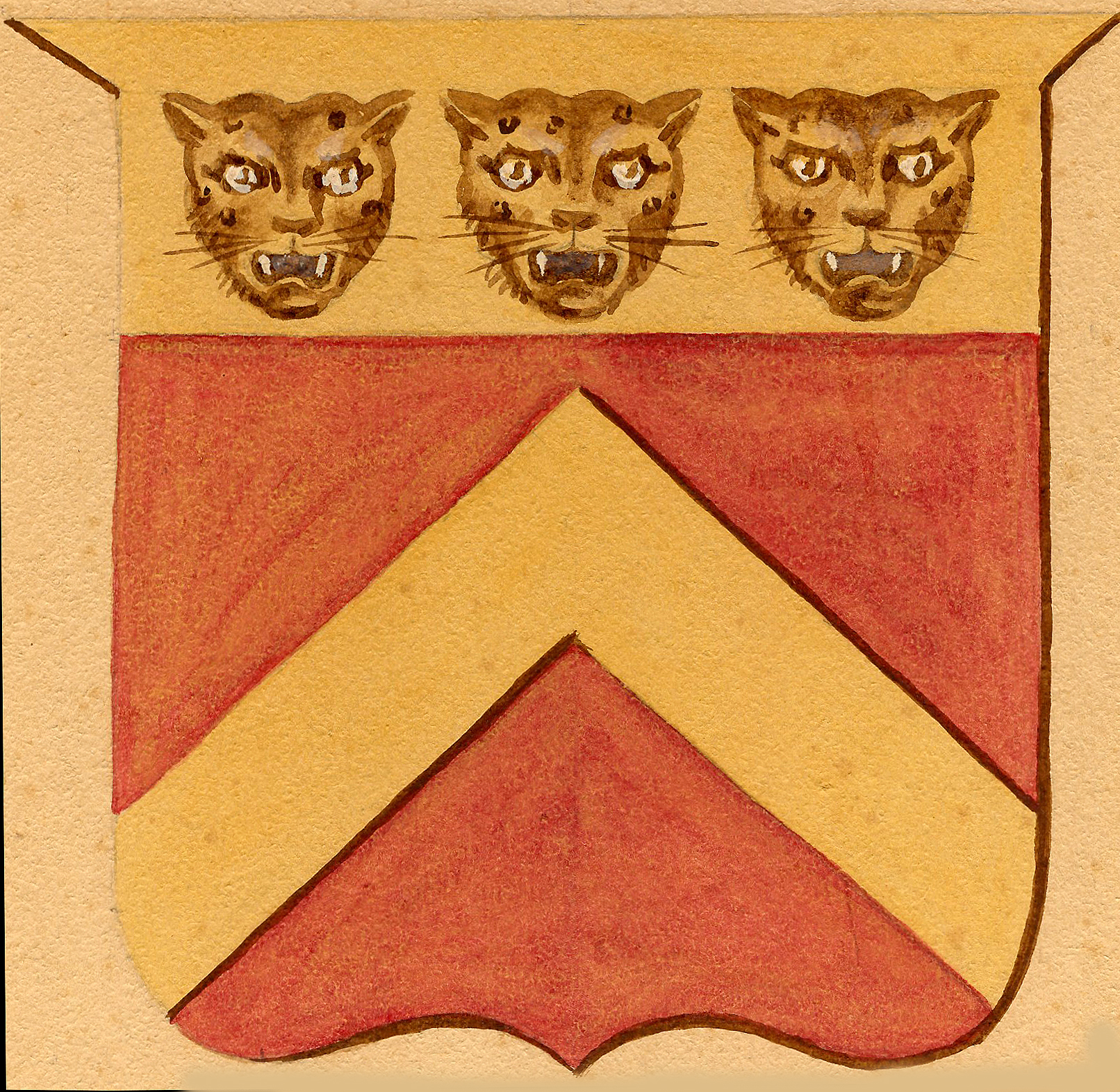
The Chew family's coat of arms

Chew was born the son of Samuel Chew, a physician and first Chief Justice of Delaware Colony, and Mary Galloway Chew. He was born in Anne Arundel County, Maryland, at his father's plantation, Maidstone. Benjamin Chew's great-great-grandfather, John Chew (1587–1668), a successful merchant, arrived in Jamestown in 1622 on the ship Charitie; he was granted 1,600 acres (6.5 km^{2}) of land in York County, Virginia.

The young Chew took an interest in the field of law at an early age. In 1736, when he was 15 years old, he began to read law in the Philadelphia offices of the former Attorney General of Pennsylvania Andrew Hamilton, who was then the speaker of the Pennsylvania House of Representatives. The year before, Hamilton won a landmark case in American jurisprudence by his eloquent pro bono defense of publisher Peter Zenger. It established the precedent of truth as an absolute defense against charges of libel.

Chew was strongly influenced by Hamilton's ideas about a free press, and also the reading materials that Hamilton provided him, especially Sir Francis Bacon's Lawtracts. His understanding of English legal history, and especially the Charter of Liberties, enhanced by his later studies at London's Middle Temple, fostered Chew's enduring commitment to the civil liberties that are guaranteed in the U.S. Constitution's First Amendment, especially the right to free speech.

After Hamilton's death in August 1741, Chew sailed to London to study law at the Honourable Society of the Middle Temple, one of four Inns of Court. He began attending London theatre and read what friends recommended; his journal during these years shows his process of adopting aspects of English refinement expected of gentlemen, which he continued after his return to the American colonies. Following his father's death, Chew returned to Pennsylvania in 1744, and began practicing law in Dover, Delaware, while supporting his siblings and stepmother.

Chew was raised in a Quaker family, but he broke with Quaker tradition in 1741, when he agreed with his father, who had instructed a grand jury in New Castle, Delaware on the lawfulness of resistance to an armed force. In 1747, at age 25, Chew also went against Quaker tradition when he took the Oath of Attorney in Pennsylvania.

== Career ==
=== Philadelphia attorney ===
In 1754, Chew moved to Philadelphia, where he continued his legal responsibilities in both Delaware Colony and the Province of Pennsylvania for the rest of his life. After early appointments in the Quaker-dominated government following his second marriage, he entered private practice in 1757; the following year joined the Anglican Church, and began a path to influence outside the Quaker elite.

Mentored by Andrew Hamilton from an early age, Chew was highly effective in defending civil liberties and settling boundary disputes; he represented William Penn's descendants and their proprietorships as the largest landholders in the Province of Pennsylvania, for over 60 years.

In 1757, Chew entered private practice. He derived most of his income from that, managing his second wife's considerable estate, and collecting quit-rents from his various properties. Chew continued the family practice of investing in land in the Thirteen Colonies until the end of his life, expanding their holdings in the colonial-era Province of Pennsylvania, Province of Maryland, Delaware Colony, and Province of New Jersey.

In his early career, Chew often met with other ambitious young Philadelphia men at the London Coffee House. In 1766, they organized the Gloucester Fox Hunting Club, the first in the United States. This adoption of an English sport was part of their becoming gentlemen; they committed to hunting together in the country a couple of times a week.

Chew was Speaker of the Lower House for the Delaware counties (1753–1758); Attorney General and member of the Council of Pennsylvania (1754–1769); Recorder of Philadelphia City (1755–1774); Master of Rolls (1755–1774; analogous to the Master of the Rolls role in England and Wales); and Provincial Councillor of Pennsylvania (1755).

In 1757, he also was elected a trustee of the Academy and College of Philadelphia, which later became the University of Pennsylvania, and continued as such until 1791. He also taught numerous law students. Foremost among Benjamin Chew's law students were Brigade Major Edward Tilghman and Judge William Tilghman. "These Tilghmans were so successful in the law that they were both offered the post of State Chief Justice in 1805."

He was selected as a Philadelphia commissioner (1761); appointed as Register-General of Wills (1765–1777); and as Chief Justice of the Supreme Court of Pennsylvania (1774–1777). During the American Revolutionary War, the Executive Council governing the new state removed him from office in 1777 and kept him in preventive detention in New Jersey until after the British forces left the Philadelphia region.

After the Revolutionary War, Chew resumed a position of influence in the new society and, eventually, its government. He was appointed a judge and president of the Pennsylvania High Court of Errors and Appeals (1791–1808), the court of last resort in the Commonwealth.

=== Mason–Dixon line ===
By the time he was 29 years old, Chew held a number of offices, both elected and appointed, in the Delaware and Pennsylvanian colonial governments. Appointed as Secretary of the Boundary Commission in 1750, Chew successfully represented the Penn family for the following eighteen years in their boundary dispute with first Charles Calvert, 5th Baron Baltimore and then Frederick Calvert, 6th Baron Baltimore of Maryland. The dispute was finally resolved in 1768, when the Boundary Commission oversaw the development and completion of the Mason–Dixon line between Pennsylvania and Maryland.

=== Albany Conference ===
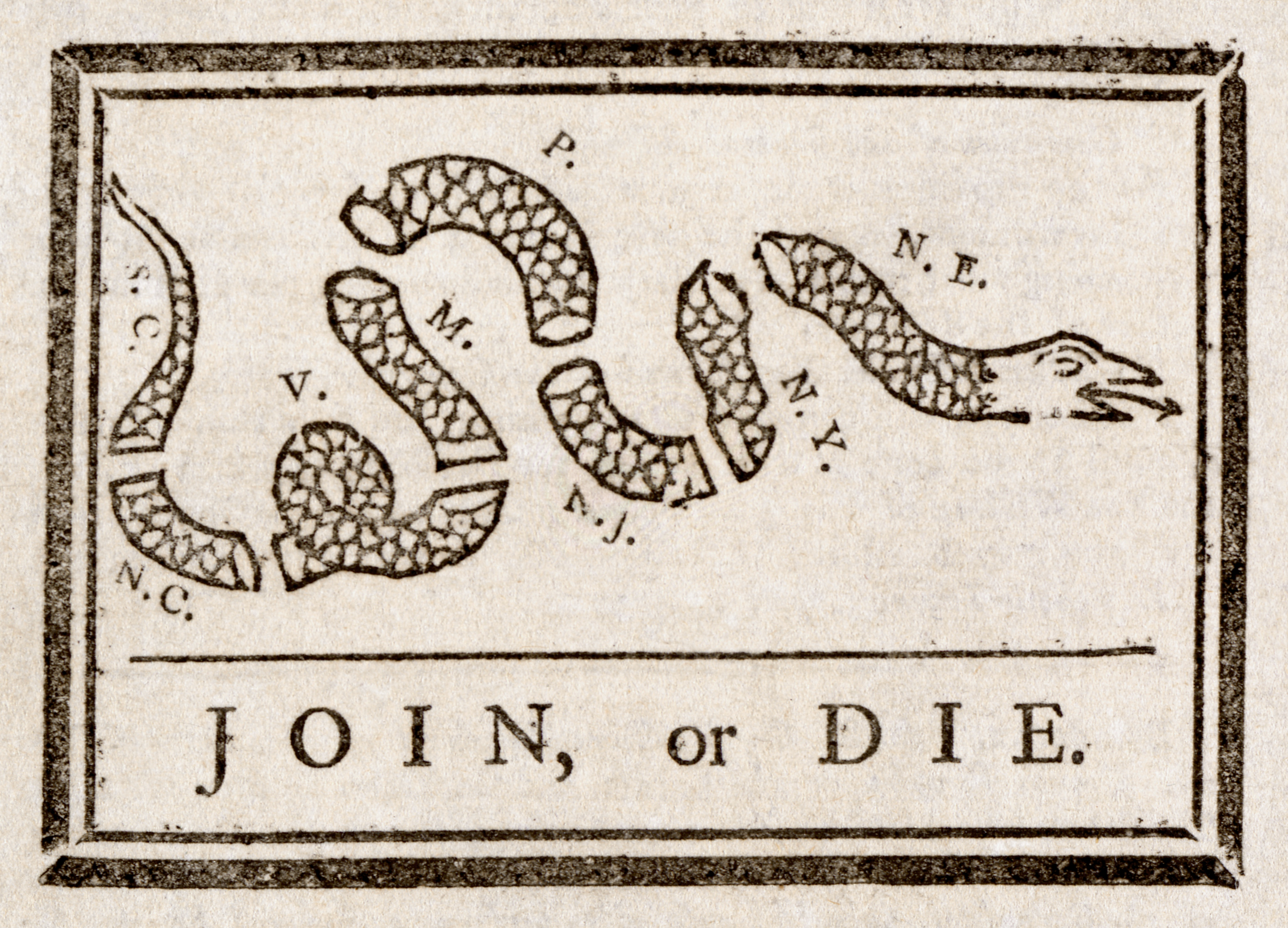
Benjamin Franklin's cartoon encouraging support for the pre-Revolution Continental Congress

On June 19, 1754, the Albany Congress was held in Albany, New York. Twenty-one representatives of New York, Pennsylvania, Maryland, Massachusetts, Rhode Island, Connecticut, and New Hampshire attended the Congress. Secretaries of each colony represented also attended, including Benjamin Chew of the Pennsylvania delegation. These secretaries helped formulate the plan to unite the colonies as a unified force at the time of threat from France during the Seven Years' War, known in North America as the French and Indian War, which began that year. The Albany Plan of Union was one of the first attempts to unite the British colonies. Benjamin Franklin proposed the plan but, as it greatly exceeded the scope of the congress, it was strongly debated by attendees. Six months later, Chew, aged 32, was appointed as Attorney General of the colony of Pennsylvania.

=== Easton Conference ===
In October 1758, The Easton Conference was held in Easton, Pennsylvania, to resolve conflicts created by The Walking Purchase of 1737, which had lasting effects on the relationships between Native Americans and the colonists. As Attorney General of Pennsylvania, Chew attended the negotiations for the Treaty of Easton and documented the proceedings in his "Journal of a Journey to Easton." The conference concluded on October 26, and in November, Governor Denny announced to the Pennsylvania Assembly that "a general peace was secured at Easton."

=== Attorney General ===
"From 1755 to 1769 Chew served as Attorney General of Pennsylvania and as the Recorder of Philadelphia, earning a reputation that was second to none." In a letter warning the Crown against enacting the Stamp Act, Attorney General Benjamin Chew described the mood in America: "…it is impossible to say to what length their irritated and turbulent Spirits may carry them." The Stamp Act was repealed two months later.

In 1768, Chew was elected to the revived American Philosophical Society.

=== Supreme Court Chief Justice ===
"Chew's political views were at all times close to those of his predecessor, William Allen. He supported the Proprietary interests, opposed the Stamp Act and other English abuses, but opposed independence." "The Chew court...was without a question the most professional and formally trained high court to date." "Chew's pro-American views and actions were not enough to save him, but he was not persecuted in the way that some pacifists were, as his record of speaking out against British abuses was well known. It was not until the following year that his liberty was restricted" by the Executive Council of

When he was finally paroled and sent to New Jersey for preventive detention as a suspected Loyalist, "Chew refused to take the action of the Council seriously at first, and thoroughly intimidated the young soldiers from the City Troop who were sent to pick him up. Eventually realizing his predicament he signed a parole...although he insisted that there was no charge against him except that he had held office under the Proprietor."

=== President of the High Court ===
After the state and national governments had been formed, in 1791, Chew was appointed by Thomas Mifflin, Pennsylvania's first Governor and the former President of the Continental Congress, to preside as the President over Pennsylvania's first High Court of Errors and Appeals. He held the position until he retired in 1808.

Pennsylvania at first made no provision for any appeal from its Supreme Court, but in February 1780 legislation established the Pennsylvania High Court of Errors and Appeals. It was empowered to hear appeals from the Supreme Court and also from the Court of Admiralty and the Register's Courts. Chew received the highest compliment Pennsylvania could pay him: he was appointed by Governor Thomas Mifflin as President of the High Court, despite the fact that he was by then close to seventy.

== Political influence ==
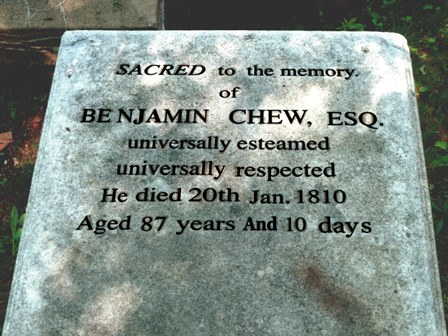
Chew's grave marker in St. Peter's Churchyard in Philadelphia

Prior to the American Revolution, Chew was friends with both George Washington and John Adams, and was a strong advocate for the colonies. As a lifelong pacifist, however, Chew believed that protest and reform were necessary to resolve the ongoing American conflicts with the British Parliament. Having been born and reared as a Quaker, he did not support active revolution. He maintained that position although he had left the Quakers and joined the Anglican Church in 1758. Early in the conflict, both the British and colonial sides claimed his allegiance since Chew had such a visible position in the colony and played so many important roles.

Chew was undecided about the correct course to take. "I have stated that an opposition of force of arms to the lawful authority of the king or his ministries…is high treason, but in the moment when the king or his ministries shall exceed the constitutional authority vested in them … submission to their mandates becomes treason." -Benjamin Chew, Chief Justice of Pennsylvania, in an address to the last provincial grand jury, April 10, 1776

On August 4, 1777, when General Howe and the British army were nearing Philadelphia, the Executive Council of the new government "issued a warrant for (Chew's) arrest on grounds of protecting the public safety. When the warrant was served two days later at his home in Philadelphia, Chew demanded to know 'by what authority and for what cause' he was charged." "As a lawyer, [Chew] believed that the warrant infringed on his rights as a free man; moreover, it violated the first principle of justice by prejudging him unheard. This, as he later recorded in notes concerning his arrest, 'struck at the liberties of everyone in the community and [he believed] it was his duty to oppose it and check it, if possible, in its infancy.'"

The Executive Council of the Continental Congress decided at the last minute against allowing Chew to remain at Cliveden. For his own safety, they decided to allow both Chew and the Governor John Penn to be paroled at his wife Elizabeth Chew's house, "Solitude," at the Union Forge Ironworks in High Bridge, New Jersey. Six months later, after the British forces left the region, both men returned to Philadelphia on May 15, 1778.

After the Revolution, Benjamin Chew's broad social circles continued to include representatives of many faiths, as well as friends and politicians with many disparate points of view. Chew continued to participate in the meetings of the Tammany Society, to honor Tamanend, the Lenni-Lenape chief who first negotiated peace agreements with William Penn. "Although Benjamin Chew was not a participant in the Constitutional Convention of 1787...he and his family were part of the city's new social circle that included the Washingtons, the John Adams, the William Binghams, and the Robert Morrises...In large measure this was because Chew's legal perspicacity offered expertise needed by the new government."

== Residences ==
=== Third Street House ===
Chew's coach

Chew's summer retreat Cliveden in the Germantown section of Philadelphia

In 1771, Chew purchased the former house of his client, Governor John Penn, on South Third Street in Philadelphia; Penn returned to England to settle his father Richard Penn Sr.'s estate. For almost five decades, the household on Third Street was filled by Benjamin and Elizabeth Chew, their son Benjamin, and their daughters Anna Marie, Elizabeth, Sarah, Margaret (Peggy), Juliana, Henrietta, Sophia, Maria, Harriet, and Catherine, all of whom were actively engaged in the social, civic, and cultural life of the nation's first capital. Three of the daughters retained ownership of the house until 1828.

The Chews entertained many visiting dignitaries, such as John Penn, Tench Francis Jr., Robert, Thomas, and Samuel Wharton, Thomas Willing, John Cadwalader, Chief Justice William Allen and his wife Margaret, daughter of Andrew Hamilton, Dr. William Smith, Provost of the College of Philadelphia, botanist John Bartram, Edward Shippen III, Edward Shippen IV, and Peggy Shippen, Thomas Mifflin, later to become Governor of Pennsylvania, and Brigadier General Henry Bouquet, hero of the French and Indian War.

Abigail Adams referred to Chews' daughters as part of a "constellation of beauties" in Philadelphia. Margaret Chew (1760–1824) married Maryland Governor John Eager Howard in 1787. Sophia (1769–1841) was invited to attend Martha Washington's first public event in Philadelphia. Harriet (1775–1861) was asked to entertain George Washington while his portrait was being painted. In 1800, she married the only son of Charles Carroll of Carrollton, signer of the Declaration of Independence, who built Homewood for them as a wedding gift. Throughout the Revolutionary War, George Washington aided the transfer of letters between Mr. and Mrs. Chew, during months when they were forced to live apart.

The Chew family's house on Third Street was situated between Spruce and Walnut Streets, next to the house of Samuel Powel, mayor of Philadelphia, and his wife, Elizabeth Willing Powel, who was one of George Washington's closest confidantes. "Led by Mrs. Washington, Mrs. Morris, and 'the dazzling Mrs. Bingham,' as Abigail Adams called her, the city embarked on a lavish program of public and private entertainment patterned on English and French models." Mrs. Adams reports being pleasantly surprised by "an agreeable society and friendliness kept up with all the principal families, who appear to live in great harmony, and we are met at all the parties [with] nearly the same company." After the death of their parents, Henrietta, Maria, and Catherine Chew vacated their house on South Third Street, and moved to a family-owned property on Walnut Street. In 1828, they sold the house on South Third Street, and in 1830, the building was razed.

=== Cliveden ===
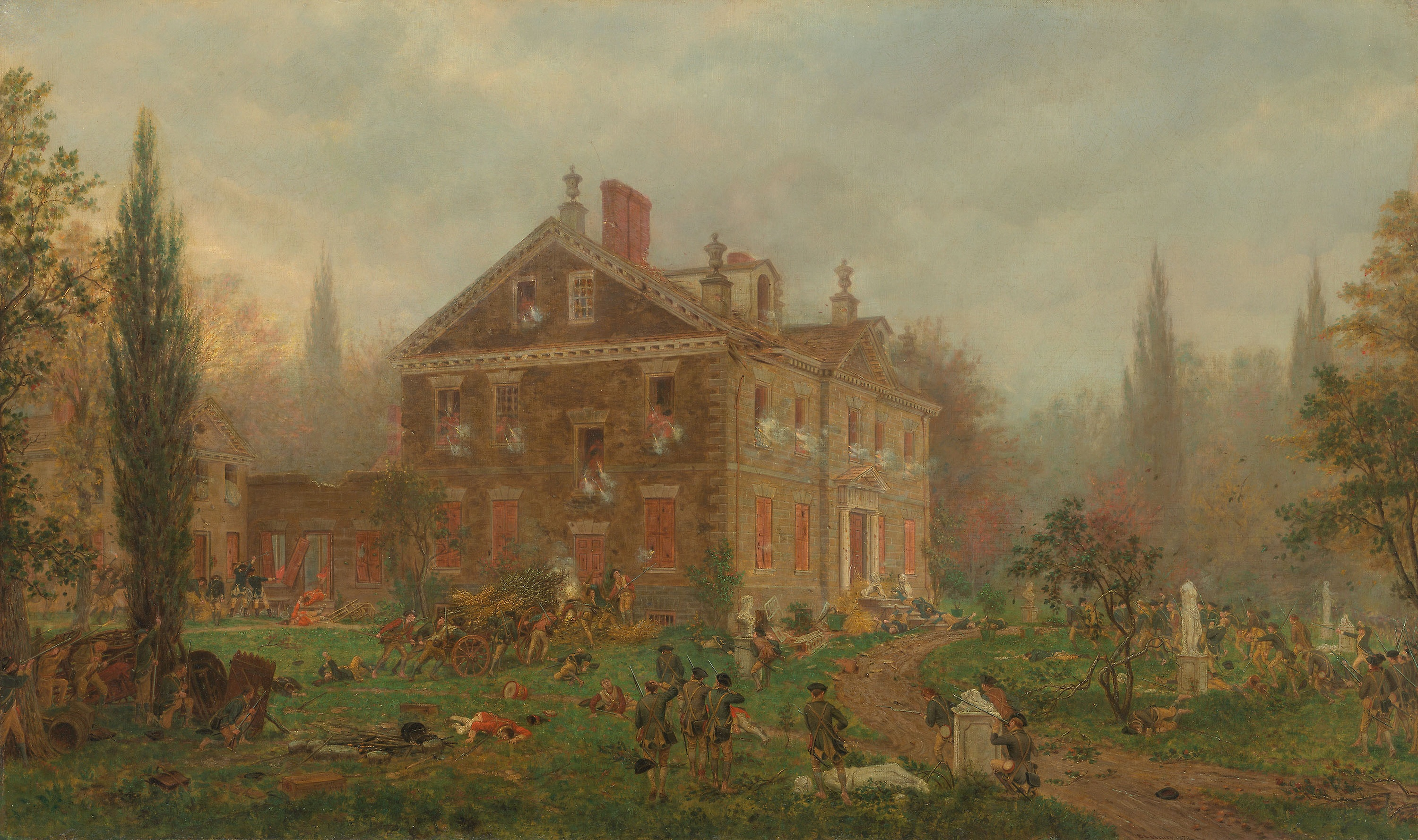
Fighting during the Battle of Germantown at the Chew house

To protect his family from the diseases that plagued Philadelphia, Chew chose Mennonite master builder, Jacob Knor, to build a summer retreat in Germantown, which he called Cliveden; the house later came to be known as the Chew house. Knor went on to construct several other buildings in Germantown, including the nearby Johnson House in 1768.

On August 4, 1777, when the Executive Committee of the Continental Congress decided to place Chew in preventive detention in New Jersey, his wife and children vacated Cliveden and returned to their Third Street home. With Cliveden vacant, General Howe, the British Commander-in-Chief, quickly seized the house. Protected by its strong walls, he won the Battle of Germantown on October 4.

After Chew was released from parole in May 1778, he decided to move his family to Whitehall, their estate in Delaware, to buffer them from the political turbulence of Philadelphia. Chew sold Cliveden to Blair McClenahan because he was unable to afford the extensive repairs necessary after the Battle of Germantown. While in Delaware, the Chews rented their house on Third Street to Don Juan de Miralles (the Spanish representative to the American government); the Marquis de Chastellux (principal liaison officer between the French Commander-in-Chief and George Washington); and to George and Martha Washington, from November 1781 to March 1782, during the Second Continental Congress.

By 1783, the Chews concluded that the political situation was safe enough for their family to return to Philadelphia. They lived full-time in the house on South Third Street during the formation of the United States: the Constitutional Convention; the Congress of the Confederation; and in 1792, the official adoption of the Bill of Rights by the First United States Congress.

In 1797, Chew bought back Cliveden. It remained under family ownership for another five generations. Cannonballs from the Battle of Germantown were embedded in its walls until 1972, when Chew's descendants donated the house to the National Trust for Historic Preservation. During restoration, most of the cannonballs were removed.

== Personal life ==
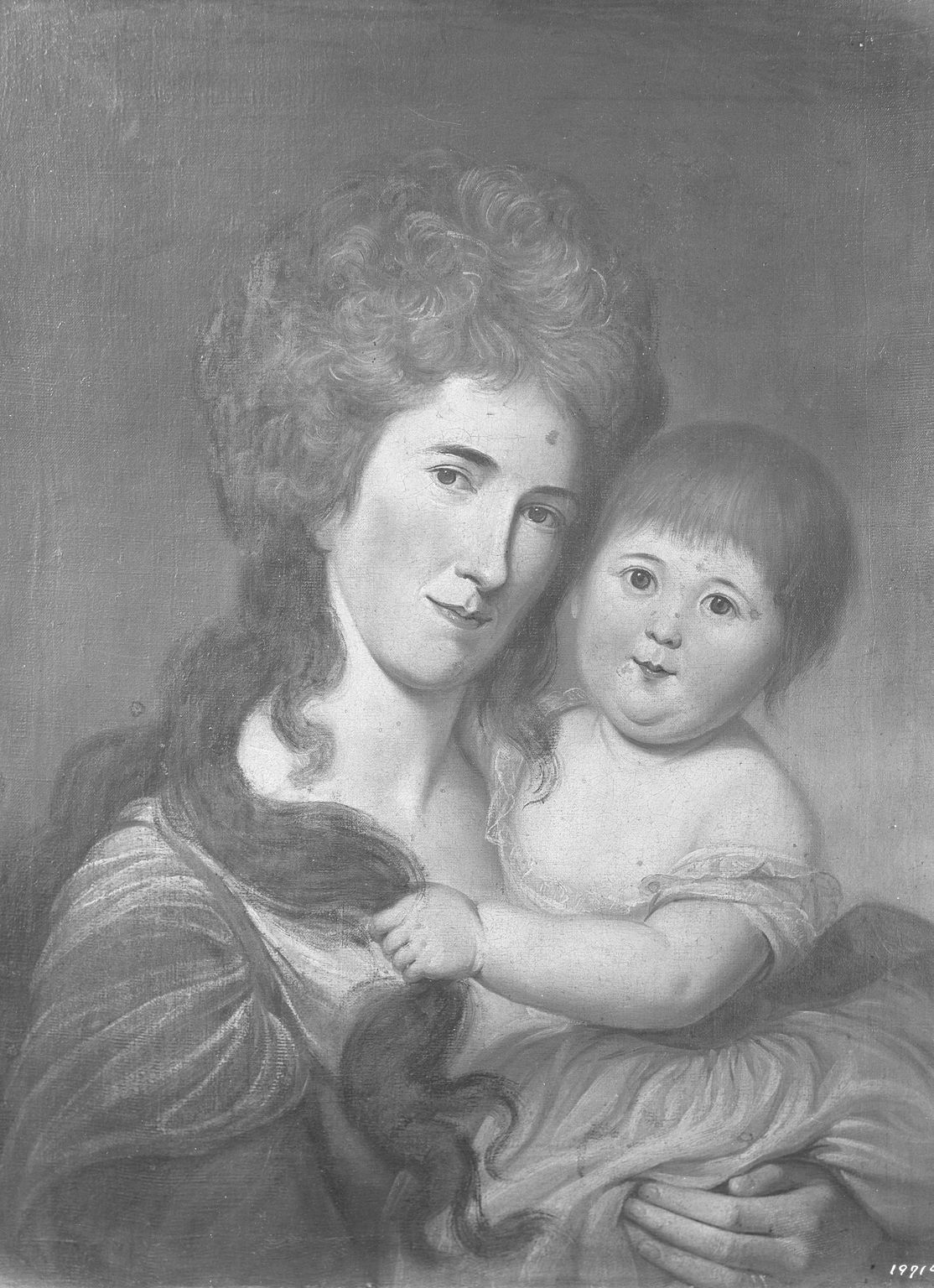
Peggy Chew Howard and John Eager Howard Jr., portrait by Charles Willson Peale

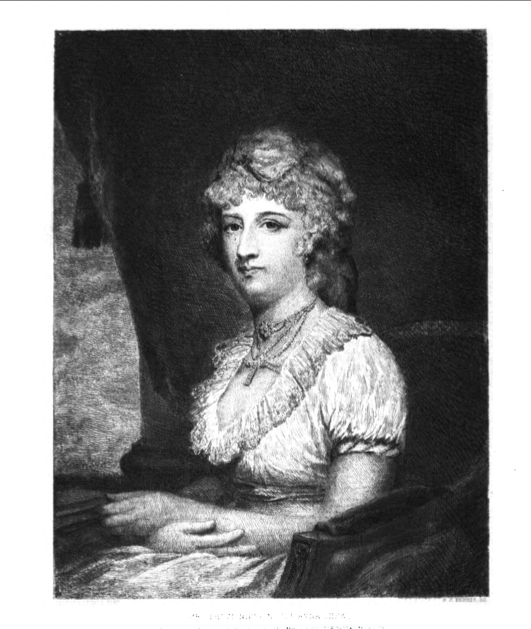
Chew's daughter Juliana Chew (Mrs. Philip Nicklin), mother of Sophia Chew Nicklin Dallas, Second Lady of the United States

Chew wed Mary Galloway, his first cousin, on June 13, 1747, at West River, Maryland. They had five daughters before Mary died. From 1754 to 1771, Chew and his family lived on Front Street in Philadelphia. He married again on September 12, 1757, to Elizabeth Oswald (1732–1819), daughter of James and Mary (Turner) Oswald. Elizabeth was the niece and heir to the estate of Captain Joseph Turner.

Benjamin and Elizabeth had seven more daughters, including Margaret "Peggy", and two sons.

In 1758, Chew left the Quakers permanently and joined the Church of England; he and his wife had their son Benjamin baptized that year at Christ Church. They worshipped there with their growing family, and later at St. Peter's Church when they moved out to Germantown. This was part of a process of Anglicization that had begun when he was studying law at the Middle Temple in London.

Chew greatly increased both his wealth and property holdings when he married Elizabeth Oswald. They held numerous slaves to care for the properties and cultivate their commodity crops. In 1760, on the Chew's property "Whitehall" in Delaware, Richard Allen, was born into slavery. In 1768, recognizing the boy's early genius, Chew sold Allen, then eight years old, and all members of his immediate family to Stokley Sturgis, a known abolitionist and owner of a neighboring property in Delaware. Richard Allen later became a preacher in the Methodist Church in Philadelphia, co-founder of the Free African Society, and the founder and first bishop of the African Methodist Episcopal Church, the first African American denomination in the United States.

== Death ==
After an extended illness, Chew died at Cliveden on January 13 or 20, 1810. He is buried at St. Peter's Churchyard in Philadelphia.

== Legacy ==
- In 1906, a portrait of Benjamin Chew was dedicated and installed in the Pennsylvania State Capitol building in Harrisburg, honoring his role as Chief Justice.
- Chew Avenue in Philadelphia is named in his honor.
- Chew Street in Allentown, Pennsylvania is named in his honor.
- In 1942, the Liberty ship, the Benjamin Chew, was built and named in his honor. The ship was constructed at the Bethlehem-Fairfield Shipyards in Baltimore.
- Chewton, Pennsylvania in Lawrence County was named after Benjamin Chew. As a land speculator, Chew was estimated to own over 30,000 acres in Western Pennsylvania.

== See also ==
- Reverend Richard Allen, the founder and first Bishop of the African Methodist Episcopal Church, was a former slave whose parents were enslaved by Chew. In 1768, Chew sold Richard Allen, along with all members of his family, to his friend and neighbor Stokeley Sturgis.

Legal offices
Preceded by William Allen	Chief Justice, Supreme Court of Pennsylvania; 1774–1777	Succeeded by Thomas McKean
Political offices
