= Maidstone (Owings, Maryland) =

Historic house in Maryland, United States

- U.S. National Register of Historic Places
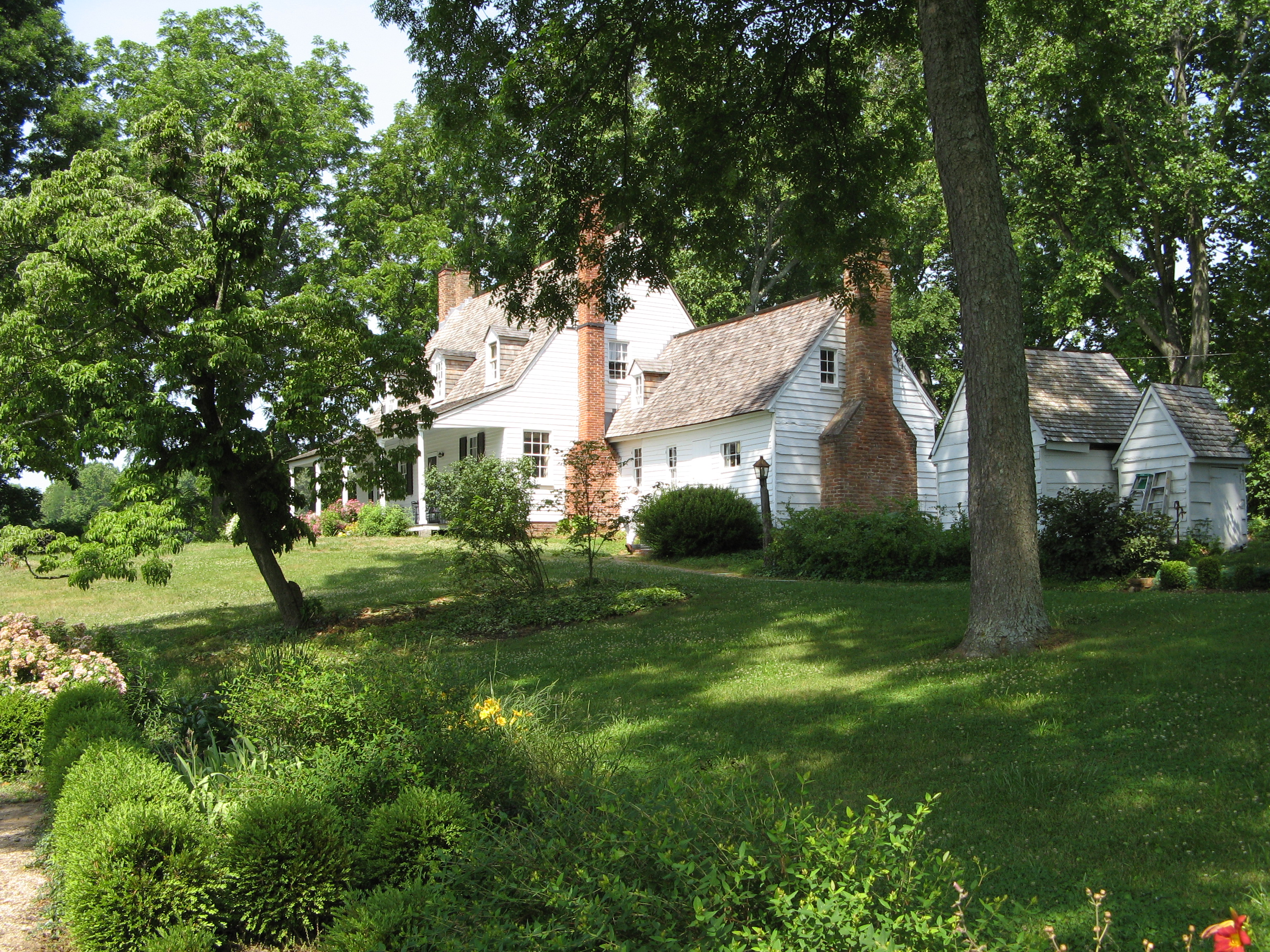
- Maidstone Plantation house, June 2007

- Location within Maryland Location within the United States
- Location: Chesapeake Beach Rd., Owings, Maryland
- Coordinates: 38°44′5″N 76°37′38″W
- NRHP reference No.: 71000370
- Added to NRHP: June 21, 1971

Maidstone is an old southern Maryland plantation located in Owings, Calvert County, Maryland. The oldest extant part of the house was built in 1751 by a yeoman planter, Lewis Lewin on or near the site of an earlier wood structure., though a brick in one of the chimneys is dated 1678.

== The house ==
Maidstone was built as a medieval-style house with a roof progressing upwards, which extends out over the north and south facades of the house to form a porch in what many consider is traditional Maryland Colonial style. There are two outbuildings with old beams and rough-hewn horizontal siding. The grounds are well maintained, and there are stands of very old boxwood.

== Ownership ==
Maidstone Plantation was originally in Anne Arundel County in the Province of Maryland prior to boundary shift. It was owned by three generations of the Chew family over a span of more than 60 years, including Benjamin Chew (1671–1700), his son Samuel Chew (1693–1743) and grandson Benjamin Chew (1722–1810). In 1745, Maidstone was sold to an Anne Arundel County, Maryland farmer, Lewis Lewin. In 1755, Thomas Whittington and his wife Wilhelmina Powell purchased Maidstone with the proceeds from the sale of a portion of her inheritance, a plantation called Gory Banks. The couple built their "Dwelling house" and lived there until the death of each and Maidstone became the family dwelling home for three succeeding generations. By indenture dated April 9, 1783, Thomas Whittington purchased an additional 100 acres from Lewis Lewin's son, Samuel Lewin. The purchase included "Several Parts of Tracts or Parcells of Land following being part of Three Tracts of Land called and Known by the names of Halls Hills, Mackalls Hills and Maidstone."

Thomas Whittington's will, which was probated February 9, 1786, gave one half of his land containing Maidstone "where my Dwelling house stands" to his oldest son John. His second son, Thomas, received the other half of the land containing Gory Banks, while the third son, Benjamin, received 177 Pounds in lieu of land.

In John Whittington's will, dated August 31, 1817, he stated that he had purchased the remainder of Maidstone from William Weems, Trustee for the real estate of Captain William Weems. Maidstone now contained three hundred and forty acres and was "the plantation upon which I now reside." Following John Whittington's death, Maidstone became the property of his second wife, Elizabeth Scrivener Whittington. After her death, it became the property of John Whittington's daughter, Mary, who married Henry Childs on June 26, 1820. Therefore, Maidstone Plantation passed into the Childs family and was no longer the Whittington plantation.

== National Register of Historic Places ==
Maidstone was listed on the National Register of Historic Places in 1971.

== See also ==
- Tulip Hill
