= Battle of Germantown =

1777 battle of the Philadelphia campaign

- Part of the Philadelphia campaign
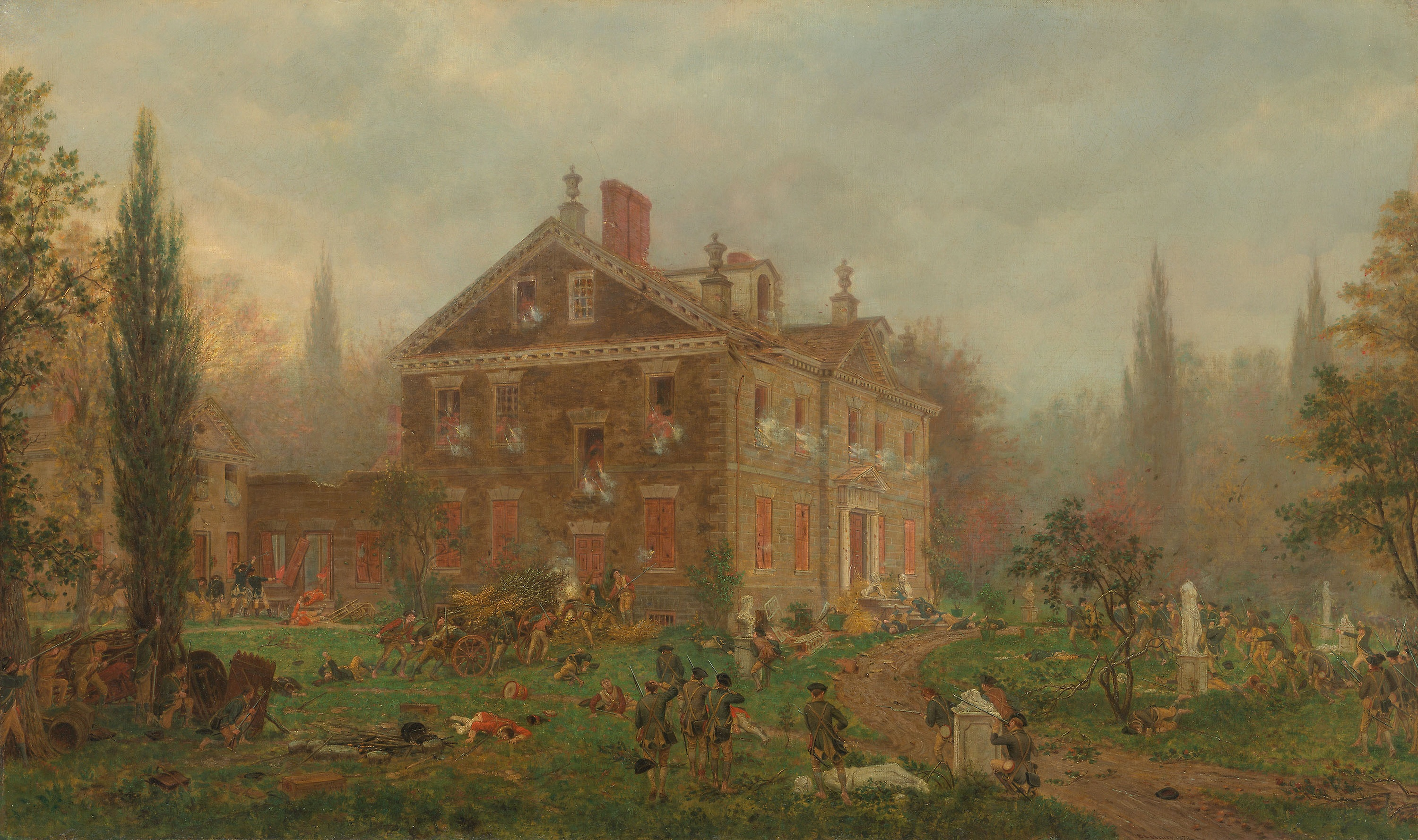
- 1878 painting of the battle
Date	October 4, 1777
Location	Germantown, Pennsylvania 40.0238°N 75.1597°W
Result	British victory

Belligerents
Great Britain; Hesse-Kassel	United States

Commanders and leaders
Sir William Howe; Charles Cornwallis; Wilhelm Knyphausen	George Washington

Strength
9,000	11,000

Casualties and losses
71 killed 448 wounded 14 missing	152 killed 521 wounded 438 captured

The Battle of Germantown was a major engagement in the Philadelphia campaign of the American Revolutionary War. It was fought on October 4, 1777, at Germantown, Pennsylvania, between the British Army led by General Sir William Howe and the American Continental Army under General George Washington.

After defeating the Continental Army at the Battle of Brandywine on September 11, and the Battle of Paoli on September 20, Howe outmaneuvered Washington, seizing Philadelphia, the capital of the United States, on September 26. Howe left a garrison of some 3,000 troops in Philadelphia, while moving the bulk of his force to Germantown, then an outlying community of the city. Learning of the division, Washington determined to engage the British. His plan called for four separate columns to converge on the British position at Germantown. The two flanking columns were composed of 3,000 militia, while the center-left, under Nathanael Greene, the center-right under John Sullivan, and the reserve under Lord Stirling were made up of regular troops. The ambition behind the plan was to surprise and destroy the British force, much in the same way as Washington had surprised and decisively defeated the Hessians at Trenton. In Germantown, Howe had his light infantry and the 40th Foot spread across his front as pickets. In the main camp, Wilhelm von Knyphausen commanded the British left, while Howe himself personally led the British right.

A heavy fog caused a great deal of confusion among the approaching Americans. After a sharp contest, Sullivan's column routed the British pickets. Unseen in the fog, around 120 men of the 40th Foot barricaded Cliveden. When the American reserve moved forward, Washington made the decision to launch repeated assaults on the position, all of which failed with heavy casualties. Penetrating several hundred yards beyond the mansion, Sullivan's wing became dispirited, running low on ammunition and hearing cannon fire behind them. As they withdrew, Anthony Wayne's division collided with part of Greene's late-arriving wing in the fog. Mistaking each other for the enemy, they opened fire, and both units retreated. Meanwhile, Greene's left-center column threw back the British right. With Sullivan's column repulsed, the British left outflanked Greene's column. The two militia columns had only succeeded in diverting the attention of the British, and had made no progress before they withdrew.

Despite the defeat, France, already impressed by the American success against Burgoyne at Saratoga, decided to lend greater aid to the Americans. Howe did not vigorously pursue the defeated Americans, instead turning his attention to clearing the Delaware River of obstacles at Red Bank and Fort Mifflin. After unsuccessfully attempting to draw Washington into combat at White Marsh, Howe withdrew to Philadelphia. Washington, his army intact, withdrew to Valley Forge, where he wintered and retrained his forces.

== Background ==
The Philadelphia campaign had begun badly for the Americans. Washington's Continental Army suffered a string of defeats at Cooch's Bridge, Brandywine, and Paoli. After inflicting a stinging defeat on Anthony Wayne's division at Paoli on September 20, the British army marched north to Valley Forge then west to the French Creek bridge. At this point, Howe's right wing faced Fatland Ford on the Schuylkill River near Valley Forge while the left wing was opposite Gordon's Ford at French Creek and the left center faced Richardson's Ford. The American army defended all these Schuylkill crossings, plus one farther downstream at Swede's Ford near Norristown. On September 22, a small British force under Sir William Erskine feinted north and another force mounted a demonstration at Gordon's Ford. Howe's moves convinced Washington that the British commander was trying to seize his supply base at Reading and turn his right flank. Washington moved north, but in the night of September 22–23, the British army reversed direction. They crossed the Schuylkill at Fatland and Richardson's Fords without opposition, and after a brief rest, headed downstream toward Swede's Ford where the American militia abandoned three cannons.

Charles Cornwallis subsequently seized Philadelphia for the British on September 26, dealing a blow to the revolutionary cause. Howe left a garrison of 3,462 men to defend the city, moving the bulk of his force north, some 9,728 men, to the outlying community of Germantown. With the campaigning season drawing to a close, Howe determined to locate and destroy the main American army. Howe established his headquarters at the Stenton Mansion, the former country home of James Logan.

Despite having suffered successive defeats, Washington saw an opportunity to entrap and decisively defeat the divided British army. He resolved to attack the Germantown garrison, as the last effort of the year before entering winter quarters. His plan called for a complex, ambitious assault; four columns of troops were to assail the British garrison from different directions, at night, with the goal of creating a double-envelopment. Washington's hope was that the British would be surprised and overwhelmed much how the Hessians were at Trenton.

=== British positions ===
Germantown was a hamlet of stone houses, spreading from what is now known as Mount Airy on the north, to what is now Market Square in the south. Extending southwest from Market Square was Schoolhouse Lane, running 1.5 miles (2.4 km) to the point where Wissahickon Creek emptied from a steep gorge, into the Schuylkill River. Howe had established his main camp along the high ground of Schoolhouse and Church lanes. The western wing of the camp, under the command of Hessian general Wilhelm von Knyphausen, had a picket of two Jäger battalions, positioned on the high ground above the mouth of the Wissahickon to the far left. A brigade of Hessians and two brigades of British regulars camped along Market Square. East of the square, two British brigades under the command of General James Grant had encamped, with two squadrons of dragoons, and the 1st battalion of Light Infantry. The Queen's Rangers, a unit of loyalist Americans recruited from New York, covered the right flank.

=== American advance ===
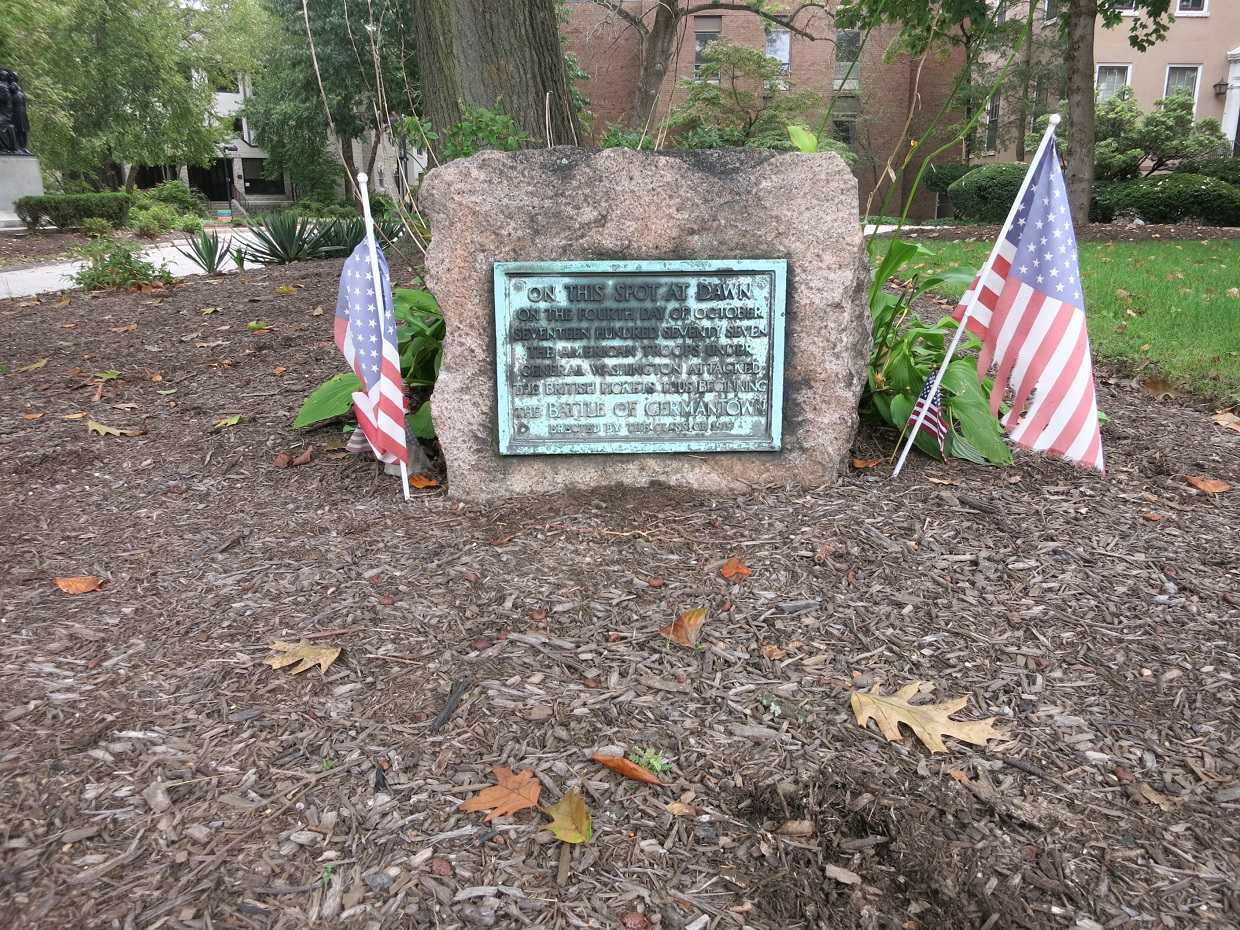
Battle marker at the Lutheran Seminary on Germantown Ave

After dusk on October 3, the American force began the 16-mile (26 km) march southward toward Germantown in complete darkness. To differentiate friend from foe in the darkness, the troops were instructed to put a piece of white paper in their hats to mark them out. The Americans remained undetected by the Jäger pickets, and the main British camp was subsequently unaware of the American advance. For the Americans, their attempt to repeat their victory at Trenton seemingly was on the road to success. The darkness made communications between the American columns extremely difficult, though, and progress was far slower than expected. At dawn, most of the American forces had fallen too short of their intended positions, losing the element of surprise they otherwise enjoyed.

The Pennsylvania Militia, led by Brigadier General John Armstrong Sr., advanced down the Manatawny Road (Ridge Avenue) to the confluence of the Wissahickon Creek and Schuylkill River. There on the cliffs opposite General Knyphausen's Hessian encampment, the militia set up their artillery and began a desultory fire until withdrawing back up the Manatawny road. Armstrong's Brigade played no further part in the battle. The three remaining American columns continued their advance. One column, under the command of General John Sullivan moved down Germantown Road. A column of New Jersey militia under Brigadier General William Smallwood moved down Skippack Road to Whitemarsh Church Road, and from there to Old York Road to attack the British right. General Nathanael Greene's column, consisting of Greene's, General Adam Stephen's divisions and General Alexander McDougall's brigade, moved down Limekiln Road.

== Battle ==
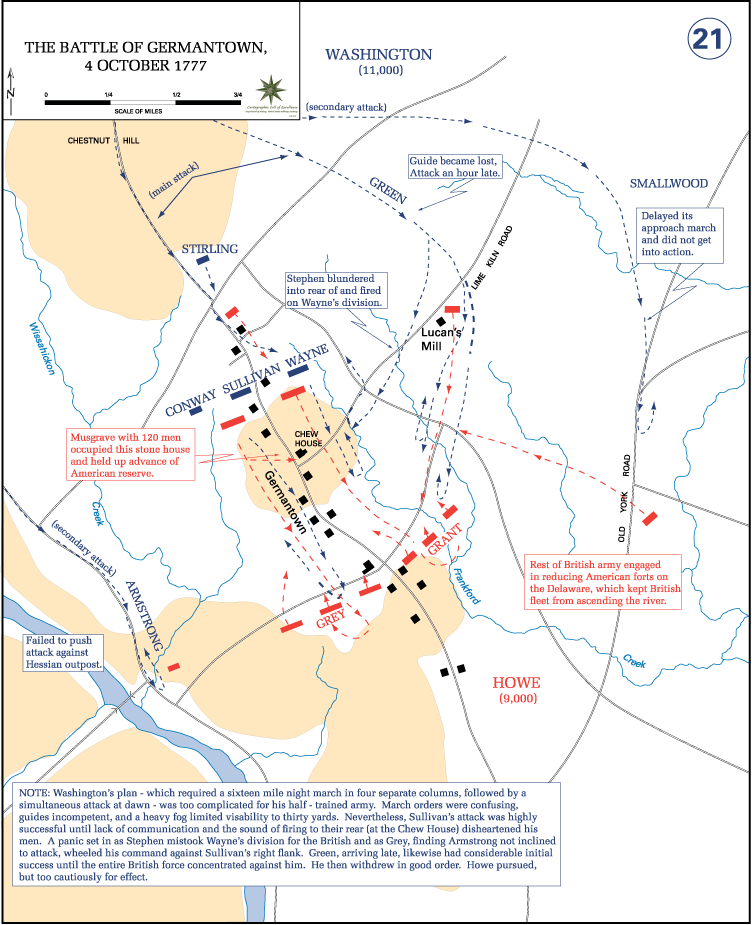
Map of the battle British, Hessian and Loyalist forces Continental Army and Militia forces

A thick fog clouded the battlefield throughout the day, greatly hampering coordination. The vanguard of Sullivan's column, upon Germantown Road, opened fire upon the British pickets on Mount Airy, just after sunrise at 05:00. The British pickets fired their cannon in alarm, and resisted the American advance. Howe rode forward, thinking they were being attacked by foraging or skirmishing parties, and ordered his men to hold their ground. It took a substantial part of Sullivan's division to finally overwhelm the British pickets, and drive them back into Germantown.

Howe, still believing his men were facing only light opposition, called out; "For shame, Light Infantry! I never saw you retreat before! Form! Form! It is only a scouting party!" Just then, three American guns came into action, opening fire with grapeshot. Howe and his staff quickly withdrew out of range. Several British officers were shocked to see their own soldiers rapidly falling back before the enemy attack. One British officer later described the number of attacking Americans as "overwhelming".

Cut off from the main force, Lieutenant Colonel Thomas Musgrave, of the British 40th Regiment of Foot, ordered his six companies of troops, around 120 men, to barricade and fortify the stone house of Pennsylvania Chief Justice Benjamin Chew, which was known as Cliveden. The American troops launched a determined assault against Cliveden; however, the outnumbered defenders repulsed their attempts, inflicting heavy casualties. Washington called a council of war to decide how to deal with the fortification. Some of his subordinates favoured bypassing Cliveden entirely, leaving a regiment behind to besiege it. However, Washington's artillery commander, Brigadier General Henry Knox, advised it was unwise to allow a fortified garrison to remain under enemy control in the rear of a forward advance. Washington concurred.

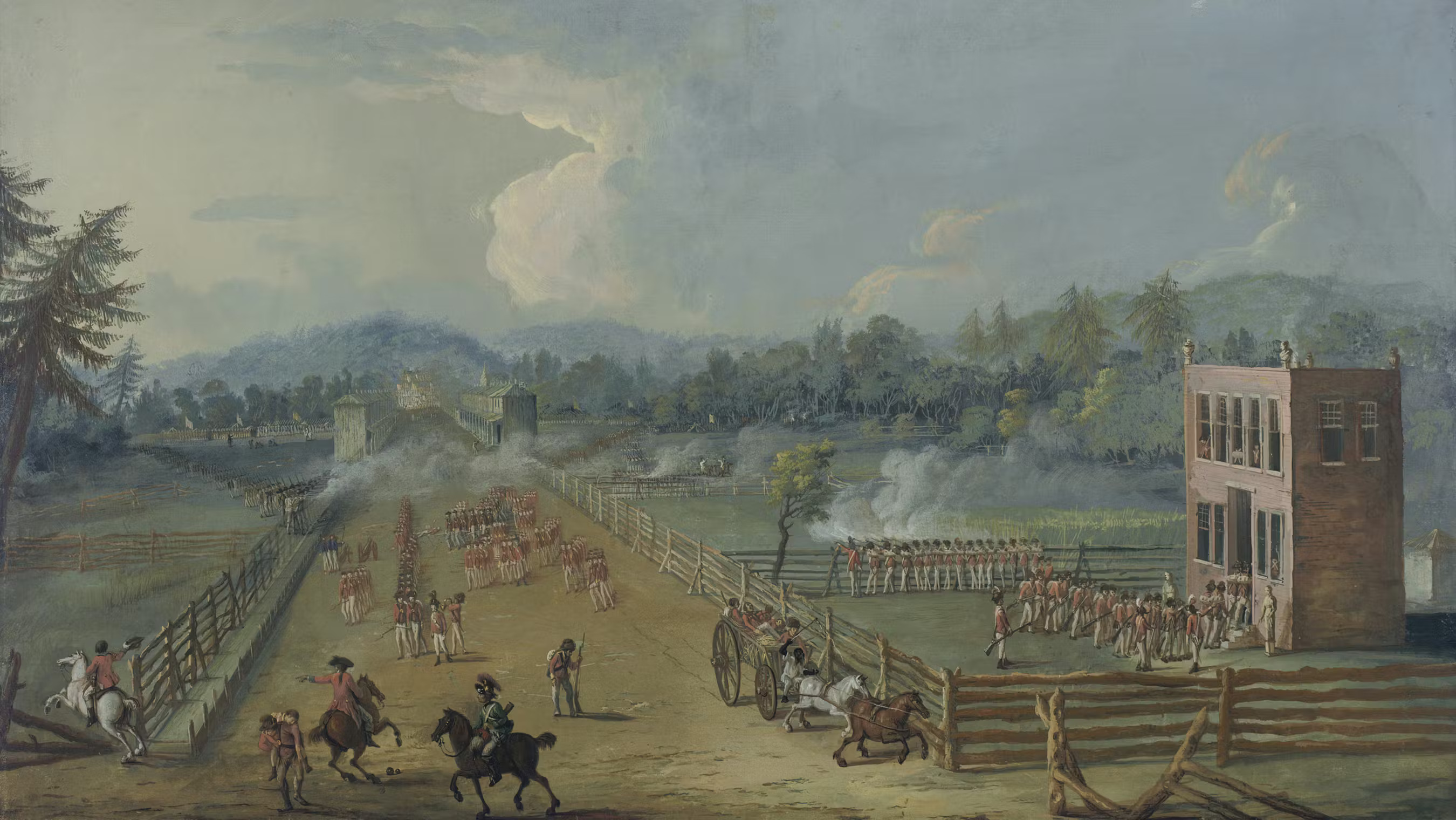
1782 painting of the battle

General William Maxwell's brigade, which had been held in reserve, was brought forward to storm Cliveden, partially led by a volunteer aide from General Washington's own staff, Lieutenant Colonel John Laurens, who had been shot through his right and dominant shoulder earlier in the battle; he had continued to fight with his aide riband wrapped around his arm and his sword in his left and non-dominant hand. Knox positioned four 3-pound cannon out of musket range to bombard the mansion. However, the thick walls of Cliveden withstood the bombardment from the light field guns. The Americans launched a second wave of infantry assaults, all of which were repulsed with heavy losses. The few Americans who managed to get inside the mansion were shot or bayoneted. It was becoming clear to the Americans that Cliveden was not going to be taken easily. Among this assault was Lieutenant John Marshall of the Virginia Line, the future Chief Justice of the United States, who was wounded during the attack.

Before completely disregarding the notion of taking Cliveden, Laurens was offered the idea of burning or smoking the British out of the house. He took the idea and, according Gregory Massey's biography, he sent men to gather firewood to pile at the door. Once enough had gathered, Laurens and Marshall began to command the attack of charging to the front steps, dropping the firewood, and in groups, rushing to set fire to the wood. Laurens himself was sent forward with a torch with his companion, Major John White. The fire did not catch. While on the front steps of Cliveden, however, Laurens was under a barrage of gunfire and supposedly wounded a second time by a bayonet in his left side. Major White was shot and later pronounced dead. Both men were forced from the door and the Chevalier de Mauduit convinced Laurens to cease his fighting before he later was moved to have a surgeon see to his wounds.

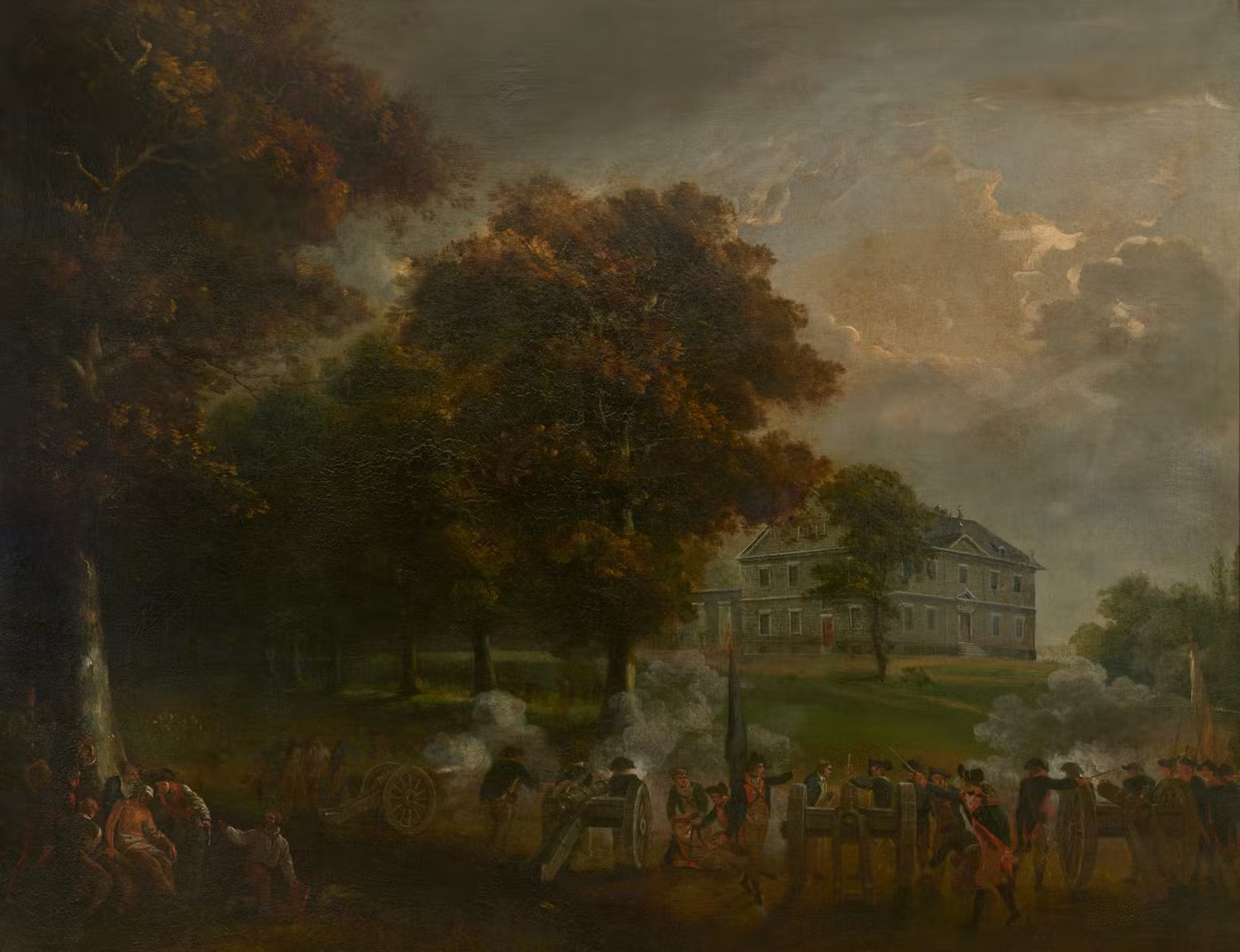
American artillery bombarding Cliveden during the battle

Prior to Maxwell's futile attack against Cliveden, Sullivan's division advanced beyond in the fog. Sullivan deployed Brigadier General Thomas Conway's brigade to the right, and Brigadier General Anthony Wayne's brigade to the left before advancing on the British center-left. The 1st and 2nd Maryland Brigades of Sullivan's column paused frequently to fire volleys into the fog. While the tactic was effective in suppressing enemy opposition, his troops rapidly ran low on ammunition. Wayne's brigade to the left of the road moved ahead, and became precariously separated from Sullivan's main line. As the Americans launched their attack on Cliveden, Wayne's brigade heard the disquieting racket from Knox's artillery pieces to their rear. To their right, the firing from Sullivan's men died down as the Marylanders ran low on ammunition. Wayne's men began to panic in their apparent isolation, and so he ordered them to fall back. Sullivan was subsequently forced back, although the regiments fought a stubborn rear-guard action. Since the British units pursuing them were redirected to fight Greene's column, Sullivan's men fell back in good order.

Meanwhile, Nathanael Greene's column on Limekiln Road had finally caught up with the bulk of the Americans at Germantown. Greene's vanguard engaged the British pickets at Luken's Mill, driving them back after a savage skirmish. The fog that clung to the field was compounded by palls of smoke from the cannon and musket fire, throwing Greene's column into disarray and confusion. One of Greene's brigades, under Brigadier General Adam Stephen, veered off-course and began following Meetinghouse Road, instead of rendezvousing at Market Square with the rest of Greene's troops. The wayward brigade collided with Wayne's brigade, and mistook them for British troops. The two American brigades opened fire on each other in the fog, causing both to flee. The withdrawal of Wayne's New Jersey Brigade, having suffered heavy losses attacking Cliveden, left Conway's right flank exposed.

To the north, an American column led by McDougall came under attack by the Loyalist troops of the Queen's Rangers, and the Guards of the British reserve. After a brutal contest, McDougall's brigade was forced to retreat, having suffered heavy losses. Despite the reversal in fortune, the Continentals were still convinced of a possible victory. The 9th Virginia Regiment of Greene's column launched a determined attack on the British lines as planned, managing to break through and capturing a number of prisoners. However, they were soon surrounded by two arriving British brigades under Cornwallis. Cornwallis then launched a counter-charge, cutting off the Virginians completely, forcing them to surrender. Greene, upon learning of the main army's defeat and withdrawal, realized he stood alone against Howe's entire army, and so withdrew.

The primary attacks on the British and Hessian camp had all been repulsed with heavy casualties. Washington ordered Armstrong and Smallwood's men to withdraw. Maxwell's brigade, still having failed to capture Cliveden, was forced to fall back. Howe ordered a pursuit, harrying the retreating Americans for some 9 miles (14 km), though he did not follow up on his victory. The pursuing British forces were finally forced to retire in the face of resistance from Greene's infantry, Wayne's artillery, and a detachment of dragoons, as well as the coming of the night.

On October 6, there was a brief cease-fire. A little terrier that was identified from its collar as belonging to General Howe was formally transferred from Washington's camp to Howe's under a flag of truce. The little terrier that had been found wandering on the battlefield was brought to Washington, who had the dog fed, cleaned and brushed before being returned to Howe.

== Casualties ==
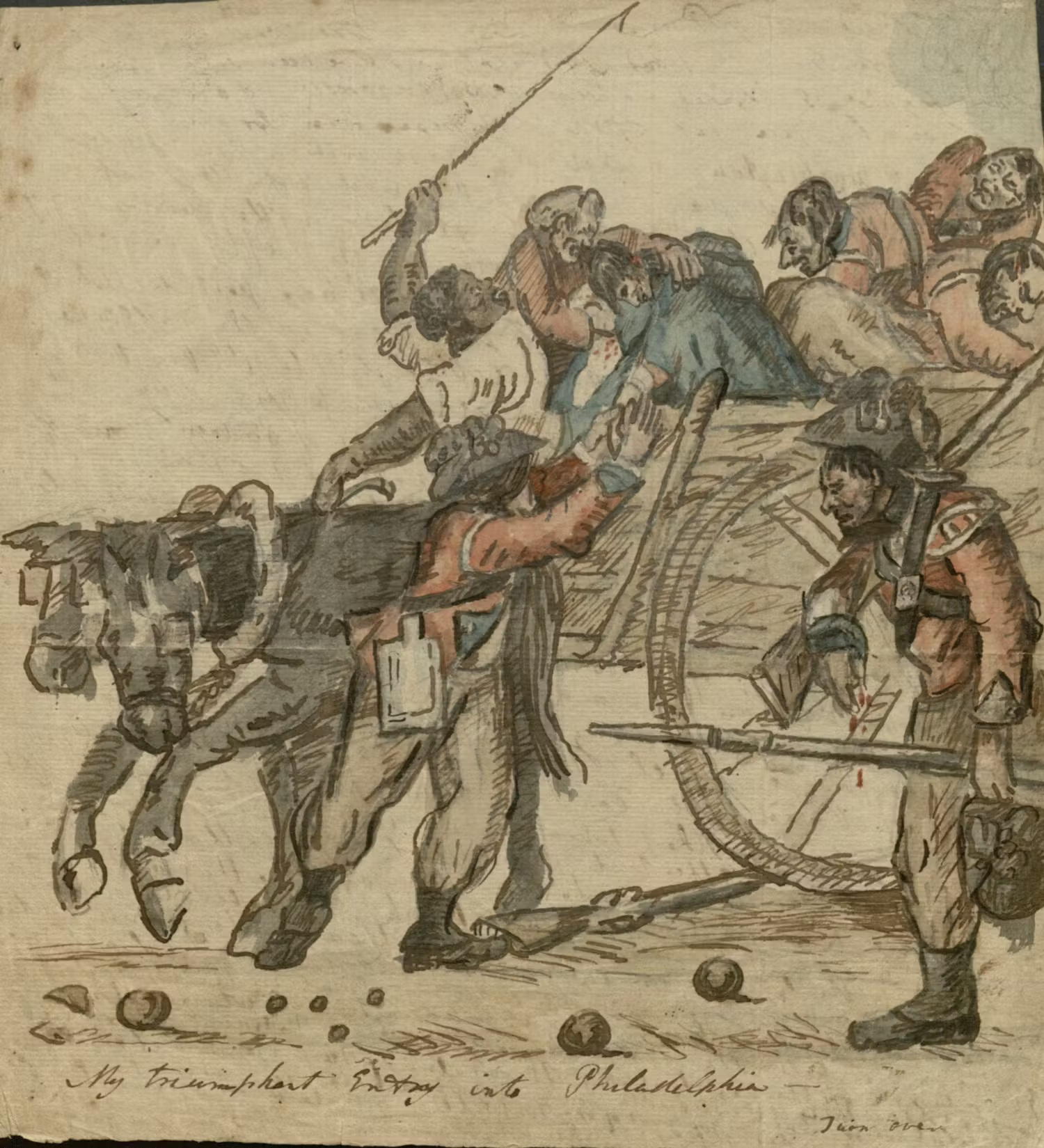
British casualties entering Philadelphia following the battle

Of the 11,000 men Washington led into battle, 30 officers and 122 men were killed, and 117 officers and 404 men were wounded. According to a Hessian staff officer, some 438 had been taken prisoner by the British, including Colonel George Mathews and the entire 9th Virginia Regiment. Brigadier General Francis Nash, whose North Carolina brigade covered the American retreat, had his left leg taken off by a cannonball, and died on October 8 at the home of Adam Gotwals. His body was interred with military honors on October 9 at the Mennonite Meetinghouse in Towamencin. Major John White, who was shot at Cliveden, died on October 10. Lieutenant-Colonel William Smith, who was wounded carrying the flag of truce to Cliveden, also died from his wounds. In total, 57 Americans, over one-third of all those killed in the battle, died in the attack on Cliveden.

British casualties in the battle were 71 killed, 448 wounded and 14 missing; only 24 of whom were Hessians. British officers killed in action include Brigadier General James Agnew and Lieutenant-Colonel John Bird. Lieutenant-Colonel William Walcott of the 5th Regiment of Foot was mortally wounded, and later died. Wyck House served as a hospital during the battle.

== Analysis ==
Washington's ambitious plan failed for several factors:

- Washington mistakenly believed his troops were sufficiently trained and experienced to launch such a complicated, coordinated assault.
- Success of the plan required constant communication between the many columns of his army and precise timing. Communication was lackluster because of the night march, and it was further handicapped by the fog.
- When the 40th Foot put up stubborn resistance, Stephen disobeyed orders and attempted to capture Cliveden. All attempts were repulsed, and Stephen was later court-martialed and cashiered from military service after evidence surfaced that he was intoxicated during the battle.

Washington had intended for his attack to be a second Trenton. Had everything gone according to plan, Washington may have trapped and destroyed a second major British force. Coupled with Burgoyne's defeat at Saratoga, the defeat of Howe at Germantown could have compelled Lord North and the British government to sue for peace.

== Aftermath ==
Designations

Pennsylvania Historical Marker
- Official name: Battle of Germantown
- Type: City
- Criteria: American Revolution, George Washington, Military
- Designated: October 05, 1996

The battle was a victory for the British, but the long-term strategic consequences favored the Americans. Howe had, once again, failed to follow up on his success and allowed Washington to escape with his army, leading to their encampment at Valley Forge.

The battle in particular made a strong impression upon the French court that the Americans would prove worthy allies. Sir George Otto Trevelyan, in Volume IV of his History of the American Revolution, concluded that although the battle had unquestionably been a defeat for the Americans, it was of "great and enduring service to the American cause". In particular, the engagement persuaded the Comte de Vergennes to vouch for the United States against Britain. He continues:

That the battle had been fought unsuccessfully was of small importance when weighed against the fact that it been fought at all. Eminent generals, and statesmen of sagacity, in every European Court were profoundly impressed by learning that a new army, raised within the year, and undaunted by a series of recent disasters, had assailed a victorious enemy in his own quarters, and had only been repulsed after a sharp and dubious conflict.

John Fiske, in The American Revolution (1891), wrote:

...The genius and audacity shown by Washington, in thus planning and so nearly accomplishing the ruin of the British army only three weeks after the defeat at the Brandywine, produced a profound impression upon military critics in Europe. Frederick of Prussia saw that presently, when American soldiers should come to be disciplined veterans, they would become a very formidable instrument in the hands of their great commander; and the French court, in making up its mind that the Americans would prove efficient allies, is said to have been influenced almost as much by the battle of Germantown as by the surrender of Burgoyne.

Eight Army National Guard units (103rd Eng Bn, A/1-104th Cav, 109th FA, 111th Inf, 113th Inf, 116th Inf, 175th Inf and 198th Sig Bn) and one active Regular Army Field Artillery battalion (1-5th FA) are derived from American units that participated in the Battle of Germantown. There are only thirty currently existing units in the U.S. Army with lineages that go back to the colonial era.

== See also ==
- American Revolutionary War § British northern strategy fails. Places 'Battle of Germantown' in overall sequence and strategic context.
- Upsala
- Dawesfield
- Peter Wentz Homestead
- Wyck House
