= Cliveden (Benjamin Chew House) =

Historic house in Pennsylvania, United States

- U.S. National Register of Historic Places
- U.S. National Historic Landmark
- U.S. National Historic Landmark District – Contributing property
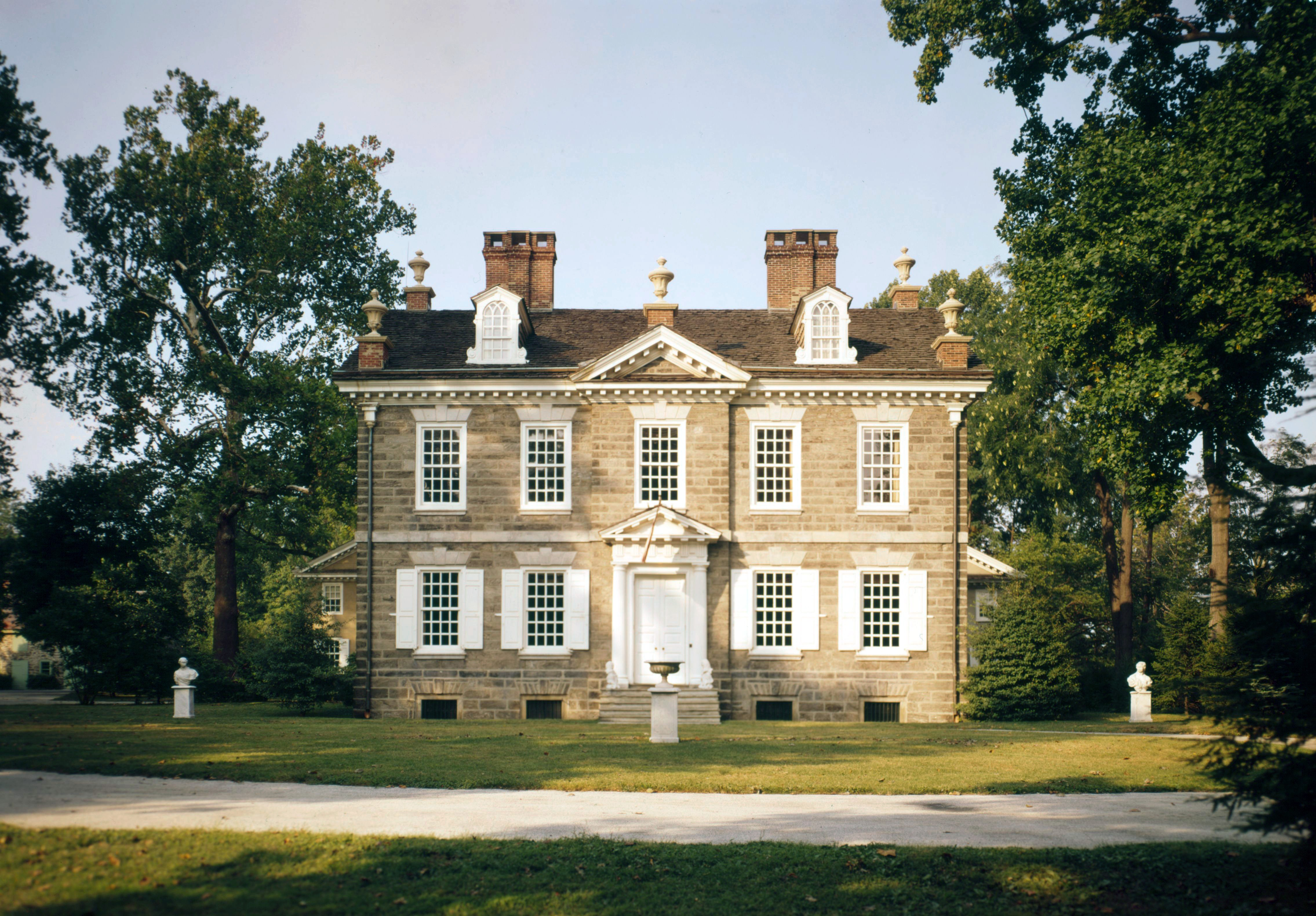
- Location: 6401 Germantown Avenue; Germantown, Philadelphia, Pennsylvania, U.S.
- Coordinates: 40°02′46″N 75°10′56″W
- Area: 5.4 acres (2.2 ha)
- Built: 1767
- Built by: Benjamin Chew
- Architect: Attributed to William Peters
- Architectural style: Georgian colonial
- Part of: Colonial Germantown Historic District (ID66000678)
- NRHP reference No.: 66000677

Significant dates
- Added to NRHP: October 15, 1966
- Designated NHL: January 20, 1961
- Designated NHLDCP: June 23, 1965

Cliveden (/ˈklɪvdən/ KLIV-dən), also known as the Benjamin Chew House or Chew House, is a historic mansion at 6401 Germantown Avenue in Germantown, Philadelphia, Pennsylvania. It was the scene of some of the bloodiest fighting of the Battle of Germantown, fought in 1777 during the American Revolutionary War.

== History ==
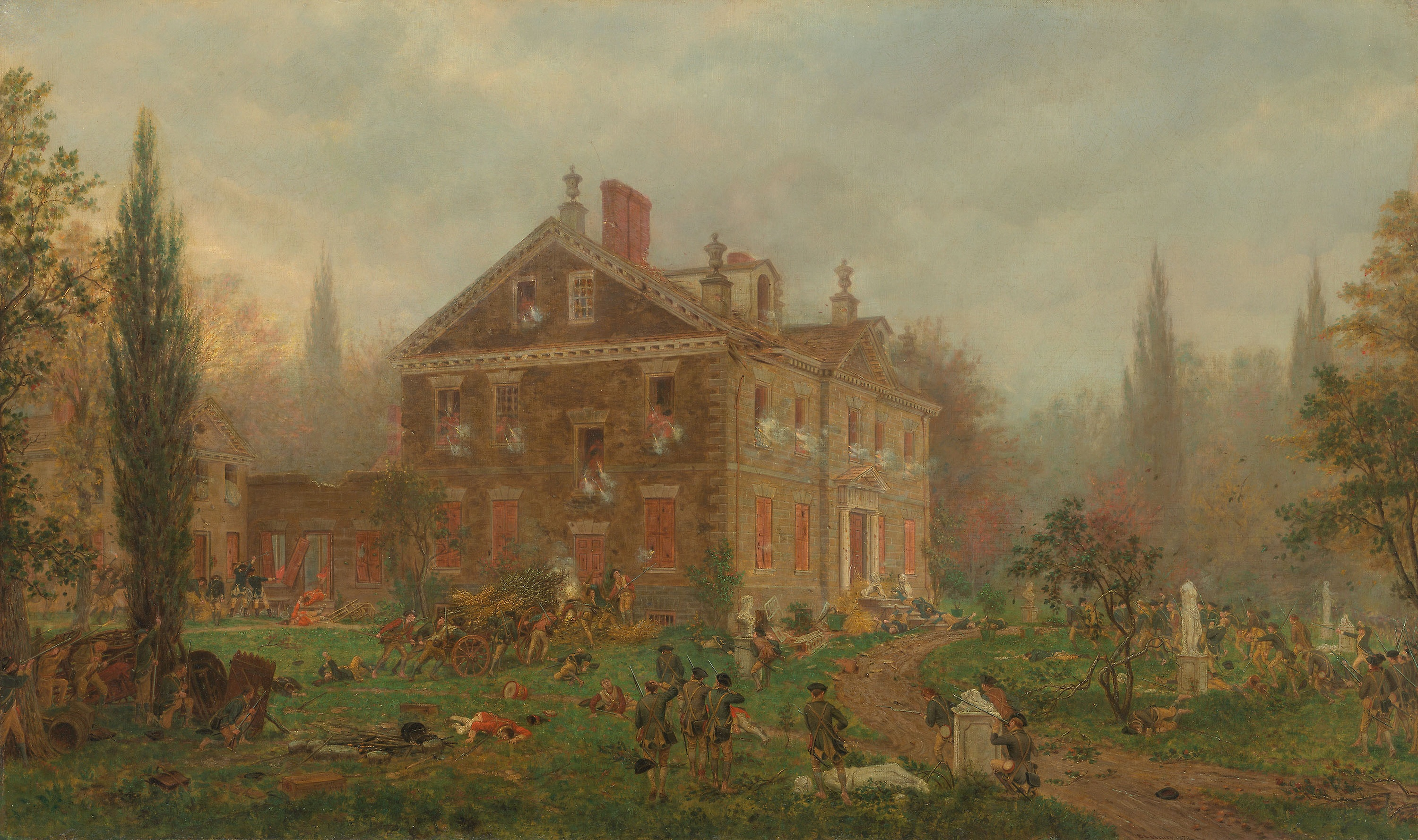
Cliveden during the Battle of Germantown

Built between 1763 and 1767 by Benjamin Chew, the mansion was inhabited from colonial times by seven generations of the Chew family, until 1972. Chew was head of the Pennsylvania Judiciary System under both Colony and Commonwealth, and Chief Justice of the Supreme Court of the Province of Pennsylvania. From his legal mentor, Andrew Hamilton, he inherited Hamilton's lifelong clients, the descendants of William Penn.

For Chew's safety, the Executive Committee of the Continental Congress forcibly removed him and his family from Cliveden, as his close friend, George Washington, was ordering the Continental Army to move towards Philadelphia. On October 4, 1777 the Battle of Germantown was fought around Cliveden. During the battle, 120 British troops of the 40th Foot under Lieutenant-colonel Thomas Musgrave occupied the mansion and defeated several American attempts to capture it, killing 57 Americans and wounding several dozen more. Washington's army was repelled and driven back down Germantown Avenue in defeat.

In 1961, Cliveden was designated a National Historic Landmark, and was listed on the National Register of Historic Places in 1966. It is part of the Colonial Germantown Historic District. The National Trust for Historic Preservation operates Cliveden as a historic house museum and offers tours from April through December. Significance:

Cliveden is an outstanding example of Philadelphia Georgian architecture. Probably designed by Chew and Jacob Knor, a master carpenter, the stone masonry house has particularly fine interior woodwork.

— Historic American Buildings Survey

== Property ==
The original estate included a number of other structures, including a stable and coach house, a smoke house, hen house, and summer house. The landscaping features statuary and gardens with over 200 varieties of trees and shrubs. In 1868, a two-story addition was added in the original courtyard. A window on the second-floor stair landing in the main house was converted into a hidden doorway to create an entrance to the addition.

The Chew Family Papers, containing an extensive collection of correspondence, documents, financial records and other materials, are available for research use at the Historical Society of Pennsylvania.

Architectural details

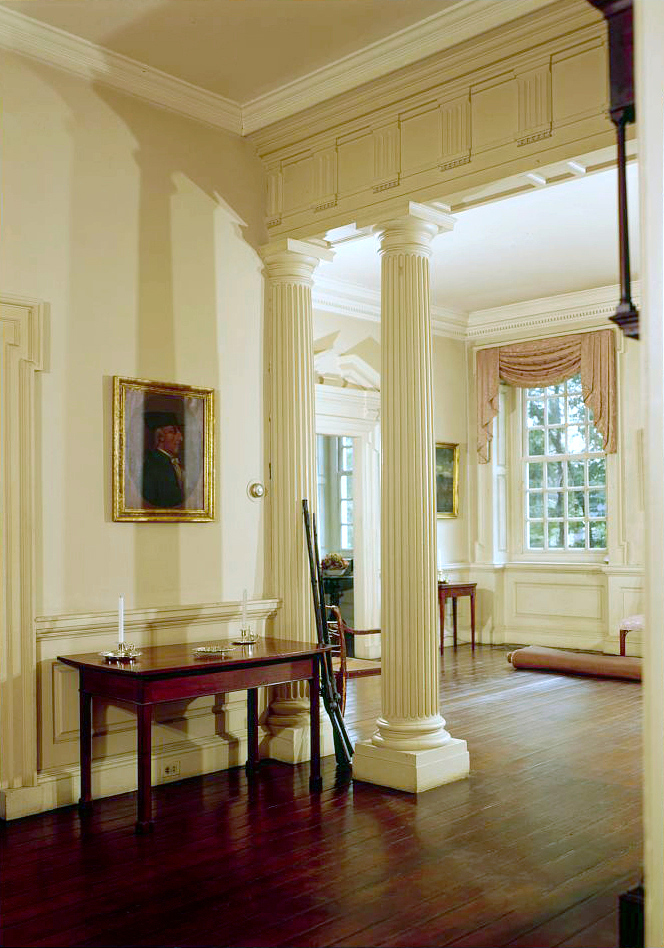
Colonnade in main hallway

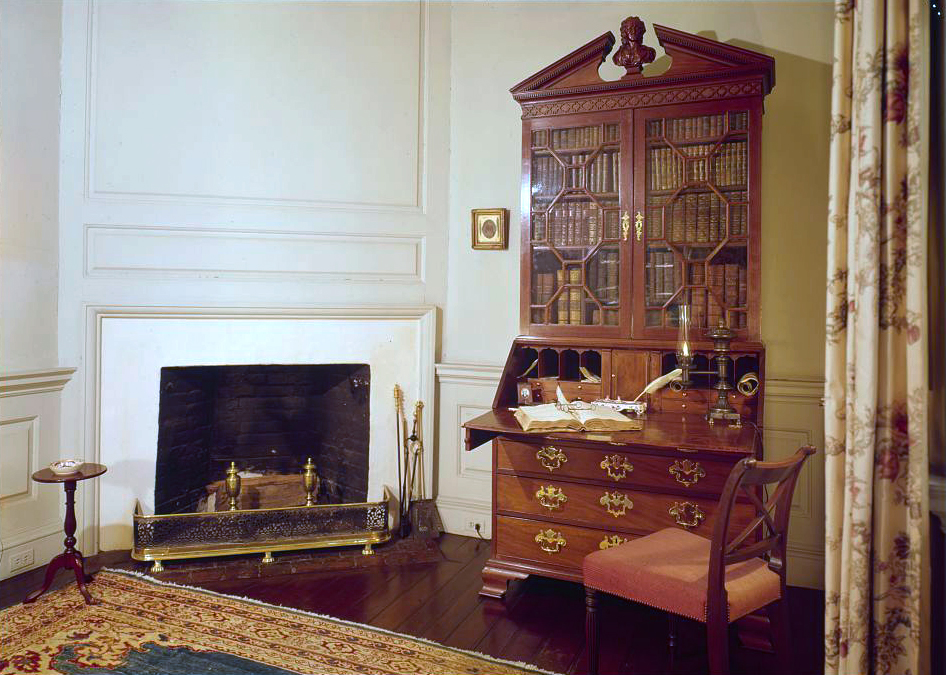
Southeast room

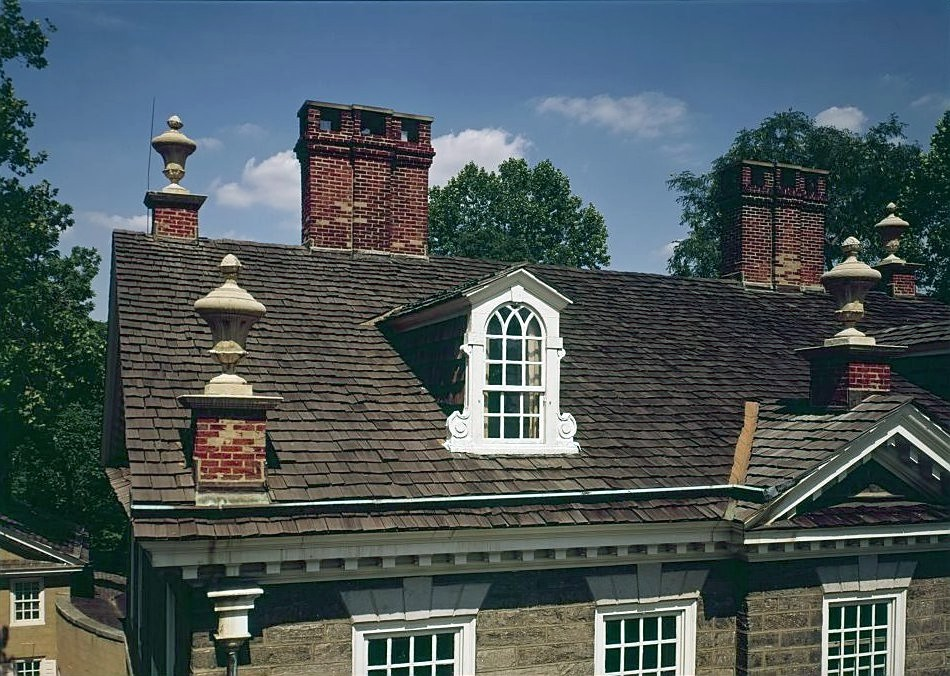
Urns, dormers and chimneys on the front roof

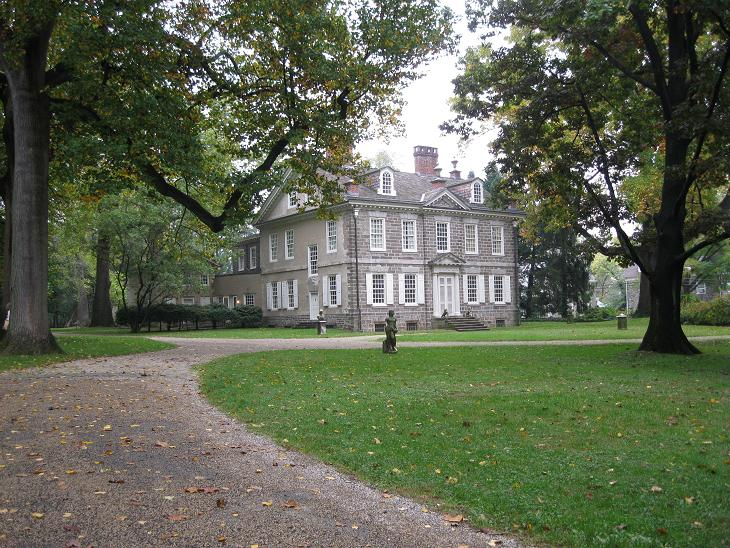
View from the driveway

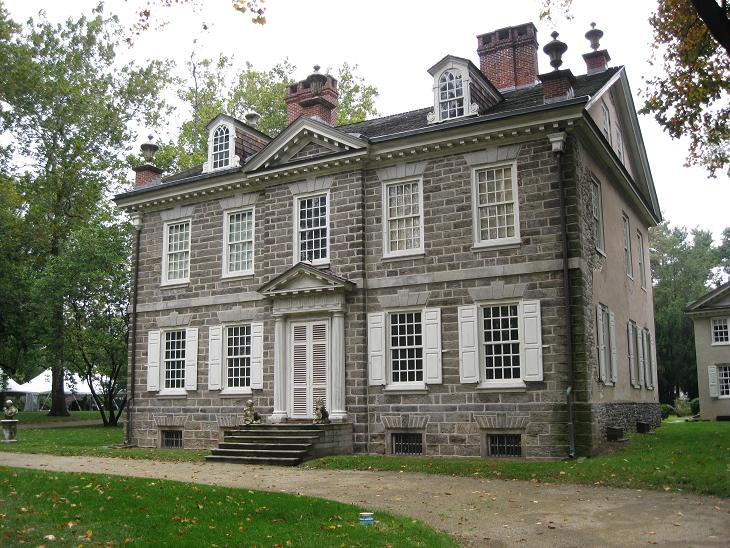
Right front of the house

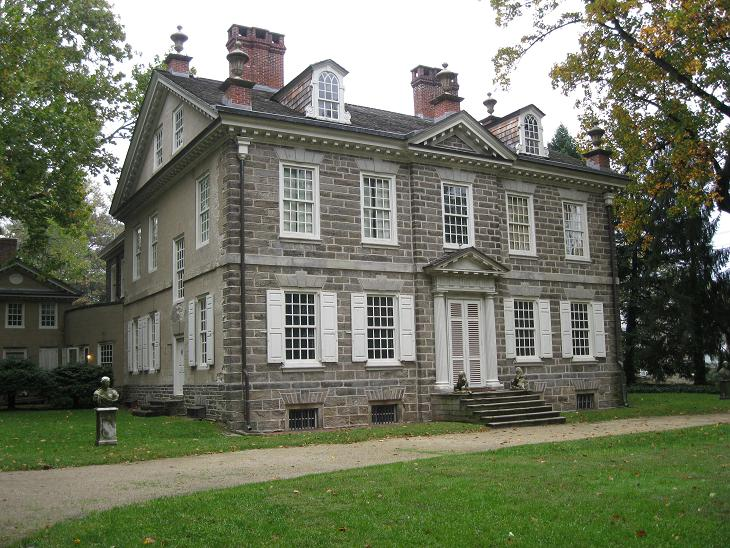
Left front on the house, showing servants' entrance at left

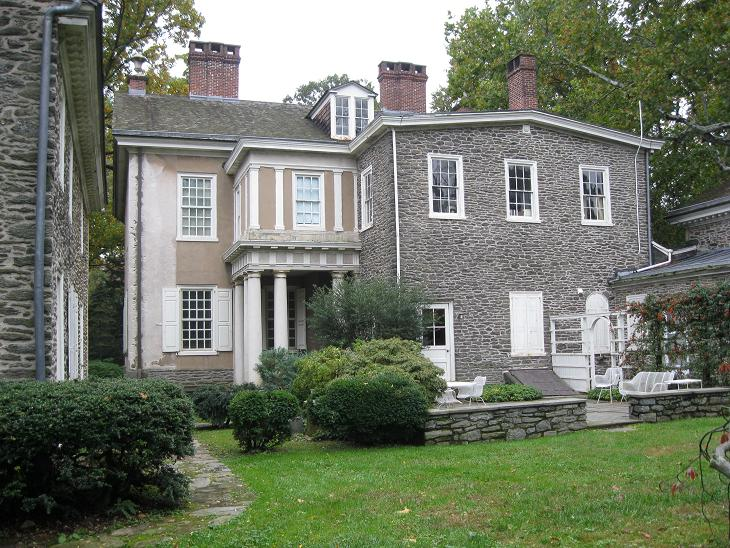
Rear entrance of the house

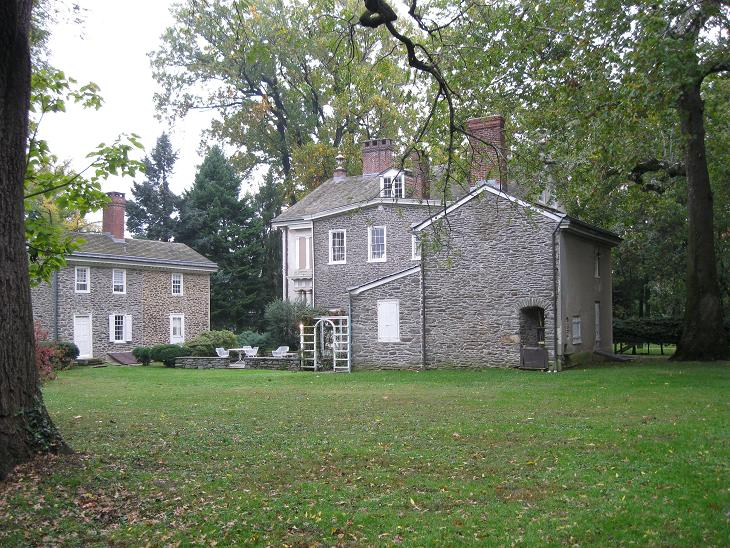
Rear of the house with outbuildings

== See also ==
- Wyck House
- John Johnson House
- List of National Historic Landmarks in Philadelphia
- National Register of Historic Places listings in Northwest Philadelphia
