= Samuel Chew (justice) =

American judge

Samuel Chew (b. October 30, 1693 – d. June 16, 1743) was a physician who served as chief justice of colonial Delaware.

== Life ==
Samuel was the third of a line of sons to bear the name. Samuel (III) was the son of Samuel Chew (II) who married Henrietta Maria Lloyd with later relation to William Paca. The first Samuel (I) "of Herrington" was the son of John Chew, a merchant and burgess who emigrated to Virginia c. 1622 aboard the barque, Charitie. His wife, Sarah, was a passenger on the ship Seaflower.

Samuel married Mary Galloway in 1715, and their son Benjamin Chew was later Chief Justice of Pennsylvania. His first wife died in 1734, and he married Mary Paca Galloway in 1736. Originally he lived on his family's estate of Maidstone in Anne Arundel County, Maryland. The manor house still stands although, since borders have changed, it is now in Calvert County, Maryland.

In 1738, he moved to build an estate known as Whitehall in Kent County, Delaware. Pennsylvania Governor John Penn appointed him Chief Justice of the lower counties (or Delaware) in 1741.

Chew was influential among the Quakers, but provoked criticism by an address to the grand jury of Newcastle on the lawfulness of resistance to an armed enemy (printed 1741, reprinted in 1775).

== Notes ==
Attribution
