= Gouverneur Cadwalader =

American sportsman and soldier

Maj. Gouverneur Cadwalader (February 3, 1880 – October 14, 1935) was an American sportsman and soldier.

== Early life ==
Cadwalader was born on February 3, 1880, in Springfield Township, Pennsylvania. He was a son of Richard McCall Cadwalader (1839–1918) and Christine W. (née Biddle) Cadwalader (1847–1900). Among his brothers were Thomas Cadwalader, Dr. William Biddle Cadwalader, Richard McCall Cadwalader Jr. (who married Emily Margaretta Roebling), (Note: Emily Roebling Cadwalader (1879–1941) was the granddaughter of John A. Roebling, who designed the Brooklyn Bridge.) Charles Meigs Biddle Cadwalader, and Alexander Cadwalader,

His maternal grandparents were Jonathan Williams Biddle and Emily Skinner (née Meigs) Biddle. His paternal grandparents were Thomas McCall Cadwalader and Maria Charlotte (née Gouverneur) Cadwalader. (Note: Cadwalader's grandmother, Maria Charlotte (née Gouverneur) Cadwalader (1801–1867), was a niece of Elizabeth Kortright, the wife of U.S. President James Monroe. Maria's brother, Samuel Laurence Gouverneur, married Maria Hester Monroe, President Monroe's daughter.) His uncle, John Lambert Cadwalader, was a prominent lawyer who served as the 10th U.S. Assistant Secretary of State. He was also a great-grandson of Col. Lambert Cadwalader, an officer in the American Revolution who represented New Jersey at the Continental Congress.

Cadwalader graduated from St. Paul's School before attending the University of Pennsylvania.

== Career ==
After graduating from the University of Pennsylvania, Cadwalader became associated with the engineering department of the Pennsylvania Railroad and was stationed in Western Pennsylvania. Later, he joined the Cresson-Morris Company, a firm of engineers, machinists and founders. When the War broke out, he was serving as secretary-treasurer of the company, but did not return to business after the war ended.

Following the beginning of World War I, Cadwalader and his brothers joined the service and was attached to the Watertown Arsenal (on the northern shore of the Charles River in Watertown, Massachusetts) as a Major in the Ordnance Corps.

== Personal life ==
Coat of Arms of Gouverneur Cadwalader

In 1921, Cadwalader was married to Mae Drexel (née Fell) Henry (1884–1948). The widow of Capt. Howard Houston Henry, (Note: From Mae's first marriage to Howard Houston Henry (a son of State Senator Bayard Henry), she had a daughter, Sarah Drexel Henry (1895–1969), who married James Emmet Gowen in 1925.) Mae was a daughter of John Ruckman Fell and Sarah Rozet (née Drexel) Van Rensselaer. After Mae's father died, her mother Sarah (a daughter of banker Anthony Joseph Drexel) married Alexander Van Rensselaer. Together, they were the parents of:

- Mae Gouverneur (1923–2000), who married Rufus Lenoir Patterson III, a son of Morehead Patterson and grandson of Rufus L. Patterson Jr. and U.S. Representative Herbert Parsons, in 1942. After his death in 1944, she married Joseph Harrison Worrall in 1945. After his death in 1979, she married William Marshall Hollenback, son of Bill Hollenback, in 1987.
- Gouverneur Cadwalader Jr. (1924–2006), who married Catherine Schuyler Chambers, a daughter of Francis Taylor Chambers, in 1948. He later married Joan Hayden.
- Amanda "Minnie" Cassatt Gouverneur (1926–1996), who married William Hepburn Dixon, a son of Morris Hacker Dixon, in 1949. David Crawford Burton.

He was a member of the First Troop Philadelphia City Cavalry, the Pennsylvania Club, and belonged to the Racquet and Whitemarsh Valley Hunt Clubs. Cadwalader was interested in dogs and horses and served as president of the Kennel Club of Philadelphia.

Cadwalader died of heart disease at Hawkswell, his home at Camp Hill near Fort Washington (today part of Whitemarsh Township, Pennsylvania), on October 14, 1935. His widow died on August 31, 1948, at her summer home at Dark Harbor, Maine.

=== Descendants ===
Cadwalader family tree

John Cadwalader (1677–1734)	Martha Jones (1679–1747)
Thomas Cadwalader (1708–1779)	Hannah Lambert
Elizabeth Lloyd (1742–1776)	John Cadwalader (1742–1786)	Williamina Bond (1753–1837)	Lambert Cadwalader (1742–1823)	Mary McCall (1764–1848)
Archibald McCall (1767–1843)	Elizabeth Cadwalader (1774–1824)	Maria Cadwalader (1776–1811)	Samuel Ringgold (1770–1829)	Thomas Cadwalader (1779–1841)	Thomas McCall Cadwalader (1795–1873)	Maria Charlotte Gouverneur (1801–1867)
George Archibald McCall (1802–1868)	Samuel Ringgold (1796–1846)	Cadwalader Ringgold (1802–1867)	John Cadwalader (1805–1879)	George Cadwalader (1806–1879)	John Lambert Cadwalader (1836–1914)
Mary Binney Cadwalader (1829–1861)	William Henry Rawle (1823–1889)	Emily Cadwalader (1834–1892)
Frederic Rhinelander Jones (1846–1918)	Mary Cadwalader Rawle (1850–1923)
Beatrix Cadwalader Jones (1872–1959)	Max Farrand (1869–1945)

Notes:
- "Cadwalader Family Papers" (PDF). Collection 1454. Historical Society of Pennsylvania. 2007.
