= Cadwalader Ringgold =

United States Navy admiral (1802–1867)

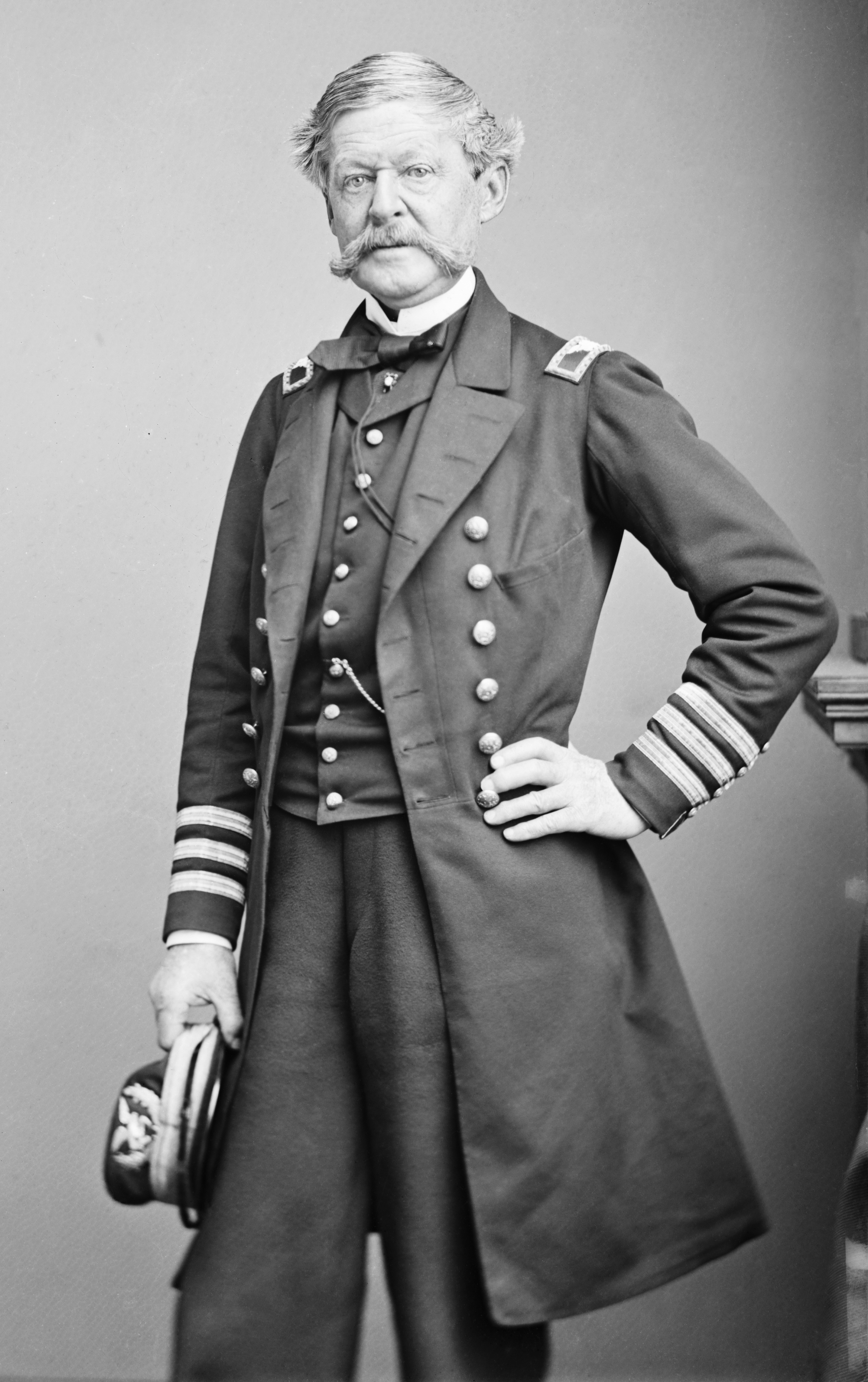
- Born: August 20, 1802; Washington County, Maryland
- Died: April 29, 1867 (aged 64); New York City
- Burial place: Green Mount Cemetery, Baltimore
- Military career
- Allegiance: United States of America
- Branch: United States Navy
- Service years: 1819–1864
- Rank: Rear admiral
- Commands: USS Weasel; USS Porpoise; USS Sabine
- Conflicts: American Civil War

Cadwalader Ringgold (August 20, 1802 – April 29, 1867) was an officer in the United States Navy who served in the United States Exploring Expedition, later headed an expedition to the Northwest and, after initially retiring, returned to service during the Civil War.

== Life and early career ==
Cadwalader Ringgold was born August 20, 1802, in Washington County, Maryland, at Fountain Rock, the 18,000-acre (7,300 ha) family estate. His mother was Maria Cadwalader (1776–1811), daughter of John Cadwalader (1742–1786), who was a general during the American Revolutionary War. Some sources spell his first name with two "l"s. His father was Samuel Ringgold, a Maryland politician who later served in the U.S. House of Representatives. He had an older brother, Samuel Ringgold, an army officer called "the father of modern artillery" and who died in the Battle of Palo Alto. Cadwalader was the sixth of 11 children, the youngest child of his mother, who then died. His father remarried and had five more children by his second wife.

Ringgold entered the U.S. Navy in 1819 and commanded the schooner USS Weasel in action against West Indies pirates during the late 1820s. He became a lieutenant on May 17, 1828, and that year served on Vandalia in the Pacific Ocean. He served on the Adams in the Mediterranean.

== United States Exploring Expedition ==
During 1838–42, he was third in command of the United States Exploring Expedition in the Pacific, commanding Porpoise from 1840 at the invitation of the head of the project, Charles Wilkes. He carried out surveys of Antarctica, the South American coast, the Tuamotu Islands, Tonga, New Zealand and the Northwest Pacific coast of North America.

When the expedition visited Fiji, they captured Vendoni, a chief on the islands who had inspired some Fijians to capture and eat 11 crewmen on a ship seven years before. Soon afterward, Fijians on the island of Malolo ambushed and killed two popular officers of the expedition, and the Americans took revenge. Wilkes's ship grounded on the north side of the island, but Ringgold led 80 men from the south side. Women and children were spared, but about 87 Fijians were killed before the rest surrendered. Two villages were destroyed.

The expedition visited California that summer. On August 19, 1841, Ringgold led a 60-man party exploring San Francisco Bay watershed for 20 days. The party got about as far as Colusa, California. Ringgold, who returned to New York shortly after the rest of the expedition, had been gone three years and 11 months at sea. He and his crew had sailed 95,000 miles (153,000 km) and lost only two men.

== Other expeditions ==
Ringgold was promoted to commander on July 16, 1849, and began the definitive survey of the San Francisco Bay region, suddenly important because of the discovery of gold in the area. The survey began in August 1849, with Ringgold commanding the chartered brig Col. Fremont.

After the California surveys, Ringgold helped Navy officials choose a location for a dockyard for the Navy's Pacific station. It later became the Mare Island Navy Yard. He published A Series of Charts with Sailing Directions in 1851. Together with Commodore Matthew Perry and others, Ringgold served in August 1852 on the Board of Examination for midshipmen of the U.S. Naval Academy at Annapolis.

It may have been around this time that Ringgold acquired a bust of Whig politician Henry Clay, presumably out of admiration.

In 1853 he took command of the five ships in the North Pacific Exploring and Surveying Expedition, also known as the "Rodgers-Ringgold Expedition", with the Vincennes as his flagship, but while on the expedition, in July 1854, he contracted malaria and was sent home, according to at least one source. Nathaniel Philbrick, in his book Sea of Glory about the U.S. Exploring Expedition, writes that in the later expedition Ringgold "began to act strangely" once in China, keeping his ships in port and "ceaselessly repairing his vessels". Commodore Perry, on his own expedition, sailed in and convened an official panel which relieved Ringgold from command of the expedition and sent him home. Philbrick quotes Perry as declaring Ringgold "insane." John Rodgers was given full command of the expedition and completed it.

A board of naval doctors convened by Perry declared Ringgold unfit for active service, and he was put on the reserve list on September 13, 1855. Ringgold recovered within weeks, and soon petitioned Congress for his return. Unsuccessful there, he appealed to a Court of Inquiry, and eventually succeeded in returning to the active list on January 23, 1858, (retroactive to April 2, 1856), a campaign of more than two years.

For the next several years, he was in Washington, D.C., working on the North Pacific Exploring and Surveying Expedition charts, some of which were used by the US Navy in World War II (charts from the United States Exploring Expedition were also used in that war).

== Civil War and after ==
Ringgold returned to the fleet with the rank of captain during the Civil War. While in command of the frigate Sabine on November 1, 1861, he effected the rescue of a battalion of 400 Marines from Maryland whose transport steamer, Governor, was sinking during a severe storm near Port Royal, South Carolina.

In February 1862, he was a part of the search and rescue of the ship of the line Vermont which had lost her rudder in a storm. For these rescues, Ringgold received commendations from the Maryland Legislature and the U.S. Congress, along with a gold medal from the Life Saving Benevolent Association.

Promoted to commodore on July 16, 1862, he was sent (still on the Sabine), to cruise the Azores, Cape Verde Islands, the coast of Brazil and then back to New York in a fruitless search for the Confederate raider CSS Alabama from November 1862 to February 1863. In mid-1863, Ringgold's assignment was to search (again unsuccessfully) in the vicinity of Bermuda and then the New England coast for the bark CSS Tacony, another Confederate raider.

For reasons of age, he was retired on August 20, 1864, and placed on the rear admiral (retired) list in 1866 (a promotion that was given to all commanders of squadrons). In retirement, he lived at 18 East Eighteenth Street (at Union Square) in New York City. Ringgold, who had never married, died of apoplexy (stroke) in New York on April 29, 1867.

Days later, as the Marine band played the "Dead March" from Saul, 400 Marines and carriages in the funeral cortege proceeded from Ringgold's residence down Broadway to Trinity Church. In attendance were Admirals Farragut, Bell, and Stringham, along with a number of generals. Ringgold's remains were taken by train to Green Mount Cemetery in Baltimore, where he lies next to the grave of his brother, Major Samuel Ringgold.

== Namesakes ==
Two ships have been named in his honor: USS Ringgold (DD-89) and USS Ringgold (DD-500).

Ringgold Street in San Francisco, California is named after him. However, the street in question is spelled as 'Ringold'.

Another namesake was the writer Ring Lardner. Rear Admiral James Lawrence Lardner was a friend of Ringgold's. He named a son "Ringgold Wilmer Lardner", and James' brother gave exactly the same name to his son after the newborn's cousin. Ring Lardner disliked his name and shortened it but "lost the battle" when his son, Ring Lardner Jr. was named after him.

Charles Wilkes the commander of the United States Exploring Expedition named the Ringgold Isles of Fiji after him in 1840.

== Family tree ==
Cadwalader family tree

John Cadwalader (1677–1734)	Martha Jones (1679–1747)
Thomas Cadwalader (1708–1779)	Hannah Lambert
Elizabeth Lloyd (1742–1776)	John Cadwalader (1742–1786)	Williamina Bond (1753–1837)	Lambert Cadwalader (1742–1823)	Mary McCall (1764–1848)
Archibald McCall (1767–1843)	Elizabeth Cadwalader (1774–1824)	Maria Cadwalader (1776–1811)	Samuel Ringgold (1770–1829)	Thomas Cadwalader (1779–1841)	Thomas McCall Cadwalader (1795–1873)	Maria Charlotte Gouverneur (1801–1867)
George Archibald McCall (1802–1868)	Samuel Ringgold (1796–1846)	Cadwalader Ringgold (1802–1867)	John Cadwalader (1805–1879)	George Cadwalader (1806–1879)	John Lambert Cadwalader (1836–1914)
Mary Binney Cadwalader (1829–1861)	William Henry Rawle (1823–1889)	Emily Cadwalader (1834–1892)
Frederic Rhinelander Jones (1846–1918)	Mary Cadwalader Rawle (1850–1923)
Beatrix Cadwalader Jones (1872–1959)	Max Farrand (1869–1945)

Notes:
- "Cadwalader Family Papers" (PDF). Collection 1454. Historical Society of Pennsylvania. 2007.
