= George A. McCall =

American military officer (1802–1868)

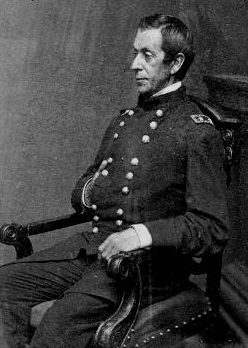
- McCall, c. 1862
- Born: George Archibald McCall; March 16, 1802; Philadelphia, Pennsylvania, U.S.
- Died: February 25, 1868 (aged 65); West Chester, Pennsylvania, U.S.
- Burial place: Christ Church Burial Ground; Philadelphia, Pennsylvania
- Military career
- Allegiance: United States of America
- Branch: United States Army; United States Volunteers; Pennsylvania Reserves
- Service years: 1818–1853, 1861–1863
- Rank: Colonel; Brigadier General (Volunteers)
- Commands: Pennsylvania Reserves
- Conflicts: Second Seminole War; Mexican-American War; Battle of Palo Alto; Battle of Resaca de la Palma; Siege of Veracruz; American Civil War; Battle of Beaver Dam Creek; Battle of Gaines Mill; Battle of Glendale

George Archibald McCall (March 16, 1802 – February 25, 1868) was a United States Army officer who became a brigadier general and prisoner of war during the American Civil War. He was also a naturalist.

== Biography ==
McCall was born in Philadelphia, Pennsylvania, to Archibald McCall (1767–1843), a descendant of the Schuyler family and the Van Cortlandt family through his ancestors Stephanus Van Cortlandt and Gertrude Schuyler, and Elizabeth Cadwalader.

He was appointed from Pennsylvania to the United States Military Academy at West Point, graduating in 1822, 26th in his class of 40. His service took him to Florida, especially the Pensacola area. He enjoyed his time in Pensacola, writing frequently of his life there as a 2nd Lieutenant. He was promoted to 1st Lieutenant after seven years and, in 1846, to the rank of captain. He was assigned to the 1st U.S. Infantry then the 4th U.S. Infantry before serving as aide-de-camp to Gen. Edmund P. Gaines into the beginning of the Second Seminole War. He distinguished himself during the Mexican–American War under Zachary Taylor, receiving brevet promotions to major for gallantry at Palo Alto and to lieutenant colonel for Resaca de la Palma. Appreciative leading Philadelphians presented him a sword upon his return to the city in 1847. On August 30, 1851, at the age of 49, he was married to Elizabeth McMurtrie. The marriage was a happy one, and at least two sons and one daughter were born to the couple. He retired with 31 years service as colonel and Inspector General of the Army in 1853.

He was elected as a member of the American Philosophical Society in 1854.

At the beginning of the Civil War, McCall helped organize Pennsylvania volunteers as major general of the state militia and was commissioned brigadier general of volunteers in May 1861. He helped organize and led the famous Pennsylvania Reserves Division, which served as the 2nd Division, I Corps, Army of the Potomac, and 3rd Division, V Corps. He was one of the oldest West Point graduates to serve in the war.

McCall served in the Peninsula Campaign and was wounded and captured at Frayser's Farm, Virginia, in June 1862. While trying to ascertain his position without his staff officers, he instead met the 47th Virginia, part of General James Longstreet's command. Longstreet had served as a brevet Second Lieutenant under Mccall in the 4th U.S. Infantry. He was imprisoned in Libby Prison in Richmond, Virginia. Previous illness was aggravated by his confinement in prison, and after his exchange (for Simon Bolivar Buckner) in August, McCall resigned due to poor health in March 1863.

In retirement, McCall farmed in Pennsylvania. He died at his "Belair" estate in West Chester, Pennsylvania, on February 25, 1868, and is buried in the Christ Church Burial Ground in his native Philadelphia.

McCall School in Society Hill, Center City, Philadelphia is named after him.

McCall is commemorated in the scientific name of a species of lizard, Phrynosoma mcallii.

== Dates of rank ==
=== United States Army ===
Date	Insignia	Rank	Brevet Promotions
September 1, 1818		Cadet	
July 1, 1822		Second Lieutenant	
January 25, 1829		First Lieutenant	
September 21, 1836		Captain	Bvt. Major (1846) (Note: May 9, 1846, for gallantry and meritorious conduct at the battles of Palo Alto and Resaca de la Palma; also from July 7, 1846, while assigned as assistant adjutant general (permanent rank received on December 26, 1847).); Bvt. Lieutenant Colonel (1846) (Note: May 9, 1846, for gallantry and meritorious conduct at the battles of Palo Alto and Resaca de la Palma.)
December 26, 1847		Major	
June 10, 1850		Colonel	
April 29, 1853	Resigned commission.		

=== Pennsylvania Reserves ===
Date	Insignia	Rank	Brevet Promotions
May 15, 1861		Major General	
July 23, 1861	Converted to federal service.		

=== United States Volunteers ===
Date	Insignia	Rank	Brevet Promotions
May 17, 1861		Brigadier General	
March 31, 1863	Resigned commission.		

== Family tree ==
Cadwalader family tree

John Cadwalader (1677–1734)	Martha Jones (1679–1747)
Thomas Cadwalader (1708–1779)	Hannah Lambert
Elizabeth Lloyd (1742–1776)	John Cadwalader (1742–1786)	Williamina Bond (1753–1837)	Lambert Cadwalader (1742–1823)	Mary McCall (1764–1848)
Archibald McCall (1767–1843)	Elizabeth Cadwalader (1774–1824)	Maria Cadwalader (1776–1811)	Samuel Ringgold (1770–1829)	Thomas Cadwalader (1779–1841)	Thomas McCall Cadwalader (1795–1873)	Maria Charlotte Gouverneur (1801–1867)
George Archibald McCall (1802–1868)	Samuel Ringgold (1796–1846)	Cadwalader Ringgold (1802–1867)	John Cadwalader (1805–1879)	George Cadwalader (1806–1879)	John Lambert Cadwalader (1836–1914)
Mary Binney Cadwalader (1829–1861)	William Henry Rawle (1823–1889)	Emily Cadwalader (1834–1892)
Frederic Rhinelander Jones (1846–1918)	Mary Cadwalader Rawle (1850–1923)
Beatrix Cadwalader Jones (1872–1959)	Max Farrand (1869–1945)

Notes:
- "Cadwalader Family Papers" (PDF). Collection 1454. Historical Society of Pennsylvania. 2007.

== See also ==
- List of American Civil War generals (Union)
