= Max Farrand =

American historian

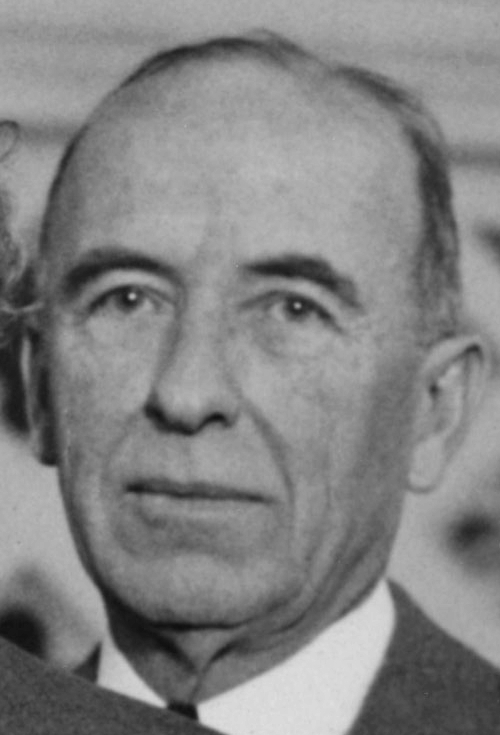
- Farrand in 1931

1st Director of the Huntington Library
- In office October 1, 1927 – June 30, 1941
- Succeeded by: Wallace Sterling

Personal details
- Born: March 29, 1869 Newark, New Jersey
- Died: June 17, 1945 (aged 76) Bar Harbor, Maine
- Spouse: Beatrix Jones (m. 1913)
- Relatives: Livingston Farrand (brother)
- Education: Princeton University
- Occupation: Historian
- Known for: First director of the Huntington Library

Max Farrand (March 29, 1869 – June 17, 1945) was an American historian and university professor. Farrand served as the first director of the Huntington Library.

== Early life ==
He was born in Newark, New Jersey, United States. He graduated from Princeton with a Bachelors of Arts in 1892 and a PhD in 1896.

== Career ==
From 1908 to 1925, he was a professor of history at Yale University. Prior to his position at Yale, Farrand also taught at Wesleyan University, Stanford University, and Cornell University. Farrand's area of expertise was constitutional history. Farrand served as director of the Commonwealth Fund, founded in 1918 by Anna M. Harkness.

Farrand assisted Henry E. Huntington in establishing the Huntington Library, located on the historic Rancho Huerta de Cuati' in San Marino, California. Following Huntington's death in 1927, Farrand became the library's first director, serving until 1941.

In 1921, Farrand was elected to the American Academy of Arts and Sciences. He was elected in 1926 a Fellow of the American Association for the Advancement of Science (AAAS). He was elected to the American Philosophical Society in 1928.

In 1940, Farrand, as President of the American Historical Society delivered an address describing his views on history.

Farrand's final work, an examination of the letters of Benjamin Franklin, was published posthumously in 1949.

== Family ==
In 1913, Farrand married the landscape architect Beatrix Farrand. They remodeled her family's home, Reef Point Estate in Bar Harbor, Maine, where they spent their summers. They had no children. Farrand's brother was the researcher Livingston Farrand.

Cadwalader family tree

John Cadwalader (1677–1734)	Martha Jones (1679–1747)
Thomas Cadwalader (1708–1779)	Hannah Lambert
Elizabeth Lloyd (1742–1776)	John Cadwalader (1742–1786)	Williamina Bond (1753–1837)	Lambert Cadwalader (1742–1823)	Mary McCall (1764–1848)
Archibald McCall (1767–1843)	Elizabeth Cadwalader (1774–1824)	Maria Cadwalader (1776–1811)	Samuel Ringgold (1770–1829)	Thomas Cadwalader (1779–1841)	Thomas McCall Cadwalader (1795–1873)	Maria Charlotte Gouverneur (1801–1867)
George Archibald McCall (1802–1868)	Samuel Ringgold (1796–1846)	Cadwalader Ringgold (1802–1867)	John Cadwalader (1805–1879)	George Cadwalader (1806–1879)	John Lambert Cadwalader (1836–1914)
Mary Binney Cadwalader (1829–1861)	William Henry Rawle (1823–1889)	Emily Cadwalader (1834–1892)
Frederic Rhinelander Jones (1846–1918)	Mary Cadwalader Rawle (1850–1923)
Beatrix Cadwalader Jones (1872–1959)	Max Farrand (1869–1945)

Notes:
- "Cadwalader Family Papers" (PDF). Collection 1454. Historical Society of Pennsylvania. 2007.

== Death and legacy ==
The Farrands retired to Reef Point estate in Bar Harbor, which they planned to establish as an independent and self-perpetuating educational corporation. Max Farrand died in 1945 before this could be accomplished. After a wildfire destroyed part of the property in 1955, Beatrix demolished the main house and uprooted the garden. She also donated their extensive library and herbarium specimens to the University of California at Berkeley. John D. Rockefeller purchasing the azaleas from the uprooted gardens for his own Asticou Azalea Garden in Northeast Harbor, Maine.

The Farrands are both buried at Woodlawn Cemetery in New York City.

During the Bicentennial Celebrations, James Hutson, head of the Manuscripts Division of the Library of Congress, edited a revised edition of Farrand's four volume, The Records of the Federal Convention of 1787 (Yale University Press, 1976).

== Publications ==
- Legislation of Congress for the Government of the Organized Territories of the United States, 1789–1895 (1896) [PhD dissertation]
- Translation of Jellinek's Declaration of the Rights of Man and of Citizens (Translation from German to English) (1901)
- Records of Federal Convention of 1787 (three volumes, 1911, 1921, and 1921; vol. IV, published in 1937, remains under copyright; also reprinted in 1923, 1927 and 1934)
- The Framing of the Constitution of the United States (1913)
- Development of the United States (1918)
- The Fathers of the Constitution (1921)
- The Founders Of The Union (1926)

== General and cited references ==
- New General Catalog of Old Books and Authors

Academic offices
New post	1st Director of Huntington Library; 1927 – 1941	Succeeded by Wallace Sterling
