= Samuel Ringgold (politician) =

American politician (1770–1829)

- Born: January 15, 1770; Chestertown, Maryland
- Died: October 18, 1829 (aged 59); Frederick, Maryland
- Occupations: Politician, soldier
- Political party: Democratic-Republican
- Children: 11, including Samuel Ringgold (United States Army officer) and Cadwalader Ringgold
- Parent(s): Thomas Ringgold V and Mary Galloway Ringgold
- Relatives: Thomas Ringgold (grandfather); Samuel Galloway III (grandfather); Tench Ringgold (brother)

Samuel Ringgold (January 15, 1770 – October 18, 1829), a Democratic-Republican, he served in the U.S. House of Representatives from 1810 to 1821 with the exception of one two-year absence, was a brigadier general in the Maryland militia during the War of 1812 and father of two sons with distinguished military careers, Samuel and Cadwalader.

== Early life and career ==
Samuel Ringgold was born in Chestertown, Maryland, the second son of Thomas Ringgold V, a merchant, revolutionary and slave trader and Mary Galloway Ringgold. Ringgold's father died young. After his father's death, Ringgold's mother relocated her children, Thomas Ringgold VI, Samuel, Benjamin, Tench and Anna Maria to Washington County, Maryland, where her family owned considerable landholdings that would later become the Fountain Rock plantation.

=== Plantation and political life ===
In contrast to his forebears, who were known as merchants and long time denizens of Maryland's Eastern Shore, Samuel Ringgold grew up in a landed, agrarian setting in Maryland's interior, outside of Hagerstown, Maryland. At Fountain Rock, the family grew corn and wheat, eventually becoming one of the largest slave holding plantations in all of Maryland.

As a young man, Samuel would serve on the vestry of the local Saint John's Church. By the time he was 25 he was elected to the Maryland House of Delegates (1795) and later served in the Maryland State Senate (1801–1806). Later, he became a member of the U.S. House of Representatives, representing the fourth district of Maryland from October 15, 1810, to March 3, 1815; he previously ran for this seat while a state delegate in 1796. Ringgold's military career included serving during the War of 1812, and serving as a brigadier general in the Maryland militia. He was again elected to the House of Representatives and served from March 4, 1817 to March 3, 1821.

After leaving Congress, Ringgold returned to his estate, Fountain Rock, which hosted the Chapel in the Woods and now is the site of Saint James School. Founded in 1842, today Saint James is one of the oldest Episcopal boarding schools in the United States.

== Personal and family life ==
Ringgold married his first wife Maria on May 3, 1792 in Philadelphia. Maria, was the daughter of Gen. John Cadwalader, who served in the Continental Army in the Revolutionary War. She died in 1811. Two years later, Samuel Ringgold married Marie Antoinette Hay, a granddaughter of James Monroe at the White House. She would become the mother to five of Ringgold's 11 children. Marie Antoinette Hay was the daughter of George Hay, U.S Attorney for the District of Virginia, who represented the Government in prosecuting Aaron Burr for treason. George Hay's second wife was Eliza Kortright Monroe, a daughter of President Monroe, and was step-mother to Marie Antoinette Hay. After Samuel Ringgold's death Marie married a Robert Mackey Tidball.

Samuel Ringgold died in Frederick, Maryland, and is buried in Fountain Rock Cemetery, near Hagerstown, Maryland.

=== Children and legacy ===
Ringgold had three sons who served in the military and a daughter who married an army general. The most distinguished of his sons, Samuel (1796–1846) was an officer in the U.S. Army during the Mexican-American War. Also distinguished was Cadwalader Ringgold (1802–1867), a naval officer who served in the United States Exploring Expedition in command of The Porpoise and later headed another expedition to the Pacific Northwest. He saw service in the Civil War before retiring as a rear admiral.

The stepson, George Hay Ringgold (1814–1864) was graduated at the United States Military Academy in 1833, later left the Army to become a farmer but rejoined in 1846. He was in charge of the paymasters of the Department of the Pacific from 1861 till his death in San Francisco, California. George Hay Ringgold was buried at Calvary Cemetery, now part of Cypress Lawn in San Mateo County, California. He was an accomplished scholar, draughtsman, and painter.

A daughter, the "beautiful and accomplished" Marie Antoinette Ringgold (daughter of the second wife and named after her), married the prominent Gen. Henry Morris Naglee in San Francisco on May 26, 1865, after her brother's death.

== Family tree ==
Cadwalader family tree

John Cadwalader (1677–1734)	Martha Jones (1679–1747)
Thomas Cadwalader (1708–1779)	Hannah Lambert
Elizabeth Lloyd (1742–1776)	John Cadwalader (1742–1786)	Williamina Bond (1753–1837)	Lambert Cadwalader (1742–1823)	Mary McCall (1764–1848)
Archibald McCall (1767–1843)	Elizabeth Cadwalader (1774–1824)	Maria Cadwalader (1776–1811)	Samuel Ringgold (1770–1829)	Thomas Cadwalader (1779–1841)	Thomas McCall Cadwalader (1795–1873)	Maria Charlotte Gouverneur (1801–1867)
George Archibald McCall (1802–1868)	Samuel Ringgold (1796–1846)	Cadwalader Ringgold (1802–1867)	John Cadwalader (1805–1879)	George Cadwalader (1806–1879)	John Lambert Cadwalader (1836–1914)
Mary Binney Cadwalader (1829–1861)	William Henry Rawle (1823–1889)	Emily Cadwalader (1834–1892)
Frederic Rhinelander Jones (1846–1918)	Mary Cadwalader Rawle (1850–1923)
Beatrix Cadwalader Jones (1872–1959)	Max Farrand (1869–1945)

Notes:
- "Cadwalader Family Papers" (PDF). Collection 1454. Historical Society of Pennsylvania. 2007.

U.S. House of Representatives
Preceded by Roger Nelson	Representative of the Fourth Congressional District of Maryland; 1810–1815	Succeeded by George Baer, Jr.
Preceded by George Baer, Jr.	Representative of the Fourth Congressional District of Maryland; 1817–1821	Succeeded by John Nelson
