= Samuel Ringgold (United States Army officer) =

American Army artillery officer

- Samuel Ringgold by John Vanderlyn, c. 1825
- Born: 1796; Maryland
- Died: May 11, 1846 (aged 49–50); Port Isabel, Texas
- Burial place: Green Mount Cemetery, Baltimore
- Relatives: Samuel Ringgold (Father); Cadwallader Ringgold (Brother)
- Military career
- Allegiance: United States
- Branch: United States Army; Field Artillery
- Service years: 1818–1846
- Rank: Major
- Unit: 3rd Artillery Regiment
- Conflicts: Mexican–American War: Battle of Palo Alto †

Samuel B. Ringgold (1796 – May 11, 1846) was an artillery officer in the United States Army who was noted for several military innovations which caused him to be called the "Father of Modern Artillery." He was also, according to some records, the first U.S. officer to fall in the Mexican–American War, perishing from wounds received at the Battle of Palo Alto.

== Early life and career ==
Ringgold was the son of Samuel Ringgold, a U.S. Congressman from Maryland. A younger brother, Cadwalader Ringgold, served in the navy, becoming a rear admiral.

On July 24, 1818, Samuel Ringgold graduated 5th in a class of 23 from the United States Military Academy at West Point. He was commissioned a Second Lieutenant in the Artillery.

In the early 1820s, Ringgold was on the staff of General Winfield Scott. At about that time, (roughly 1825) John Vanderlyn, then working in New York City, painted Ringgold's portrait.

Ringgold's significant military innovations included the Ringgold military saddle and artillery techniques. Based on his research in Europe, he rewrote the Army's manual for artillery, which included the tactical concept of flying artillery—employing artillery pieces that could be moved quickly from place to place. The Army adapted his manual, "Instructions for Field Artillery" on March 6, 1845, and he was promoted to the rank of Major in acknowledgment of his military innovations.

== Mexican–American War ==
Ringgold served in General Zachary Taylor's occupation force in Texas as a Major of Artillery. On May 8, 1846, as he and 2,400 troops were en route to Fort Texas, they were engaged at the Battle of Palo Alto by Mexican General Mariano Arista and his force of 3,800 men.

Arista's army was stretched a mile wide, making an American bayonet charge, Taylor's first option, impossible. Taylor, in an unlikely move, advanced his artillery to attack the enemy. The use of Ringgold's flying artillery tactic won the battle for the Americans. The Mexican artillery, heavy and slow, was futile in the dense Tamaulipan thornscrub brush of Palo Alto. Arista ordered cavalry charges to flank the artillery gunners, but the American flying artillery was able to mobilize, relocate, and repel the oncoming dragoons.

During the battle, Ringgold was mortally wounded by cannon fire that mangled both his legs just below the crotch. Nevertheless, he refused to leave the field during the battle. He survived three days, during which time he debriefed on the battle, before dying in Port Isabel, Texas. He was initially buried in Port Isabel. In December 1846, he was buried in Green Mount Cemetery in Baltimore.

Robert D'Unger, then journalist at the Baltimore Democrat, claimed that he was the first to report news by telegraph while reporting Ringgold's death.

== Commemoration ==
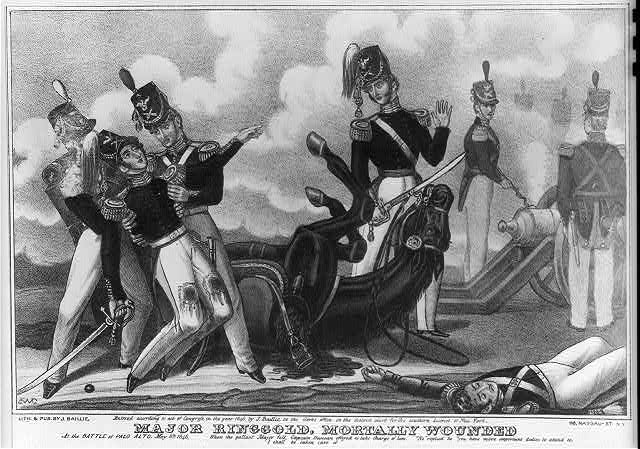
Major Ringgold, mortally wounded at the Battle of Palo Alto

His bravery was a boost to morale through the military and the country. Songs, poetry, plays were written about him, including a mention in the fourth verse of Maryland, My Maryland. A song entitled "The Death of Ringgold," commemorating his death, was a popular patriotic song in the US during the war. John H. Hewitt wrote a song, "On to the Charge", and dedicated it to the late Major Ringgold.

Cities and counties were named in his honor, including:

- Ringgold, Georgia (Catoosa County seat)
- Ringgold, Louisiana
- Ringgold, Virginia
- Ringgold, Maryland
- Ringgold Township, Pennsylvania
- Ringgold County, Iowa
- New Ringgold, Pennsylvania

Also:

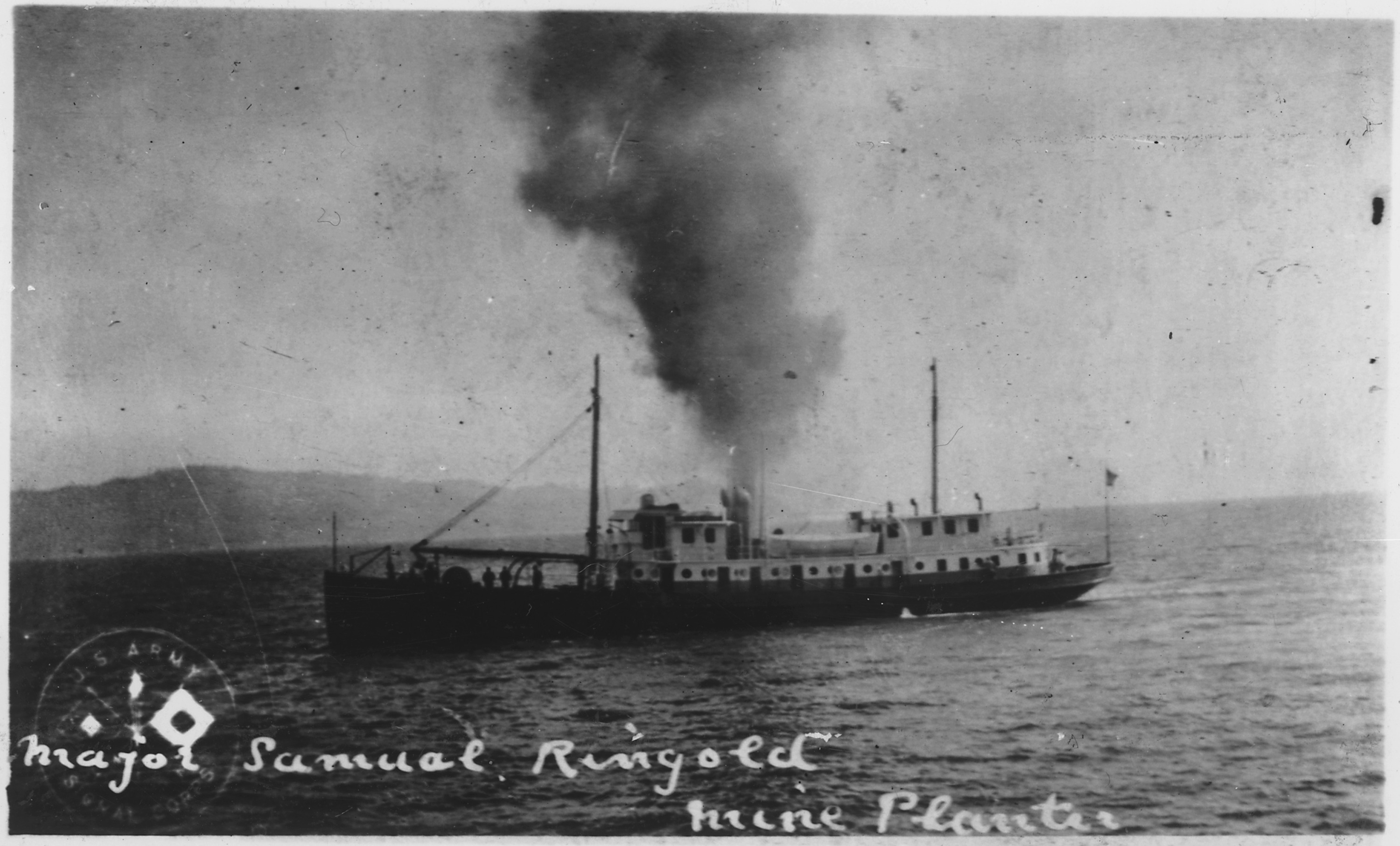
USAMP Major Samuel Ringgold, built 1904 (National Archives and Records Administration)

- The Ringgold Civic Park in Brownsville, Texas was named after him as well as Ringgold Street at the University of Texas at Brownsville.
- Fort Ringgold, constructed after the Mexican War in 1848 to protect the Mexican border, was named after him. It is located in Rio Grande City, Texas. The Fort is currently the home of Ringgold Elementary and the Rio Grande City Grulla Independent School District Headquarters.
- U.S. Army Mine Planter Major Samuel Ringgold built 1904.
- Ringgold Fire Company, Pulaski, New York.

== Family tree ==
Cadwalader family tree

John Cadwalader (1677–1734)	Martha Jones (1679–1747)
Thomas Cadwalader (1708–1779)	Hannah Lambert
Elizabeth Lloyd (1742–1776)	John Cadwalader (1742–1786)	Williamina Bond (1753–1837)	Lambert Cadwalader (1742–1823)	Mary McCall (1764–1848)
Archibald McCall (1767–1843)	Elizabeth Cadwalader (1774–1824)	Maria Cadwalader (1776–1811)	Samuel Ringgold (1770–1829)	Thomas Cadwalader (1779–1841)	Thomas McCall Cadwalader (1795–1873)	Maria Charlotte Gouverneur (1801–1867)
George Archibald McCall (1802–1868)	Samuel Ringgold (1796–1846)	Cadwalader Ringgold (1802–1867)	John Cadwalader (1805–1879)	George Cadwalader (1806–1879)	John Lambert Cadwalader (1836–1914)
Mary Binney Cadwalader (1829–1861)	William Henry Rawle (1823–1889)	Emily Cadwalader (1834–1892)
Frederic Rhinelander Jones (1846–1918)	Mary Cadwalader Rawle (1850–1923)
Beatrix Cadwalader Jones (1872–1959)	Max Farrand (1869–1945)

Notes:
- "Cadwalader Family Papers" (PDF). Collection 1454. Historical Society of Pennsylvania. 2007.
