= John Lambert Cadwalader =

American lawyer (1836–1914)

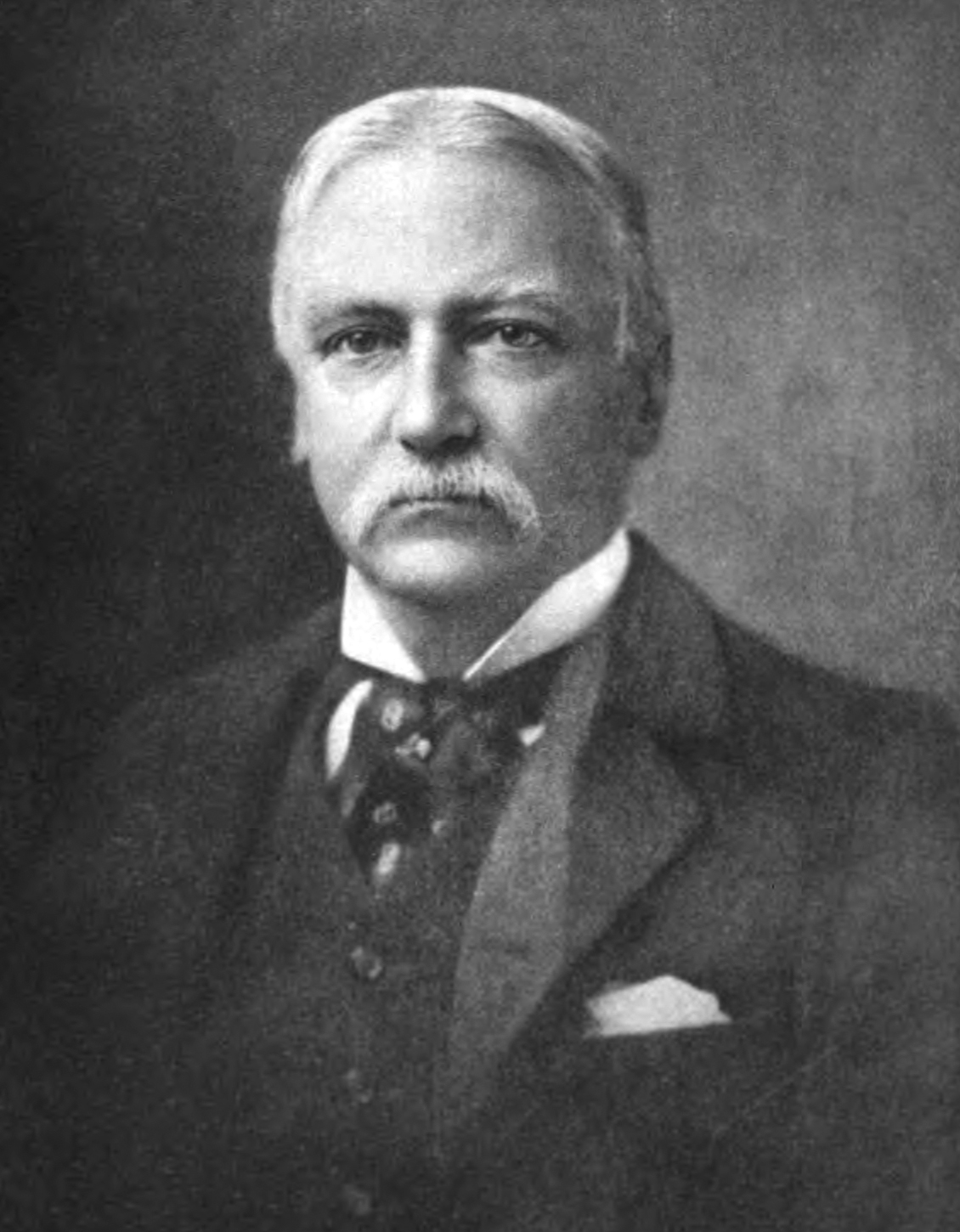
- Caldwater, c. 1914

10th United States Assistant Secretary of State
- In office June 17, 1874 – March 20, 1877
- President: Ulysses S. Grant; Rutherford B. Hayes
- Preceded by: J.C. Bancroft Davis
- Succeeded by: Frederick W. Seward

Personal details
- Born: November 17, 1836 Trenton, New Jersey, U.S.
- Died: March 11, 1914 (aged 77) New York City, U.S.
- Party: Republican
- Relations: Samuel L. Gouverneur (uncle); Lambert Cadwalader (grandfather); Gouverneur Cadwalader (nephew)
- Parent(s): Thomas McCall Cadwalader; Maria Charlotte Gouverneur
- Education: College of New Jersey (later renamed Princeton University) (BA, MA); Harvard Law School (LLB)

John Lambert Cadwalader (November 11, 1836 – March 11, 1914) was an American lawyer.

== Early life and education ==
Cadwalader was born in Trenton, New Jersey, on November 17, 1836. He was the eldest son of General Thomas McCall Cadwalader (1795–1873) and the former Maria Charlotte Gouverneur (1801–1867). His siblings included Emily Cadwalader Rawle (wife of William Henry Rawle), Mary Cadwalader Mitchell (wife of Dr. Silas Weir Mitchell), Richard McCall Cadwalader (husband of Christine Biddle), and Maria Cadwalader Hone b(wife of John Hone).

On his paternal side, his grandfather was Lambert Cadwalader, and his great-grandfather was Thomas Cadwalader. His maternal uncle was Samuel L. Gouverneur. His mother was a niece of Elizabeth (née Kortright) Monroe, the wife of U.S. President James Monroe.

He graduated from the College of New Jersey (later renamed in 1896 Princeton University) in 1856, then obtained an M.A. degree in 1859 from Princeton, and LLB from Harvard Law School in 1860.

== Career ==
He served as United States Assistant Secretary of State from 1874 to 1877, serving under Republican Presidents Ulysses S. Grant and Rutherford B. Hayes and Secretaries Hamilton Fish and William M. Evarts. In 1878, he became a name partner of Cadwalader, Wickersham & Taft, the oldest continuously operating law firm in the United States, which still carries his name. In 1905 he became a life member of the American Academy in Rome, where he acted as an adviser during the Academy's incorporation process. From 1906 to 1907, he served as president of the New York City Bar Association. He was an early trustee of the Carnegie Endowment for International Peace.

In 1909, he was mentioned as the successor of Whitelaw Reid as the U.S. Ambassador to the United Kingdom under President William Howard Taft, as urged by Taft's Attorney General George W. Wickersham, but Taft "finally decided to retain Mr. Reid."

Cadwalader was at one time president of the New York City Bar Association, but his most prominent connection in the minds of the public was with the New York Public Library, of which he was elected the second president, as the successor of John Bigelow. For many years before his election to this office, he had been a member of the board of trustees and of the executive committee of the library. He probably did more, in the form of personal activities, for the library service of New York City than any other man. He worked out the plans for combining the Astor, Lenox, and Tilden foundations into one great, central library, and was instrumental in the material carrying out of this conception. He also devoted a great deal of thought to the planning out of the building that housed the library.

== Personal life ==
Coat of Arms of John Lambert Cadwalader

Cadwalader was a trustee of the Metropolitan Museum of Art, and left the furnishings of his home on East 56th Street to the museum. He was a trustee of the Carnegie Institution from 1903 until he died in 1914. In 1912, he was sketched by John Singer Sargent.

He was on the board of the New York Zoological Society (now Wildlife Conservation Society). He was a member of the Society of the Cincinnati, the Sons of the Revolution, the American Fine Arts Society, and the American Museum of Natural History. His clubs included the Century Association, the Union League Club, Lawyers' Club, Union Club, Metropolitan Club, Knickerbocker Club, University Club, Princeton Club, and New York Yacht Club, all of New York City.

Cadwalader never married. (Note: Although Cadwalader never married, he was said to have been a "fatherly presence" in the life of noted landscape architect Beatrix Farrand, the daughter of his cousin, Mary Cadwalader Rawle Jones and Frederic Rhinelander Jones (brother of novelist Edith Wharton).)

== Death ==
On March 11, 1914, Cadwalader died at his home at 3 East 56th Street in Manhattan, at age 77. After a funeral at Grace Church in Manhattan, he was buried at Woodlands Cemetery in Philadelphia.

In his will, he left to "each of the clerks in the office of Strong & Cadwalader," who had been working for the firm for five years prior to his death, "a sum of money equal to six times their monthly wage."

== Family trees ==
Cadwalader family tree

John Cadwalader (1677–1734)	Martha Jones (1679–1747)
Thomas Cadwalader (1708–1779)	Hannah Lambert
Elizabeth Lloyd (1742–1776)	John Cadwalader (1742–1786)	Williamina Bond (1753–1837)	Lambert Cadwalader (1742–1823)	Mary McCall (1764–1848)
Archibald McCall (1767–1843)	Elizabeth Cadwalader (1774–1824)	Maria Cadwalader (1776–1811)	Samuel Ringgold (1770–1829)	Thomas Cadwalader (1779–1841)	Thomas McCall Cadwalader (1795–1873)	Maria Charlotte Gouverneur (1801–1867)
George Archibald McCall (1802–1868)	Samuel Ringgold (1796–1846)	Cadwalader Ringgold (1802–1867)	John Cadwalader (1805–1879)	George Cadwalader (1806–1879)	John Lambert Cadwalader (1836–1914)
Mary Binney Cadwalader (1829–1861)	William Henry Rawle (1823–1889)	Emily Cadwalader (1834–1892)
Frederic Rhinelander Jones (1846–1918)	Mary Cadwalader Rawle (1850–1923)
Beatrix Cadwalader Jones (1872–1959)	Max Farrand (1869–1945)

Notes:
- "Cadwalader Family Papers" (PDF). Collection 1454. Historical Society of Pennsylvania. 2007.

Monroe family tree

Lawrence Kortright (1728–1794)	Hannah Aspinwall (1738–1777)
James Monroe (1758–1831)	Elizabeth Kortright Monroe (1768–1830)	Hester Kortright (1770–1842)	Nicholas Gouverneur (1753–1802)
George Hay (1765–1830)	Eliza Monroe Hay (1786–1840)	Maria Hester Monroe (1802–1850)	Samuel L. Gouverneur (1799–1865)	Maria Charlotte Gouverneur (1801–1867)	Thomas McCall Cadwalader (1795–1873)
John Lambert Cadwalader (1836–1914)

Notes:

Political offices
Preceded by J.C. Bancroft Davis	United States Assistant Secretary of State; June 17, 1874 – March 20, 1877	Succeeded by Frederick W. Seward
