= John Cadwalader =

John Cadwalader is the name of:

- John Cadwalader (general) (1742–1786), Pennsylvanian merchant, general in the Revolutionary War
- John Cadwalader (jurist) (1805–1879), American lawyer, jurist and politician
- John Lambert Cadwalader (1836–1914), American lawyer, Assistant U.S. Secretary of State
