= George Cadwalader =

United States Army general (1806-1879)

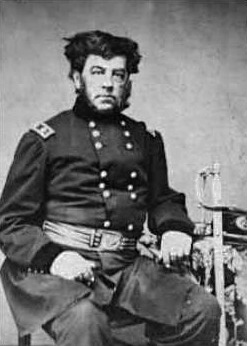
- George Cadwalader
- Born: May 16, 1806; Philadelphia, Pennsylvania
- Died: February 3, 1879 (aged 72); Philadelphia, Pennsylvania
- Burial place: Christ Church Burial Ground, Philadelphia, Pennsylvania
- Military career
- Allegiance: United States; Union
- Branch: United States Army; Union Army
- Service years: 1847–1848, 1861–1865
- Rank: Major General
- Commands: 2nd Brigade, 3rd Division; Military Commander of Maryland; 1st Div, Army of the Shenandoah
- Conflicts: Mexican–American War; American Civil War

George Cadwalader (May 16, 1806 – February 3, 1879) was a general in the United States Army during the Mexican–American War and American Civil War.

== Biography ==
Cadwalader was born and raised in Philadelphia. He studied law and was admitted to the bar. He served in the Pennsylvania state militia and suppressed anti-foreign riots in Philadelphia.

His father was Thomas Cadwalader, not to be confused with his cousin Thomas McCall Cadwalader (1795–1873), who was a general from New Jersey. His mother was Mary Biddle, who was the daughter of Clement Biddle, (1740–1818) who served in the American Revolutionary War.

He married Frances Butler Mease in 1830. They had one daughter, Frances, who died young.

== Pennsylvania Militia ==
In 1824, Cadwalader formed a Pennsylvania State Militia artillery company known as the Philadelphia Grays and served as company captain. In 1832, he was elected brigadier general of the First Brigade, First Division of the Pennsylvania State Militia.

While holding this position, he was criticized for his weak role in the Philadelphia anti-Catholic riots of 1844. Cadwalader refused to allow the militia to take action as rioters destroyed the Irish-Catholic neighborhood on Kensington in May 1844. When he did call out the militia five days after the violence began, his troops primarily stood as observers and did not actively try to suppress the riots. Cadwalader argued that he could not do so without express order from the governor. As a result, state law was changed several years later to permit emergency action without express approval from the governor.

In July of that same year, during three days of rioting in Southwark, a largely Catholic neighborhood in South Philadelphia, Cadwalader ordered his troops to fire into the crowd of nativists trying to destroy St. Philip Neri Church. The street battle resulted in the deaths of twelve rioters and two militiamen, with many more injured. These actions resulted in concern over the use of the military against civilian populations and led directly to the creation of a much stronger and more professional police force in Philadelphia.

In 1845, Cadwalader was elected an honorary member of the Pennsylvania Society of the Cincinnati.

== Mexican–American War ==
On March 3, 1847, Cadwalader was appointed brigadier general and took command of a brigade of reinforcements being sent to Winfield Scott in central Mexico. His unit was designated the 2nd Brigade in the newly formed 3rd Division under Gideon Pillow. He participated in the battles of Contreras, Churubusco, and Chapultepec. For his services at Chapultepec, he was brevetted major general in the Regular Army, to rank from September 13, 1847.

Cadwalader was an original member of the Aztec Club of 1847 and was honorably discharged from the Army on July 20, 1848.

== Civil War ==
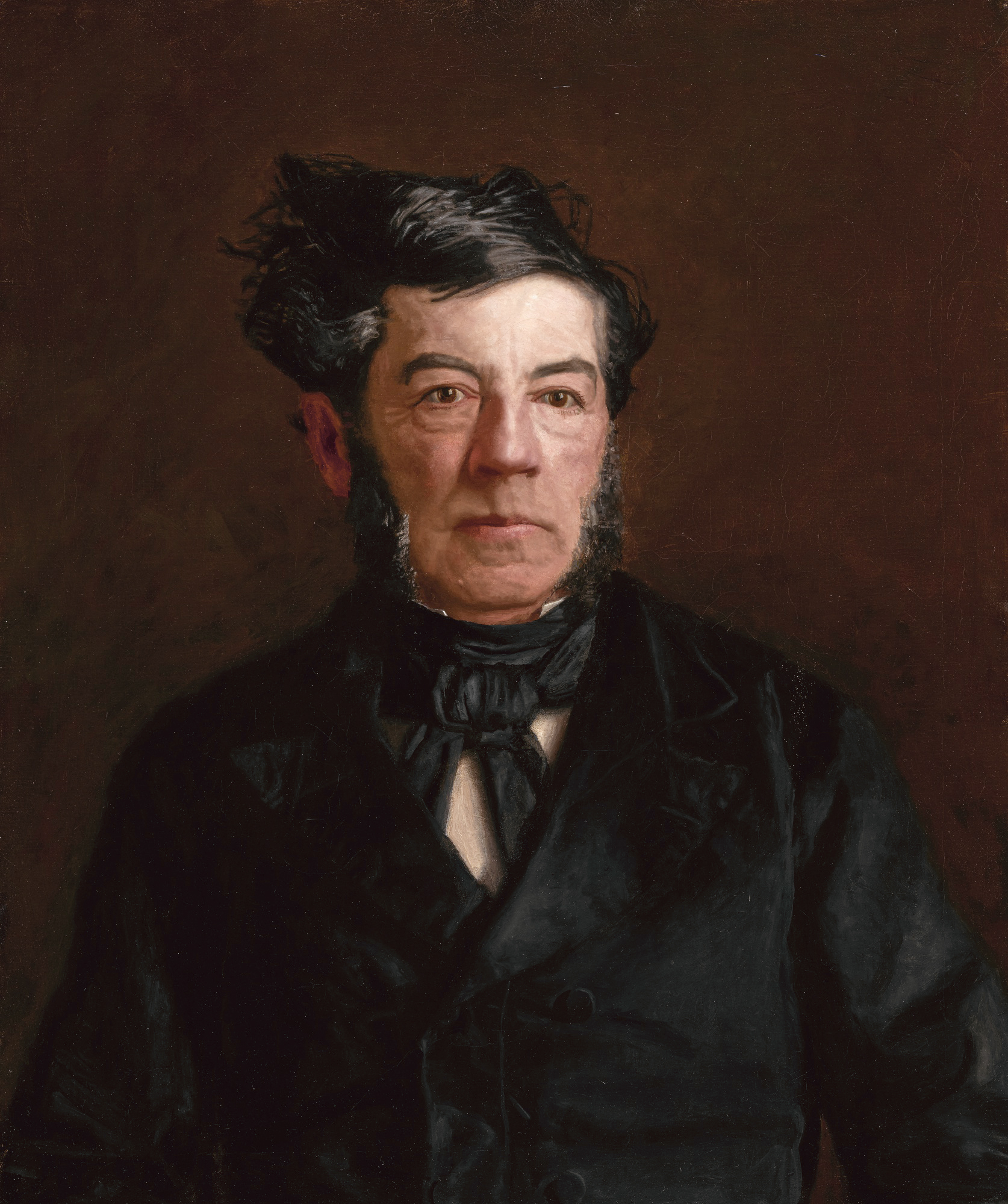
Portrait of Cadwalader by Thomas Eakins

When the Civil War broke out, Cadwalader immediately volunteered his services to the Union cause. Due to his distinguished military experience, he was appointed major general of Pennsylvania Volunteers by Governor Andrew Curtin in April 1861.

On May 15, he was appointed military commander in Maryland, where Union communications were being threatened by local Confederate sympathizers. On May 25, federal troops arrested a Maryland planter, John Merryman, who had been recruiting soldiers for the Confederate army and imprisoned him at Fort McHenry in Baltimore, where General Cadwalader had his headquarters. When Chief Justice Taney issued a writ of habeas corpus for Merryman, Cadwalader ignored him, stating that he was authorized by the President to suspend habeas corpus. This dispute resulted in the case of Ex parte Merryman.

Cadwalader later took command of the 1st Division in Robert Patterson's Army of the Shenandoah. On May 25, 1862, he was commissioned major general in the United States Volunteers. Cadwalader later commanded the post at Corinth, Mississippi. He returned to Pennsylvania and commanded the post at Philadelphia and successively the District of Philadelphia, the District of the Brandywine, and the District of the Susquehanna before resigning in July 1865. He spent the rest of his life in Philadelphia.

In April 1865, General Cadwalader helped found the Military Order of the Loyal Legion of the United States (MOLLUS), a quasi-fraternal organization for former Union Army and Navy officers. He was officially elected a member of the Pennsylvania commandery on November 1, 1865 and was assigned MOLLUS insignia number 60. He served as Commander of the Pennsylvania Commandery of the Loyal Legion from November 4, 1865 until his death. (The national governing body of MOLLUS, called the Commandery in Chief, was not established until 1885. Since Pennsylvania was both the oldest and largest commandery in the organization, Cadwalader is considered to be the first Commander in Chief of MOLLUS.)

Cadwalader died in Philadelphia on February 3, 1879.

== Family tree ==
Cadwalader family tree

John Cadwalader (1677–1734)	Martha Jones (1679–1747)
Thomas Cadwalader (1708–1779)	Hannah Lambert
Elizabeth Lloyd (1742–1776)	John Cadwalader (1742–1786)	Williamina Bond (1753–1837)	Lambert Cadwalader (1742–1823)	Mary McCall (1764–1848)
Archibald McCall (1767–1843)	Elizabeth Cadwalader (1774–1824)	Maria Cadwalader (1776–1811)	Samuel Ringgold (1770–1829)	Thomas Cadwalader (1779–1841)	Thomas McCall Cadwalader (1795–1873)	Maria Charlotte Gouverneur (1801–1867)
George Archibald McCall (1802–1868)	Samuel Ringgold (1796–1846)	Cadwalader Ringgold (1802–1867)	John Cadwalader (1805–1879)	George Cadwalader (1806–1879)	John Lambert Cadwalader (1836–1914)
Mary Binney Cadwalader (1829–1861)	William Henry Rawle (1823–1889)	Emily Cadwalader (1834–1892)
Frederic Rhinelander Jones (1846–1918)	Mary Cadwalader Rawle (1850–1923)
Beatrix Cadwalader Jones (1872–1959)	Max Farrand (1869–1945)

Notes:
- "Cadwalader Family Papers" (PDF). Collection 1454. Historical Society of Pennsylvania. 2007.

== See also ==
- List of American Civil War generals (Union)
