= General Cadwalader =

General Cadawaler may refer to:

- George Cadwalader (1806–1879), U.S. Army major general
- John Cadwalader (general) (1742–1786), Pennsylvania Militia general in the American Revolutionary War
- Thomas McCall Cadwalader (1795–1873), U.S. Army major general
