= Samuel Ringgold =

Samuel Ringgold may refer to:

- Samuel Ringgold (congressman) (1770–1829), U.S. Congressman from Maryland
- Samuel Ringgold (United States Army officer) (1796–1846), his son, officer in the U.S. Army during the Mexican-American War
- Samuel Ringgold Ward (1817–c. 1866), son of slaves and author of Autobiography of a Fugitive Negro
