= John Cadwalader (judge) =

American judge, lawyer, and politician (1805–1879)

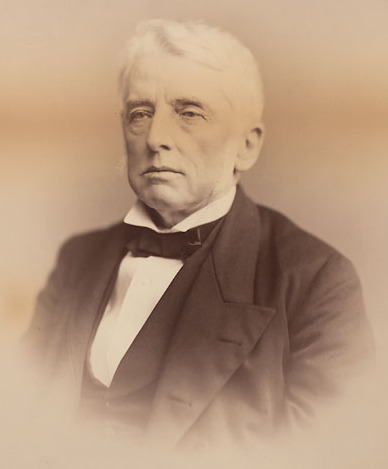
- Cadwalader in 1877

Judge of the United States District Court for the Eastern District of Pennsylvania
- In office April 24, 1858 – January 26, 1879
- Appointed by: James Buchanan
- Preceded by: John K. Kane
- Succeeded by: William Butler

Member of the U.S. House of Representatives from Pennsylvania's 5th district
- In office March 4, 1855 – March 3, 1857
- Preceded by: John McNair
- Succeeded by: Owen Jones

Personal details
- Born: John Cadwalader; April 1, 1805 Philadelphia, Pennsylvania
- Died: January 26, 1879 (aged 73) Philadelphia, Pennsylvania
- Resting place: Christ Church Burial Ground; Philadelphia, Pennsylvania
- Party: Democratic
- Relations: Horace Binney; Edith Wharton
- Relatives: Clement Biddle; John Cadwalader; George Cadwalader; Thomas Cadwalader; Mary Cadwalader Rawle Jones; Beatrix Farrand
- Education: University of Pennsylvania (B.A.) read law
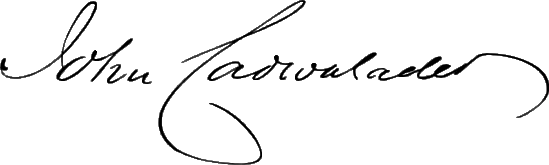
- Signature

John Cadwalader (April 1, 1805 – January 26, 1879) was an 18th-century American lawyer, jurist, and politician who served one term as a United States representative from Pennsylvania and 11 years a United States district judge of the United States District Court for the Eastern District of Pennsylvania.

== Early life ==
Cadwalader was born on April 1, 1805, in Philadelphia, Pennsylvania into the prominent Cadwalader family. He was the son of Mary (née Biddle) Cadwalader (1781–1850), of the Philadelphia Biddle family, and military leader Thomas Cadwalader (1779–1841). Among his siblings was General George Cadwalader.

His paternal grandfather was General John Cadwalader and his great-grandfather was Dr. Thomas Cadwalader. His maternal grandfather, Clement Biddle, was also a military leader, having served under George Washington during the Revolutionary War.

He received a Bachelor of Arts degree in 1821 from the University of Pennsylvania and read law in 1825.

== Career ==
He entered private practice in Philadelphia from 1825 to 1855. He was Solicitor for the Second Bank of the United States in Philadelphia in 1830.

He was Vice Provost of the Law Academy of Philadelphia from 1833 to 1853. He was a captain in the Pennsylvania State Militia in Harrisburg, Pennsylvania in 1844, which was called out for the Philadelphia Nativist riots.

He was elected as a member of the American Philosophical Society in 1867.

=== Congressional service ===
Cadwalader was elected as a Democrat from Pennsylvania's 5th congressional district to the United States House of Representatives of the 34th United States Congress, serving from March 4, 1855, to March 3, 1857. He declined to be a candidate for renomination in 1856. He briefly resumed the practice of law in Philadelphia.

=== Federal judicial service ===
Cadwalader was nominated by President James Buchanan on April 19, 1858, to a seat on the United States District Court for the Eastern District of Pennsylvania vacated by Judge John K. Kane. He was confirmed by the United States Senate on April 24, 1858, and received his commission the same day. His service terminated on January 26, 1879, due to his death in Philadelphia. He was interred in Christ Church Burial Ground at the old Christ Church in Philadelphia. He was succeeded by Judge William Butler, who was nominated by President Rutherford B. Hayes.

== Personal life ==
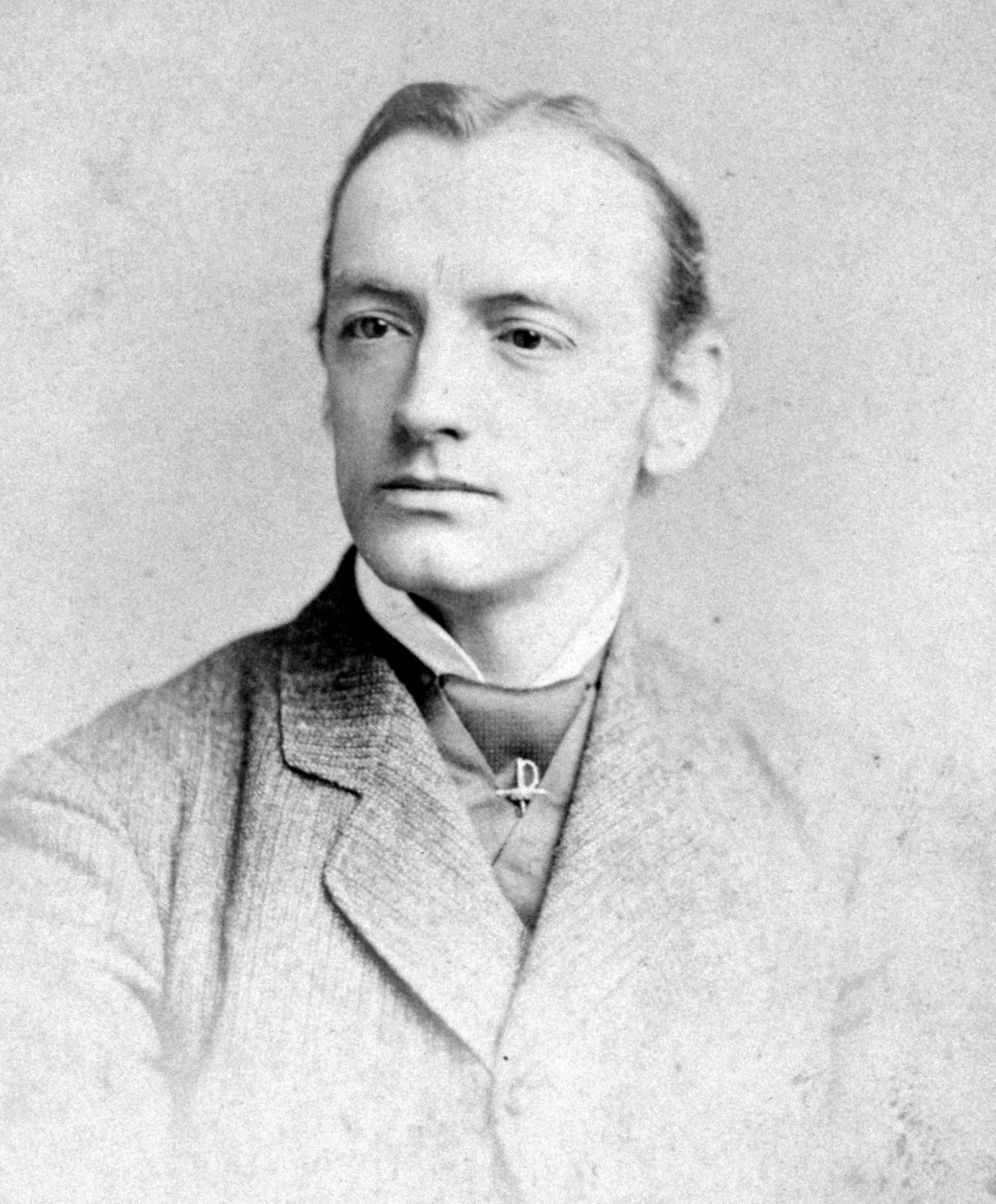
Portrait of the jurist's son, John Cadwalader Jr.

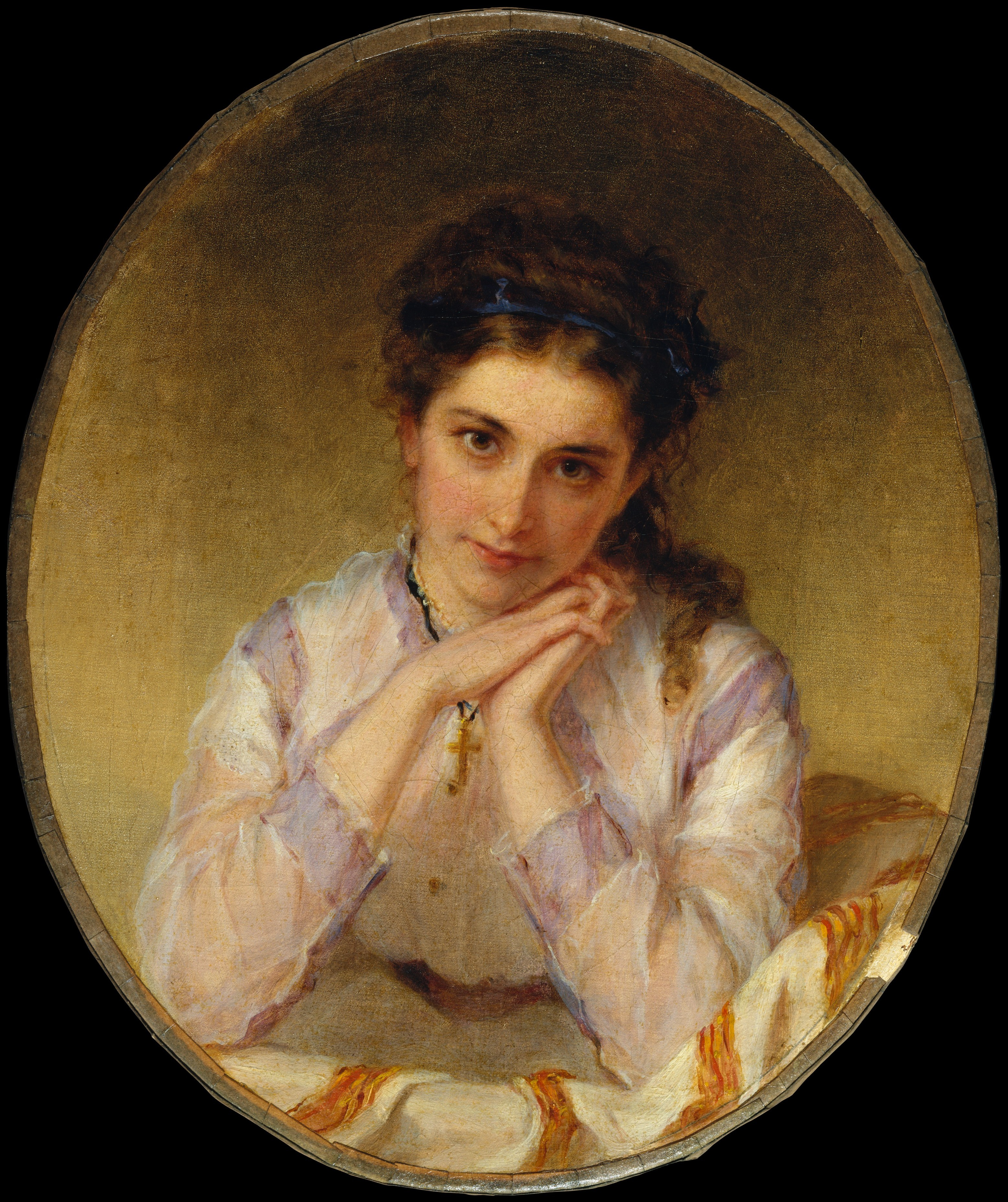
His granddaughter, Mary Cadwalader Rawle, painted by William Oliver Stone (1868)

Cadwalader first married Mary Binney (1805–1831), daughter of Horace Binney, an Anti-Jacksonian United States Representative known for his public speeches; he founded the Hasty Pudding Club at Harvard. Together, Mary and John had two daughters, including:

- Mary Binney Cadwalader (1829–1861), who married William Henry Rawle.
- Elizabeth Binney Cadwalader (1831–1900), who married George Harrison Hare of the U.S. Navy.

Following his first wife's death from complications of childbirth, he married Henrietta Maria Bancker (1806–1889) with whom he had six children, including:

- Charles Evert Cadwalader (1839–1907), who fought in the U.S. Civil War and later became a physician.
- Anne Cadwalader (1842–1927), who married Rev. Henry James Rowland, eldest son of William Rowland, in 1878.
- John Cadwalader Jr. (1843–1925), who married Mary Helen Fisher, a daughter of J. Francis Fisher and Eliza Izard (née Middleton) Fisher.

=== Descendants ===
Through his eldest daughter Mary, Cadwalader was the grandfather of Mary Cadwalader Rawle (1850–1935), who was married on March 24, 1870, to Frederic Rhinelander Jones (the brother of Edith Wharton); their daughter in turn was landscape architect Beatrix Cadwalader Jones Farrand (1872–1959).

Cadwalader's grandson, John Cadwalader III (1874–1934), became trustee of the estate of his aunt Sophia Georgiana (née Fisher) Coxe (1841–1926) which funded the MMI Preparatory School.

Cadwalader family tree

John Cadwalader (1677–1734)	Martha Jones (1679–1747)
Thomas Cadwalader (1708–1779)	Hannah Lambert
Elizabeth Lloyd (1742–1776)	John Cadwalader (1742–1786)	Williamina Bond (1753–1837)	Lambert Cadwalader (1742–1823)	Mary McCall (1764–1848)
Archibald McCall (1767–1843)	Elizabeth Cadwalader (1774–1824)	Maria Cadwalader (1776–1811)	Samuel Ringgold (1770–1829)	Thomas Cadwalader (1779–1841)	Thomas McCall Cadwalader (1795–1873)	Maria Charlotte Gouverneur (1801–1867)
George Archibald McCall (1802–1868)	Samuel Ringgold (1796–1846)	Cadwalader Ringgold (1802–1867)	John Cadwalader (1805–1879)	George Cadwalader (1806–1879)	John Lambert Cadwalader (1836–1914)
Mary Binney Cadwalader (1829–1861)	William Henry Rawle (1823–1889)	Emily Cadwalader (1834–1892)
Frederic Rhinelander Jones (1846–1918)	Mary Cadwalader Rawle (1850–1923)
Beatrix Cadwalader Jones (1872–1959)	Max Farrand (1869–1945)

Notes:
- "Cadwalader Family Papers" (PDF). Collection 1454. Historical Society of Pennsylvania. 2007.

U.S. House of Representatives
Preceded by John McNair	Member of the U.S. House of Representatives from Pennsylvania's 5th congressional district 1855–1857	Succeeded by Owen Jones
Legal offices
Preceded by John K. Kane	Judge of the United States District Court for the Eastern District of Pennsylvania; 1858–1879	Succeeded by William Butler
