= John Cadwalader (general) =

American general 1742–1786

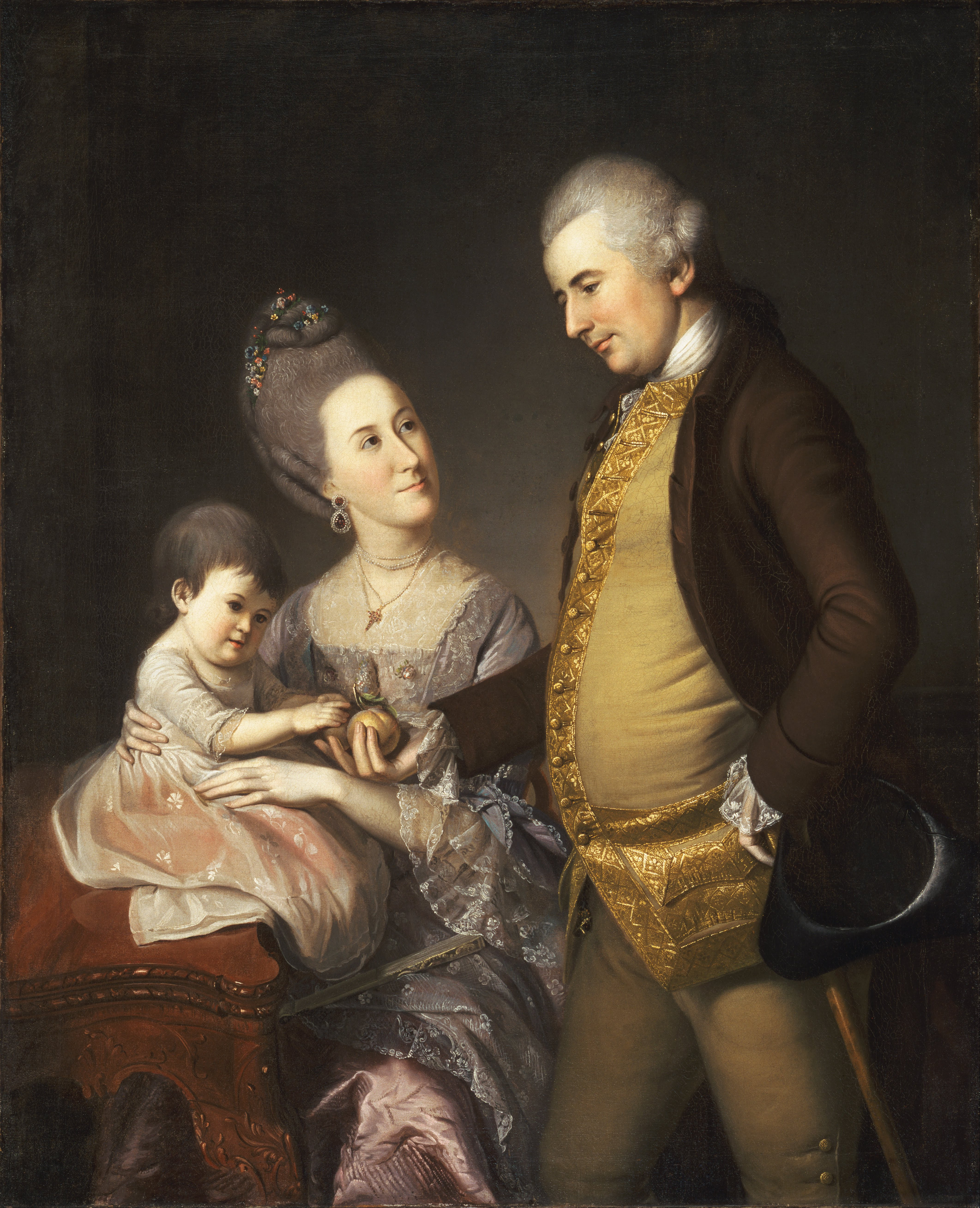
- ^{Philadelphia Museum of Art} John and Elizabeth Lloyd Cadwalader and their Daughter Anne (1772) by Charles Willson Peale.
- Born: January 10, 1742; Trenton, New Jersey
- Died: February 10, 1786 (aged 44); Kent County, Maryland
- Occupation: Merchant
- Spouses: Elizabeth Lloyd; Williamina Bond
- Children: Anne, b: 1771; Elizabeth, b: 1774; Maria, b: 1776; Thomas, b: 1779; Frances, b: 1781; John, b: 1784
- Parent(s): Thomas Cadwalader; Hannah Lambert

John Cadwalader (January 10, 1742 – February 10, 1786) was a commander of Pennsylvanian troops during the American Revolutionary War and served under George Washington. He was with Washington at Valley Forge.

== Early life ==
John Cadwalader was born in Trenton, New Jersey of Quaker parentage, the eldest son of Thomas Cadwalader (1707–1779) and Hannah Lambert, his wife. In 1750, the Cadwalader family removed to Philadelphia where John and Lambert Cadwalader, his brother, were merchants. His paternal side of the family was Welsh, while his mother was from England.

In 1768 he was elected to the American Philosophical Society.

== Career ==
Coat of Arms of John Cadwalader

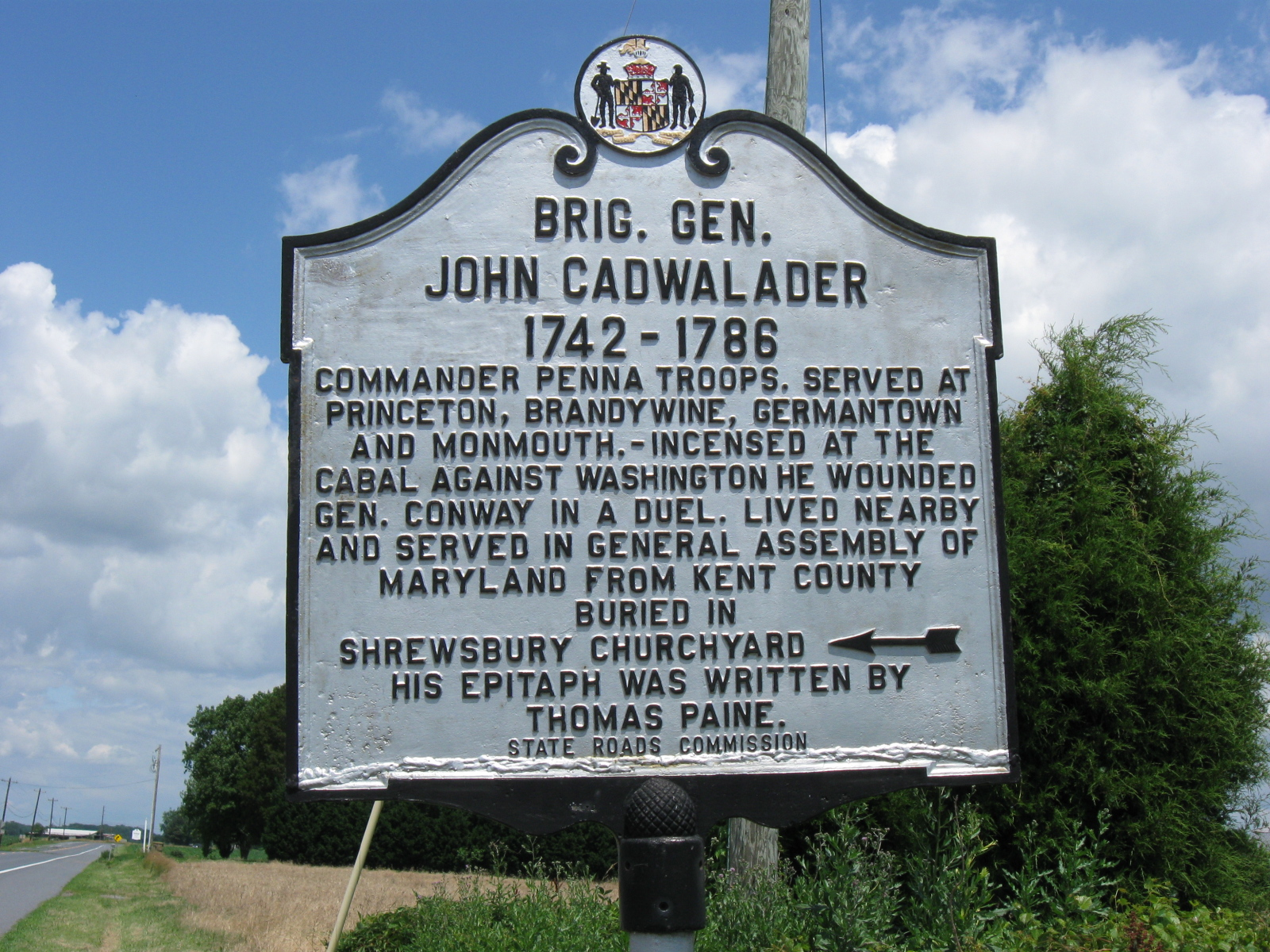
Plaque commemorating Gen. John Cadwalader

In 1776, Colonel John Cadwalader was elected senior officer of the Philadelphia Associators, a volunteer militia founded by Benjamin Franklin in 1747. By December, Cadwalader and the Associators were positioned about 10 miles south of Trenton on the west side of the Delaware River in Bucks County, Pennsylvania at the ferry between Bristol, Pennsylvania and Burlington, New Jersey. Cadwalader had received orders to send his column across the river on the night of December 25–26 and march to Trenton from the south. Meanwhile, George Washington's column would cross the river to the north of Trenton and attack the city from that direction. After successfully crossing his light forces, Cadwalader discovered that river ice prevented crossing his artillery. He then returned his column to the Pennsylvania side, leaving Washington's forces unsupported in New Jersey. It was fortunate for Washington that a Hessian column, having marched from their garrison at Bordentown to Mount Holly where they were engaged in the Battle of Iron Works Hill, were no longer in position to defend Trenton. Washington was successful in his surprise attack on the morning of December 26 against the Hessian garrison in Trenton.

Cadwalader and his column did cross the river the next day. Cadwalader subsequently took part in the further actions in New Jersey, which forced the British commander General William Howe and his principal subordinate, Lord Cornwallis, to surrender the colony to the Americans.

After the Conway Cabal, he fought a duel with Thomas Conway in 1778 in which Cadwalader wounded his opponent with a shot in the mouth. Supposedly Cadwalader, a supporter of Washington throughout the cabal, boasted, "I have stopped that damned rascal's lying anyway" as he stood over the bleeding Conway.

=== Post-war ===
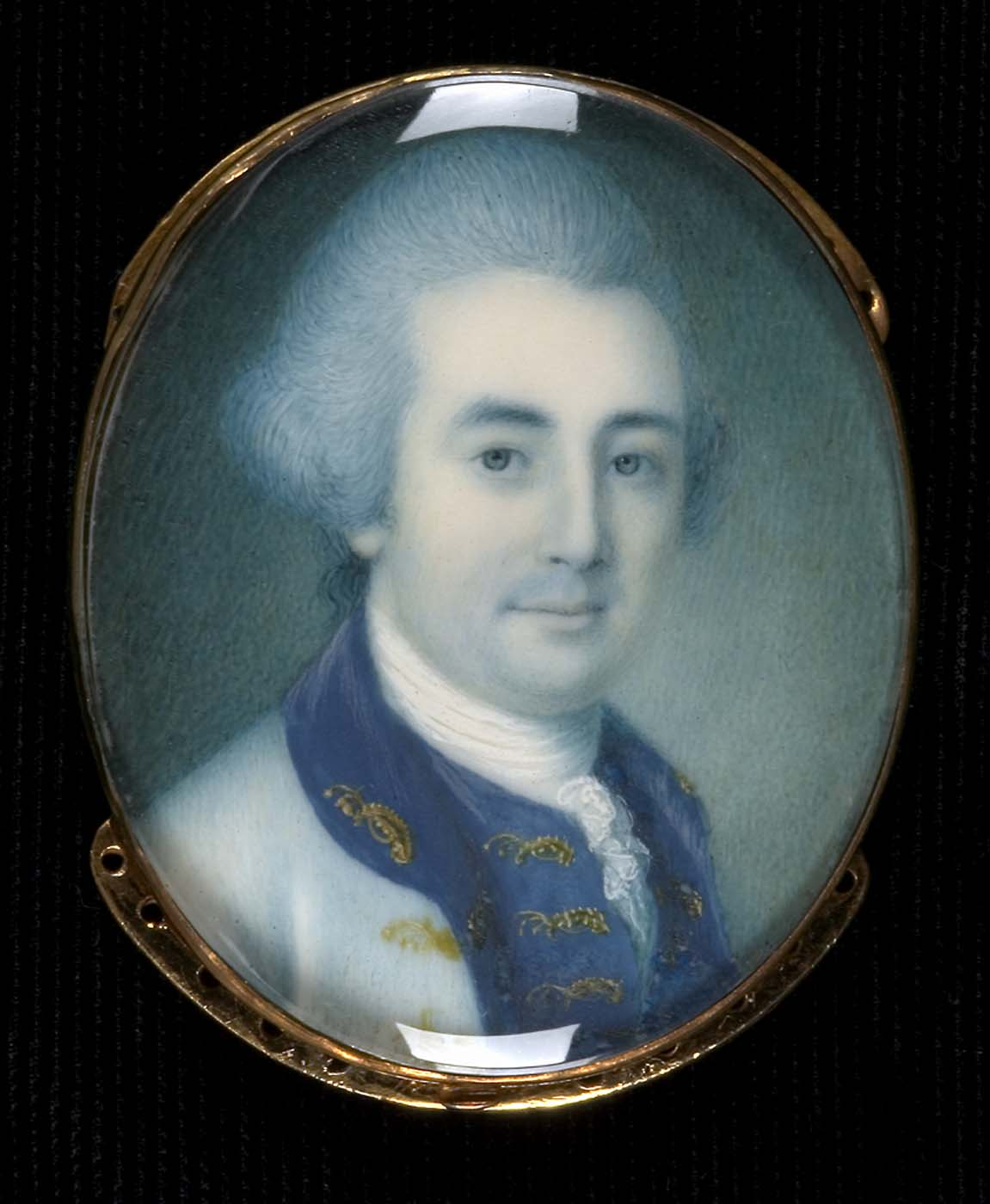
Watercolor by Charles Willson Peale, circa 1788

In 1779, Cadwalader became a trustee of the University of Pennsylvania and returned to his estate on the banks of the Sassafras River at Shrewsbury, Kent County, Maryland. He became a member of the Maryland State Assembly.

== Personal life ==
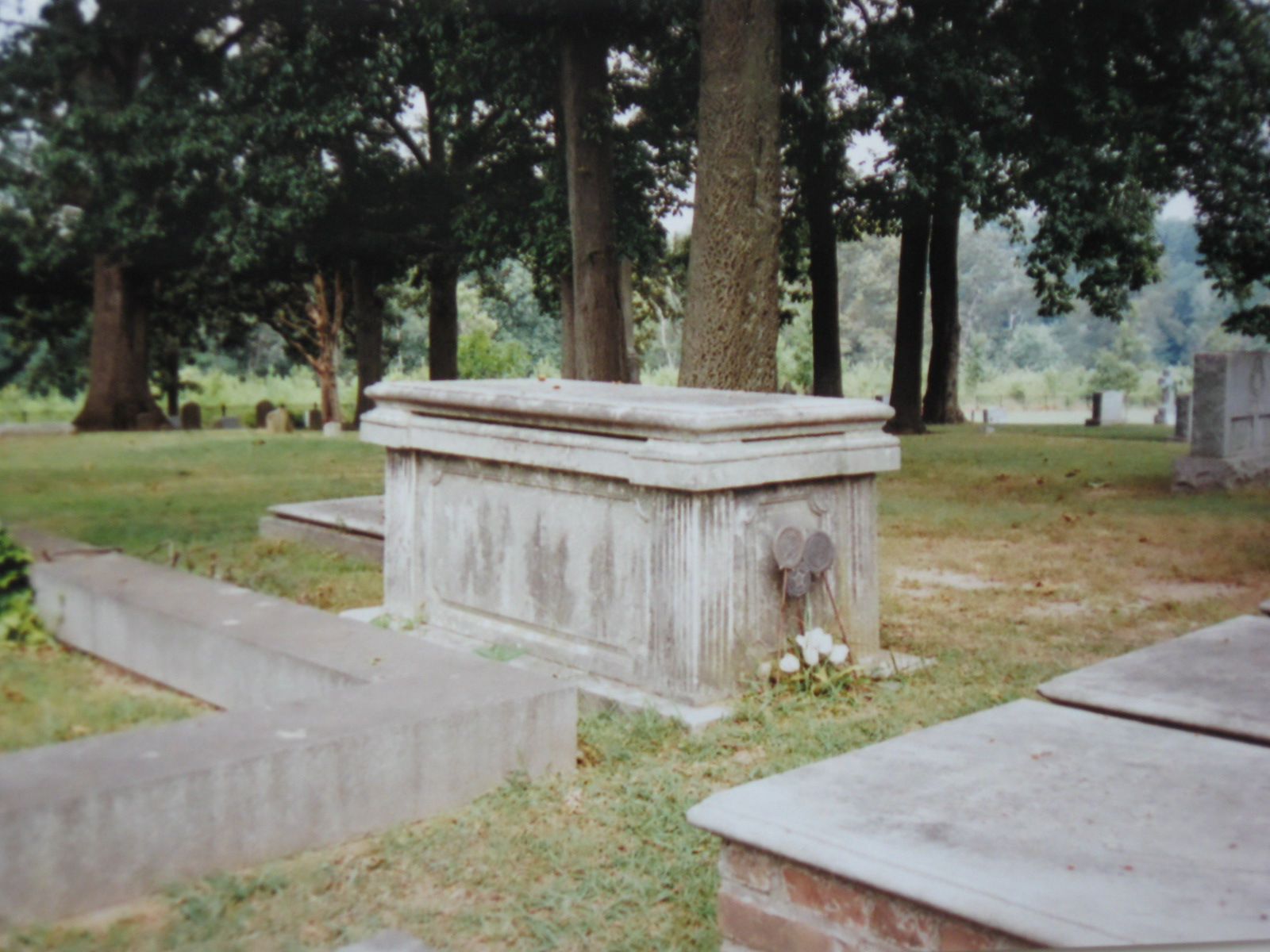
Gen. John Cadwalader's grave at Shrewsbury Chapel

On September 25, 1768, John Cadwalader married Elizabeth Lloyd (1742–1776), the daughter of Edward Lloyd, of Talbot County, Maryland. Her brother, Edward Lloyd IV, was a delegate to the Continental Congress for Maryland. Among their children were:

- Anne Cadwalader (b. 1771)
- Elizabeth Cadwalader (b. 1774)
- Maria Cadwalader (1776–1811), who married Samuel Ringgold, who became a congressman representing Maryland. Two of their sons, Samuel Ringgold and Cadwalader Ringgold, had distinguished military careers.

After the death of his first wife, Cadwalader married Williamina Bond (1753–1837) in 1779. She was a daughter of Dr. Phineas Bond, of Philadelphia and niece of Thomas Bond. Together, they were the parents of:

- Thomas Cadwalader (1779–1841), who became a general of the Pennsylvania militia and married Mary Biddle, daughter of Clement Biddle.
- Frances Cadwalader (1781–1843), who married the Hon. David Erskine in 1799. He served as the British Ambassador to the United States from 1807 to 1809 before succeeding as the 2nd Baron Erskine in 1823.
- John Cadwalader (b. 1784)

Cadwalader died February 10, 1786, of pneumonia. He is buried at Shrewsbury Chapel, Kent County, Maryland. Thomas Paine wrote his epitaph:

His early and inflexible patriotism will endear his memory to all true friends of the American Revolution. It may with strictest justice be said of him, that he possessed a heart incapable of deceiving. His manners were formed on the nicest sense of honor and the whole tenor of his life was governed by this principle. The companions of his youth were the companions of his manhood. He never lost a friend by insincerity nor made one by deception. His domestic virtues were truly exemplary and while they served to endear the remembrances they embitter the loss of him to all his numerous friends and connections.

=== Descendants ===
Through his daughter Frances, he was a grandfather of Thomas Americus Erskine, 3rd Baron Erskine (1802–1877), and John Cadwalader Erskine, 4th Baron Erskine (1804–1882), Edward Morris Erskine (1817–1883), and James Stuart Erskine (1821–1904), who was created Freiherr von Erskine by King Ludwig II of Bavaria.

=== Slaveholding ===
The Cadwalader family papers at the Historical Society of Pennsylvania detail and contextualize Cadwalader's slaveholding. A personal estate inventory lists each of Cadwalader's enslaved people by name and age, in total 107 women, children, and men.

=== Legacy ===
John and Elizabeth Cadwalader built a city house on 2nd between Spruce & Union (now Delancey) Streets in Philadelphia in 1770, and they commissioned suites of furniture from cabinetmakers such as Thomas Affleck and Benjamin Randolph. Surviving pieces are among the finest and best-documented Philadelphia Chippendale furniture ever made. Colonial Grandeur in Philadelphia: The House and Furniture of General John Cadwalader (The Historical Society of Pennsylvania, 1964) Examples are in the Metropolitan Museum of Art, the Philadelphia Museum of Art, the Winterthur Museum, and other collections. A Cadwalader easy (wing) chair with hairy-paw feet by Affleck sold at Sotheby's New York for $2.75 million on January 31, 1987, setting a world record for the highest price ever paid for any piece of furniture at auction.

== Family tree ==
Cadwalader family tree

John Cadwalader (1677–1734)	Martha Jones (1679–1747)
Thomas Cadwalader (1708–1779)	Hannah Lambert
Elizabeth Lloyd (1742–1776)	John Cadwalader (1742–1786)	Williamina Bond (1753–1837)	Lambert Cadwalader (1742–1823)	Mary McCall (1764–1848)
Archibald McCall (1767–1843)	Elizabeth Cadwalader (1774–1824)	Maria Cadwalader (1776–1811)	Samuel Ringgold (1770–1829)	Thomas Cadwalader (1779–1841)	Thomas McCall Cadwalader (1795–1873)	Maria Charlotte Gouverneur (1801–1867)
George Archibald McCall (1802–1868)	Samuel Ringgold (1796–1846)	Cadwalader Ringgold (1802–1867)	John Cadwalader (1805–1879)	George Cadwalader (1806–1879)	John Lambert Cadwalader (1836–1914)
Mary Binney Cadwalader (1829–1861)	William Henry Rawle (1823–1889)	Emily Cadwalader (1834–1892)
Frederic Rhinelander Jones (1846–1918)	Mary Cadwalader Rawle (1850–1923)
Beatrix Cadwalader Jones (1872–1959)	Max Farrand (1869–1945)

Notes:
- "Cadwalader Family Papers" (PDF). Collection 1454. Historical Society of Pennsylvania. 2007.
