= USS Weasel =

History

United States
- Name: USS Weasel
- Launched: c. 1822
- Fate: Sold

General characteristics
- Type: Schooner
- Propulsion: Sail
- Armament: 3 × 9 pdr (4.1 kg) guns

The USS Weasel was a three-gun schooner in the United States Navy.

The Weasel was built at Baltimore and was initially intended to serve as a merchant vessel that would operate the area of Chesapeake Bay. However, the build of her keel favored the strategic approach of the West Indies Squadron, which became notorious for using smaller vessels to pursue escaping pirates into shallow waters, so it was acquired by the Navy in 1822 and outfitted for military use. The process took place at Norfolk, with the ship being commissioned in 1823.

== Service history ==
Lieutenant Beverley Kennon was placed in charge of the vessel, serving under squadron leader commodore David Porter. On February 15, 1823, she sailed off Hampton Roads along other members of the anti-piracy operations. By the following month, the Weasel was monitoring the waters in the eastern Caribbean. Porter to assigned it to the Mona Passage along the brigantine USS Spark following orders from United States Secretary of the Navy Samuel L. Southard as the area had become the operation center of Roberto Cofresí and other pirates. By the year's end, an outbreak of yellow fever forced the Weasel to withdraw from the region in order to recruit a new crew.

Returning to the West Indies in 1824, captain Charles Boarman was commanded to monitor the western waters of Puerto Rico as part of an international force. There, the Weasel located a sloop commanded by Cofresí off Culebra, but it fled to Vieques and ran inland into dense vegetation; Boarman could only recover the abandoned vessel. A second outbreak forced another return to the United States, returning in fall. However, the capture of Cofresí in early 1825 resulted in a sharp decline of piracy in the Caribbean. Consequently, the United States Navy sold the schooners that belonged to the West Indies Squadron. The Weasel itself was sold to an unknown buyer within a year of Cofresí's capture.
