= Friends Burying Ground, Trenton =

Cemetery in Trenton, New Jersey, USA

Coordinates: 40.2215°N 74.7623°W

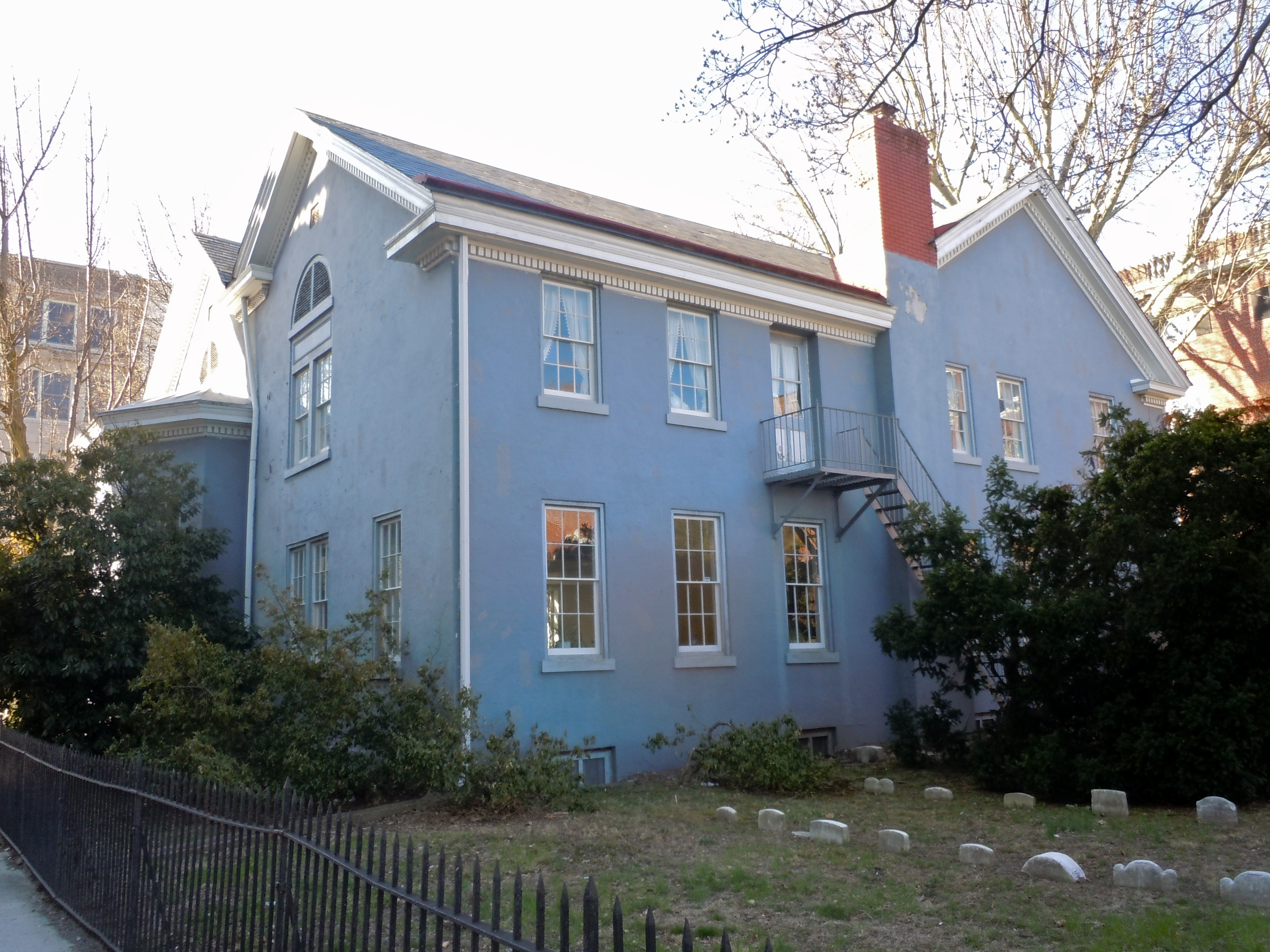
Graves in front of the Trenton Friends Meeting House

Friends Burying Ground is a cemetery in Trenton in the U.S. state of New Jersey. The cemetery is located on the west side of North Montgomery Street north of East Hanover Street, adjacent to the Trenton Friends Meeting House.

== Notable burials ==
- Lambert Cadwalader (1742–1823), represented New Jersey in the Continental Congress (1784–87) and the United States House of Representatives (1789–91 and 1793–95.
- George Clymer (1739–1813), signer of the United States Declaration of Independence and the United States Constitution.
- Mary Willing Clymer, (1770–1852), Daughter of Thomas Willing and daughter-in-law to George Clymer
- Philemon Dickinson (1739–1809), represented New Jersey in the United States Senate from 1790 to 1793.
- Richard Howell (1754–1802), 3rd Governor of New Jersey, from 1793 to 1801.
