= Mary Cadwalader Rawle Jones =

American author and socialite (1850–1935)

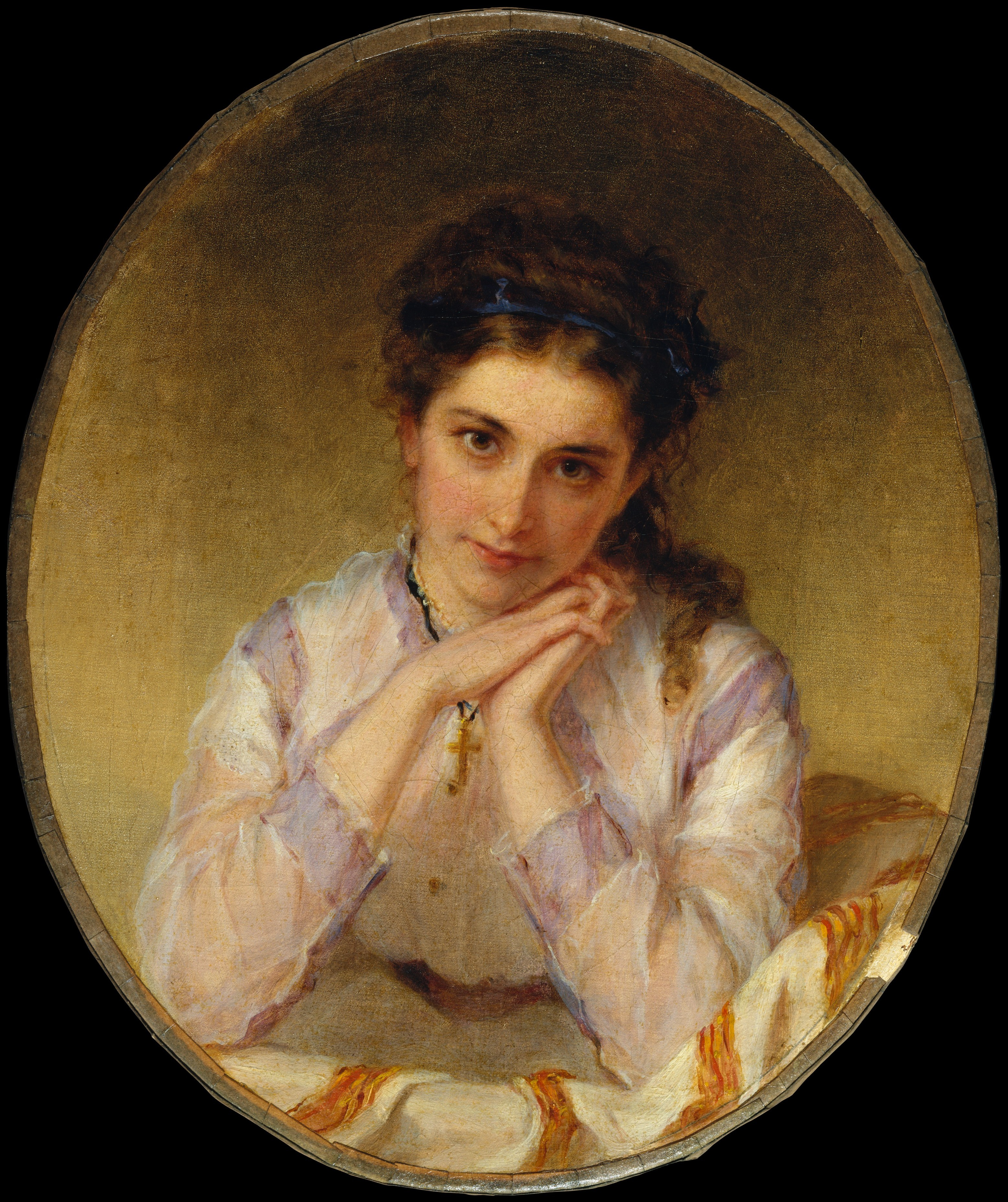
- Portrait of Mary by William Oliver Stone, 1868
- Born: December 12, 1850; Philadelphia, Pennsylvania, U.S.
- Died: September 22, 1935 (aged 84); London, England
- Spouse: Frederic Rhinelander Jones (m. 1870; div. 1896)
- Children: Beatrix Cadwalader Jones
- Relatives: Cadwalader family Benjamin Chew (paternal great-great-grandfather); William Rawle (great-grandfather); Barnabas Binney (maternal great-great grandfather); Horace Binney (maternal great-grandfather); Horace Binney Wallace (cousin); Horace Binney Sargent (cousin); Edith Wharton (sister-in-law)

Mary Cadwalader Rawle Jones (December 12, 1850 – September 22, 1935) was an American author, socialite, and social leader during the Gilded Age.

== Early life ==
Mary, who was known as Minnie, was born on December 12, 1850, at Powel House, her family home in Philadelphia, Pennsylvania. She was the daughter of William Henry Rawle (1823–1889) and Mary Binney (née Cadwalader) Rawle (1829–1861), both from prominent old Philadelphia families, the Rawles and the Cadwaladers. She had one younger brother, who died young of diphtheria in 1860, around the same time her mother died. Her father, with whom she had a warm relationship, was a prominent attorney in Philadelphia with Rawle & Henderson, a firm founded by her great-grandfather in 1783. When she was eighteen years old, her father remarried to Emily Cadwalader, the daughter of Thomas McCall Cadwalader, her mother's cousin and Mary's own cousin twice removed.

Her paternal grandparents were William Rawle Jr. and Mary Anna (née Tilghman) Rawle, the granddaughter of Chief Justice Benjamin Chew. Her great-grandfather was William Rawle, the U.S. District Attorney in Pennsylvania who was a founder, and first president, of the Historical Society of Pennsylvania, a president of the Pennsylvania Abolition Society, and a trustee of the University of Pennsylvania for 40 years. Her mother was the eldest daughter of John Cadwalader, a U.S. Representative and Federal Judge, and his first wife, Mary (née Binney) Cadwalader, a daughter of Horace Binney, also a U.S. Representative who was known for his public speeches as well as the founding of the Hasty Pudding Club at Harvard.

== Society life ==
In 1892, Mary and her daughter were listed as "Mrs. F.R. Jones" and "Miss Beatrix Jones" in Ward McAllister's "Four Hundred", purported to be an index of New York's best families, published in The New York Times. Conveniently, 400 was the number of people that could fit into Mrs. Astor's ballroom. In her New York Times obituary, it stated:

"She held an unquestioned position in the small circle of men and women who directed New York's society at the close of the last century, and after the letting down of the bars in recent years she continued to be regarded as one of those for whom exclusiveness still had value."

She was known for the artistic salon at her New York home, where she entertained the most prominent authors and artists of the day, including Augustus Saint-Gaudens, John Singer Sargent, novelist Francis Marion Crawford, John LaFarge, and Henry Adams (who considered her and novelist Howard Sturgis his best friends). Minnie was known for her "wider view of the world" than most 19th century women, and her close relationships with men, which she viewed as the "most natural, and even desirable, thing in the world."

== Personal life ==
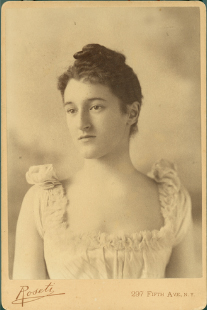
Photograph of Mary's daughter, architect Beatrix Farrand.

On March 24, 1870, she was married to Frederic Rhinelander "Freddy" Jones (1846–1918) in New York City. Jones was the elder son of George Frederic Jones, a joint owner of the family-owned Chemical Bank and a prominent figure in New York real estate, and his wife Lucretia Rhinelander (née Stevens) Jones. His younger sister was famed Pulitzer Prize winning novelist Edith Newbold (née Jones) Wharton, known for her novel The Age of Innocence. Minnie and Freddy lived at 21 East 11th Street, which she retained after their divorce, living there for 50 years in total. Together, they were the parents of one child:

- Beatrix Cadwalader Jones (1872–1959), a prominent landscape architect who in 1913 married Dr. Max Farrand (1869–1945), a Stanford and Yale University historian who served as the first director of the Huntington Library. Max was the brother of Cornell University President Livingston Farrand.

Minnie and Freddy began living apart in 1891, five years before divorcing in 1896, and thereafter was known as Mrs. Cadawalader Jones. Despite their divorce, Minnie remained close friends with her ex-husband's sister Edith. When Freddy died at his residence in Paris in 1918, neither Minnie or Edith mourned him.

On September 22, 1935, en route back to New York City after spending summer at Le Pavillon Colombe, Wharton's home on Rue de Montmorency in Saint-Brice-sous-Forêt, Minnie died of pneumonia in London, England. Edith coordinated the funeral arrangements and she was buried at St John the Baptist Churchyard in Aldbury, Hertfordshire, England, next to fellow writer Mary Augusta Ward.

=== Philanthropy ===
She was active as a volunteer worker at the New York City Hospital School, where she eventually became the chairwoman of the advisory board of the Nursing School.

=== Legacy ===
The Jones' summer home or cottage, known as the Reef Point Estate, in Bar Harbor on Mount Desert Island in Maine. Mary deeded Reef Point to her daughter Beatrix in 1917. After Mary's death in 1935, her daughter and son-in-law turned Reef Point into a horticultural study center.

== Published works ==
- A Book About Fans; The History Of Fans and Fan-Painting (with M. A. Flory), Macmillan & Co., New York, 1895.
- European Travel for Women: Notes and Suggestions, The Macmillan Company, New York, 1900.
- Lantern Slides, Merrymount Press, Boston, 1937.
