= Thomas Cadwalader =

American physician

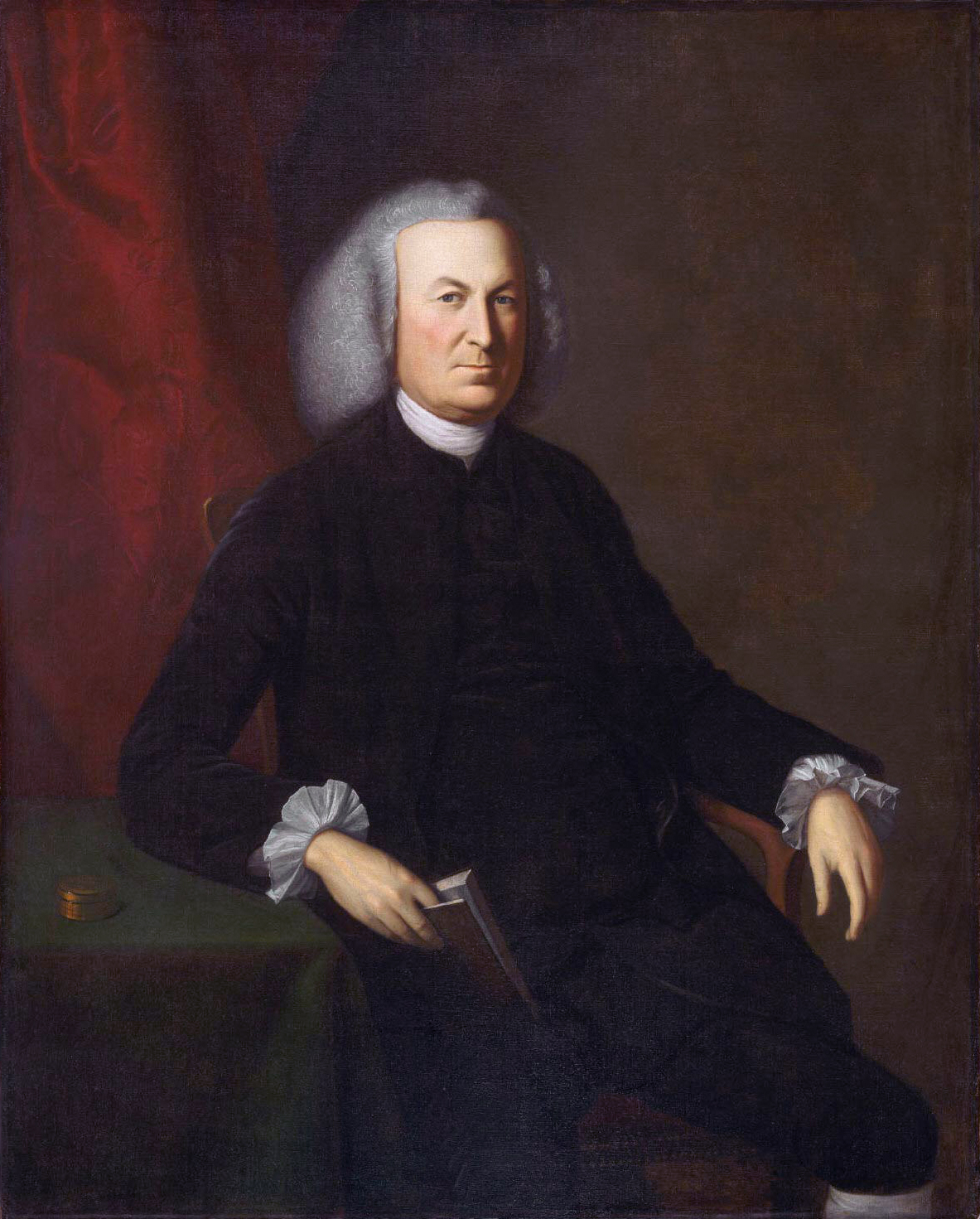
- Portrait of Dr. Cadwalader, by Charles Willson Peale, 1770
- Born: c. 1707; Philadelphia, Pennsylvania, Great Britain
- Died: November 14, 1779 (aged c. 72); Trenton, New Jersey, United States
- Education: Friends Public Schools; Rheims University
- Occupation: Physician
- Spouse: Hannah Lambert (m. 1738)
- Children: John, Lambert, and 6 daughters
- Parent(s): John Cadwalader; Martha Jones
- Relatives: See Cadwalader family

Thomas Cadwalader (c. 1707 – November 14, 1779) was an American physician in Philadelphia, Pennsylvania.

== Early life ==
Cadwalader was born in Philadelphia in c. 1707. He was the only son of four children born of Martha (née Jones) Cadwalader (1679–1747) and John Cadwalader (1677–1734), who was born in Bala, Wales before coming to the Province of Pennsylvania in British America in 1697, seeking a place to practice his Quaker faith.

He was educated at the Friends Public Schools (today known as the William Penn Charter School) in Philadelphia.

== Career ==
After studying medicine with his uncle Dr. Evan Jones, he traveled to London, where he was an understudy of English surgeon William Cheselden. In France, he likely attended lectures at Rheims University.

In 1739, he moved to Trenton, New Jersey, where he served as commissioner of the pleas and peace from 1739 to 1744 and as chief burgess of Trenton from 1746 to 1750. In 1745, his medical essay on "dry-gripes," a condition similar to colic, was published. Before he moved back to Philadelphia, he donated five hundred pounds to Trenton to erect a public library.

After returning to Philadelphia in 1750, he was elected in 1751 to the city's Common Council. He served on Pennsylvania's Provincial Council from 1755 until the Revolution. He was a founder in 1751, and one of the first doctors, at the Pennsylvania Hospital, where he worked until his death.

Dr. Cadwalader was one of the first to inoculate patients against smallpox. He was a founder and director of the Library Company of Philadelphia, and a member of the American Philosophical Society, where he served as vice president from 1769 to 1770.

== Personal life ==
Coat of Arms of Thomas Cadwalader

In June 1738, Thomas married Hannah Lambert (1712–1786), a daughter of Thomas Lambert Jr. and Anne (née Wood) Lambert. Together they had eight children, six daughters and two sons who were both active in the American Revolutionary War:

- Anne Cadwalader, who died in infancy.
- Martha Cadwalader (1739–1791), who married Gen. John Dagworthy in 1774.
- John Cadwalader (1742–1786), who married Elizabeth Lloyd, the daughter of Edward Lloyd and sister of Edward Lloyd IV, in 1768. After her death, he married Williamina Bond, a daughter of Dr. Phineas Bond, and niece of Thomas Bond, in 1779.
- Lambert Cadwalader (1742–1823), who married Mary McCall, the daughter of Archibald and Judith (née Kemble) McCall.
- Mary Cadwalader (1744–1791), who married her cousin Sen. Philemon Dickinson, a younger brother of Founding Father John Dickinson.
- Rebecca Cadwalader (1746–1821), who married Sen. Philemon Dickinson, after the death of her sister Mary.
- Margaret Cadwalader (1748–1820), who married Gen. Samuel Meredith in 1772; he later became the 2nd Treasurer of the United States.
- Elizabeth Cadwalader (1754–1799), who died unmarried.

Cadwalader died on November 14, 1779, at age 72, in Trenton.

=== Descendants ===
Through his daughter Martha, he was a grandfather of Rachael Dagworthy, who married U.S. Senator William H. Wells.

Through his son Lambert, he was posthumously a grandfather of Thomas McCall Cadwalader, who married Maria Charlotte Gouverneur (the sister of Assemblyman Samuel L. Gouverneur and the niece of Elizabeth Kortright and U.S. President James Monroe).

== Legacy ==
Cadwalader Park, in Trenton, New Jersey, was named in his family's honor. The park has an area of nearly 100 acres (0.40 km^{2}), and was designed by Frederick Law Olmsted and built starting in 1887.
