= Lambert Cadwalader =

American politician

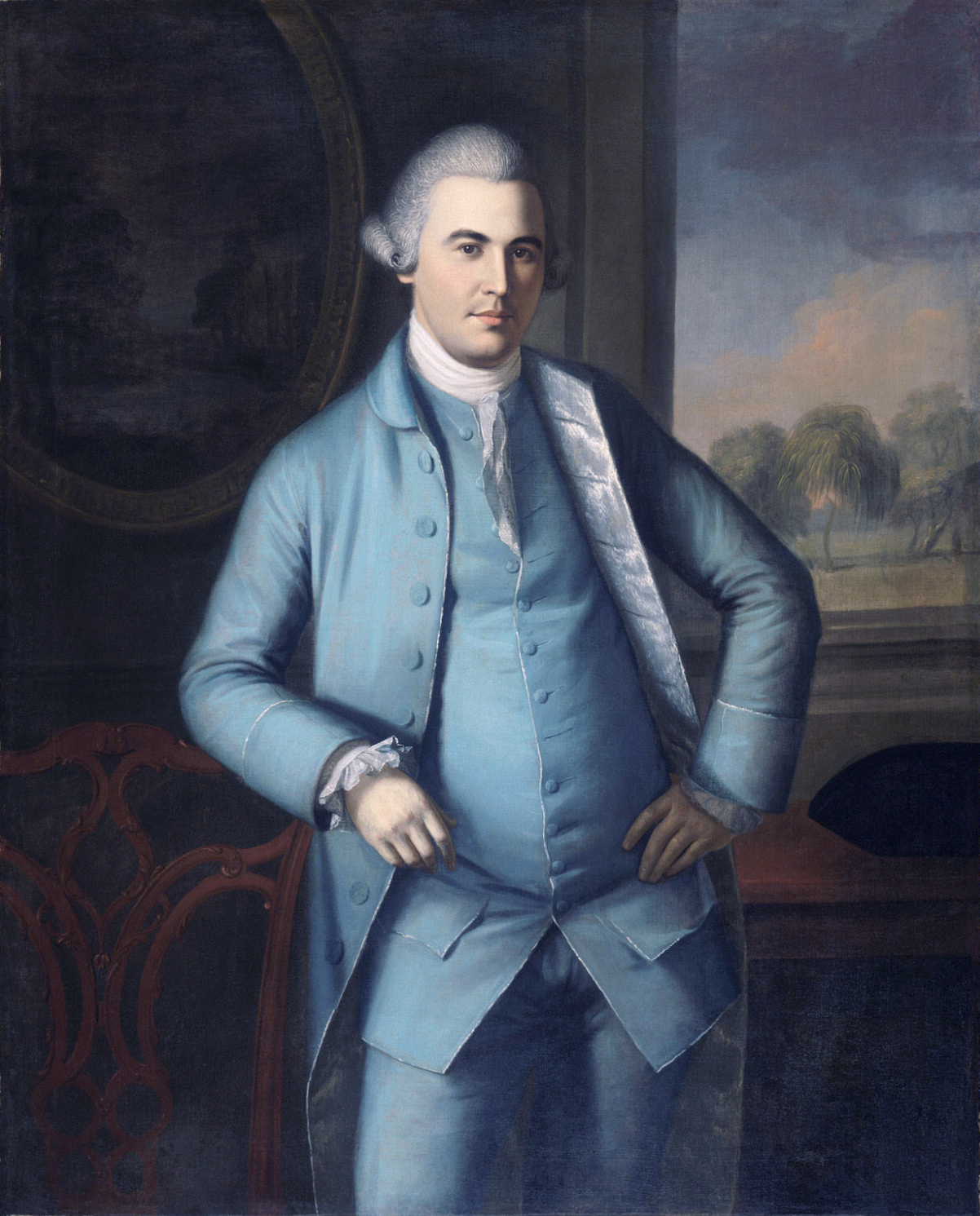
- Portrait by Charles Willson Peale, c. 1771

Member of the U.S. House of Representatives from New Jersey's at-large congressional district
- In office 1793–1795
- Preceded by: Aaron Kitchell
- Succeeded by: Isaac Smith
- In office 1789–1791
- Preceded by: District created
- Succeeded by: Abraham Clark

Personal details
- Born: December 1742 Trenton, Province of New Jersey, British America
- Died: September 13, 1823 (aged 80) Trenton, New Jersey, U.S.
- Resting place: Friends Burying Ground, Trenton, New Jersey
- Spouse: Mary McCall (m. 1793)
- Relations: John Cadwalader (brother)
- Children: Thomas McCall Cadwalader
- Parent(s): Thomas Cadwalader; Hannah Lambert
- Education: University of Pennsylvania

Lambert Cadwalader (December 1742 – September 13, 1823) was an American merchant and leader in New Jersey and Pennsylvania. He fought in the Revolutionary War, then represented New Jersey in the Continental Congress and the U.S. Congress.

== Early life ==
Lambert was born in Trenton, New Jersey, to Doctor Thomas and Hannah (née Lambert) Cadwalader. By 1750, his family had returned to Philadelphia, Pennsylvania, where he attended Dr. Allison's Academy.

In 1757, he entered the College of Philadelphia (later the University of Pennsylvania), but did not graduate. Instead, he went into business with his brother John Cadwalader.

== Career ==
The brothers' business was a success and they became more active in civic affairs, both in Philadelphia and the wider field of the colony of Pennsylvania. They signed the non-importation agreement in 1765, to support the boycott of English merchants. Lambert became a particularly outspoken opponent of the Stamp Act and later measures. In 1768 he was elected to the American Philosophical Society. In 1774, he has elected to the Provincial Assembly, and, in Philadelphia, he was appointed to the city's Committee of Correspondence.

=== Revolutionary years ===
In 1775, Lambert returned again to the colonial Assembly. He also advanced in the militia, and was named captain of one of the companies raised in the city. Then, in the spring of 1776, he played a prominent role in the call for a state Constitutional Convention. He was named as a delegate, but attended only the first few meetings, as military duty called him away.

In January 1776, Cadwalader had been promoted to lieutenant colonel of the 3rd Pennsylvania Battalion of the Continental Army. Late in the summer, he was in New York to aid that city's defense. He began work on building the defenses at Fort Washington in August. After the Battle of Brooklyn, he worked with George Washington to set up defenses on the Brooklyn Heights, but they were forced to withdraw to Manhattan on August 30, because the British had overwhelming numbers.

The 3rd Pennsylvania returned to the defense of Fort Washington. At the beginning of the battle for the Fort, on November 15, Cadwalader was holding the old line on the Harlem Heights. Facing two British regiments, with three more landed to their rear, the Americans were forced to withdraw to the fort. When Colonel Magaw surrendered the fort on the next day, Cadwalader was among those taken prisoner. He was soon released, after giving his parole to British General Howe. Lambert's quick release was partly due to the consideration that his father, Dr. Thomas Cadwalader, had shown to General Richard Prescott as a prisoner of war in Philadelphia in 1776.

Early in 1777, Cadwalader was named colonel and commander of the 3rd Battalion, now called the 4th Pennsylvania Regiment. He declined to take up the assignment because he was on parole and could not serve until exchanged. He was carried on the rolls for almost two years, but a suitable exchange was never arranged. Finally, after officer exchanges broke down, Washington accepted his resignation on January 29, 1777.

When the British occupied Philadelphia in 1777, he withdrew to his father's property near Trenton, New Jersey. This home, called "Greenwood", would be his residence for the rest of his life.

=== Later life ===
In 1784, New Jersey selected him as a delegate to the Continental Congress. He would serve there for the remaining life of that institution, being returned each year until 1787. When the new government was established for the United States, Cadwalader was a Federalist in national politics. He was elected to the U.S. Congress twice, in 1788 and 1792.

Although eligible, Cadwalader did not join The Society of the Cincinnati as an original member when it was established in 1783. He did however qualify for membership and became eligible for representation by a living descendant after the "Rule of 1854" was adopted by the Society as a way to revive the membership.

== Personal life ==
Coat of Arms of Lambert Cadwalader

In 1793, in his early 50s, Cadwalader married Mary McCall (1764–1848), the daughter of Archibald and Judith (née Kemble) McCall. They had one child:

- Thomas McCall Cadwalader (1795–1873), who married Maria Charlotte Gouverneur (1801–1867). Maria was the sister of Samuel Laurence Gouverneur (1799–1865) and the niece of Elizabeth Kortright and U.S. President James Monroe.

He died at Greenwood, in Trenton, Mercer County, New Jersey on September 13, 1823, and is buried in the Friends Burying Ground at Trenton.

U.S. House of Representatives
Preceded by District created	Member of the U.S. House of Representatives from New Jersey's at-large congressional district 1789–1791	Succeeded by Abraham Clark
Preceded by Aaron Kitchell	Member of the U.S. House of Representatives from New Jersey's at-large congressional district 1793–1795	Succeeded by Isaac Smith
