= Thomas McCall Cadwalader =

United States Army general

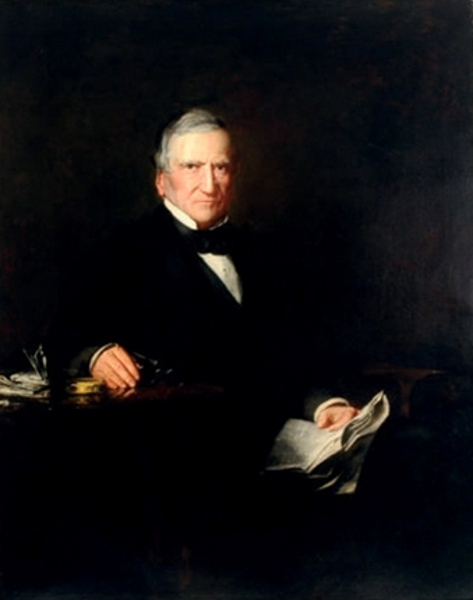
- Susan Macdowell Eakins, General Thomas McCall Cadwalader Seated at a Table, 1882

Personal details
- Born: September 11, 1795 Trenton, New Jersey, US
- Died: October 22, 1873 (aged 78)
- Resting place: Friends Burying Ground; Trenton, New Jersey
- Spouse: Maria Charlotte Gouverneur (m. 1831; died 1867)
- Relations: Gouverneur Cadwalader (grandson)
- Children: 5, including John
- Parent(s): Lambert Cadwalader; Mary McCall
- Education: Princeton University

Military service
- Allegiance: United States
- Years of service: 1830–1858
- Rank: Major general

Thomas McCall Cadwalader (September 11, 1795 – October 22, 1873) was an American who trained to be a lawyer but made his career in the military, retiring as a major general.

== Early life ==
Thomas McCall Cadwalader was born on the family estate called Greenwood in Trenton, New Jersey on September 11, 1795. His father was Lambert Cadwalader and mother was Mary McCall.

Through his mother, he was a descendant of the Schuyler and the Van Cortlandt families through her ancestors Stephanus Van Cortlandt and Gertrude Schuyler. He was their only child, a brother having died in childhood. His cousin Elizabeth Cadwalader (1774–1824) married his uncle Archibald McCall (1767–1843). Many of his cousins once-removed became military leaders, following the footsteps of his father and grandfather.

He graduated from Princeton University and read law, but chose a career in the military instead.

== Career ==
He was appointed deputy adjutant-general of the New Jersey militia on June 2, 1830. On April 10, 1833, he became Aide-de-camp to Elias P. Seeley with rank of lieutenant colonel. On July 30, 1842, he was promoted to brigadier general. In 1856, he toured Europe to report on how the US military could be modernized.

He retired from the military on January 26, 1858. After his retirement he was given an honorary brevet promotion to major general.

== Personal life ==
Coat of Arms of Thomas McCall Cadwalader

On December 27, 1831, Cadwalader married Maria Charlotte Gouverneur, a daughter of Nicholas Gouverneur. Her aunt Elizabeth Kortright had married U.S. President James Monroe, and brother Samuel Laurence Gouverneur had married Monroe's daughter. Together, they were the parents of:

- Emily Cadwalader (1834–1892), married William Henry Rawle on October 17, 1869, after the death of his first wife. (Note: William Henry Rawle's first wife was Emily's cousin Mary Binney Cadwalader. Emily's step-daughter, Mary Cadwalader Rawle (1850–1923) who was also her cousin twice removed, married the brother of Edith Wharton.)
- Mary Cadwalader (1835–1914), who married physician Silas Weir Mitchell (1829–1914) on June 23, 1875.
- John Lambert Cadwalader (1836–1914), who joined a prominent Wall Street law firm, Cadwalader, Wickersham & Taft, that now bears his name.
- Richard McCall Cadwalader (1839–1918), who graduated from Princeton in 1860 and Harvard Law School in 1863 and who married Christine Biddle (1847–1900) on November 26, 1873.
- Maria Cadwalader (c. 1841–1921), who married John Hone (1844–1915) on April 29, 1880. Hone's grandfather was Commodore Matthew Perry and his great-granduncle was New York City Mayor Philip Hone.

Cadwalader died October 22, 1873, and was buried in the Friends Burying Ground at Trenton, New Jersey.

=== Descendants ===
Through his son Richard, he was the grandfather of Richard McCall Cadwalader, who married Emily Margaretta Roebling (1879–1941), (Note: Emily Margaretta Roebling (1879–1941) was the daughter of Charles Gustavus Roebling (1849–1918), whose father John A. Roebling designed the Brooklyn Bridge.) and Gouverneur Cadwalader. Through his daughter Maria, he was the grandfather of Hester Gouverneur Hone-Bartol.

Monroe family tree

Lawrence Kortright (1728–1794)	Hannah Aspinwall (1738–1777)
James Monroe (1758–1831)	Elizabeth Kortright Monroe (1768–1830)	Hester Kortright (1770–1842)	Nicholas Gouverneur (1753–1802)
George Hay (1765–1830)	Eliza Monroe Hay (1786–1840)	Maria Hester Monroe (1802–1850)	Samuel L. Gouverneur (1799–1865)	Maria Charlotte Gouverneur (1801–1867)	Thomas McCall Cadwalader (1795–1873)
John Lambert Cadwalader (1836–1914)
