= Historical Society of Pennsylvania =

Research facility in Philadelphia, US

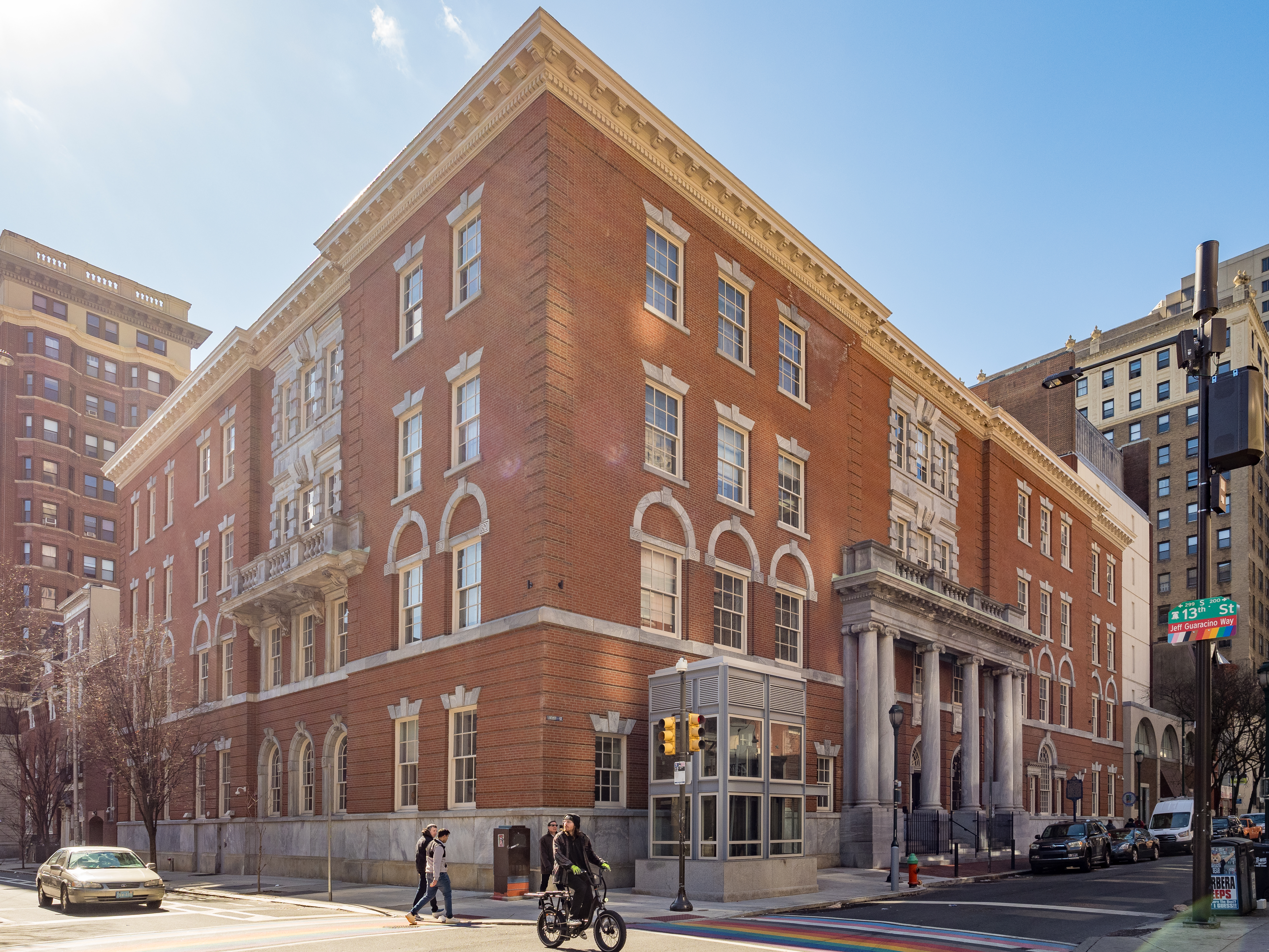
- The Historical Society of Pennsylvania in Center City Philadelphia
- Formation: 1824
- Type: Historical Society
- Headquarters: 1300 Locust Street, Philadelphia, Pennsylvania, U.S. 19107
- President and CEO: David R. Brigham
- Website: hsp.org

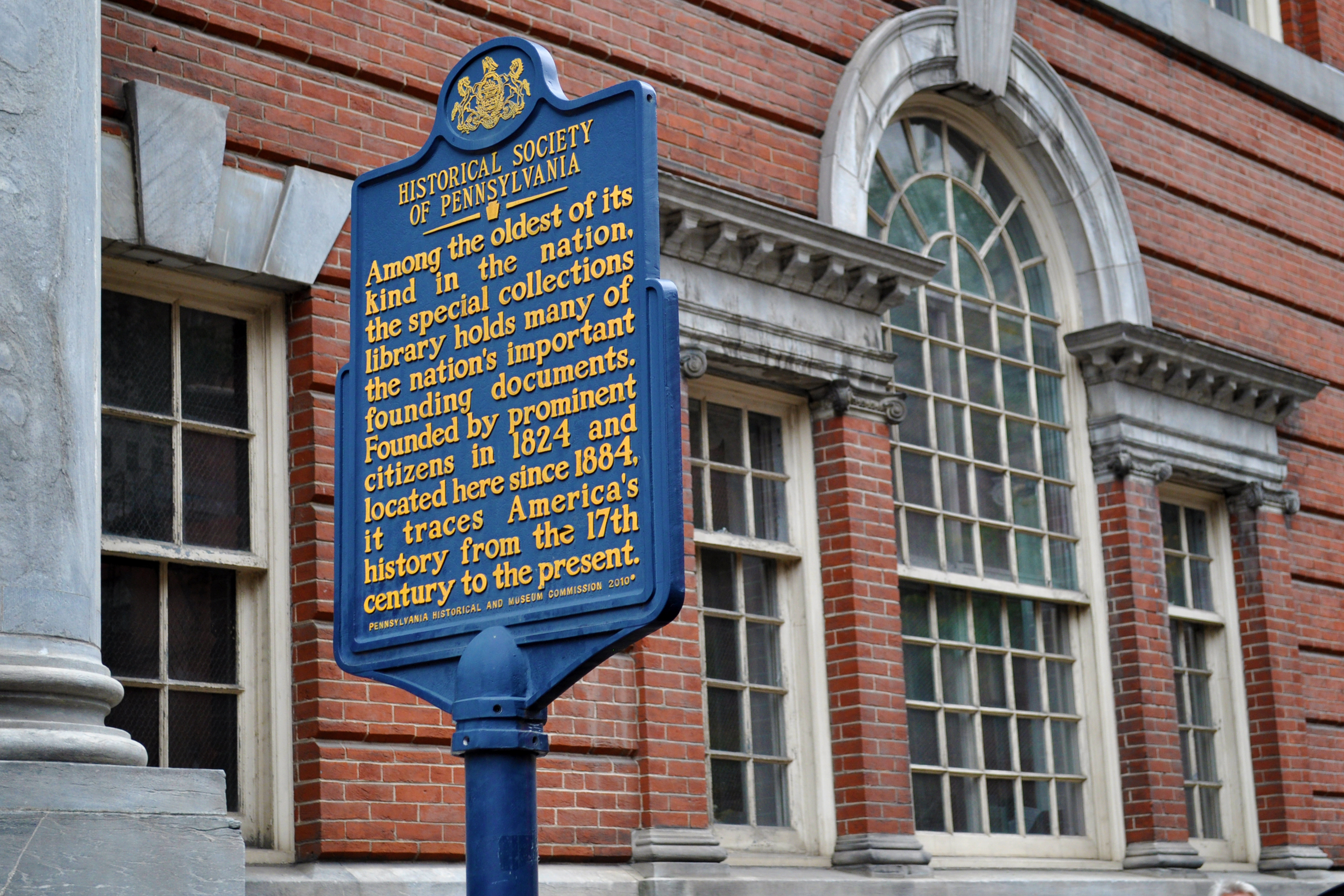
A historical marker for the Historical Society at 1300 Locust Street in Center City Philadelphia

The Historical Society of Pennsylvania is a historic research facility headquartered on Locust Street in Center City Philadelphia. It is a repository for millions of historic items ranging across rare books, scholarly monographs, family chronicles, maps, press reports and varied ephemera, reaching back almost 300 years, and accessible on the society's website.

== Mission ==
The Historical Society of Pennsylvania is an historical society founded in 1824. Membership was regulated by the statutory of the association. Article IV of the statute states that, "the members of the Historical Society of Pennsylvania shall be deemed qualified voters at the meetings and elections, who have subscribed to the Constitution, and who have paid all their dues to the Society".

The society houses some 600,000 printed items and over 19 million manuscript and graphic items. It maintains printed collections on Pennsylvania and regional history and manuscript collections covering 17th, 18th, and 19th-century history. The holdings of the Balch Institute for Ethnic Studies were added in 2002, and those of the Genealogical Society of Pennsylvania in 2006.

The society has recently undertaken efforts to appeal to a younger demographic through its Young Friends programming.

== Building ==
The society's building on the southwest corner of 13th and Locust Streets was formerly the site of the Patterson Mansion. General Robert Patterson, a general of the Mexican-American and Civil Wars, purchased the mansion from John Hare Powel, the founder of the Pennsylvania Agricultural Society.

After Patterson's death in 1881, the Historical Society of Pennsylvania purchased the mansion as its permanent home. The mansion was demolished between 1905 and 1909 and the main block of a new fireproof building, designed by Addison Hutton, was constructed on site. The totally fireproof building was dedicated in 1910. The building is listed on Philadelphia's Register of Historical Places.

== Collections ==
The Society's collections include a number of different types of materials:

- Books and pamphlets: ranging from limited-edition and out-of-print volumes to current reference works and scholarly monographs. The Society's pre-1820 imprints are housed next door at The Library Company of Philadelphia.
- Serials and newspapers: spanning almost 300 years, in either original format or microfilm copy.
- Manuscripts: materials such as letters, diaries, account books, deeds, minutes, and scrapbooks. Manuscript collections include personal papers created by individuals and families, and records created by organizations and businesses.
- Graphics: prints, watercolors, and other works of art on paper, architectural drawings, photographs, broadsides, maps, posters, and other images.
- Printed ephemera: such as event programs, brochures, invitations, advertisements, trade cards, certificates, and menus.
- Microforms: microfilm and microfiche reproductions of newspapers, genealogical resources, manuscript collections, and other materials.

To help researchers find the materials they need, all of these resources are available through the "Online Catalogs and Research Tools" of the society's web site.

== Publications ==
The society publishes Sidelights, a semi-annual newsletter, Pennsylvania Legacies, a semi-annual illustrated history magazine, and the Pennsylvania Magazine of History and Biography, a quarterly scholarly journal published since 1877.

== In popular culture ==
- In May 2016, a play by Ain Gordon, 217 Boxes of Dr. Henry Anonymous, based on Gordon's research as an embedded artist at the Historical Society of Pennsylvania, where John E. Fryer's papers are archived, premiered at the Painted Bride Art Center in Philadelphia. The play explores Fryer and the circumstances around his disguised appearance at the American Psychiatric Association's 1972 convention in Dallas, where he participated as "Dr. Henry Anonymous" in a debate called "Psychiatry: Friend or Foe to the Homosexual?" in a successful attempt to have homosexuality removed from the APA's Diagnostic and Statistical Manual of Mental Disorders, where it was listed as a mental disease. The play uses monologues by three people who knew him: Alfred A. Gross, the New York City-based head of the George W. Henry Foundation, a social charity which helped homosexual men who encountered legal difficulties; Katherine Luder, Fryer's long-time secretary; and Fryer's father, Ercel Ray Fryer.

== See also ==
- List of historical societies in Pennsylvania
