= Uzal Ogden =

American clergyman (1744–1822)

The Reverend Uzal Ogden D.D.
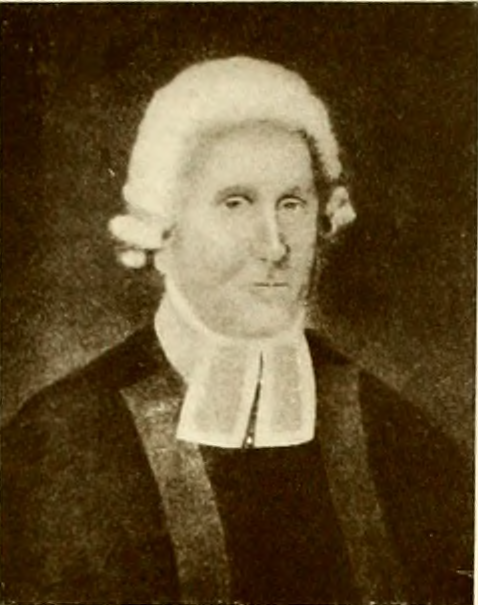
- Church: Presbyterian Church
- Previous post: Rector of Trinity Church (1788-1805)

Orders
- Ordination: September 21, 1773 by Richard Terrick

Personal details
- Born: 1744 Newark, Province of New Jersey
- Died: November 4, 1822 (aged 77–78)
- Spouse: Mary Gouverneur (m. 1776; died 1813)
- Children: 6

Uzal Ogden (1744 – November 4, 1822) was an American clergyman, at first a member of the Episcopal Church and later as a minister of the Presbyterian Church.

== Early life ==
Ogden was born in Newark, New Jersey in 1744. He was the son of Elizabeth Charlotte (née Thébaut) Ogden and Judge Uzal Ogden Sr. (c. 1705-c. 1780), an owner of the Ringwood Iron Works on Sussex County, New Jersey. His older brother, Provincial Congressman Lewis Ogden, married Margaret Gouverneur and his younger brother, Charles Ogden, married Hannah Gouverneur, both sisters of Uzal Jr.'s wife Mary Gouverneur. One of his sisters, Mary Ogden, married Peter Schuyler, son of Philip Schuyler and grandson of Arent Schuyler.

Through his paternal grandfather Capt. David Ogden Jr., he was a direct descendant of colonist John Ogden. His maternal grandfather was Gabriel Lewis Thébaut of the island of Antigua.

Ogden graduated from Princeton University in 1762. He studied theology in Elizabethtown, and then, going abroad, received at the same time both deacon's and priest's orders in the Protestant Episcopal church on 21 September 1773, from Richard Terrick, the bishop of London.

== Career ==
For some years after the beginning of his ministry he labored as a missionary in Sussex County, New Jersey, but after April, 1779, he preached occasionally in Trinity Church in Newark, of which parish he was rector from 1788 till 1805. Meanwhile, he was in 1784-9 one of the assistant ministers of Trinity Church in New York City, and connected with St. John's in Elizabethtown, also preaching at least, once each Sunday in a chapel at what is now Belleville, New Jersey.

In 1798 he was elected the first bishop of New Jersey, but consecration was refused by the general convention in June, 1799, owing to difficulties that, existed between him and his parish. These culminated in 1804, and his suspension was authorized if he persisted in his refusal to resign. In 1805 he became a Presbyterian, but, although he continued active in missionary work, he never thereafter held a charge. The degree of D. D. was conferred on him by Princeton in 1798. He published numerous letters, addresses, sermons, and Antidote to Deism: being an ample refutation of all the objections of Thomas Paine against the Christian religion, as contained in a pamphlet entitled The Age of Reason, addressed to the citizens of these states (2 vols., 1795).

== Personal life ==
In 1766, Ogden was married to Mary Gouverneur (1755–1814), the daughter of Samuel Gouverneur and Experience (née Johnson) Gouverneur. Through her brother Nicholas Gouverneur, a merchant, Mary was the aunt of Samuel L. Gouverneur, who was both nephew and son-in-law to President James Monroe, and Maria Charlotte Gouverneur, the wife of Thomas McCall Cadwalader. Through her sister Gertrude Gouverneur, wife of merchant Peter Kemble, she was the aunt of U.S. Representative Gouverneur Kemble. Together, they were the parents of:

- Nicholas Gouverneur Ogden (1776–1823), who became a business partner of John Jacob Astor.
- Samuel Gouverneur Ogden (1779–1860), who married Eliza Lewis, a granddaughter of Francis Lewis. After her death, he married Julia Fairlie (1808–1862).
- Alida Gouverneur Ogden (1785–1847), who married Rev. Anson Rood (1801–1857).
- Wallace Ogden (1788–1803), who died unmarried.
- Mary Gouverneur Ogden (1792–1860), who died unmarried.
- Margaret E. Ogden (1798–1823), who died unmarried.

Ogden died on November 4, 1822.
