= Nicholas Gouverneur =

President of the Bank of New York
- In office 1799–1802
- Preceded by: Gulian Verplanck
- Succeeded by: Herman LeRoy

Personal details
- Born: 1753 New York City, Province of New York British America
- Died: July 12, 1802 (aged 48–49) New York City, New York, United States
- Spouse: Hester Kortright (m. 1790; died 1802)
- Relations: Abraham Ogden (cousin); Samuel Ogden (cousin); Gouverneur Kemble (nephew)
- Parent(s): Samuel Gouverneur; Experience Johnson

Nicholas Gouverneur (1753 – July 12, 1802) was an American merchant with Gouverneur & Kemble and banker who served as the president of the Bank of New York.

== Early life ==
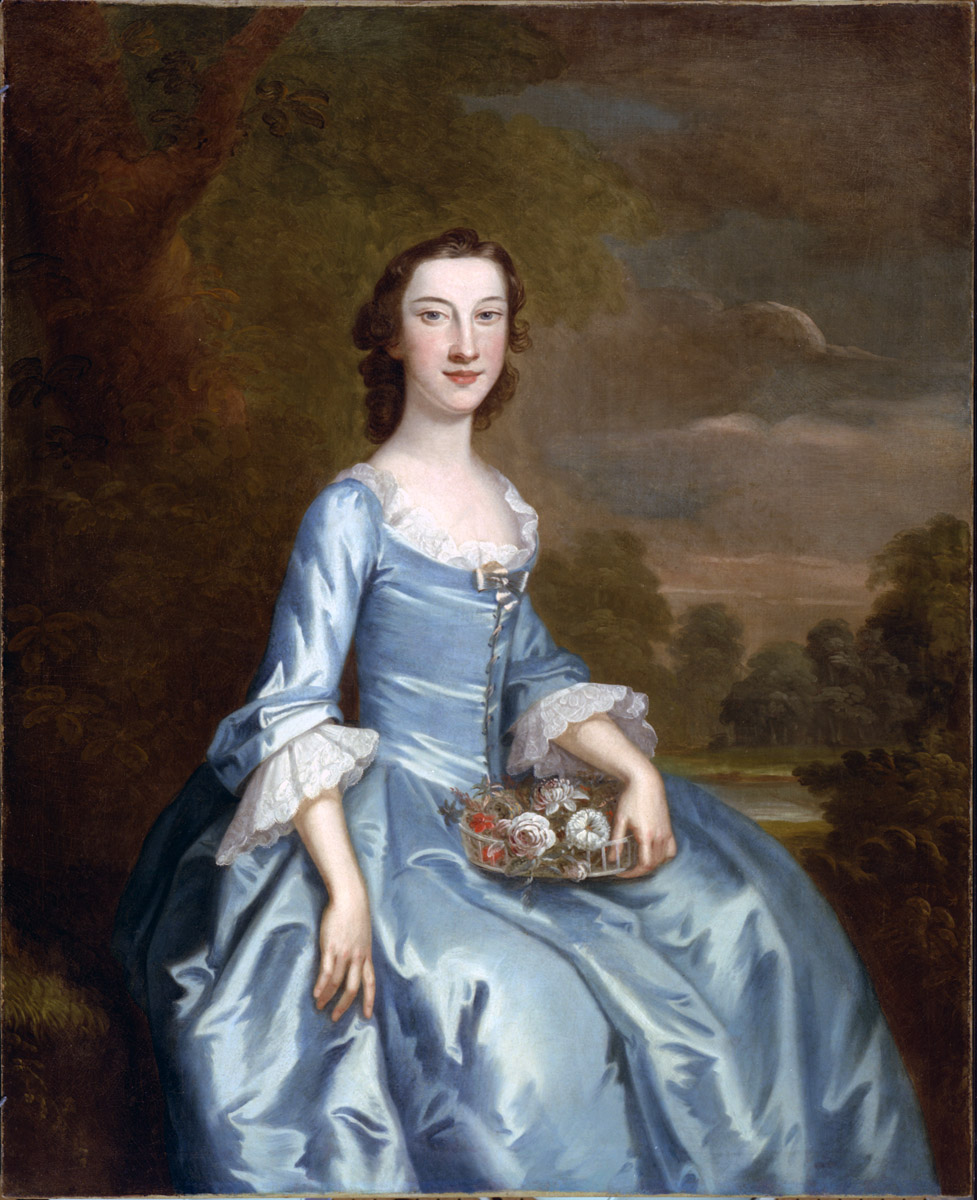
Portrait of his mother, Experience Johnson Gouverneur, by John Wollaston, c. 1750

Gouverneur was born in 1753. He was the son of Samuel Gouverneur (1720–1778), a merchant, and Experience (née Johnson) Gouverneur (1720–1788). Among his siblings were Gertrude Gouverneur (the wife of Peter Kemble Jr.), (Note: His brother-in-law, Peter Kemble Jr. (1739–1823), was the son of merchant Peter Kemble and Gertrude Bayard.) and Margaret Gouverneur (the wife of Lewis Ogden), Hannah Gouverneur (the wife of Charles Ogden), and Mary Gouverneur (the wife of the Rev. Uzal Ogden). Margaret, Hannah, and Mary all married brothers, direct descendants of colonist John Ogden.

His paternal grandparents were Isaac Gouverneur (brother of Speaker of the Assembly Abraham Gouverneur) and Sarah (née Staats) Gouverneur (a daughter of Dr. Samuel Staats and granddaughter of Abraham Staats). Among his extended family was uncle Nicolas Gouverneur, (Note: His uncle, Nicolas Gouverneur (1713–1787), was married to Maria Maytilda Winkler and Sarah Cruger (a sister of Mayor John Cruger Jr. and daughter of Mayor John Cruger).) and aunt Gertrude Gouverneur Ogden (wife of jurist David Ogden), through whom he was a first cousin of Abraham Ogden and Samuel Ogden. Through his sister, Gertrude Gouverneur Kemble, he was uncle to U.S. Representative Gouverneur Kemble and Gertrude Kemble (wife of Secretary of the Navy James Kirke Paulding).

== Career ==
Like his father and grandfather before him, Gouverneur was a prominent merchant. Their firm, Gouverneur & Kemble, conducted trade in the West Indies, Europe and China. It had been founded by his grandfather, Isaac Gouverneur and Peter Kemble, who "were among the foremost merchants in New York".

After the death of Gulian Verplanck in 1799, he was elected to succeed Verplanck as the president of the Bank of New York (which had been founded by Alexander Hamilton and of which Verplanck had been president for eight years). Gouverneur served as president until his own death in July 1802.

== Personal life ==
On February 25, 1790, Gouverneur was married to Hester Kortright (1770–1842), a daughter of wealthy merchant Lawrence Kortright and Hannah (née Aspinwall) Kortright. Among her siblings was the future First Lady Elizabeth Kortright Monroe. Together, they were the parents of three sons and three daughters:

- Nicholas Gouverneur II (1792–1854), who died without issue.
- Isaac Gouverneur (c. 1794–1815), who was killed in a duel by lawyer William Homer Maxwell.
- Louisa Augusta Gouverneur (1795–1860), who married David Johnston Verplanck, editor of the New York American who was the son of Gulian Verplanck, Speaker of the New York Assembly.
- Emily Caroline Gouverneur (1798–1833), who married Robert Livingston Tillotson, New York's secretary of state who was the son of Dr. Thomas Tillotson and Margaret (née Livingston) Tillotson.
- Samuel Laurence Gouverneur (1798–1865), a member of the New York State Assembly who married Maria Hester Monroe, youngest daughter of U.S. president James Monroe.
- Maria Charlotte Gouverneur (1801–1867), who married Gen. Thomas McCall Cadwalader, a son of U.S. representative Lambert Cadwalader.

Gouverneur died on July 12, 1802, in New York. His estate was divided amongst his living children.
