= Samuel L. Gouverneur =

American politician

Postmaster of New York City
- In office November 19, 1828 – July 4, 1836
- Preceded by: Theodorus Bailey
- Succeeded by: Jonathan J. Coddington

Member of the New York State Assembly from New York County
- In office January 1, 1825 – December 31, 1825

Private Secretary to the President
- In office 1820–1825
- President: James Monroe
- Preceded by: Joseph Jones Monroe
- Succeeded by: John Adams II

Personal details
- Born: Samuel Laurence Gouverneur; 1799 New York City, U.S.
- Died: September 29, 1865 (aged 66) Harpers Ferry, West Virginia, U.S.
- Spouses: Maria Hester Monroe (m. 1820; died 1850) Mary Digges Lee (m. 1851)
- Children: 4
- Parent(s): Nicholas Gouverneur; Hester Kortright
- Relatives: Thomas McCall Cadwalader (brother-in-law)
- Education: Columbia College

Samuel Laurence Gouverneur (1799 – September 29, 1865) was a lawyer and civil servant who was both nephew and son-in-law to James Monroe, the fifth president of the United States.

== Early life ==
Gouverneur was born in 1799 in New York City. His father was Nicholas Gouverneur (1753–1802), a merchant with the firm Gouverneur & Kemble. His mother was Hester (née Kortright) Gouverneur (1770–1842), sister of the First Lady Elizabeth Kortright Monroe. His younger sister, Maria Charlotte Gouverneur (1801–1867), was married to Thomas McCall Cadwalader (1795–1873).

His maternal grandparents were Lawrence Kortright, a wealthy merchant, and Hannah (née Aspinwall) Kortright. His paternal grandparents were Samuel Gouverneur (1720–1798) and Experience (née Johnson) Gouverneur (1720–1788). He was a first cousin of U.S. Representative Gouverneur Kemble (1786–1875) through his aunt Gertrude Gouverneur, wife of merchant Peter Kemble.

He graduated from Columbia College in 1817.

== Career ==
In 1824, Gouverneur was elected as a People's Party (faction of the Democratic-Republican party (Note: The "People's Party" or anti-Crawford faction of the Democratic-Republican Party joined forces with the "Clintonians" (supporters of DeWitt Clinton) to oppose the Bucktails faction of the Democratic-Republican Party.)) member of the New York State Assembly, serving in the 48th New York State Legislature in 1825. He was aligned with Assembly Speaker Clarkson Crolius, also from New York County.

On November 19, 1828, he was appointed Postmaster of New York City, succeeding former U.S. Representative and Senator Theodorus Bailey who died in office on September 6, 1828. While in New York he invested in racehorses, and the Bowery Theatre along with James Alexander Hamilton, son of Alexander Hamilton, and Prosper M. Wetmore. Gouverneur served as Postmaster until July 4, 1836, when he was succeeded by Jonathan J. Coddington.

=== Relationship with Monroe ===
Gouverneur served as private secretary to his uncle, the fifth U.S. President James Monroe, who served two consecutive terms from March 4, 1817 until March 4, 1825. (Note: Monroe was Gouverneur's uncle, as he was married to his mother's sister Elizabeth Kortright Monroe.) Gouverneur helped former president Monroe to press his claims to Congress to repay mounting debts. After Elizabeth Monroe's death in 1830, Monroe came to live at the Gouverneurs' home, and died there in 1831. Gouverneur was executor of Monroe's estate, which had to be sold off to pay the debts.

Monroe was buried in the Gouverneur family vault at the New York City Marble Cemetery, until descendants had the remains moved to the James Monroe Tomb in the Hollywood Cemetery in Richmond, Virginia. A ceremony was held at the Gouverneur vault 175 years later, on July 8, 2006.

Monroe's personal papers were left to Gouverneur, who also was asked to support his wife's sister Eliza Monroe Hay (also his cousin, then a widow). Gouverneur started work on publishing the papers or a book on Monroe, but it was never finished. After Mrs. Hay died in 1840, the Gouverneurs moved to Washington, DC where he worked in the consular bureau of the U.S. Department of State from 1844 to 1849. After Congress agreed to buy the papers of President Madison, Gouverneur proposed a similar arrangement, which was concluded in 1850. Some personal papers would be retained for a few generations.

== Personal life ==
On March 9, 1820, Gouverneur was married to Maria Hester Monroe, his first cousin and the daughter of President Monroe. The wedding was officiated by the Rev. William Dickinson Hawley and was the first wedding held in the White House for a child of a president. (Note: The first documented wedding ceremony held in the White House was when Dolley Madison, wife of President James Madison, arranged the wedding of her youngest sister, Lucy Payne Washington, to Supreme Court Justice Thomas Todd in 1812.) (Note: There might have also been a private wedding of Abigail Adams' maid Betsy Howard in 1801.) The wedding was small, with only 42 guests and no cabinet members invited, and General Thomas Jesup served as groomsman for Gouverneur. The couple went on a brief one-week honeymoon, and upon their return, Commodore and Mrs. Stephen Decatur gave them a reception at the Decatur House on May 20, 1820. Another ball was planned, but was cancelled due to Decatur's death two days later in a duel. After moving to New York, the Gouverneur's bought and lived at 63 and 65 Prince Street at Lafayette Street in Manhattan. Together, Samuel and Maria were the parents of four children:

- a daughter, who died in infancy (d. September 4, 1821)
- James Monroe Gouverneur (1822–1885), a deaf-mute who died at the Spring Grove Asylum in Baltimore, Maryland;
- Elizabeth Kortright Gouverneur (1824–1868), who married Dr. Henry Lee Heishell, James M. Bibby, and Colonel G. D. Sparrier.
- Samuel Laurence Gouverneur, Jr. (1826–1880), who married Marian Campbell (1821–1914), and became the first U.S. consul in Fuzhou, China (then spelled Foo Chow).

In 1832, the Gouverneurs' sold their Prince Street residence to Miles R. Burke. (Note: After three years it was owned by John Ferguson and then was sold to Charles H. Contoit in 1873, and then Daniel Mahoney in 1900. On April 28, 1905, a historical plaque was placed on the building in a ceremony with several Monroe descendants in attendance. A crowd of "thousands" included General Frederick Dent Grant and an army attachment. However, by the 1920s the once-elegant pair of houses had fallen into disrepair and were covered in advertisements. A group tried to save one of the houses in the 1920s, but it suffered damage when a move was attempted.) On June 20, 1850, his wife Maria died at the Oak Hill estate, which was sold two years later in 1852.

In September 1851, the widower Gouverneur married Mary Digges Lee (1810–1898), a granddaughter of Thomas Sim Lee (1745–1819). They retired to the Lee estate called "Needwood", near Frederick, Maryland and Harpers Ferry, West Virginia. This stressed family relations during the American Civil War, with Gouverneur associated with the Union government, while his in-laws had deep roots in the Confederate states.

== Death ==
Gouverneur died at his Needwood estate on September 29, 1865. (Note: Other sources say he lived until 1867.) His estate was left to his second wife.

== Family ==
=== Descendants ===
His granddaughter Rose de Chine Gouverneur, born in China in 1860, married Roswell Randall Hoes (1850–1921) and died on May 26, 1933. Their sons Gouverneur Hoes (1889–1943) and Laurence Gouverneur Hoes (1900–1978) established the James Monroe Museum and Memorial Library in the Fredericksburg, Virginia building that housed the James Monroe Law Office, administered by the University of Mary Washington.

Monroe family tree

Lawrence Kortright (1728–1794)	Hannah Aspinwall (1738–1777)
James Monroe (1758–1831)	Elizabeth Kortright Monroe (1768–1830)	Hester Kortright (1770–1842)	Nicholas Gouverneur (1753–1802)
George Hay (1765–1830)	Eliza Monroe Hay (1786–1840)	Maria Hester Monroe (1802–1850)	Samuel L. Gouverneur (1799–1865)	Maria Charlotte Gouverneur (1801–1867)	Thomas McCall Cadwalader (1795–1873)
John Lambert Cadwalader (1836–1914)
