= Maria Hester Monroe Gouverneur =

American president's daughter (1803–1850)

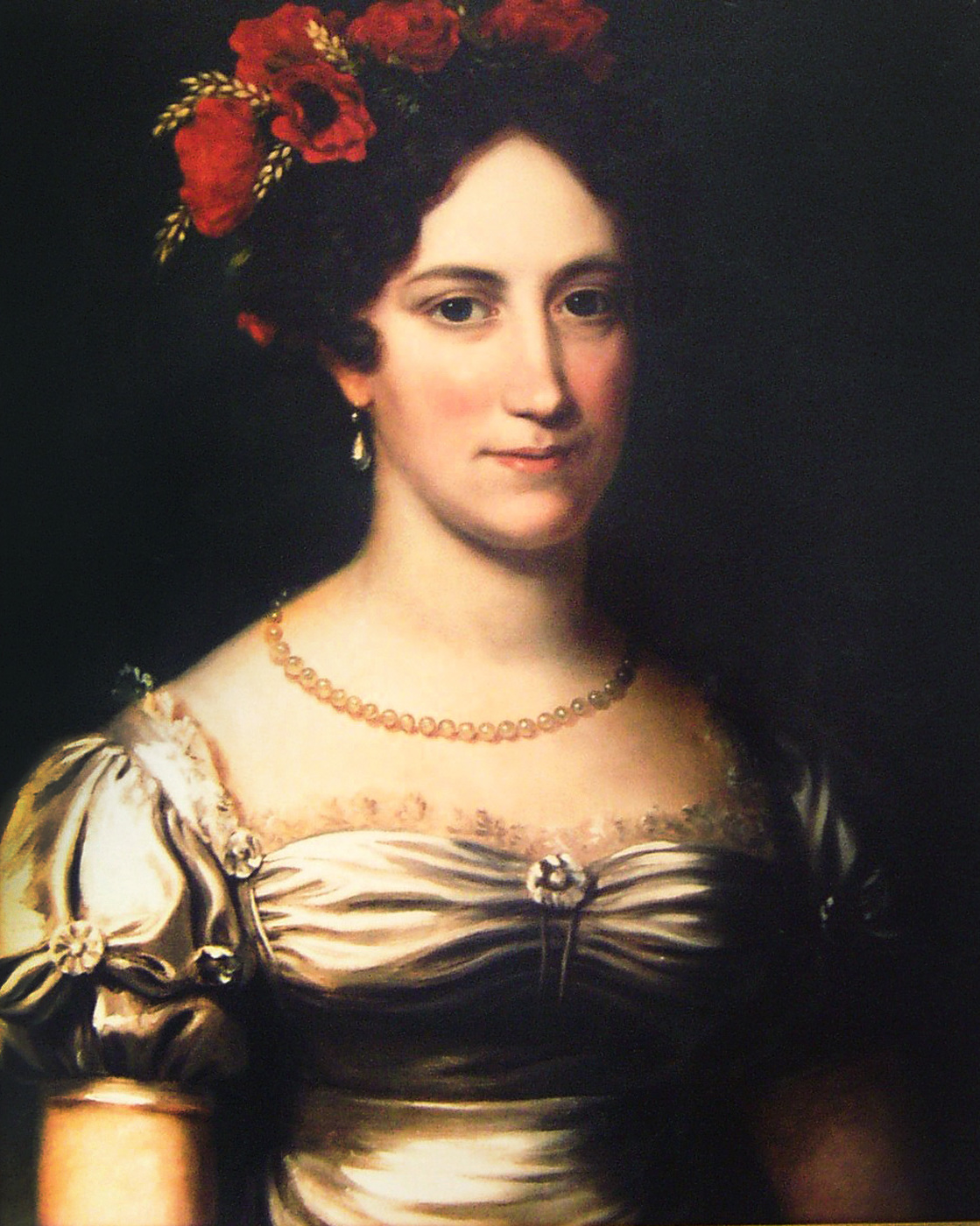
- Born: April 8, 1802; Virginia, U.S.
- Died: June 20, 1850; Oak Hill, Leesburg, Virginia, U.S.
- Spouse: Samuel L. Gouverneur (m. 1820)
- Children: 4
- Parents: James Monroe (father); Elizabeth Monroe (mother)
- Relatives: Eliza Monroe Hay, James Spence Monroe

Maria Hester Monroe Gouverneur (April 8, 1802 – June 20, 1850) was the younger daughter of U.S. President James Monroe. She was the first child of a president to be married in the White House.

== Early life ==
Maria Hester Monroe was the third child of James Monroe and Elizabeth Kortright Monroe. She was born in Virginia on April 8, 1802, during Monroe's first term as Governor of Virginia. When James Monroe was sent to France the next year to assist in the negotiations over the Louisiana Purchase, he brought his family to live with him in France. Maria learned French there, and later in her childhood took a particular interest in the pianoforte. From 1816 to 1819, she was enrolled in Madame Grelaud's French School in Pennsylvania. She was 14 years old when her father became President.

== Marriage ==
Monroe became a popular part of the Washington, D.C., social scene. In 1820, when she was 17, she married 21 year old Samuel Lawrence Gouverneur, son of Nicholas Gouverneur, who was serving as private secretary to her father. They were first cousins; his mother was Elizabeth Monroe's sister. On March 9, 1820, they were married in the White House, in a small ceremony officiated by Reverend William Hawley, with only 42 guests in attendance. The wedding was probably held in the Blue Room (then known as the Elliptical Salon) and the wedding feast was held in the State Dining Room. While it was not the first White House wedding, it was the first time a president's child was married there.

Monroe's older sister, Eliza Monroe Hay, took charge of the wedding. Hay, who acted as an unofficial First Lady during the Monroe presidency, created a social scandal by trimming the guest list and snubbing large portions of Washington society. Complaints even were raised during a cabinet meeting. President Monroe sought the assistance of war hero Commodore Stephen Decatur and his wife Susan Decatur, popular figures in Washington society. They planned a series of lavish balls for the couple at Decatur House to appease complaints. The first one was a success, but the rest were cancelled as the next day Stephen Decatur was killed in a duel.

== New York ==
In 1822, the couple moved to New York City, where Samuel Gouverneur held a series of political posts. They built a two and half story house at 63 Prince Street in New York City. They were popular and threw lavish parties where the champagne flowed freely. After his wife's death in 1830, James Monroe lived with his daughter and her husband in Prince Street, New York City until he died on 4 July 1831.

== Later life and death ==
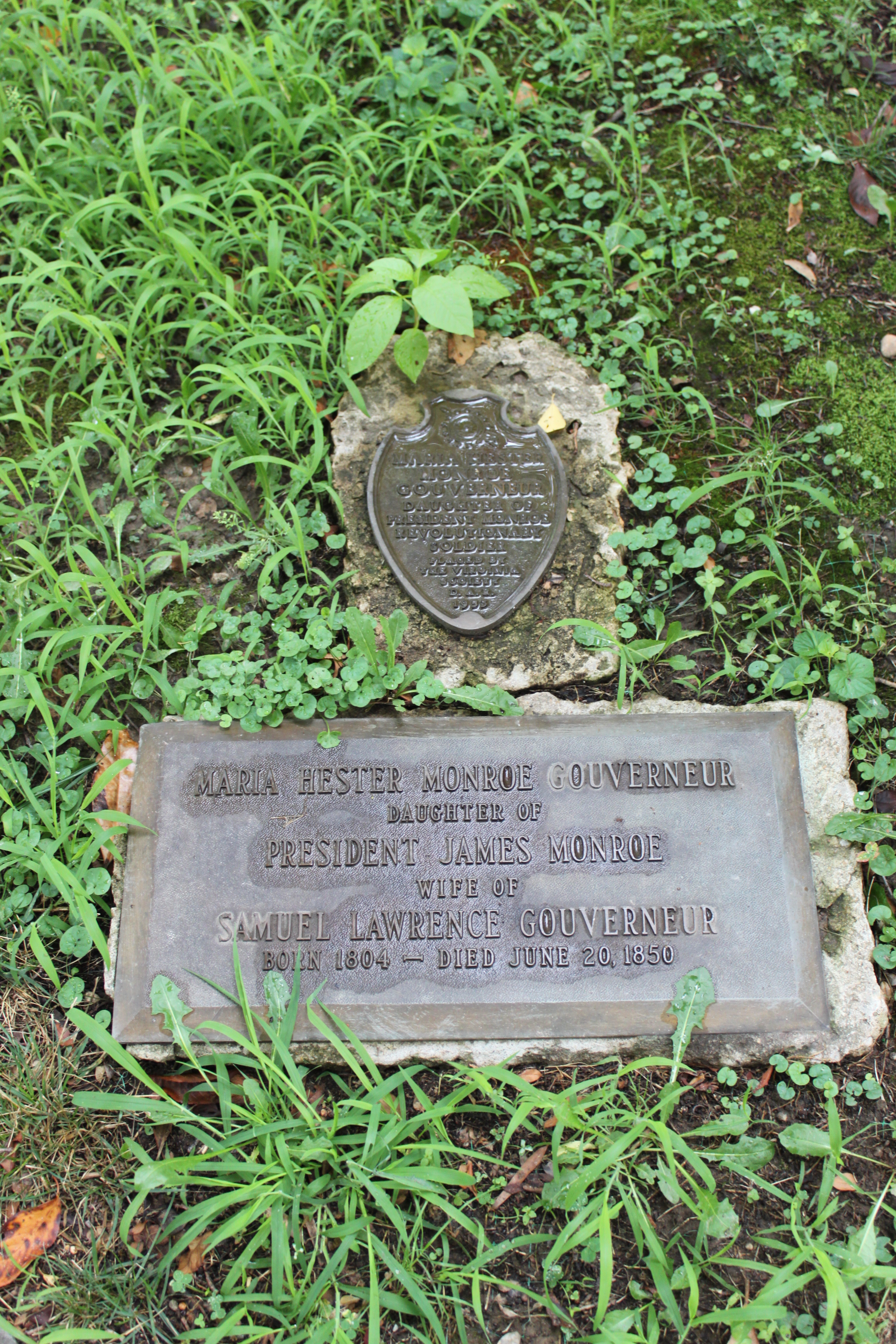
Grave of Gouverneur in Hollywood Cemetery.

In 1840 the couple returned to Washington. Maria Hester Monroe Gouverneur died on June 20, 1850, at the Monroe family Virginia plantation, Oak Hill. Her body was initially interred at Oak Hill but was later moved, along with her mother's remains, to Hollywood Cemetery in Richmond, Virginia.

== Family ==
Maria and Samuel Gouverneur had four children:

- a daughter (d. September 4, 1821), who died in infancy
- James Monroe Gouverneur (1822–1885), who was born a deaf mute. He died at Spring Grove Asylum in Catonsville, Maryland.
- Elizabeth Kortright Gouverneur (1826-1868), who was married three times.
- Samuel Laurence Gouverneur Jr. (1828-1880), who was a United States diplomat.

Monroe family tree

Lawrence Kortright (1728–1794)	Hannah Aspinwall (1738–1777)
James Monroe (1758–1831)	Elizabeth Kortright Monroe (1768–1830)	Hester Kortright (1770–1842)	Nicholas Gouverneur (1753–1802)
George Hay (1765–1830)	Eliza Monroe Hay (1786–1840)	Maria Hester Monroe (1802–1850)	Samuel L. Gouverneur (1799–1865)	Maria Charlotte Gouverneur (1801–1867)	Thomas McCall Cadwalader (1795–1873)
John Lambert Cadwalader (1836–1914)
