= USS Oak Hill =

Two ships of the United States Navy have borne the name USS Oak Hill, in honor of Oak Hill plantation, the estate of James Monroe, the fifth U.S. President, in Loudoun County, Virginia.

- The first, USS Oak Hill (LSD-7), was an Ashland-class dock landing ship, launched in 1943 and struck in 1969.
- The second, USS Oak Hill (LSD-51), is a Harpers Ferry-class dock landing ship, launched in 1994.
