= USS Oak Hill (LSD-51) =

Harpers Ferry-class dock landing ship

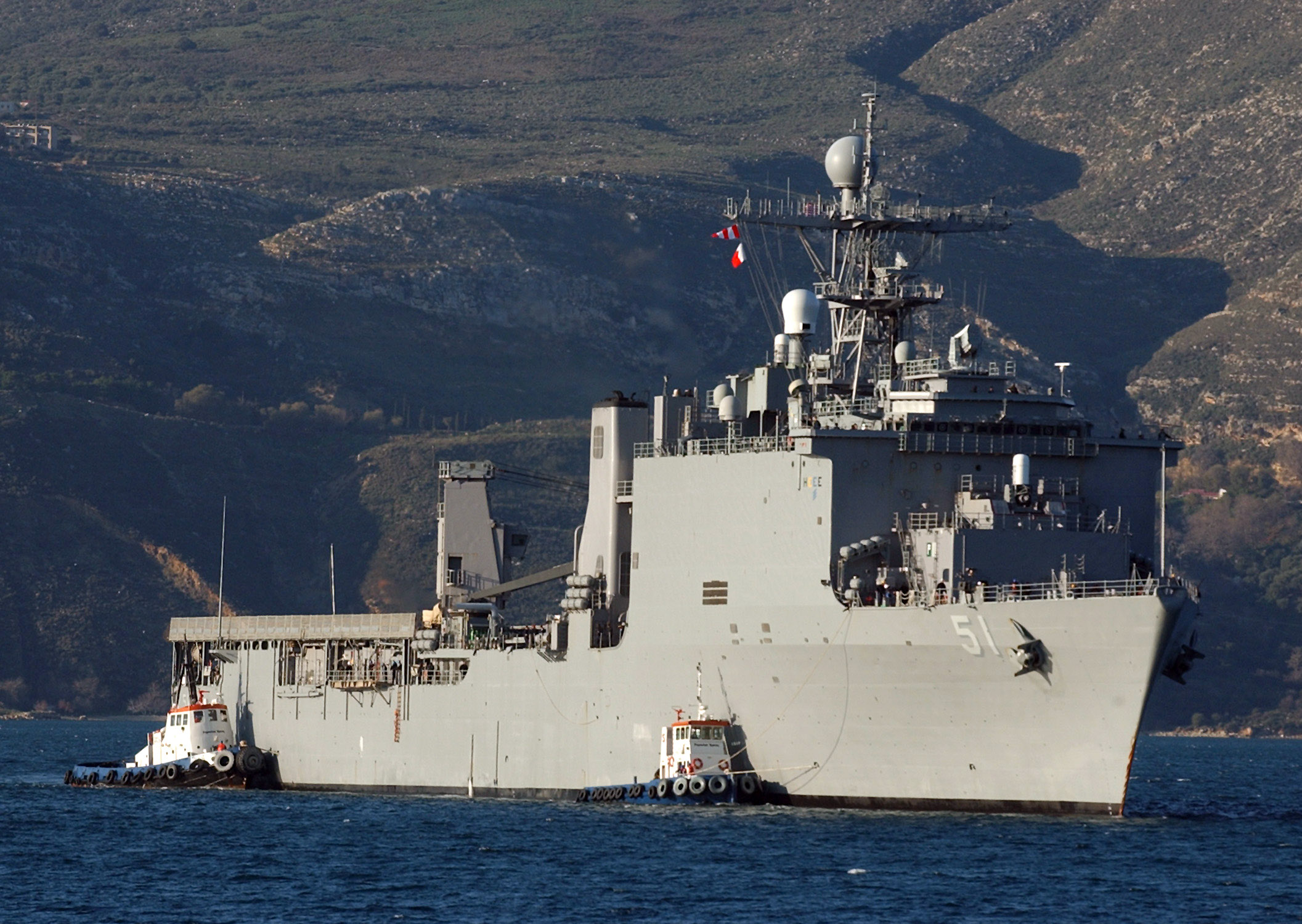
- USS Oak Hill Souda Bay, Crete, Greece, 9 Feb 2006

History

United States
- Name: Oak Hill
- Namesake: Oak Hill in Loudon County, Virginia
- Ordered: 27 March 1991
- Builder: Avondale Shipyard
- Laid down: 21 September 1992
- Launched: 11 June 1994
- Commissioned: 8 June 1996
- Home port: JEB Little Creek, Norfolk, Virginia
- Identification: MMSI number: 368928000; Callsign: NRDE
- Motto: Nations' Protector
- Status: in active service
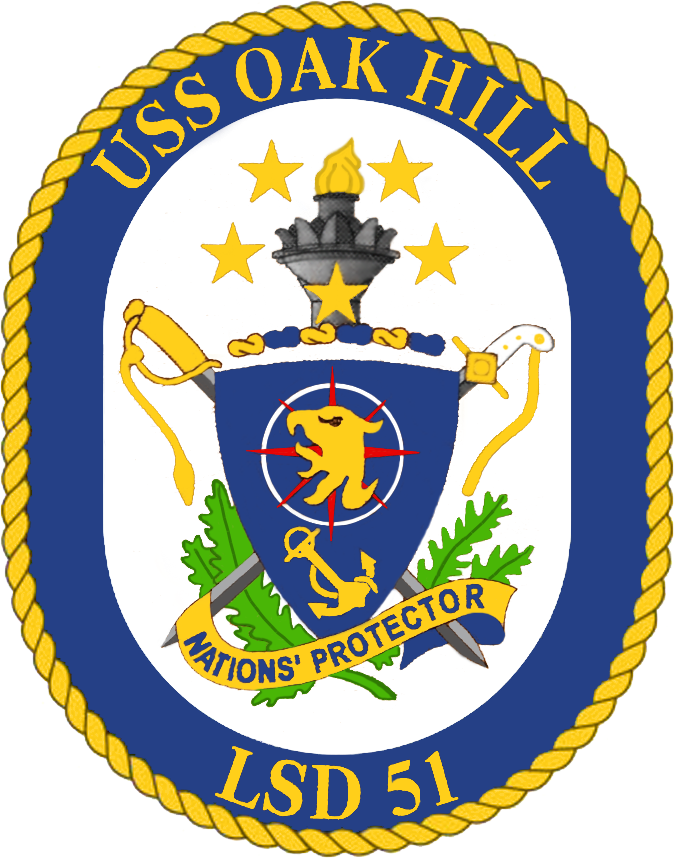
- Badge

General characteristics
- Class & type: Harpers Ferry-class dock landing ship
- Displacement: 12,314 tons (light); 19,600 tons (full)
- Length: 609 ft 7 in (185.80 m)
- Beam: 84 ft (26 m)
- Draft: 21 ft (6.4 m)
- Decks: 12
- Installed power: 4 Fairbanks Morse 12 cylinder opposed piston generators
- Propulsion: 4 Colt Industries, 16-cylinder diesel engines, 2 shafts, 33,000 shp (25,000 kW)
- Speed: over 24.5 knots (45.4 km/h; 28.2 mph)
- Boats & landing craft carried: 2 Landing Craft Air Cushion (LCAC) or 1 Landing Craft Utility (LCU)
- Capacity: 15 amphibious assault vehicles, 2 M1A1 Abrams tanks
- Troops: Marine detachment: 402 + 102 surge
- Complement: 24 officers, 397 enlisted
- Armament: 2 × 25 mm Mk 38 cannons; 2 × 20 mm Phalanx CIWS mounts; 2 × Rolling Airframe Missile; 6 × 0.5 in (12.7 mm) M2HB machine guns

USS Oak Hill (LSD-51) is a Harpers Ferry-class dock landing ship of the United States Navy. She is named in honor of Oak Hill, the residence of James Monroe, the fifth president of the United States. The Monroe Doctrine was penned at Oak Hill, and subsequently delivered at an 1823 congressional address which asserted that the Western Hemisphere was never to be colonized again. This doctrine is the inspiration for the ship's motto: Nations' Protector. Oak Hill is the second ship to honor the residence.

Oak Hill is currently homeported at Little Creek Amphibious Base, Virginia Beach, Virginia, and is assigned to Amphibious Squadron 8.

== Operational history ==
Oak Hill was commissioned on 8 June 1996 and shortly after commissioning, Oak Hill served as command and control ship for the recovery of TWA Flight 800 wreckage.

Her maiden deployment came shortly thereafter (October 1997 to April 1998) and was scheduled to be a cruise to the Mediterranean Sea and Black Sea for a series of exercises, foreign engagements, and port visits. However, near the end of the deployment, the ship was sortied from Alicante, Spain to join the Atlantic and Pacific Amphibious Task Forces into a single force to head to the Northern Arabian Sea and put pressure on the regime in Iraq to cooperate with UN inspectors. After spending time in 5th fleet, Oak Hill headed home in the spring of 1998. Ports visited in her maiden deployment were: Rota, Spain, Operation Bright Star (Egypt), Constanta, Romania, Thessaloniki, Greece, Haifa, Israel, Civitavechia, Italy, Cartegena, Spain, Alicante, Spain, Kuwait City, and Bahrain.

Oak Hill participated in Fleet Week in New York City over Memorial Day 1997.

From February to July 2000 the ship deployed with the USS Wasp Amphibious Readiness Group (ARG) in the Mediterranean Sea in support of the military exercises Dynamic Mix and Noble Shirley. In May 2001 the ship was opened to public tours for Fleet Week at Port Everglades, Florida. From February to August 2002 Oak Hill was sent with the Wasp ARG and the 22nd Marine Expeditionary Unit (MEU) to the Persian Gulf in support of Operation Enduring Freedom.

From January to March 2005 the vessel was sent to the Caribbean Sea as part of the Saipan Expeditionary Strike Group (ESG) in support of a New Horizons humanitarian assistance to Haiti. From January to May 2006, Oak Hill sailed with the destroyer Roosevelt and the cruiser Vicksburg to the Persian Gulf in support of the Global War on Terrorism (GWOT).

From January to July 2007 the ship was a member of the Bataan ESG that sailed to the Horn of Africa in support of the GWOT. In March, the ship was surge deployed to the Horn of Africa to conduct maritime interdiction operations (MIO) in support of the GWOT. This deployment lasted until October 2008. From June to August 2009 Oak Hill sailed to South America in support of the multi-national amphibious exercise, Southern Partnership Station 2009.

On 4 July 2011 the vessel participated in Independence Day activities in Boston with USS Constitution, through public tours, ceremonial guard, and training. From October to December that year, the ship traveled to South America to take part in the multi-national amphibious exercise, Southern Partnership Station 2011 and Anti-Trafficking operations and seized over 4 tons of cocaine.

In May 2014, Oak Hill was designated the flagship for New York Fleet Week at Pier 92 in Manhattan. In September, the ship was designated the flagship for the "Star Spangled Celebration" (bicentennial celebration of the War of 1812) at Inner Harbor, Baltimore, Maryland. In October the ship participated in Operation Bold Alligator 2014.

From May to September 2015 Oak Hill completed pre-deployment certification operations with the Kearsarge ARG. From October 2015 to May 2016 the ship deployed with Arlington and Kearsarge as part of the Kearsarge ARG to 6th Fleet and 5th Fleet areas of responsibility in support of Operation Freedom's Sentinel.

In June 2016 the ship completed surge deployment to 4th Fleet area of responsibility in support of the Panama Canal Expansion Ceremony. In August 2016 Oak Hill made a guest ship visit to Rockland, Maine in support of Annual Rockland Main Lobster Festival.

Oak Hill was deployed to the Texas coastline to assist with recovery from Hurricane Harvey. When Hurricane Irma threatened the US Virgin Islands and Puerto Rico, it was sent along with Kearsarge to assist there instead, and was then on station in Puerto Rico to assist with recovery from Hurricane Maria.

In December 2020 the U.S. Navy's Report to Congress on the Annual Long-Range Plan for Construction of Naval Vessels stated that the ship was planned to be placed Out of Commission in Reserve in 2025.

== Coat of arms ==
=== Shield ===
The dark blue and gold represent the U.S. Navy. The eagle's head, derived from the coat of arms of the Monroe family, represents both the heritage of the home Oak Hill for which the ship is named, and also the United States. The compass rose symbolizes navigation and a world-wide scope of operations. The anchor represents the trials and tribulations in the life of a sailor. A fouled anchor is the worst enemy. Gold stands for excellence, red for courage and sacrifice, and white for integrity.

=== Crest ===
The torch, derived from the Statue of Liberty's torch, symbolizes freedom, and also refers to the protection denoted in the ship's motto. The gold mullets record the five Battle Stars awarded to the first USS OAK HILL (LSD 7) for service in World War II. Gold signifies excellence.

=== Supporters ===
The crossed Navy and Marine Corps officer swords symbolizes the ship's united mission with the United States Marine Corps in amphibious operations.

=== Motto ===
"Nations' Protector" is a nod to the Monroe Doctrine. "Oak Hill" was the homeplace of James Monroe in Virginia.
