= Eliza Monroe Hay =

American socialite

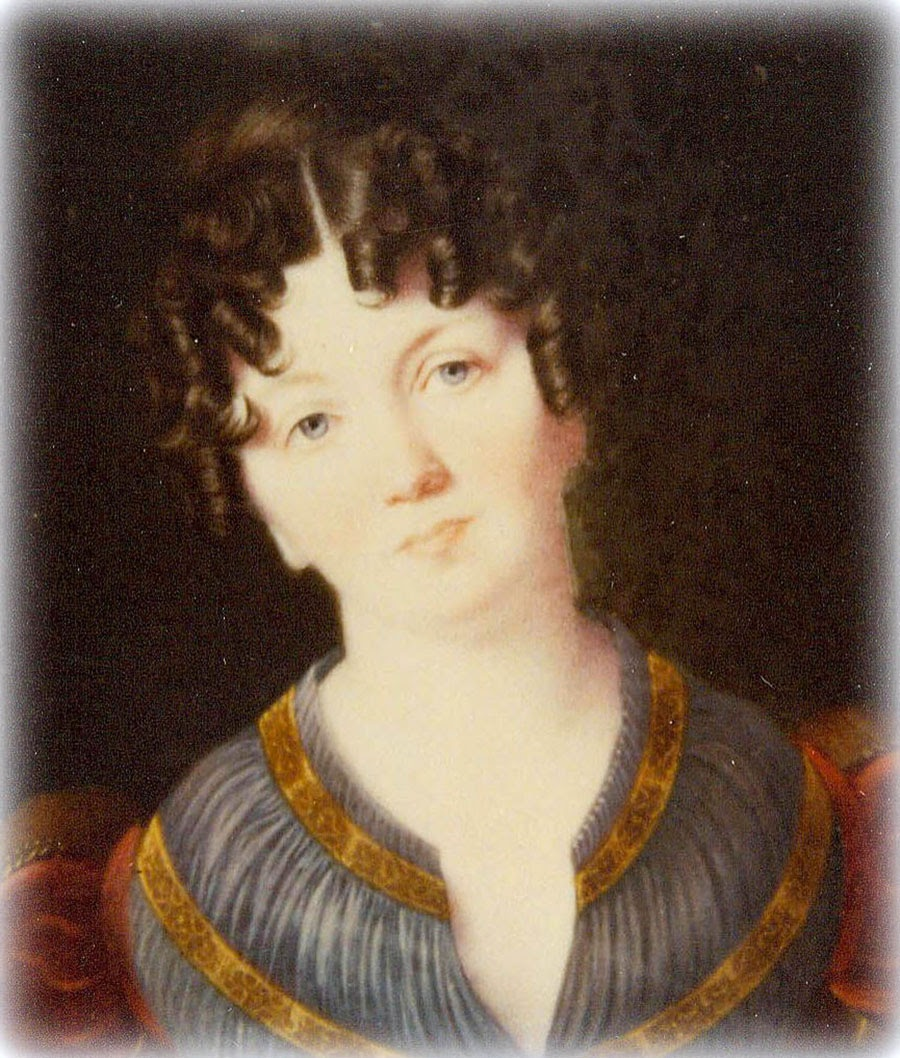
- portrait of Eliza Hay in the James Monroe Museum
- Born: Elizabeth Kortright Monroe; December 1786; Fredericksburg, Virginia, U.S.
- Died: January 27, 1840 (aged 53); Paris, France
- Burial place: Hollywood Cemetery, Richmond, Virginia, U.S.
- Known for: Acting as First Lady
- Spouse: George Hay (m. 1808; died 1830)
- Children: 1
- Parent(s): James Monroe; Elizabeth Monroe
- Relatives: Maria Hester Monroe Gouverneur (sister)

Elizabeth Kortright Monroe Hay (née Monroe; December 1786 – January 27, 1840) was an American socialite who acted as unofficial First Lady during her father James Monroe's presidency, as her mother's health kept her away from many White House duties. She was married to prominent attorney George Hay.

== Early life and marriage ==
Elizabeth “Eliza” Kortright Monroe was born to James Monroe and Elizabeth Monroe (née Kortright) in December 1786 in Virginia. She spent much of her childhood in Paris during the French Revolution, when her father was the American minister to France. She attended school at Maison d'éducation de la Légion d'honneur, the school set up by Henriette Campan, a former lady-in-waiting to Marie Antoinette. While at the school, Hay "befriended many women of European royal families," including Hortense de Beauharnais, daughter of Josephine de Beauharnais and future mother of Napoleon III.

In 1803, at the age of 17, Hay returned with her family to the United States. By then, she was fluent in both French and English. In 1808, at the age of 22, she married attorney and judge George Hay, who was from Virginia.

== Monroe presidency ==
James Monroe assumed the presidency in 1817, when Hay was 31. During his administration, she often acted as unofficial First Lady when her mother was ill. Hay was "primarily remembered for her domineering style and insistence that every iota of protocol be followed." Her "influence over her father was marked." She was also rumored to be snobbish, difficult to work with, and to have "an already high opinion of herself." Louisa Adams described her as "so accomplished and ill bred," "so proud and mean" and as having "such a love for scandal that no reputation is safe in her hands." In the book Executive Privilege: Two Centuries of White House Scandals, writer Jack Mitchell refers to Hay as a snob and "a bit of a society bitch."

Hay and her husband had a daughter Hortensia, whose godmother was her mother's close friend Hortense de Beauharnais. Hortense, by then Queen Consort of the Netherlands, would send Hortensia presents, including oil portraits of herself, her brother Eugene, and Henriette Campan. The friendship with Hortense did not afford Hay an invitation to a ball at Caroline Bonaparte's Château de Neuilly, as "the sister of an Emperor could not be expected to receive the daughter of an honest republican." Hortensia married Lloyd Nicholas Rogers of Baltimore as his second wife, with whom she had three daughters. Hortensia died before her mother, after which, Hay helped raise her own grandchildren.

== Return to Paris ==
On September 21, 1830, Hay's husband George died, followed by her mother Elizabeth two days later. Her father James died less than a year later, on July 4, 1831. Following this string of deaths, Hay moved back to Paris, where she converted to Catholicism and joined a convent.

While she was living in Paris, Hay wrote to Louis Philippe I, then King of the French, and a friend of her family, asking for a room in his palace, writing that, according to The Washington Post, America provided no aid for the children of its rulers. Additionally, Pope Gregory XVI sent her a bracelet during this time that he had blessed. The bracelet was "French silver-gilt, with a cameo setting of the head of Christ."

In another later dating to her time in Paris, Hay wrote an unsent letter addressed to an unknown person in the court of the czar of Russia. In it, she claimed to have been swindled by Samuel Gouverneur, her brother-in-law, writing of "a very black business & one from which a deep stain will be fixed on his honor." The historian who discovered the letter in the U.S. National Archives hypothesized that Gouverneur, with whom Hay had a poor relationship, had intentionally delayed the sale of Monroe's Presidential papers, the proceeds from which Hay had assumed she would receive in her lifetime.

== Death and repatriation ==
Hay died in Paris on January 27, 1840, and was buried in the Père Lachaise Cemetery. Her burial was arranged by the then U.S. consul general in Paris, Daniel Brent. In May 2025, following the two-year long project led by retired schoolteacher Barbara Vorndick, with the assistance of Virginia state senator Bryce Reeves, and the American Embassy in Paris, Hay's remains were repatriated to the United States to be reburied in the Hollywood Cemetery in Richmond, Virginia, alongside her father, mother, and sister. Hay was buried on October 23, 2025, in a Catholic reinterment service performed by the Diocese of Richmond.

Monroe family tree

Lawrence Kortright (1728–1794)	Hannah Aspinwall (1738–1777)
James Monroe (1758–1831)	Elizabeth Kortright Monroe (1768–1830)	Hester Kortright (1770–1842)	Nicholas Gouverneur (1753–1802)
George Hay (1765–1830)	Eliza Monroe Hay (1786–1840)	Maria Hester Monroe (1802–1850)	Samuel L. Gouverneur (1799–1865)	Maria Charlotte Gouverneur (1801–1867)	Thomas McCall Cadwalader (1795–1873)
John Lambert Cadwalader (1836–1914)
