= Margaret Kemble Gage =

Wife of General Thomas Gage (1734–1824)

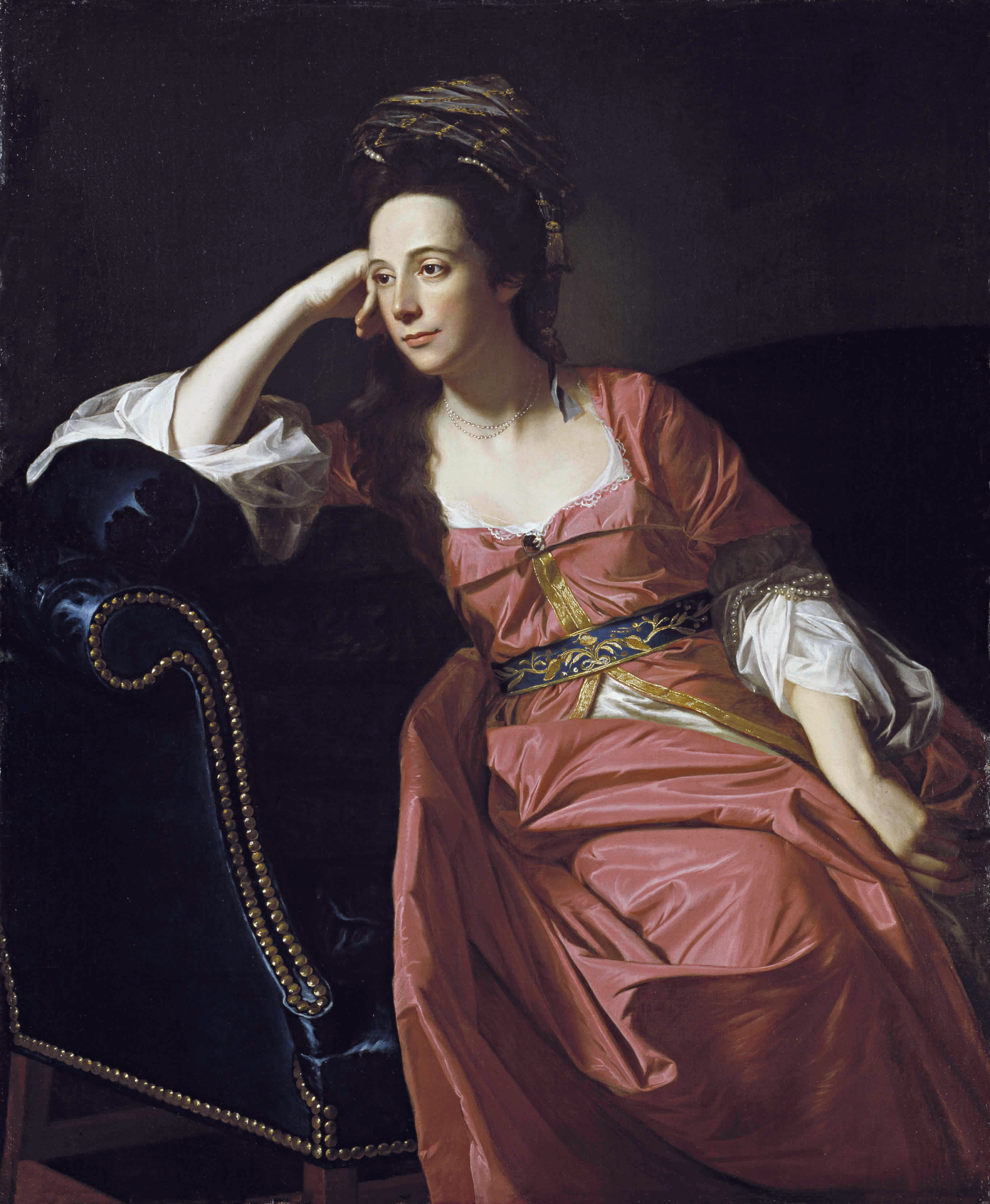
- Mrs. Thomas Gage. Portrait of Gage in the Turquerie style, circa 1771, by John Singleton Copley. This portrait is in the Timken Museum of Art in San Diego, California.
- Born: Margaret Kemble; 1734; New Brunswick, Province of New Jersey
- Died: 1824 (aged 89–90); England
- Spouse: Thomas Gage (m. 1758; died 1787)
- Children: 11, including Henry
- Father: Peter Kemble
- Relatives: Stephanus Van Cortlandt (great-grandfather)

Margaret Kemble Gage (1734–1824) was the wife of General Thomas Gage, who led the British Army in Massachusetts in the American Revolutionary War.

== Family life and descendants ==
Margaret Kemble was born in New Brunswick, Province of New Jersey, and lived in East Brunswick Township. She was the daughter of Peter Kemble, a wealthy New Jersey businessman and politician, and Gertrude Bayard; the granddaughter of Judge Samuel Bayard (b. 1669) and Margaretta Van Cortlandt (b. 1674); and the great-granddaughter of Mayor of New York City Stephanus Van Cortlandt and Gertrude Schuyler. Through her mother, she was a first cousin to the Van Cortlandts, de Lanceys, and the Van Rensselaers. She married Thomas Gage on December 8, 1758, at her father's 1200-acre Mount Kemble Plantation in New Jersey.

Following the outbreak of the American Revolution, Kemble Gage sailed from Boston to England in the summer of 1776 on a ship carrying military widows, orphans, and 170 soldiers who had been badly wounded in the Battle of Bunker Hill. She was joined by her husband a few months later, who was recalled after his failure to resolve divisions with the colonists. Together with their children, the couple settled in a Portland Place address in London. There are accounts that cite how Kemble Gage's relationship with her husband was never the same again.

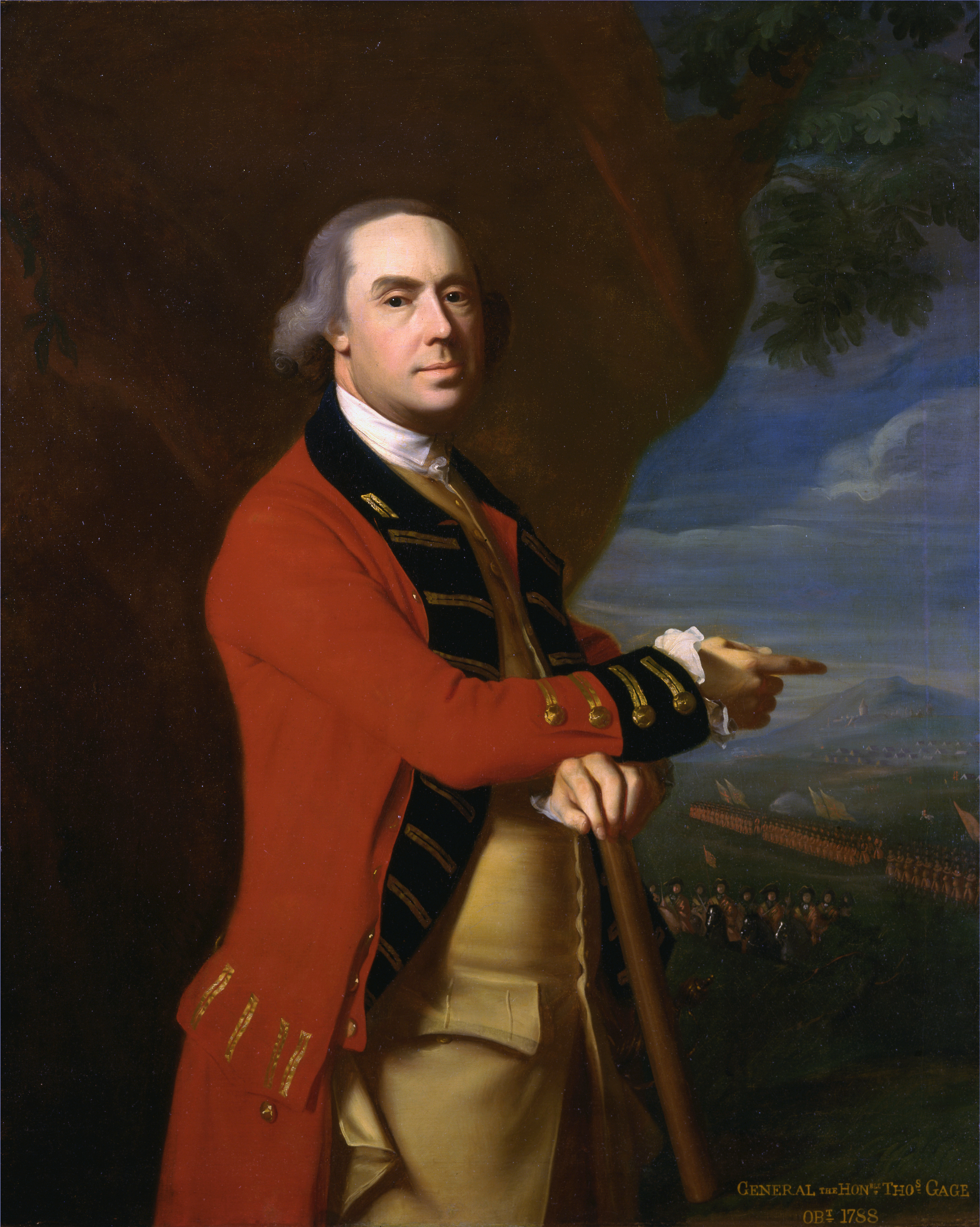
Portrait of Thomas Gage by John Singleton Copley, 1768

Margaret outlived Thomas Gage by 36 years. The couple had eleven children, and their first son, the future 3rd Viscount Gage, was born in Montreal in 1761. Gage's daughter, Charlotte Margaret Gage, married Admiral Sir Charles Ogle.

Descendants of Kemble Gage include:

- Lieutenant General Sir John Paul Foley (1939) retired British general
- Henry Hodgetts-Foley (1828–1894) former member of Parliament
- Montagu Bertie, 6th Earl of Abingdon (1808–1884) British peer and politician
- John Vereker, 6th Viscount Gort (1886–1946) British military officer and commander of the British Expeditionary Forces in Europe during World War II up to the Battle of Dunkirk.
- Olivia Llewellyn (1980–) British actress
- Arabella Dominica Llewellyn (1983–)
- Gabriella Wilde (1989–) English model and actress
- Octavia Calthorpe cinematographer

Her brother, Stephen Kemble, was a lieutenant-colonel in the British Army during the Revolution.

She died in England in 1824. She was portrayed by Emily Berrington in the television miniseries Sons of Liberty.

== Role in American Revolution ==
Some historians have used circumstantial evidence to suggest that Kemble Gage played a key role in the lead-up to the first battle of the American Revolution (the Battle of Lexington and Concord).

Prior to the battle, the Sons of Liberty observed British troops in Boston preparing for action. Joseph Warren, one of the key leaders of the Sons of Liberty, learned from a confidential informer, well-connected to the British high command, "intelligence of their whole design...to arrest Samuel Adams and John Hancock, who were known to be at Lexington, and burn the colonists' military stores at Concord."

Warren, after learning of the plan, dispatched Paul Revere and William Dawes, which set off a chain reaction of alarm riders across Massachusetts and into adjoining colonies. Instead of a quiet night mission, the British troops were opposed by thousands of wide-awake, angry, armed colonists. Kemble Gage's husband, the British Commander-in-Chief, had intended to prevent a war, but was forced to send an additional 1,000 units to safely return the British force to Boston.

Warren's informant remains unknown, as two months later, he was killed during the Battle of Bunker Hill. Though the evidence is circumstantial, some historians strongly suspect that the informant was Margaret Kemble Gage. She was an American, and her family's prestige and wealth lent her social standing equal to that of her husband, whose officers were even known to call her "Duchess". She did not make a secret of her divided loyalties and said that "she hoped her husband would never be the instrument of sacrificing the lives of her countrymen".

General Gage stated later that he had only told two people of the plan, which was to be kept a "profound secret": his second-in-command, and one other person. Some of the other top British officers suspected that that other person was Margaret. Before the engagements at Lexington and Concord, General Gage had been known as a devoted husband, but in the following summer, Kemble Gage sailed to England at least temporarily without him.

However, more recently, historians have expressed doubt on Kemble Gage's role. For one, Kemble Gage went on to have two more children with Gage when they reunited, indicating their relationship remained close. Moreover, tracing insider statements and vital records have led to the identification of another potential suspect, Bostonian cutler William Jasper.

== See also ==
- Intelligence in the American Revolutionary War
- Intelligence operations in the American Revolutionary War

== Sources ==
- Wise, S.F. (1979). "Gage, Thomas". In Halpenny, Francess G. (ed.). Dictionary of Canadian Biography. Vol. IV (1771–1800) (online ed.). University of Toronto Press.
- Kemble, Stephen (1885). Collections of the New York Historical Society for the Year 1884. New York: New York Historical Society.
- Fischer, David Hackett (1994). Paul Revere's Ride. New York: Oxford University Press. ISBN 978-0195098310.
- Bell, J. L. (April 18, 2024). "Dr. Warren's Crucial Informant". Journal of the American Revolution.
