= USS Oak Hill (LSD-7) =

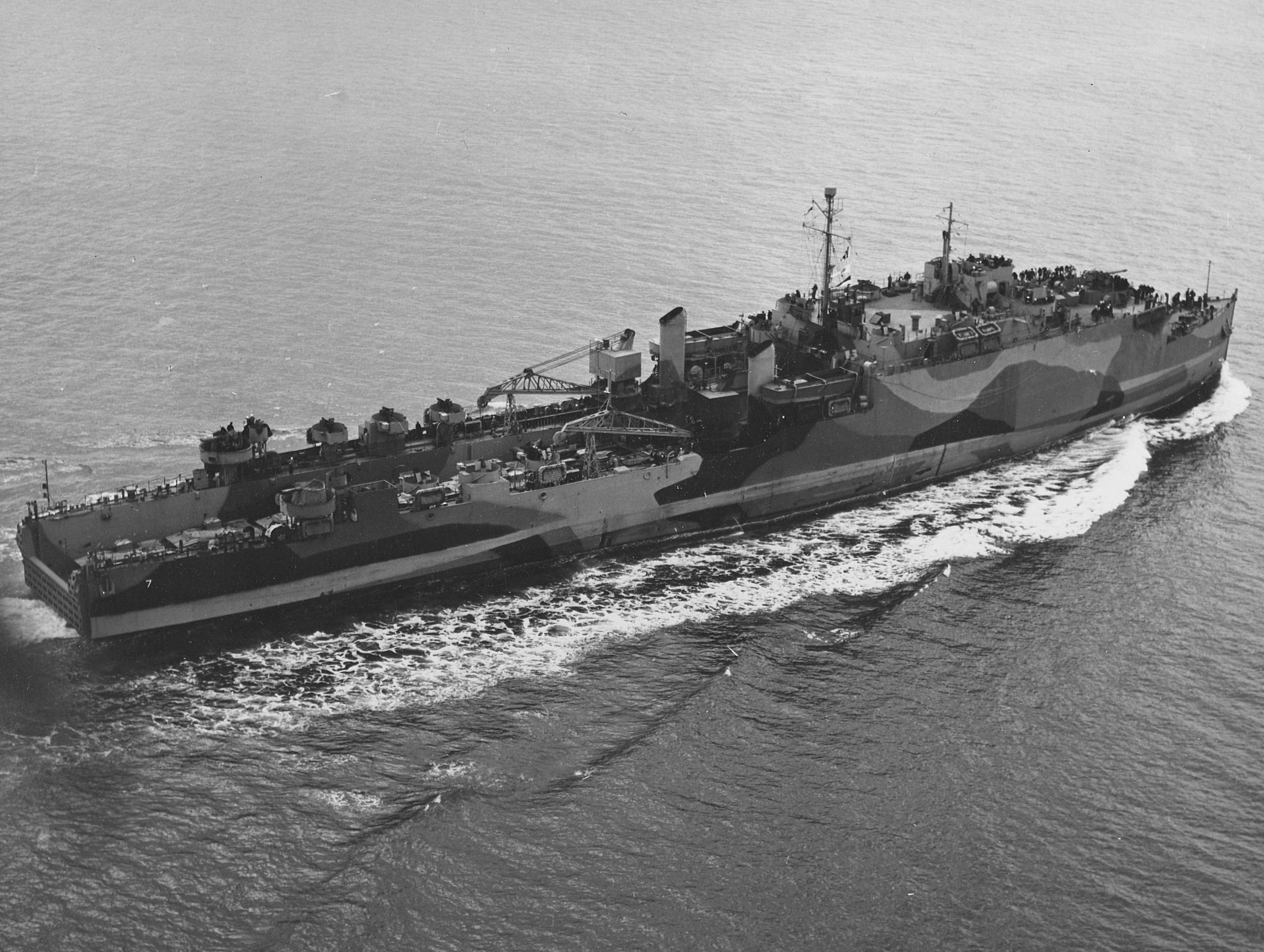
- USS Oak Hill (LSD-7) underway off San Francisco in April 1944

History

United States
- Name: USS Oak Hill
- Namesake: Oak Hill in Loudon County, Virginia
- Builder: Moore Dry Dock Company
- Laid down: 9 March 1943
- Launched: 25 June 1943
- Commissioned: 5 January 1944
- Decommissioned: 26 October 1969
- Stricken: 31 October 1969
- Fate: Sold for scrap, 15 April 1970

General characteristics
- Displacement: 7,930 tons (loaded), 4,032 tons (light draft)
- Length: 457 ft 9 in (139.5 m) overall
- Beam: 72 ft 2 in (22.0 m)
- Draft: 8 ft 2½ in (2.5 m) fwd, 10 ft ½ in (3.1 m) aft (light); 15 ft 5½ in (4.7 m) fwd, 16 ft 2 in (4.9 m) aft (loaded)
- Propulsion: 2 Babcock & Wilcox boilers, 2 Skinner Uniflow Reciprocating Steam Engines, 2 propeller shafts – each shaft 3,700 hp, at 240 rpm total shaft horse power 7,400, 2 11 ft 9 in diameter, 9 ft 9 in pitch propellers
- Speed: 17 knots (31 km/h)
- Range: 8,000 nmi. at 15 knots; (15,000 km at 28 km/h)
- Boats & landing craft carried: 3 × LCT (Mk V or VI); each w/ 5 medium tanks or; 2 × LCT (Mk III or IV); each w/ 12 medium tanks or; 14 × LCM (Mk III); each w/ 1 medium tank; or 1,500 long tons cargo or; 47 × DUKW or; 41 × LVT or; Any combination of landing vehicles and landing craft up to capacity
- Capacity: 22 officers, 218 men
- Complement: 17 officers, 237 men (ship); 6 officers, 30 men (landing craft)
- Armament: 1 × 5 in / 38 cal. DP gun; 2 × 40 mm quad AA guns; 2 × 40 mm twin AA guns; 16 × 20 mm AA guns
- Aircraft carried: modified to accommodate helicopters on an added portable deck

USS Oak Hill (LSD-7) was an Ashland-class dock landing ship of the United States Navy, named in honor of Oak Hill, the Virginia estate of President James Monroe (1758–1831).

Oak Hill, originally designated as a Mechanized Artillery Transport, APM-7, was laid down by the Moore Dry Dock Co., Oakland, California, 9 March 1943; launched on 25 June 1943, sponsored by Mrs. Robert E. Garrels; and commissioned on 5 January 1944.

== World War II ==
Following shakedown and amphibious training off southern California, Oak Hill, designed to serve as a cargo and transport type amphibious ship and as a floating dry dock, ferried cargo between the west coast and Hawaii. In early May she engaged in rehearsals for Operation Forager, the thrust into the Marianas, and, at the end of the month, sailed west in Task Group 52.16 (TG 52.16). With tank-bearing LCMs and troops of the 2nd Marine Division on board, she arrived in transport area off Saipan early on 15 June. Her boats soon away and headed for the beachhead, the LSD took up repair duties, working on LCMs, LCVPs and LCTs until the 22nd. She then headed back to Pearl Harbor to resume shuttling cargo and landing craft between Hawaii and the west coast.

On 12 August, Oak Hill, with tanks and soldiers of the 710th Tank Battalion embarked, headed west again. Following rehearsals for the Palau operation at Guadalcanal, she was off Babelthaup by 15 September. There she feinted toward Namai Bay, then proceeded to Angaur, sent her tank laden LCTs in, and again repaired landing craft. Departing the Palaus on the 21st, she moved to Ulithi, thence proceeded to New Guinea arriving at Humboldt Bay on the 29th to prepare for the invasion of the Philippines.

On 20 October Oak Hill stood off Leyte and launched LCMs and LVTs carrying 1st Cavalry Division units toward White beach. For the next two months she carried reinforcements from New Guinea to Leyte and then, on Christmas Day, arrived at Morotai to prepare for the Lingayen Gulf offensive. Departing the 28th, she proceeded to Sansapor, thence, on 1 January 1945, to the Philippines. On the 9th she dispatched LCTs and LCVPs to the Luzon beachhead, then withdrew to Leyte to begin ferrying reinforcements from there, and from Morotai, to the assault area.

Sailing to the Solomons on 2 February, Oak Hill rehearsed with units of the 1st Marine Division for her next operation, the Okinawa campaign. On 1 April, she arrived in transport area Baker, lowered her LCMs for the assault on Blue Beach and then began repairing landing craft. Through the end of May, she remained in the Hagushi area for repair duties. Then she transported Marines and tanks to Iheya Shima and to Aguni Shima before steaming back to Leyte, 10 June.

For the remainder of the war, Oak Hill transported men and equipment from the central Pacific to the Philippines and Okinawa. Post-war duties at Jinsen, Korea, and Qingdao, China, occupied the remainder of her tour in the Far East. In February 1946 she got underway for the United States and on 17 March 1947 she decommissioned and was berthed at San Diego as a unit of the Pacific Reserve Fleet.

== 1951–1965 ==
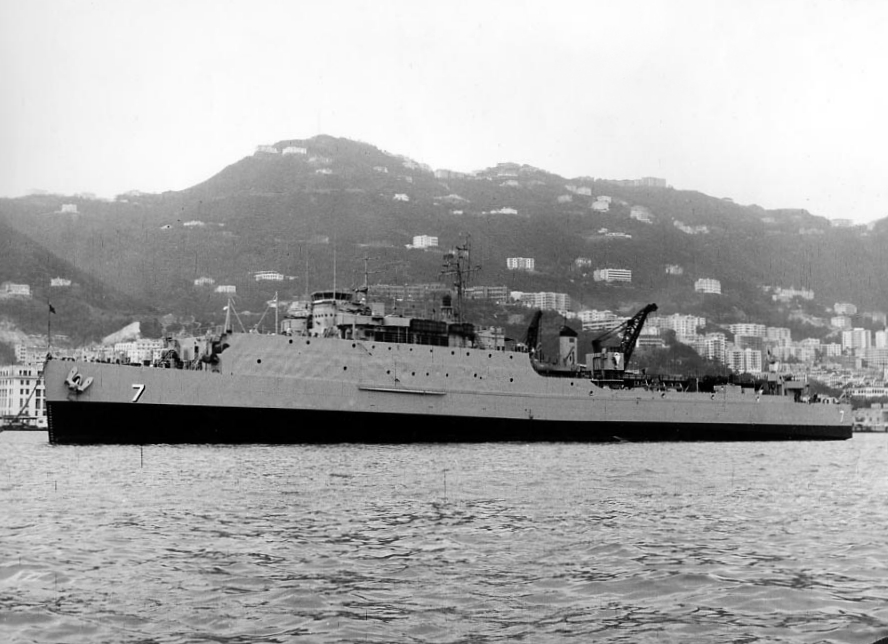
USS Oak Hill in the 1960s

After the outbreak of hostilities in Korea, Oak Hill recommissioned at San Diego 26 January 1951. Assigned to the Pacific Fleet, she participated in operation "Blue Jay", in Arctic waters, in the late summer months of 1951, and, between May and December 1952, took part in Operation Ivy – the atomic and hydrogen bomb tests in the Marshalls. Following that duty she was transferred to the Atlantic Fleet and homeported at Norfolk.

In January 1955 Oak Hill returned to San Diego and Pacific Fleet duty, departing for her first regular WestPac deployment 31 March. During her 1958 WestPac tour she supplied Nationalist Chinese offshore islands as they withstood shelling by Chinese Communist guns. After 1965, her annual western Pacific deployments took her to South East Asia where she supported Naval operations in strife-torn South Viet Nam. Operating primarily in the Da Nang – Cam Ranh Bay areas, she performed assignments as far south as the Mekong Delta and visited ports in Thailand, Taiwan, and Japan as well as in the Philippines.

Oak Hill was decommissioned on 26 October 1969, and stricken from the Naval Vessel Register on 31 October 1969. She was sold for scrapping, 15 April 1970, to Marine Power and Equipment Co., Seattle, Washington.

Oak Hill (LSD-7) earned five battle stars for World War II service and six campaign stars for Vietnam War service.
