= Caroline LeRoy =

Second wife of US orator Daniel Webster

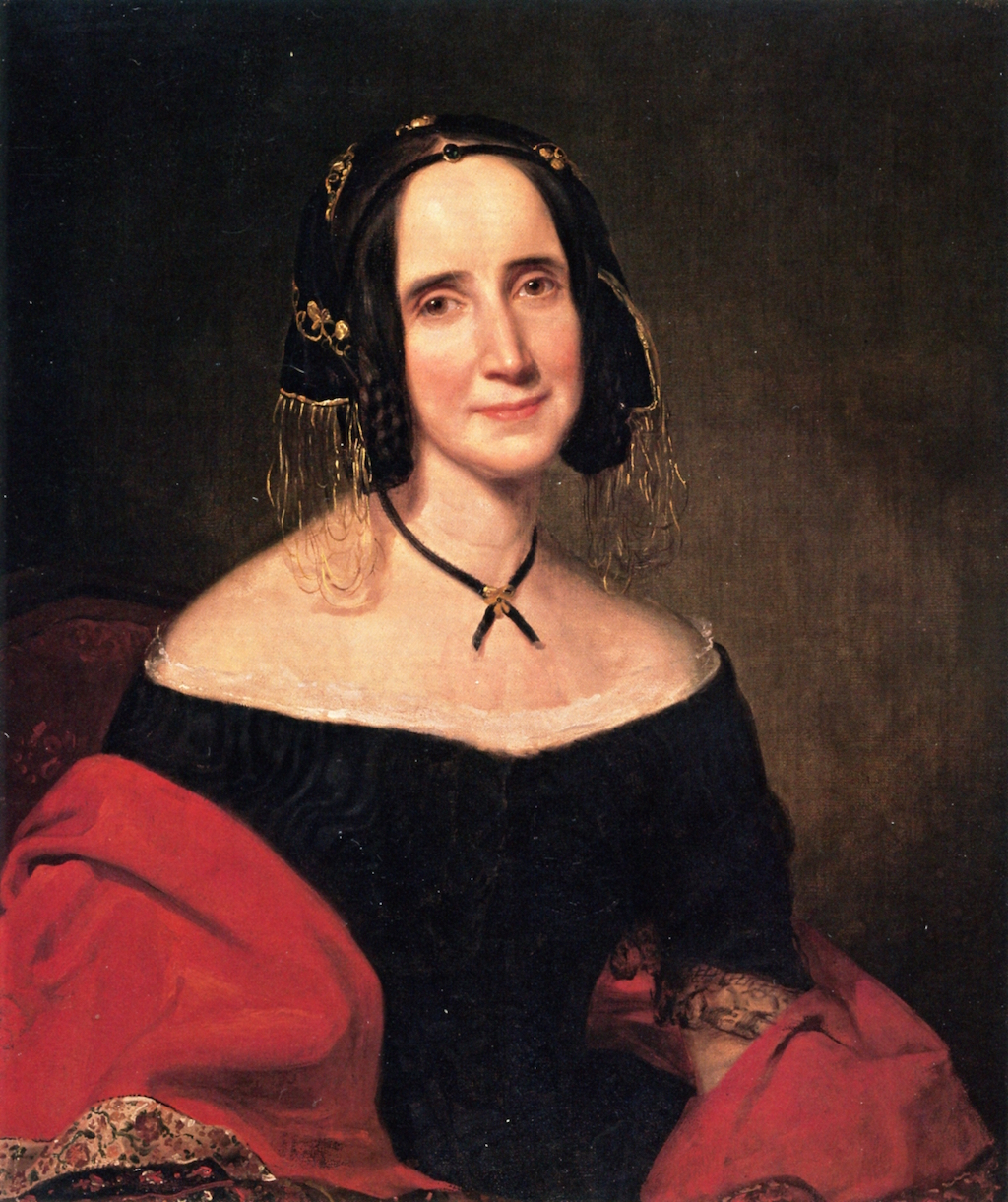
- Portrait c. 1845 by George Healy
- Born: September 28, 1797; New York City, New York, U.S.
- Died: February 26, 1882 (aged 84); New York City, New York, U.S.
- Resting place: Woodlawn Cemetery
- Spouse: Daniel Webster (m. 1829; died 1852)
- Parents: Herman LeRoy; Hannah Cornell LeRoy

Caroline LeRoy Webster (September 28, 1797 – February 26, 1882) was the second wife of 19th century statesman Daniel Webster.

== Early life ==
She was a daughter of Hannah (née Cornell) LeRoy and Herman LeRoy. Her father was once head of the commercial house of Leroy, Bayard, McKiven & Co., a large trading company that operated in different parts of the world. Herman also served as the first Dutch Consul to the United States.

A descendant of Thomas Cornell, Caroline's maternal grandfather, the Loyalist Samuel Cornell, was the last Royal Attorney General of North Carolina. Her aunt, Elizabeth Cornell, was married to banker William Bayard Jr., a close friend to Alexander Hamilton, and her first cousin, Harriet Elizabeth Bayard, was married to Stephen Van Rensselaer IV, the last patroon of the Manor of Rensselaerswyck.

== Personal life ==
She was the second wife to Daniel Webster, after Grace Fletcher Webster's death. She met Webster at her father's house while Webster was a guest there. After only a few months of courtship they got married. Their wedding was an upscale one with a large and fashionable assemblage.

In 1839, she traveled to Europe with Webster, during this time she was a guest of Queen Victoria and the Duke of Wellington as well as other members of the British government and the British aristocracy.

When Daniel Webster died in 1852, Caroline received $100,000 (about $3.7 million in 2023) which was invested for her benefit. Thirty years later after Daniel Webster's death, Caroline LeRoy Webster died in her home in New York City after increasing illness and pneumonia. She died on February 26, 1882, in her bed. She was then buried in Woodlawn Cemetery in New York.
