= Herman LeRoy =

American banker (1758–1841)

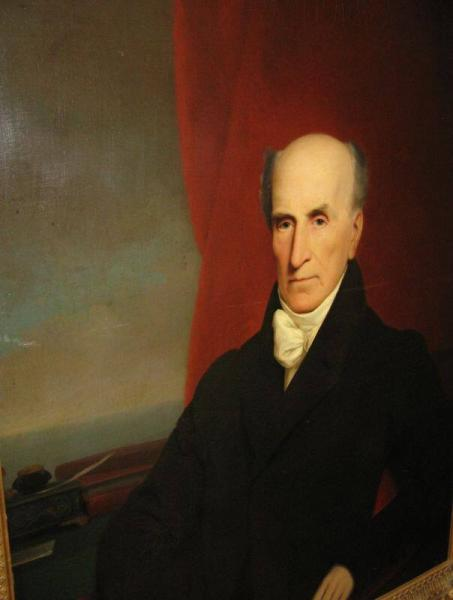

President of the Bank of New York
- In office 1802–1804
- Preceded by: Nicholas Gouverneur
- Succeeded by: Matthew Clarkson

Personal details
- Born: 16 January 1758 New York City, Province of New York, British America
- Died: 31 March 1841 (aged 83) New York City, US
- Spouse: Hannah Cornell (m. 1786; died 1818)

Herman LeRoy (January 16, 1758 – March 31, 1841) was an American merchant, shipowner and banker.

== Early life ==
He was born on January 16, 1758, in New York City in what was then the Province of New York, a part of British America. He was the son of Jacob LeRoy (1727–1793) and Cornelia (née Rutgers) LeRoy (1736–1765). Among his siblings were Mary Ann LeRoy (who married John Livingston), Jacob Leroy (who married Martha Banyer), Robert Leroy (who married Catherine Cuyler) and Elizabeth (who married Julian McEvers). His father, who was born in Rotterdam, was a merchant and alderman of New York City.

His paternal grandparents were Daniel Leroy and Ingenatia (née van den Bergh) Le Roy. His maternal grandparents were Hermanus Rutgers III and Elizabeth (née Benson) Rutgers. His mother was a first cousin of New York State Assemblyman Henry Rutgers and Samuel Provoost, the first Bishop of the Episcopal Diocese of New York, among others.

== Career ==
In 1786, he was consul-general for Holland. In 1788, he went into business with his wife's brother-in-law, William Bayard Jr., and founded LeRoy, Bayard & Co. which later became LeRoy, Bayard & McEvers when he introduced his brother-in-law, Julian McEvers. It again became LeRoy, Bayard & Co. after McEver's death. The firm was one the largest commercial house in New York City, shipping goods and trading product throughout the world. By 1792, LeRoy and Bayard represented the Holland Land Company, which owned roughly 3 million acres of land in Western New York, and between the two of them, they owned 300,000-acres. In 1813, he founded the town of LeRoy in Genesee County which was incorporated in 1834.

A director of the Bank of the United States, following the death of Nicholas Gouverneur, he was elected president of the Bank of New York in 1802, a position he held until 1804.

== Personal life ==
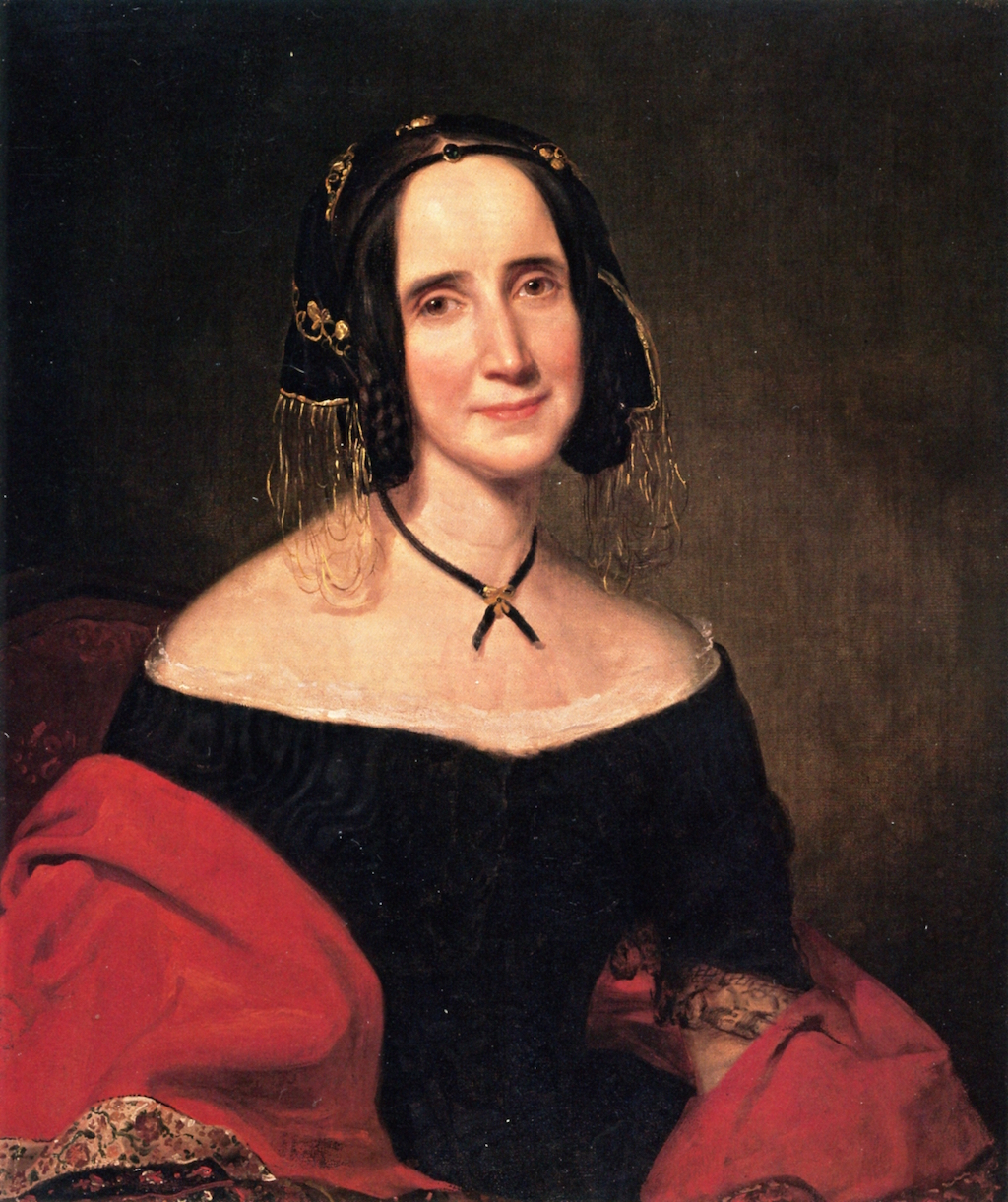
Portrait of his daughter Caroline Webster, by George Peter Alexander Healy, c. 1845

On October 19, 1786, LeRoy was married to Hannah Cornell (1760–1818), a daughter of Susannah (née Mabson) Cornell and Loyalist Samuel Cornell, a descendant of settler Thomas Cornell. Hannah's father died in 1781 in British-controlled New York, having moved there from North Carolina after 1777 after refusing to take the Oath of Allegiance to the new United States. Her sister, Elizabeth Cornell, was the wife of William Bayard Jr. They lived at 4 Bowling Green before moving to 7 Broadway where he built a white marble house. He also owned a country home in Pelham, New York, where his daughter, Caroline, married Daniel Webster. He was one of only 15-New Yorkers who then owned a carriage. Together, they were the parents of had ten children who survived to adulthood, including:

- Cornelia LeRoy (1787–1860), who married William Edgar, only son of William Edgar.
- Catharine Augusta LeRoy (1790–1835), who married Thomas Haines Newbold, a son of Caleb Newbold and Sarah (née Haines) Newbold.
- Herman LeRoy Jr. (1791–1869), who married Juliet Edgar, a daughter of William Edgar, in 1813.
- Susan LeRoy (1793–1832), who married Judge David Samuel Jones, a son of Comptroller Samuel Jones and Cornelia (née Haring) Jones, and brother to Chancellor Samuel Jones.
- Jacob Rutgers LeRoy (1794–1868), who built Le Roy House and married Charlotte Downes Otis, a daughter of Thomas Otis.
- William Henry LeRoy (1795–1888), who married Elizabeth Emmet, a daughter of Attorney General of New York Thomas Addis Emmet and Jane (née Patten) Emmet, in 1819.
- Caroline LeRoy (1797–1882), who married, as his second wife, U.S. Secretary of State Daniel Webster, the son of Abigail (née Eastman) and Ebenezer Webster, in 1829.
- Daniel LeRoy (1799–1885), who married Susan Fish, a daughter of Adjutant General Nicholas Fish and Elizabeth Stuyvesant, and sister to U.S. senator Hamilton Fish, in 1826.
- Mary LeRoy (1800–1828), who died unmarried.
- Edward Augustus LeRoy (1804–1865), who married Sarah Louisa Morris, a daughter of James Morris of Morrisania and Helen Van Cortlandt.

LeRoy died on March 31, 1841, in New York City.

=== Descendants ===
Through his daughter Catharine, he was a grandfather of Thomas Haines Newbold (who married Mary Elizabeth Rhinelander) and great-grandfather of New York State Senator Thomas Newbold (who married Sarah Lawrence Coolidge, a direct descendant of Thomas Jefferson).

Through his son Jacob, he was a grandfather of Charlotte LeRoy (who married Henry Louis De Koven) and great-grandfather of music critic Reginald De Koven (who married Anna Farwell, a daughter of U.S. senator Charles B. Farwell).
