= Mrs. Thomas Gage =

Painting by John Singleton Copley

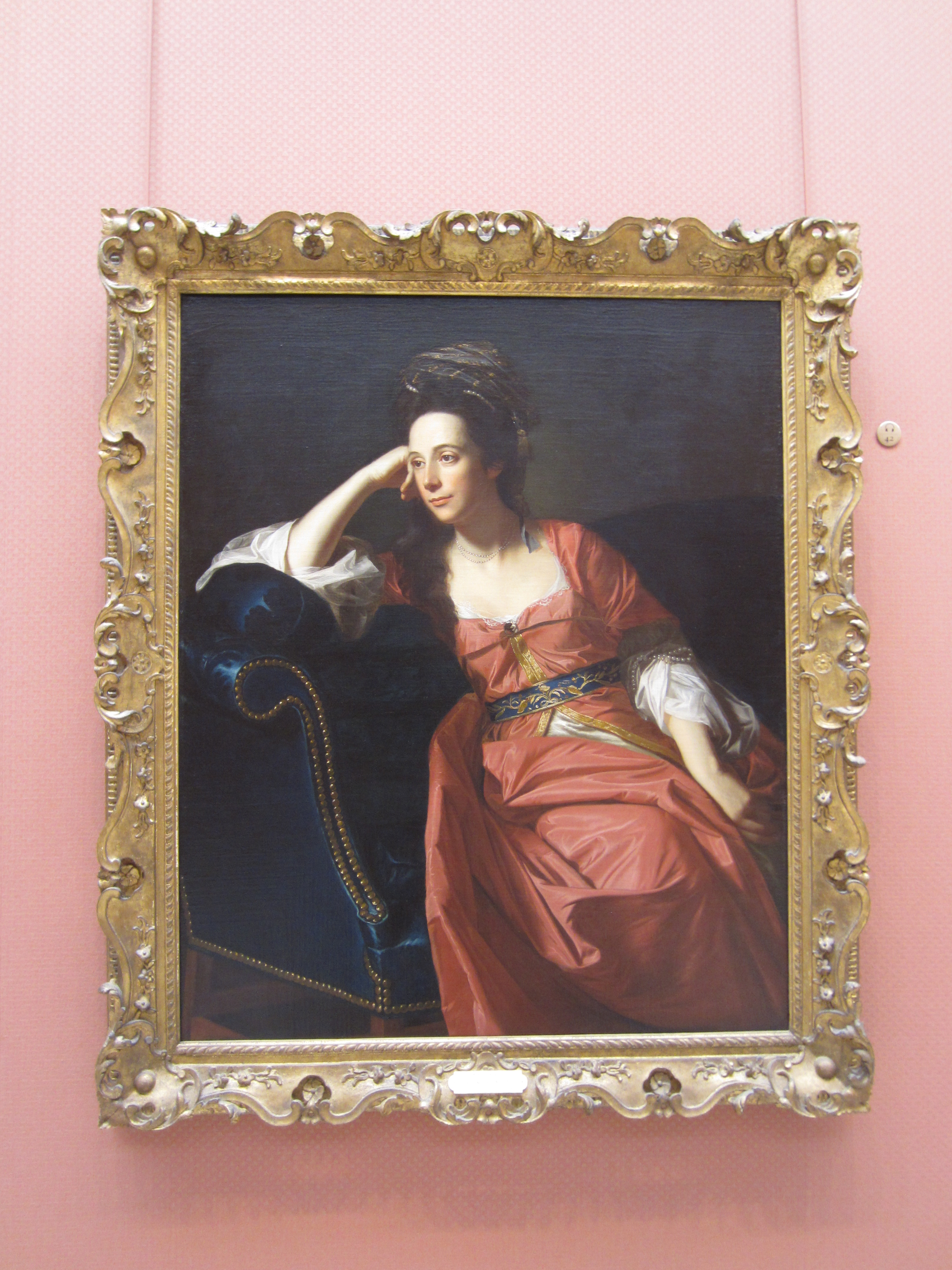
- The painting in the Timken Museum of Art in 2016
- Artist: John Singleton Copley
- Year: 1771
- Medium: oil on canvas
- Dimensions: 127 cm × 101.6 cm (50 in × 40.0 in)
- Location: Timken Museum of Art, San Diego, California, U.S.

Mrs. Thomas Gage is a 1771 oil painting on canvas by John Singleton Copley.

The portrait depicts Margaret Kemble Gage, the American-born wife of the British General Thomas Gage, commander-in-chief of the British forces in North America. It was painted in New York during a six-month stay there by Bostonian Copley. The work was displayed at the Society of Artists Exhibition of 1772 in London.

== See also ==
- Portrait of Thomas Gage, Copley's 1768 painting of her husband
