= United States Attorney for the District of Virginia =

Defunct U.S. federal prosecutor's office

United States Attorney for the District of Virginia was a United States Attorney's office based in the state of Virginia until 1824. The U.S. Attorney for Virginia was the chief law enforcement officer for the United States District Court for the District of Virginia. The district was succeeded by the United States Attorney for the Western District of Virginia and the United States Attorney for the Eastern District of Virginia.

== Office holders ==
- John Marshall (1789)
- William Nelson (1789–1790)
- William Nelson Jr. (1790–1791)
- Alexander Campbell (1791–1796)
- Thomas Nelson (1796–1801)
- John Monroe (1801–1803)
- George Hay (1803–1816)
- William Wirt (1816–1817)
- Robert Stanard (1817–1824)
