= Portrait of Thomas Gage =

Painting by John Singleton Copley

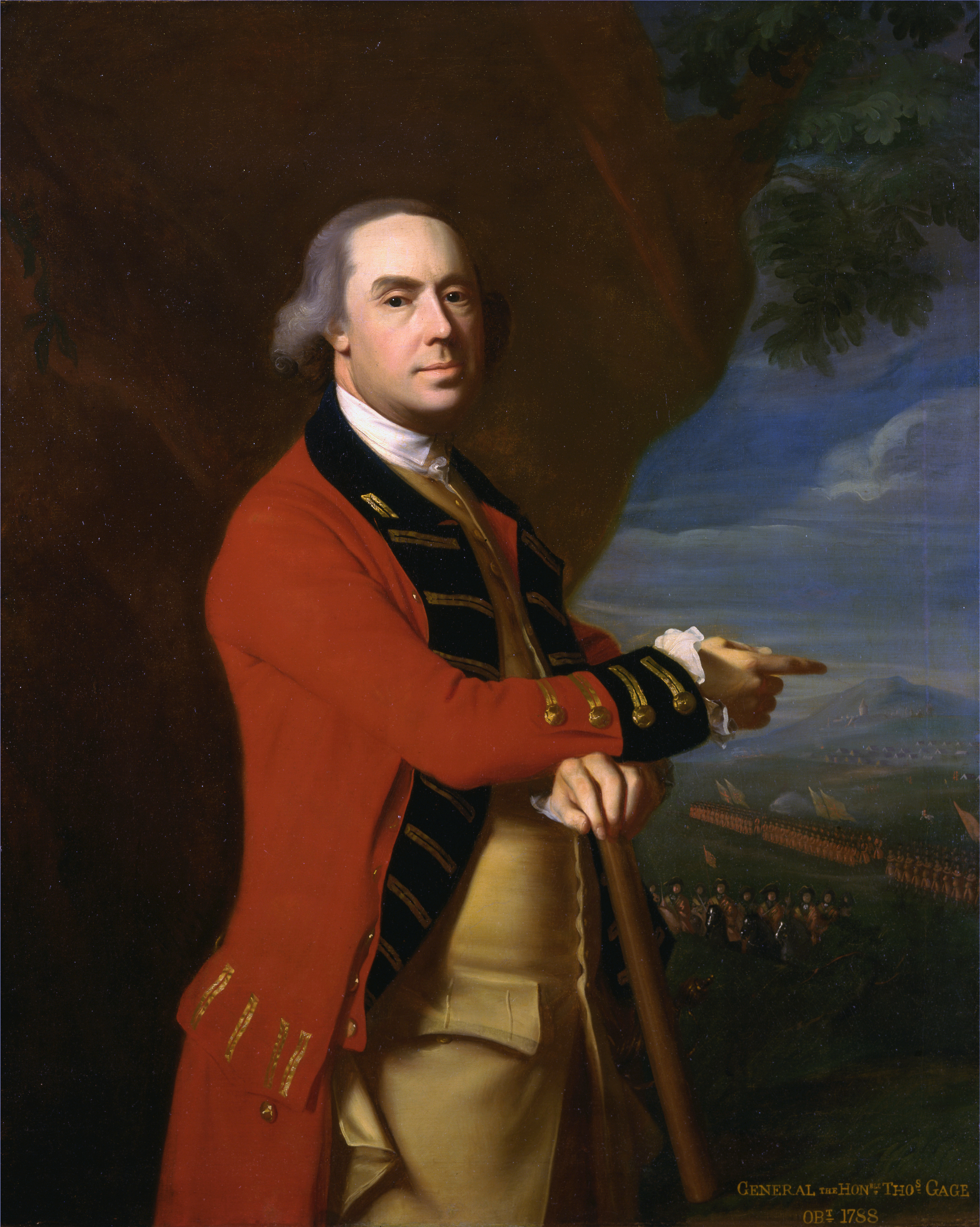
- Artist: John Singleton Copley
- Year: 1768
- Type: Oil on canvas, portrait
- Dimensions: 127 cm × 101 cm (50 in × 40 in)
- Location: Yale Center for British Art; New Haven, Connecticut

Portrait of Thomas Gage is a 1768 portrait painting by the American artist John Singleton Copley depicting the British general Thomas Gage.

Gage was Commander-in-Chief of the British Army in North America having served there during the Seven Years' War. Gage was paying a visit from his headquarters in New York to Boston where Copley was based. The commission marked an important step forward in Copley's career. He depicts the general in the style Joshua Reynolds used for military portraits.

Once completed, Gage hung it prominently in his house in Broad Street in New York. Gage then shipped it to London where it hung in the general's residence in Arlington Street in Piccadilly and was widely admired, a further encouragement for Copley's later move to Britain.

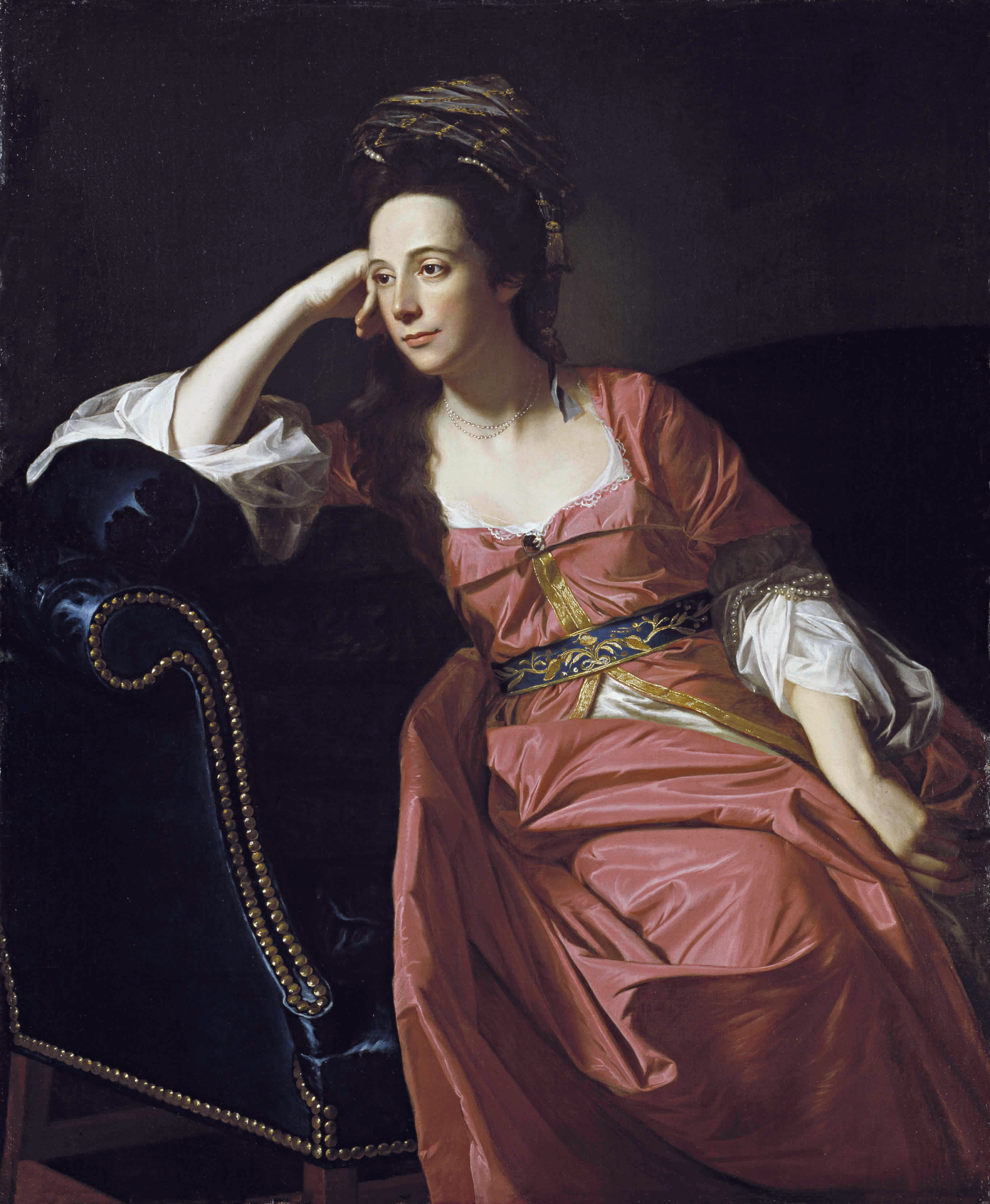
Mrs. Thomas Gage. Copley's 1771 portrait of the general's wife Margaret Kemble Gage.

Today it is in the collection of the Yale Center for British Art in Connecticut. Copley also painted his American-born wife Margaret Kemble Gage a few years later in his Mrs. Thomas Gage.

== Bibliography ==
- Kamensky, Jane. A Revolution in Color: The World of John Singleton Copley. W. W. Norton & Company, 2016.
- Prown, Jules David. John Singleton Copley: In England, 1774–1815. National Gallery of Art, Washington, 1966.
