= James Monroe Law Office =

Historic commercial building in Virginia, United States

- Monroe Law Office
- U.S. National Register of Historic Places
- U.S. National Historic Landmark
- U.S. Historic district – Contributing property
- Virginia Landmarks Register
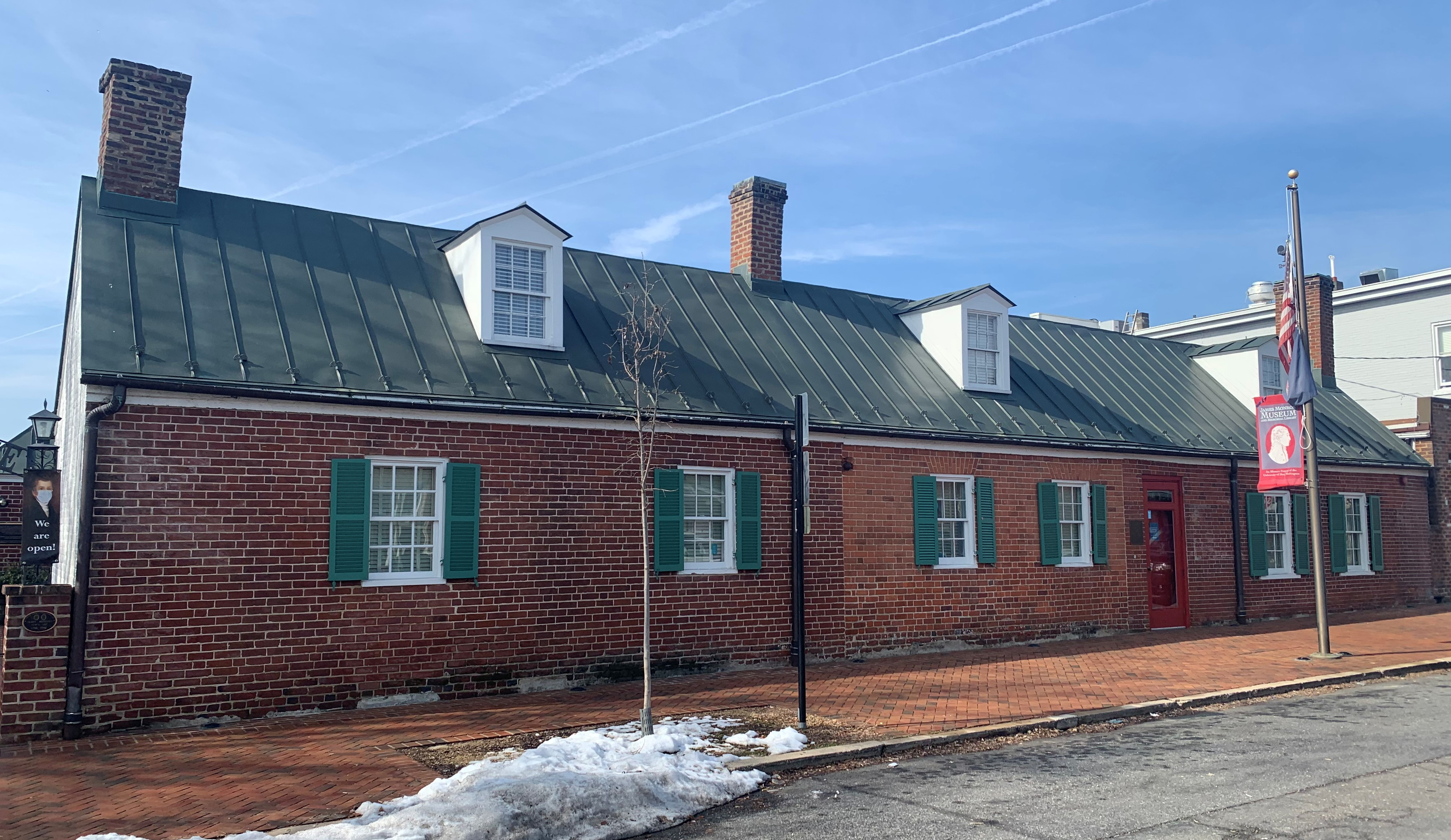
- James Monroe Museum and Memorial Library, February 2022

- Location within Northern Virginia Location within Virginia Location within the United States
- Location: 908 Charles Street, Fredericksburg, Virginia
- Coordinates: 38°18′9″N 77°27′42″W
- Built: 1786
- Part of: Fredericksburg Historic District (ID71001053)
- NRHP reference No.: 66000917
- VLR No.: 111-0066

Significant dates
- Added to NRHP: November 13, 1966
- Designated NHL: November 13, 1966
- Designated CP: September 22, 1971
- Designated VLR: September 9, 1969

The James Monroe Museum and Memorial Library is a historic museum at 908 Charles Street in Fredericksburg, Virginia. It is located on the site of the James Monroe Law Office, used by future United States President James Monroe from 1786 to 1789. It was declared a National Historic Landmark in 1966. It is now owned by the Commonwealth of Virginia and operated by the University of Mary Washington. The museum features original objects and memorabilia related to James Monroe, and includes items relating to other members of his family, including dresses worn by First Lady Elizabeth Monroe.

== Description and history ==
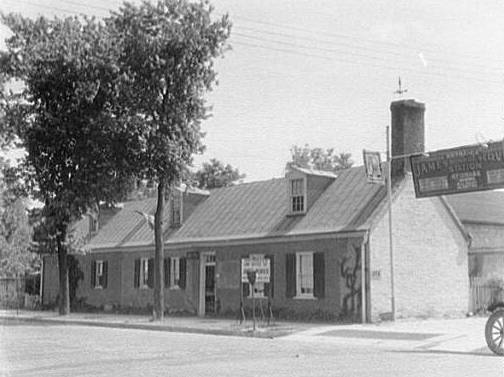
Historic image of the James Monroe Law Office, between circa 1920 and circa 1950

The Monroe Museum is located in central Fredericksburg, on the west side of Charles Street, between William and George Streets. It is housed in a two-part building that is roughly L-shaped. The older portion is a long 1 1/2-story brick structure, with a gabled roof, built in 1758. To this is attached a larger 1 1/2-story square brick building dating to 1964, when the museum and library were organized. The addition houses Monroe memorabilia, and a small library containing volumes similar to those that might have been in Monroe's library. The museum also houses a collection of furnishings and other artifacts belonging to the Monroes, although most date to the 19th century.

The outside includes a memorial garden to James Monroe, which features a bust of him sculpted by Margaret French Cresson, daughter of Daniel Chester French.

This building, composed of three separate 19th century structures later joined, occupies a site said by tradition to be the law office of future United States President James Monroe from 1786 to 1789. Monroe had prior to this time served in the Virginia House of Delegates and in the Congress of the Confederation, from which he resigned in 1786. In 1788, he was a delegate to the Virginia ratifying convention for the United States Constitution. He initially opposed adoption until a Bill of Rights could be added.

Monroe's law office was acquired in 1928 by Laurence Hoes, a Monroe family descendant who established the James Monroe Memorial Foundation (see: www.monroefoundation.org) to manage the property. He accumulated a variety of artifacts related to his illustrious ancestor, restored the property, and opened it as a museum. In 1964, the addition was built, and the Monroe Foundation gave the property to the state. It is now managed by a board consisting of members of the Monroe Foundation and the regents of the University of Mary Washington.

== See also ==
- List of National Historic Landmarks in Virginia
- National Register of Historic Places listings in Fredericksburg, Virginia
- Presidential memorials in the United States
