= Elizabeth Monroe =

First Lady of the United States from 1817 to 1825

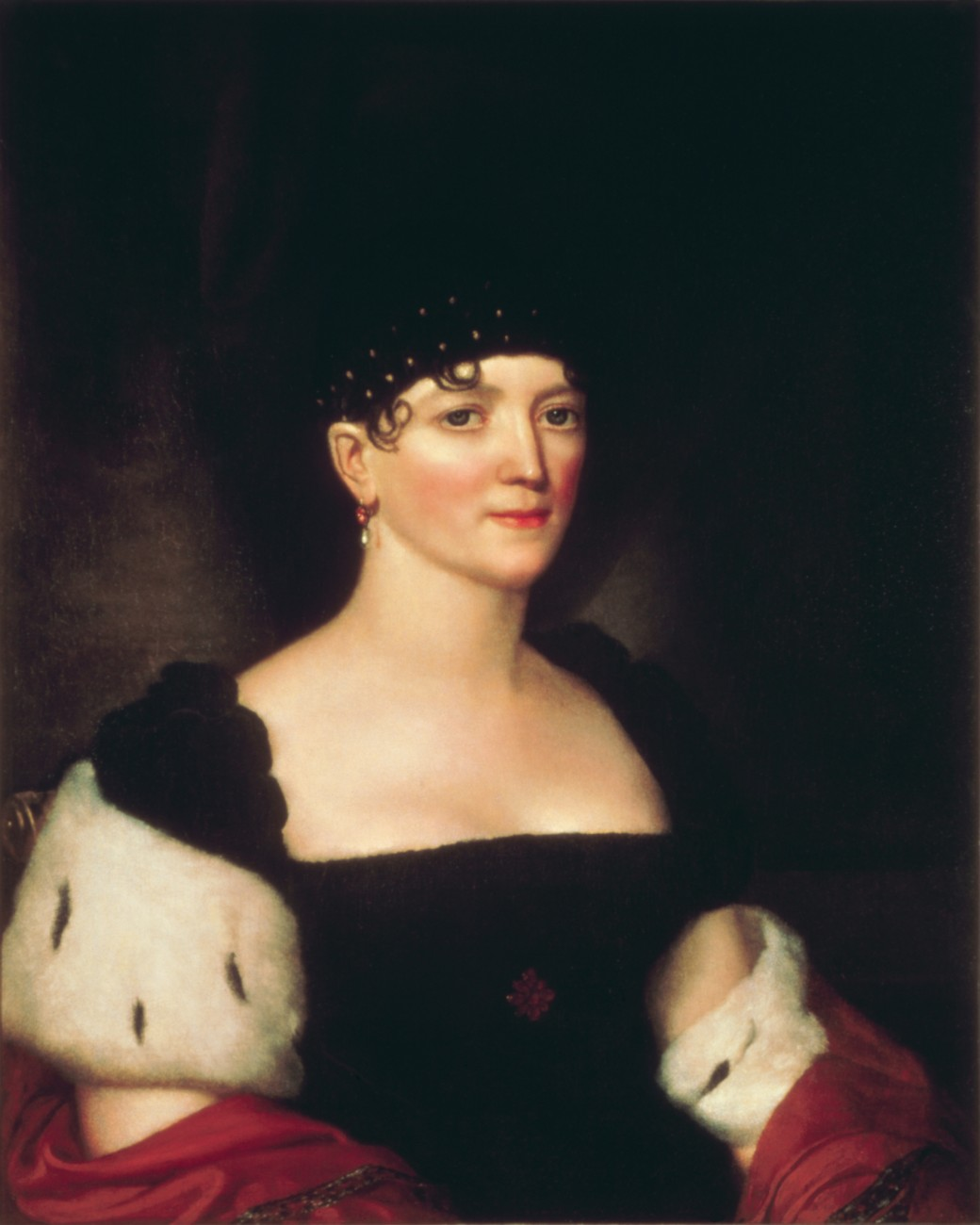
- Monroe depicted in an early 19th century portrait

First Lady of the United States
- In role March 4, 1817 – March 4, 1825
- President: James Monroe
- Preceded by: Dolley Madison
- Succeeded by: Louisa Adams

First Lady of Virginia
- In role December 28, 1799 – December 1, 1802
- Governor: James Monroe
- Preceded by: Jean Moncure Wood
- Succeeded by: Margaret Lowther Page
- In role January 16, 1811 – April 2, 1811
- Governor: James Monroe
- Preceded by: Agnes Sarah Bell Cabell (1808)
- Succeeded by: Jane Reade Smith

Personal details
- Born: Elizabeth Kortright; June 30, 1768 New York City, New York, British America
- Died: September 23, 1830 (aged 62) Oak Hill in Aldie, Virginia, U.S.
- Resting place: Hollywood Cemetery in Richmond, U.S.
- Spouse: James Monroe (m. 1786)
- Children: 3, including Eliza and Maria

Elizabeth Monroe (née Kortright; June 30, 1768 – September 23, 1830) was the first lady of the United States from 1817 to 1825, as the wife of James Monroe, fifth president of the United States. Due to the fragile condition of Monroe's health, many of her duties as the official White House hostess were assumed by her eldest daughter, Eliza Monroe Hay.

== Birth, parents, and childhood (1768–1778) ==
Monroe was born in New York City on June 30, 1768, the youngest daughter of Lawrence Kortright, a wealthy merchant, and Hannah (née Aspinwall) Kortright. Elizabeth Monroe's paternal second great grandfather, Cornelius Jansen Kortright, was born in Holland, Netherlands, in 1645, and immigrated to New York in the year of 1663. His father, Jan Bastiaenson Van Kortrijk, was also born in Holland, Netherlands in 1618 and immigrated with his son to New York. Jan Bastiaenson's father, Bastiaen Van Kortrijk, was born in the city of Kortrijk in Flanders, Spanish Netherlands, in 1586, and immigrated to Holland, Netherlands, in 1615. Monroe's father was one of the founders of the New York Chamber of Commerce. During the American Revolutionary War, he was part owner of several privateers fitted out at New York, and it has also been documented that he enslaved at least four Black people. He purchased land tracts in what is now Delaware County, New York, and from the sale of this land the town of Kortright, New York, was formed.

Monroe grew up in a household with four older siblings: Sarah, Hester, John and Mary. According to the parish records of Trinity Church, New York, Monroe's mother, Hannah, died on September 6 or 7, 1777, at the age of 39. The cause of death was recorded as resulting from childbed. An unidentified sibling of Monroe's, aged 13 months, succumbed to flux and fever a few days later. Hannah and the infant were both buried at St. George's Chapel in New York. At the time of their deaths, Monroe was nine years old. Her father never remarried.

On August 3, 1778, almost a year after the death of Monroe's mother, the home of the Lawrence Kortright family was nearly destroyed by fire during a blaze which caused damage and destruction to fifty homes near Cruger's Wharf in lower Manhattan. A historian later wrote that this blaze was due to the mismanagement of British troops while directing the firefighters. Monroe, age 10, with her father and siblings, survived the fire unscathed.

== Courtship and marriage (1785–1786) ==
Kortright first caught the attention of James Monroe in 1785 while he was in New York City serving as a member of the Continental Congress. William Grayson, James Monroe's cousin and fellow Congressman from Virginia, described Elizabeth and her sisters as having "made so brilliant and lovely an appearance" at a theater one evening, "as to depopulate all the other boxes of all the genteel male people therein."

James Monroe, then 27 years old, married Elizabeth, then 17 years old, on February 16, 1786, at her father's home in New York City. The marriage was performed by Reverend Benjamin Moore, and recorded in the parish records of Trinity Church, New York. After a brief honeymoon on Long Island, the newlyweds returned to New York City to live with her father until Congress adjourned. Their first child, whom they named Eliza Kortright Monroe, was born in December, 1786, in Virginia.

== Ambassador's wife (1794–1796) ==
In 1794, George Washington appointed James as United States Minister to France. In Paris, as wife of the American Minister during the Reign of Terror, she helped secure the release of Madame La Fayette, wife of the Marquis de Lafayette, when she learned she was imprisoned and scheduled to be executed by guillotine. The Monroes also provided support and shelter to the American citizen Thomas Paine in Paris, after he was arrested for his opposition to the execution of Louis XVI. While in France, the Monroes' daughter Eliza became a friend of Hortense de Beauharnais, step-daughter of Napoleon, and both girls received their education in the school of Madame Jeanne Campan. James was recalled from his Ambassadorship in 1796, due in part to his support of France in the opposition of the Jay Treaty.

== Governor's wife (1799–1802) ==
The Monroes returned to Virginia, where James became governor, and Elizabeth became First Lady of Virginia. The couple's son, James Spence, was born in 1799 but died in 1800. During this time, Elizabeth suffered the first of a series of seizures and collapses that were possibly a product of epilepsy, which plagued her for the rest of her life and gradually caused her to restrict her social activities. The Monroe's third child, a daughter they named Maria Hester, was born in Virginia in early 1802.

== Great Britain (1803–1804) ==
In 1803, President Thomas Jefferson appointed James as United States Minister to Great Britain and Spain. Elizabeth found the social climate in London less favorable than it had been in Paris, possibly because British society resented the United States' refusal to aid it in its conflict with France. In 1804, James was sent as a special envoy to France to negotiate the Louisiana Purchase. That same year, the Monroes were invited by Napoleon Bonaparte to attend his coronation in Paris, as part of the official American delegation.

== Return to Virginia and Washington (1807–1817) ==
The Monroes returned to Virginia in 1807. James Monroe won election and returned to the Virginia House of Delegates, and also resumed his legal career. In 1811, Monroe won election to another term as governor of Virginia, but served only four months. In April 1811, his friend President James Madison appointed Monroe Secretary of State, and he was confirmed to the position by the United States Senate. Monroe had little to do with the War of 1812, since President Madison and the war hawks in Congress were dominant. During the War, Elizabeth stayed primarily at the Monroe family estates at Oak Hill in Loudoun County, Virginia, and later at Ashlawn-Highland in Albemarle County, Virginia.

The war went very badly, so Madison turned to Monroe for help, appointing him United States Secretary of War in September 1814 after the Burning of Washington by the British, who had captured the national capital and burned the White House. Monroe resigned as Secretary of State on October 1 but no successor was ever appointed, so he handled both offices from October 1, 1814 to February 28, 1815. As Secretary of War, Monroe formulated plans to invade Canada a second time to win the War of 1812, but a peace treaty was ratified in February 1815, before any U.S. military forced moved north. Monroe then resigned as Secretary of War and was formally re-appointed Secretary of State, where he served until March 4, 1817, when he succeeded James Madison to become the nation's fifth President of the United States.

== First Lady of the United States (1817–1825) ==
Elizabeth began her tenure as First Lady on March 4, 1817, when her husband commenced his first term as the fifth president of the United States. Upon moving into the White House, the Monroes relocated several of the dozens of Black people they enslaved in order to continue their forced labor. However, the White House was still under reconstruction, so Elizabeth hosted the inaugural ball at their private residence on I Street, and part of the time the First Family lived in the Octagon House. Since all the White House furnishings had been destroyed, the Monroes brought some from their private residences. Her husband was re-elected to a second term in office in 1820, and Elizabeth attended the inaugural ball held in Brown's Hotel. She remained in her role of First Lady until March 4, 1825.

Although Elizabeth Monroe regained a measure of respect and admiration during her husband's second term, she compared poorly to her predecessor, Dolley Madison, who had captivated Washington society, setting a standard by which future First Ladies were measured. Furthermore, Elizabeth and her eldest daughter may have sought to make access to the White House more socially exclusive, reflecting French practices, which were barely tolerated given American democratic values, although President Monroe's term was also known for good feelings and relations. Still, Elizabeth had made such an impression upon General Andrew Jackson that her husband always mentioned her to him in their correspondence. Elizabeth also drew favorable reviews as the couple briefly hosted General Lafayette during his return tour through America. During Elizabeth's illnesses, some of the social duties were carried out by her daughters, as discussed below. Furthermore, James or Elizabeth destroyed her correspondence, both between themselves and with others, before her death.

Since 1982 Siena College Research Institute has periodically conducted surveys asking historians to assess American first ladies according to a cumulative score on the independent criteria of their background, value to the country, intelligence, courage, accomplishments, integrity, leadership, being their own women, public image, and value to the president. Consistently, Monroe has been ranked in the lower-half of first ladies by historians in these surveys. In terms of cumulative assessment, Monroe has been ranked:

- 24th-best of 42 in 1982
- 23rd-best of 37 in 1993
- 31st-best of 38 in 2003
- 29th-best of 38 in 2008
- 30th-best of 38 in 2014
- 33rd-best of 40 in 2020

In the 2014 survey, Monroe and her husband were also ranked the 15th-highest out of 39 first couples in terms of being a "power couple".

== Children (1786–1802) ==
James and Elizabeth had three children:

- Elizabeth ("Eliza") Kortright Monroe Hay (1786–January 27, 1840): Born in Virginia in December, 1786, Eliza was educated at the school of Madame Jeanne Campan in Paris, when her father served as United States Ambassador to France. Eliza appeared to many a haughty, pompous socialite, quick to remind others of her good breeding and lofty station. In late September or early October 1808 she married George Hay, a prominent Virginia attorney who had served as prosecutor in the trial of Aaron Burr and later U.S. District Judge. Their daughter, Hortense, was named in honor of her childhood friend and classmate, Hortense de Beauharnais, step-daughter of Napoleon. During her father's presidency, Eliza alienated most of Washington society for her refusal to call on wives of the diplomatic corps, as was the custom, and caused another social furor in closing her sister's wedding to all but family and friends. For all her apparent vanity, however, she demonstrated genuine compassion during the fever epidemic that swept Washington during her father's Presidency. She spent many sleepless nights selflessly caring for victims. Following the deaths of her husband and father, Eliza moved to Paris, France, where she died on January 27, 1840.
- James Spence Monroe (1799–1800): The only son of the Monroes, James Spence was 16 months old when he died after "several days sickness".
- Maria Hester Monroe Gouverneur (1802–June 20, 1850) In an April 12, 1802 letter to James Madison, James Monroe states that his wife recently added a daughter to their family. Parish records indicate that Maria was born on April 8. The following year, while still an infant, Maria accompanied her parents to London, when James Monroe became Ambassador from the United States to the Court of St. James. Upon the family's return to the United States, Maria finished school in Philadelphia. On March 9, 1820, she married her first cousin, Samuel L. Gouverneur, in the first wedding of a president's child at the White House. Many in Washington criticized the Monroes for keeping the wedding private; just 42 members of the family and close friends were invited. Friction between Maria's husband and her outspoken sister strained family relations thereafter. The Gouverneurs moved to New York City. Former President Monroe, upon losing his wife in 1830, moved in with them. President John Quincy Adams appointed her husband postmaster of New York City. Maria died on June 20, 1850, at the age of 48, at Oak Hill, in Loudon County, Virginia.

== Death and legacy (1825–1830) ==
After Monroe's terms as president expired, he and Elizabeth faced considerable debts from their years of public service, both from non-reimbursed entertaining expenses and because Monroe was forced to manage their various properties remotely. Monroe sold his plantation, Highland in Albemarle County to pay debts, and both retired to Oak Hill in Loudoun County, nearer Washington, D.C., and their daughter Eliza and her husband (although the Hays moved to Richmond in 1825 when he became the U.S. District Judge for Virginia). Although retiring, Elizabeth managed to travel to New York to visit her younger daughter, as well as other friends and relations, but made no further social visits. Sickly and suffering several long illnesses (including severe burns from a collapse near a fireplace a year after leaving the White House), Elizabeth died at Oak Hill on September 23, 1830, aged 62, her husband following her less than a year later, aged 73.

She was interred at the estate, but her husband later died in New York under their daughter's care and was originally buried in that northern state. His remains were moved 25 years after his death to become a key attraction during the development of Hollywood Cemetery in Richmond, Virginia. Elizabeth's remains were reinterred there in 1903, where both spouses remain buried.

The First Spouse Program under the Presidential $1 Coin Act authorizes the United States Mint to issue 1/2 ounce $10 gold coins and bronze medal duplicates to honor the first spouses of the United States. Elizabeth Monroe's coin was released in February 2008.

A gown in the collection of the James Monroe Museum indicates Elizabeth was a petite woman, not taller than 5 feet.

=== Relations ===
Monroe family tree

Lawrence Kortright (1728–1794)	Hannah Aspinwall (1738–1777)
James Monroe (1758–1831)	Elizabeth Kortright Monroe (1768–1830)	Hester Kortright (1770–1842)	Nicholas Gouverneur (1753–1802)
George Hay (1765–1830)	Eliza Monroe Hay (1786–1840)	Maria Hester Monroe (1802–1850)	Samuel L. Gouverneur (1799–1865)	Maria Charlotte Gouverneur (1801–1867)	Thomas McCall Cadwalader (1795–1873)
John Lambert Cadwalader (1836–1914)

Notes:

Honorary titles
Preceded by Dolley Madison	First Lady of the United States; 1817–1825	Succeeded by Louisa Adams
