= Peter Kemble =

American politician

President of the New Jersey Provincial Council
- In office 1764–1775
- Preceded by: Robert Hunter Morris
- Succeeded by: John Stevens, Vice President of the New Jersey Legislative Council

Member of the New Jersey Provincial Council for the Eastern Division
- In office September 18, 1745 – July 2, 1776 (State Constitution adopted)

Personal details
- Born: December 12, 1704 İzmir, Ottoman Empire
- Died: February 23, 1789 (aged 84) Morristown, New Jersey
- Resting place: Mount Kemble
- Spouse(s): Gertrude Bayard, Elizabeth Tuite
- Children: Samuel, Richard, Margaret, Mary, Peter, Stephen, Judith, William, Elizabeth, Robert, Ann
- Occupation: Merchant

Peter Kemble (December 12, 1704 – February 23, 1789) was an American politician from the colonial period who served as president of the New Jersey Provincial Council from 1745 to 1776, the last to hold that office.

== Biography ==
Peter Kemble was born on December 12, 1704, in İzmir, Turkey, to Englishman Richard Kemble, a servant indentured in London to a merchant dealing in trade with the Ottoman Empire (the terms of which required the elder Kemble to spend the last two years of his indenture in the Ottoman Empire), and his wife, a member of the Mavrokordatos family. Peter Kemble remained in İzmir until 1712, when he was sent to school in England. He studied in a classical school in London for six years. His father was apparently well connected politically to be appointed consul at Thessaloniki in 1718 by George I; Richard Kemble remained in Thessaloniki until his death in 1720. It was also in 1718 that Peter Kemble was sent to a distant relative, the Rotterdam wine merchant George Kemble, who initiated Peter into the mercantile trade.

In the winter of 1720–1721, Peter went on a trading voyage from London to Guinea. He returned to London and engaged in business for some years. Around 1730, he traveled to New York and married Gertrude Bayard, who came from a prominent New York family. The couple settled at New Brunswick, New Jersey, where Peter embarked upon a successful business, allowing him to build a house. For several years Peter Kemble remained in New Brunswick. In 1751 he purchased a tract of 1,250 acres near Morristown, New Jersey, where he built a larger house. He called this hilly plantation 'Mount Kemble'. He lived at Mount Kemble until his death on February 23, 1789, at the age of 85. He was buried on his plantation.

== Political activity ==
By commission from George II, dated September 23, 1745, Peter Kemble was appointed a member of the New Jersey Provincial Council as a councillor for the Eastern Division. Upon the death of Robert Hunter Morris, President of Council, on January 27, 1764, Kemble acceded to the presidency as senior councilor; he would serve in that capacity until the abolition of the council.

On December 6, 1775, Governor William Franklin prorogued the New Jersey Legislature until January 3, 1776, but it never met again. On July 2, 1776, the New Jersey Provincial Congress approved a new constitution, and on August 13 a new legislature was elected, with the appointed Provincial Council being succeeded by the elected New Jersey Legislative Council.

During the American Revolutionary War, Peter Kemble remained loyal to The Crown. Due, however, to previous connections with George Washington and other future Revolutionary leaders, he was not harassed, although Continental Army Troops were quartered at Mount Kemble. After the Revolution, unlike other Loyalists, his lands were not confiscated.

== Family ==
Peter Kemble's first wife was Gertrude Bayard, a member of the prominent Bayard family of New York. By this marriage he had five sons and two daughters:

- Samuel Kemble, who pursued a career in the Royal Navy; after the Revolution he settled in London
- Richard Kemble, who remained at Mount Kemble
- Peter Kemble, educated at the College of Philadelphia and went into business
  - Gouverneur Kemble, son of the younger Peter Kemble, was a Democratic Member of Congress from New York.
- Stephen Kemble, educated at the College of Philadelphia and served in the British Army where he attained the rank of Brigadier general, and in 1805 returned to the United States, living in the ancestral family home in New Brunswick, New Jersey
- William Kemble served in the British Army, attaining the rank of Captain.
- Margaret Kemble, the wife of General Thomas Gage
- Judith Kemble, who married businessman Archibald McCall and settled in Philadelphia.

His second wife was Elizabeth Tuite, by whom he had a son and two daughters:

- Robert Kemble, who served in the Commissary Department of the British Army during the Revolution, and retired to Mount Kemble
- Ann Kemble, who never married and lived her life at Mount Kemble
- Elizabeth Kemble, who never married and lived her life at Mount Kemble

Kemble died on February 23, 1789, in Morristown, New Jersey.
