= Oak Hill (James Monroe house) =

Historic house in Virginia, United States

- U.S. National Register of Historic Places
- U.S. National Historic Landmark
- Virginia Landmarks Register
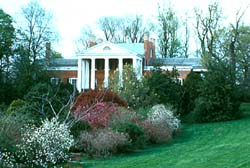
- Front view of Oak Hill

- Location within Northern Virginia Location within Virginia Location within the United States
- Interactive map of Oak Hill
- Nearest city: Leesburg, Virginia
- Coordinates: 38°59′50.85″N 77°37′13.45″W
- Built: 1808
- Architect: James Hoban
- NRHP reference No.: 66000842
- VLR No.: 053-0090

Significant dates
- Added to NRHP: October 15, 1966
- Designated NHL: December 19, 1960
- Designated VLR: September 9, 1969

Oak Hill is a mansion and plantation located in Aldie, Virginia, United States. Built in 1820–1822, it was the home of Founding Father James Monroe, the fifth U.S. President, for 22 years. It is located approximately nine miles (fourteen kilometers) south of Leesburg on U.S. Route 15, in an unincorporated area of Loudoun County, Virginia just north of Gilberts Corner (the intersection of 15 with U.S. Route 50). It is a National Historic Landmark. Since November 2025, Oak Hill has been owned by the Conservation Fund.

== History ==
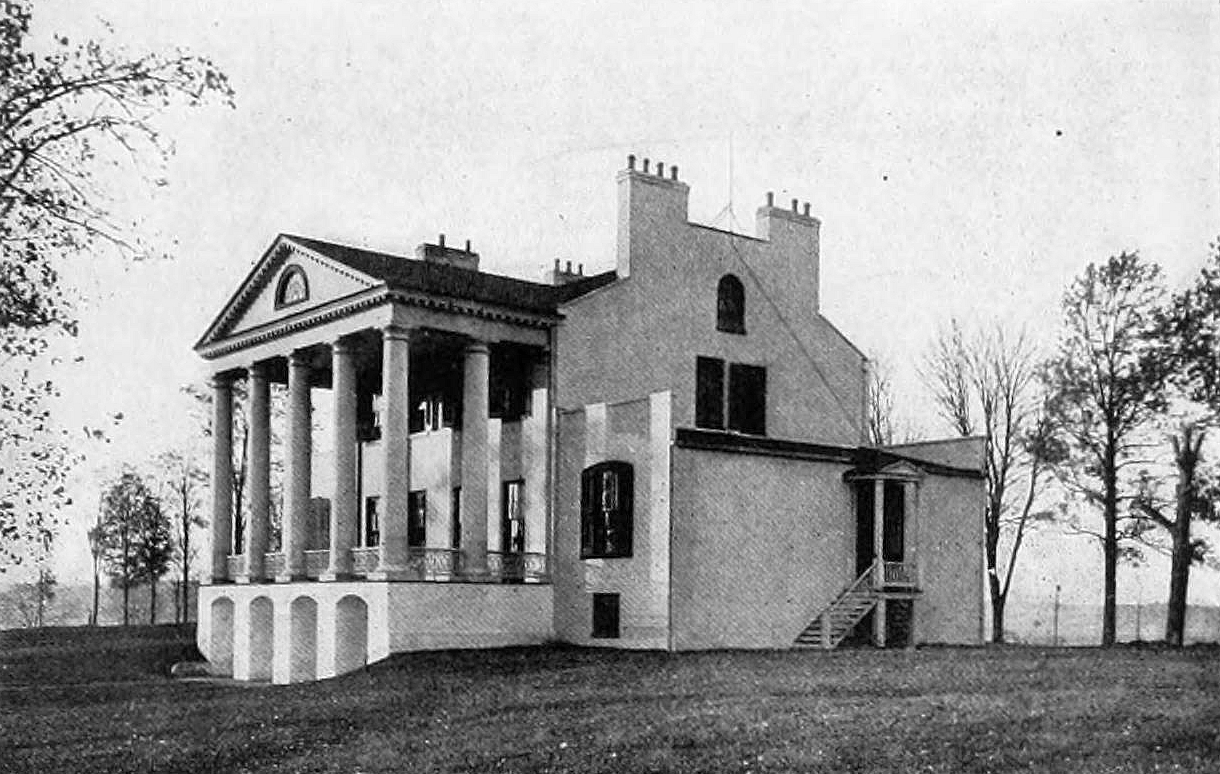
A rear view of the house in 1915

The main mansion of the property was constructed from 1820-1822 by slaves that were owned by James Monroe. Before that, Monroe's residence at the estate was the clapboard building known in recent years as the Monroe Cottage. Monroe subsequently split time between this estate and another home at Monroe Hill on the grounds of the University of Virginia in Charlottesville, Virginia after his term as the nation's fifth president. Oak Hill was Monroe's only residence for three years, from 1827 to 1830, and it was one of his residences during 22 years.

The architecture is distinctive for "its unusual pentastyle portico." It is suggested that Thomas Jefferson, his close friend, may well have drawn plans for Oak Hill; the construction was supervised by James Hoban, designer and builder of the White House. Aside from the main house, other structures remaining from Monroe's time include the cottage, a smokehouse, springhouse, blacksmith's shop, a square barn, the stone Stallion Barn, and possibly the Brick House. The estate is a designated U.S. National Historic Landmark.

=== Monroe's residency ===
Monroe and his uncle Joseph Jones jointly purchased 4,400 acres (18 km^{2}) of land in Loudoun County in 1794. When Jones died without direct heirs in 1805, Monroe gained sole possession of the property. However, Monroe continued to live primarily at Highland, his residence in Albemarle County—until 1826, when he was forced to sell that property to pay debts he had incurred while serving as president.

Monroe had put Oak Hill on the market in 1809, and placed an advertisement in The Washingtonian on December 23 of that year:

LOUDOUN LAND
FOR SALE
For sale on Thursday, the 21st of December next on the premises, the tract of LAND on which the late Judge Jones resided in Loudoun County with about 25 slaves, and the stock of Horses, Cattle, and Hogs, on the estate. The tract contains nearly 2000 acres [8 km^{2}], and possesses many advantages which entitle it to the attention of those who may wish to reside, in that highly improved part of our country. Two merchant mills are in the neighbourhood, one on the adjoining estate, and the other within two miles [3 km]. It is 10 miles [16 km] from Leesburg, 35 [56 km] from Alexandria and 40 [64 km] from Georgetown. The new, Turn-pike from Alexandria crosses a corner of the land, and terminates at the nearest merchant mill. The whole tract is remarkably well watered, Little river passing through the middle of it, and many small streams on each side emptying into that river. About 50 or 60 acres [200,000 or 240,000 m^{2}] are already well set with timothy, and at least 300 acres (1.2 km^{2}) are capable of being made excellent meadow. It will be divided into tracts of different dimensions to suit the convenience of purchasers. A credit of one, two and three years will be allowed. Bonds with approved security, and a trust on the land will be required. The negroes are supposed to be very valuable, some of them being good house servants, and the others, principally, young men and women. For them the same terms of credit will be allowed, and that of a year for every other article.
N.B. The above lands, being yet unsold, notice is given that they will be disposed of, by private sale, upon terms which will be made known on application to Israel Lacy Esq. of Goshen, Col. Armstead T. Mason, near Leesburg, Maj. Charles Fenton Mercer of Leesburg, or to the subscriber, near Milton in Albemarle county.
JAMES MONROE.
December, 23d 1809.

He also attempted to sell the land in 1825, but failed to receive an acceptable bid both times.

In 1822, Monroe began construction on the main house, a two-story brick mansion in the Federal style. He hired James Hoban, the designer of the White House, to serve as architect. Monroe's longtime friend and political mentor Thomas Jefferson offered many design suggestions.

Monroe and his wife, Elizabeth Kortright Monroe, retired to Oak Hill after he finished his second term as president in 1825. In August 1825, the Marquis de Lafayette and President John Quincy Adams were guests of the Monroes there. Elizabeth Monroe died at Oak Hill on September 23, 1830. After her death, Monroe moved to New York City to live with his younger daughter and remained there until his own death on July 4, 1831.

=== Post-Monroe ===
After Monroe's death, the property passed out of the Monroe family. John W. Fairfax, later a lieutenant colonel in the Confederate States Army, bought Oak Hill in 1852. His wife remained there while Fairfax was away fighting in the American Civil War; it was visited by General George Meade of the Union Army on the invitation of Mrs. Fairfax about a week prior to the Battle of Gettysburg. The property passed out of the hands of John Fairfax after the war, but was later repurchased by his eldest son, Henry, a civil engineer and state senator. The estate remained in the Fairfax family until after Henry Fairfax's death in 1916. The mansion was enlarged by the addition of two wings in 1922 while owned by Frank C. Littleton and his wife, but the central facade looks much as it did during Monroe's lifetime. Littleton went bankrupt in 1948, and the estate was purchased by the DeLashmutt family in a foreclosure sale.

It became the residence of Tom and Gayle DeLashmutt and their family following the death of the previous owner, Eugene Reed Prendergast, Mr. DeLashmutt's mother, in 1993. On November 11, 2025, The Conservation Fund announced they had purchased the site.

Two U.S. Navy ships have been named USS Oak Hill after the estate.

==== Potential museum ====
In November 2023, the owners of Oak Hill sent a letter to Charles F. Sams III, Director of the National Park Service, requesting the agency to "explore the suitability of designating Oak Hill, the former home of President James Monroe located in Loudoun County, Virginia, as a unit of the National Park System." If successful, the goal would be to transform the house into a museum by the United States Semiquincentennial in 2026. After legislation to name the estate a national park failed, the owners turned their attention to making it a state park. A proposal to do so failed initially in February 2025, but is expected to be brought before the Virginia legislature again in January 2026, with State Senator Scott Surovell saying that the DeLashmutts "[had] gone above and beyond to minimize the burden on the state," and he hopes "we figure out a way to start the process of making this a reality."

On November 12, 2025, the estate was purchased for a reported $52 million.

== See also ==
- List of residences of presidents of the United States
- List of National Historic Landmarks in Virginia
- National Register of Historic Places listings in Loudoun County, Virginia
- USS Oak Hill

== Sources ==
- Fennell, Christopher. "An Account of James Monroe's Land Holdings." June 18, 2002.
