= Jonathan Gostelowe =

American cabinetmaker (1744/45–1795)

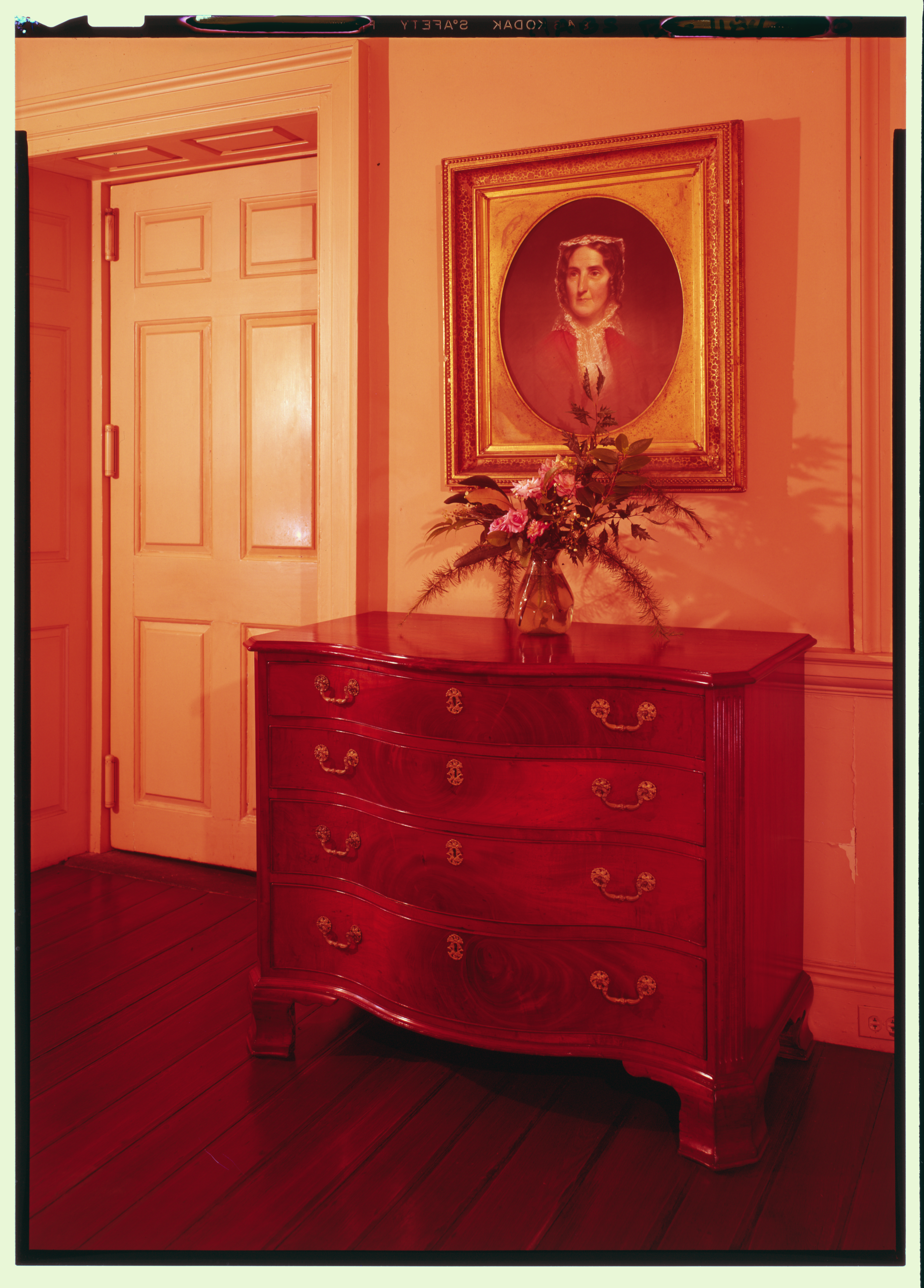
Serpentine chest of drawers (ca. 1781-93), signed by Gostelowe, Cliveden House, Germantown, Philadelphia.

Jonathan Gostelowe (1744 or 1745, Philadelphia, Pennsylvania – 1795, Philadelphia, Pennsylvania) was an 18th-century American cabinetmaker, best remembered for his Philadelphia Chippendale-style furniture.

== Biography ==
He was the eldest of the four children of George Gostelow (1701-1758), a Swedish-American farmer, and his English-born wife Lydia, who lived in the Passyunk section of what is now South Philadelphia. There is no documentation of where the son learned his trade, although, based on stylistic similarities, it is conjectured that he apprenticed under cabinetmaker George Claypoole, Sr. For much of his career, Gostelowe operated a shop on Church Alley between Second and Third Streets in Philadelphia, Pennsylvania.

He married Mary Duffield at Christ Church, Philadelphia on June 16, 1768. She died on May 13, 1770, at age 26.

He served in the 4th Artillery Regiment of the Continental Army during the American Revolutionary War, attaining the rank of major. He was paid for supplying drums to the army, possibly items he made himself. In August 1778, he completed an inventory of all arms and materiel held by the Continental Army in southeastern Pennsylvania. This inventory included illustrations of thirteen standards (regimental flags), which may have represented each of the thirteen Pennsylvania Militia regiments. Design of these flags is attributed to John Henderson. One "Gostelowe List" standard survives in the collection of the Smithsonian Institution.

Painter (and fellow veteran) Charles Willson Peale organized the Grand Federal Procession, an elaborate parade on July 4, 1788, celebrating ratification of the United States Constitution by ten of the former Thirteen Colonies (surpassing the required three-quarters majority). Gostelowe helped to recruit its 5,000 participants, and rode on the float sponsored by his guild, "The Gentlemen Cabinet and Chair Makers of Philadelphia."

He was a contemporary of Philadelphia cabinetmakers Thomas Affleck, Benjamin Randolph and William Savery. Thomas Jones (fl. 1773-1802), of London, served a four-year apprenticeship under Gostelowe beginning in October 1773, and may have kept the shop going during Gostelowe's military service.

He attended Christ Church, Philadelphia, and created some of its fixtures. He became a vestryman in 1792.

He married Elizabeth Towers on April 19, 1789. As a wedding gift, he made her a serpentine chest of drawers and matching dressing table mirror incorporating their initials and the year "1789." The chest of drawers and mirror are now in the Mabel Brady Garvan Collection at Yale University Art Gallery. Gostelowe and his former-apprentice, Thomas Jones, are closely associated with the serpentine chest of drawers form, which was relatively rare in America.

In 1790 he moved his shop to his wife's property at 66-68 High (now Market) Street, where he worked until his retirement in 1793.

Gostelowe died on February 5, 1795, and was buried in Christ Church Burial Ground. In 1798 his widow married Congressman Matthew Locke of North Carolina.

== Examples of his work ==
- Baptismal font (ca. 1765-75), St. Paul's Episcopal Church (defunct), Philadelphia, Pennsylvania.
- Serpentine chest of drawers (ca. 1780–93, attributed to Gostelowe), Winterthur Museum, Winterthur, Delaware.
- Serpentine chest of drawers (ca. 1781–93, signed by Gostelowe), Cliveden House, Germantown, Philadelphia, Pennsylvania.
- Mirror (ca. 1785–90, attributed to Gostelowe), Philadelphia Museum of Art.
- Clothes press (serpentine chest of drawers, with Gostelowe label), State Museum of Pennsylvania, Harrisburg, Pennsylvania.
- Communion table (1788, documented to Gostelowe), Christ Church, Philadelphia, Pennsylvania.
- Baptismal font (1788, signed by Gostelowe), Christ Church, Philadelphia, Pennsylvania.
- Serpentine chest of drawers and dressing table mirror (1789), Yale University Art Gallery, New Haven, Connecticut. Gostelowe's wedding gift to his second wife.
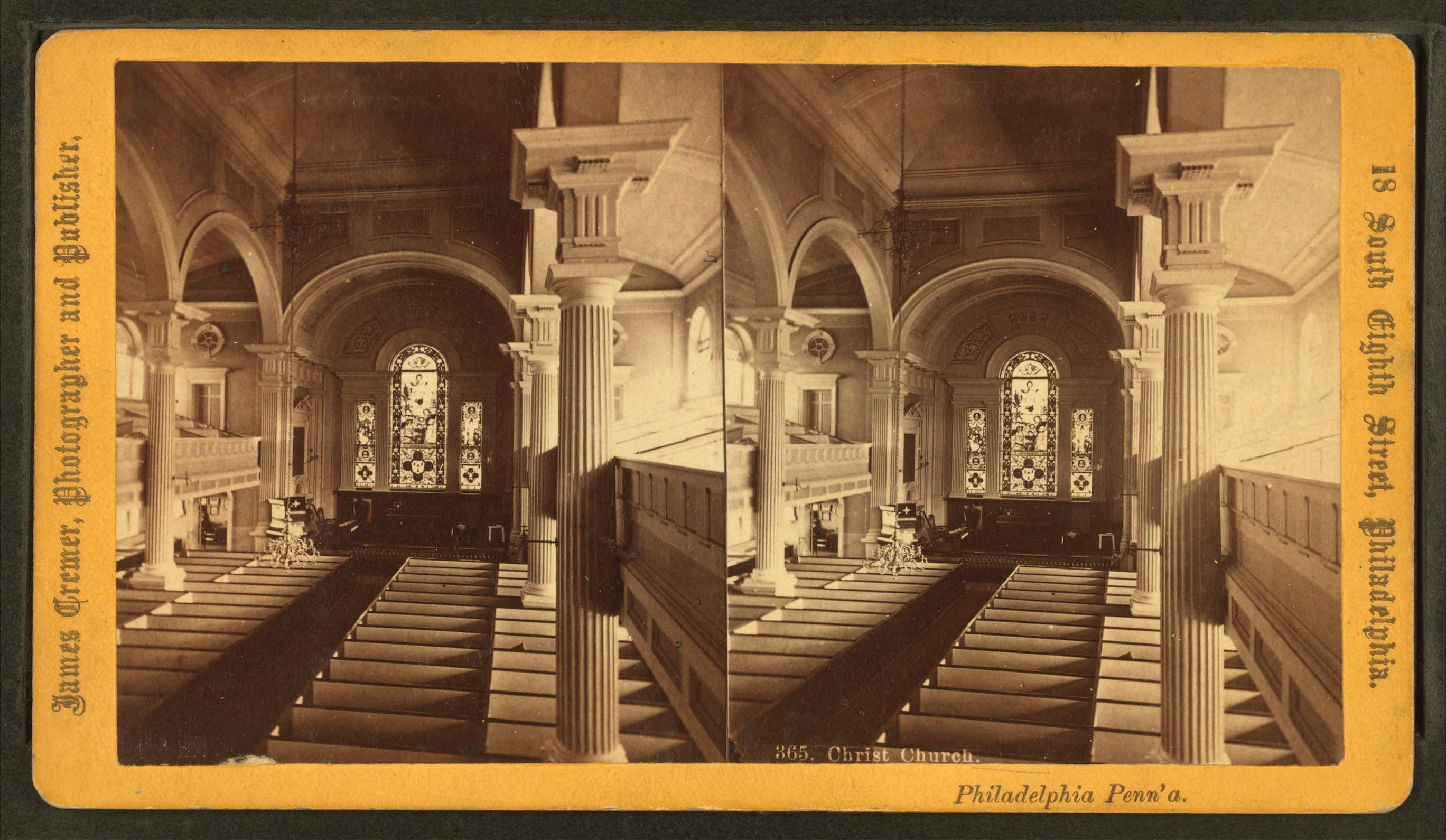
Interior of Christ Church, Philadelphia. Gostelowe made the communion table under the central window.

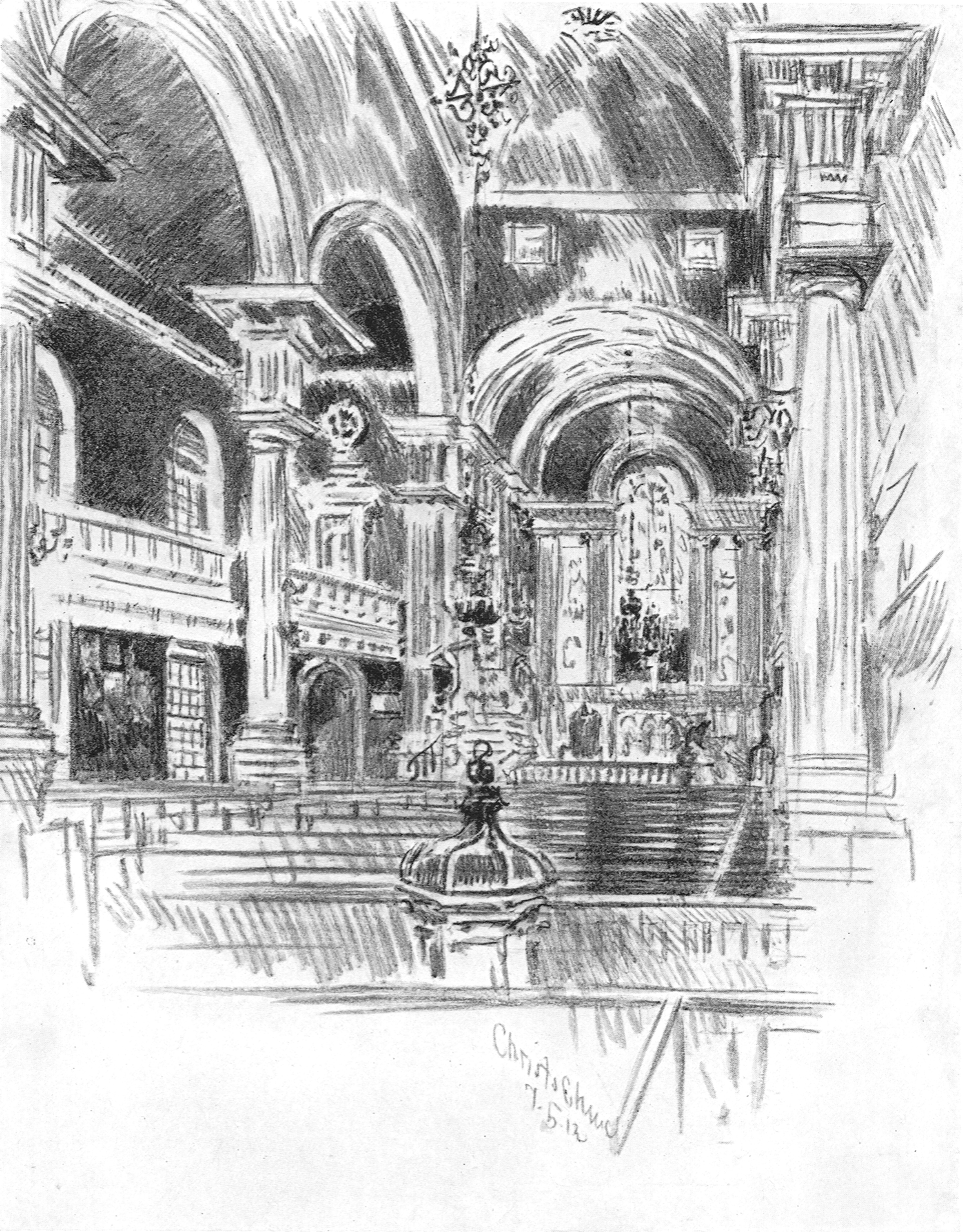
"Interior of Christ Church, Philadelphia" (1914) by Joseph Pennell. Gostelowe's baptismal font is in the foreground.

Christ Church baptismal font, measured drawings (left).
