= Benjamin Randolph =

Benjamin Randolph may refer to:

- Benjamin Randolph (cabinetmaker) (1721–1791), American cabinetmaker
- Benjamin F. Randolph (1820–1868), African American educator, Methodist minister and politician
