= Thomas Affleck =

Thomas Affleck may refer to:

- Thomas Affleck (cabinetmaker) (1740–1795), American cabinetmaker
- Thomas Affleck (planter) (1812–1868), Scottish-American nurseryman, agrarian writer and Southern planter
- Thomas Affleck Greeves (artist) (1917-1997), British artist and conservationist
