= Christ Church (Philadelphia) =

Historic church in Pennsylvania, United States

- U.S. National Register of Historic Places
- U.S. National Historic Landmark
- Pennsylvania state historical marker
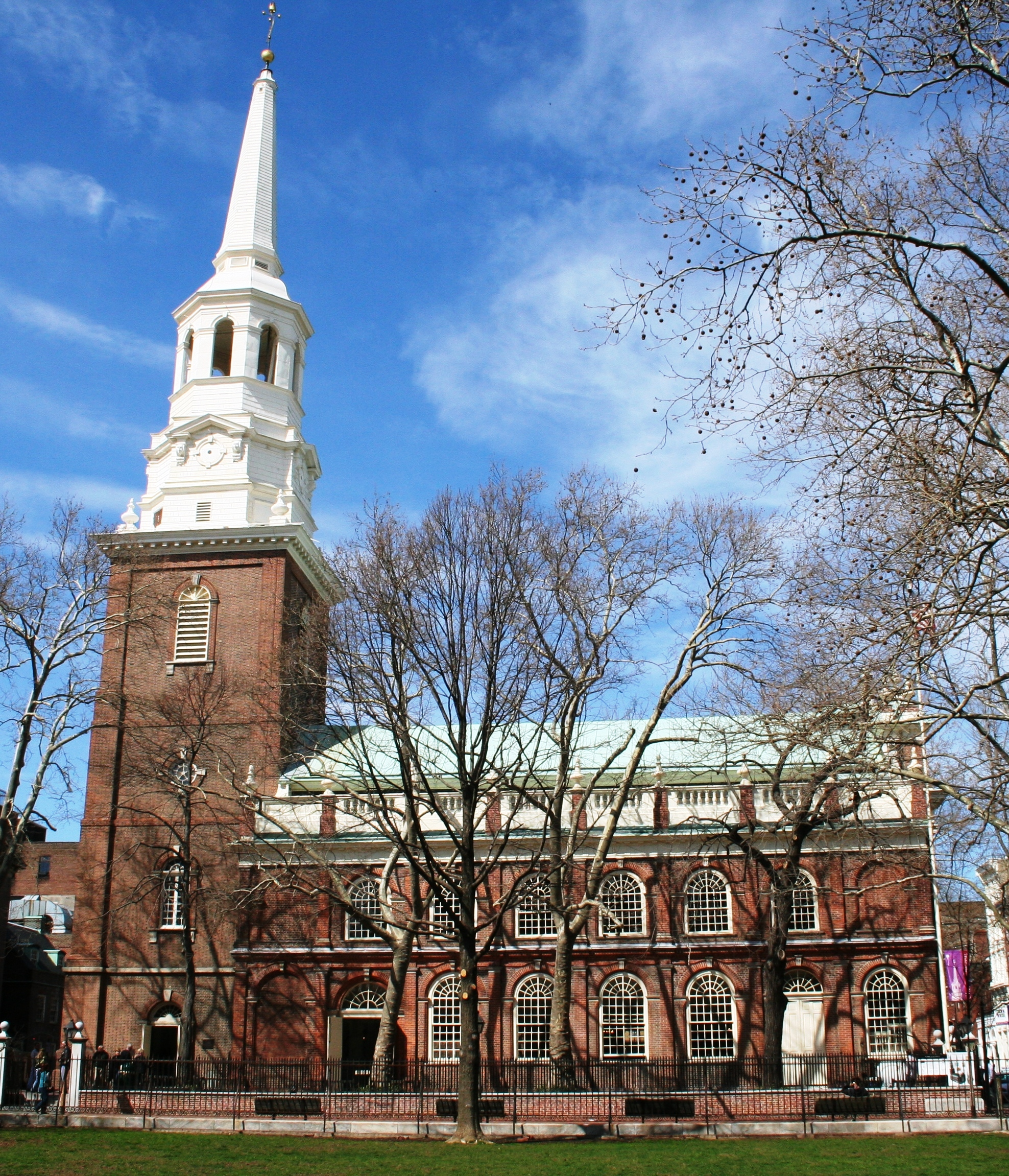

- Location within Pennsylvania
- Interactive map showing the location of Christ Church
- Location: 24 North 2nd St. Philadelphia, Pennsylvania, U.S.
- Coordinates: 39°57′03″N 75°8′38″W
- Built: 1727–1744
- Architect: John Kearsley (supervisor)
- Architectural style: Georgian
- NRHP reference No.: 70000553

Significant dates
- Added to NRHP: April 15, 1970
- Designated NHL: April 15, 1970
- Designated PHMC: December 17, 1954

Christ Church is an Episcopal church in the Old City neighborhood of Philadelphia, Pennsylvania, United States. Founded in 1695 as a parish of the Church of England, it played an integral role in the founding of the Protestant Episcopal Church in the United States. In 1785, its rector, William White, became the first Presiding Bishop of the Episcopal Church.

== History ==
=== 17th century ===
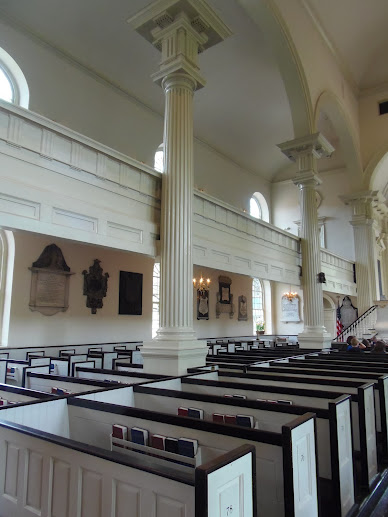
The church's interior in 2012

Christ Church was founded in 1695 by members of the Church of England, who built a small wooden church on the site by the next year. In 1700, Evan Evans traveled from Wales to become their rector.

When the congregation outgrew the original building 20 years after its construction, they decided to erect a new church, the most sumptuous in the Thirteen Colonies. The main body of the church was constructed between 1727 and 1744, and the steeple was added in 1754, making it the tallest building in the future United States, at 196 feet (60 m).

Christ Church is considered one of the nation's most beautiful surviving 18th-century structures, a monument to colonial craftsmanship and a handsome example of Georgian architecture. Modeled on the work in London of Christopher Wren, it features a symmetrical, classical façade with arched windows and a simple yet elegant interior with fluted columns and wooden pews. Although the architect of the church is unknown, its construction was supervised by John Kearsley, a physician, who was likely also responsible for the design, possibly with John Harrison. The church was rebuilt in 1777 by Robert Smith, and the interior was altered in 1883 by Thomas Ustick Walter.

The baptismal font in which William Penn was baptized is still in use at Christ Church; it was sent to Philadelphia in 1697 from All Hallows-by-the-Tower in London. Another baptismal font and the communion table were crafted by Philadelphia cabinetmaker Jonathan Gostelowe, who served on the vestry in the 1790s.

=== 18th century ===
Christ Church's congregation included 15 signers of the Declaration of Independence. American Revolutionary War leaders who attended Christ Church include George Washington, Robert Morris, Benjamin Franklin and Betsy Ross after she had been read out of the Quaker meeting house to which she belonged for marrying John Ross, son of an assistant rector at Christ Church.

Brass plaques mark the pews where these individuals once sat. At the convening of the First Continental Congress in September 1774, Rector Jacob Duché was summoned to Carpenters' Hall to lead the opening prayers. During the war, the Reverend William White (1748–1836), rector of Christ Church, served as Chaplain to both the Continental Congress and the United States Senate. In September 1785, clerical and lay deputies from several states met in Christ Church and organized as a general convention, of which White was chosen president. He prepared a draft constitution for the church as well as an address to the archbishops and bishops of the Church of England, asking for the episcopate at their hands. White was also largely responsible for the liturgy and offices of the first American Book of Common Prayer, published in 1789, which were to be submitted to Church of England authorities. At the convention of the Diocese of Pennsylvania in 1786, he was elected its first bishop and sailed for England with Dr. Samuel Provoost of New York, seeking consecration. After passage of a special enabling act by Parliament, White and Provoost were consecrated in early 1787 by the archbishops of Canterbury and York.

Bishop White returned to Philadelphia that Easter Sunday. In 1789, under White's direction, the first meeting of the House of Bishops was held at Christ Church, marking the first true General Convention of the Episcopal Church in the United States of America. White was the first Episcopal Bishop of Pennsylvania and served the congregations of Christ Church and St. Peter's Church for decades. White is buried in the church's chancel.

Christ Church is a National Historic Landmark and a unique historic site that continues its original function as an Episcopal parish. More than 250,000 tourists visit the church each year.

== Notable interments ==
Several notable people are buried in the church and adjacent Christ Church Burial Ground, including:

- Jacob Broom (1752–1810), signer of the U.S. Constitution from Delaware
- Pierce Butler (1744–1822), signer of the U.S. Constitution from South Carolina
- Elizabeth Graeme Fergusson (1739–1801), poet and writer
- John Forbes (1710–1759), British commander during the French and Indian War, who captured Fort Duquesne, advocate for Native Americans, named the city of Pittsburgh
- Benjamin Franklin (1706–1790), Founding Father and polymath
- Andrew Hamilton (1676–1741), lawyer known as "The Philadelphia Lawyer"
- Charles Lee (1731–1782), Continental Army major general during the American Revolutionary War
- Robert Morris (1734–1806), signer of the Declaration of Independence, the Articles of Confederation, and the U.S. Constitution
- John Penn (1729–1795), governor and proprietor of the Province of Pennsylvania
- James Wilson (1742–1798), signer of the Declaration of Independence and U.S. Constitution and U.S. Supreme Court associate justice
- William White (1748–1836), rector of Saint Peter Church and Christ Church, first Episcopal Bishop of Pennsylvania, and first and fourth Presiding Bishop of the Episcopal Church
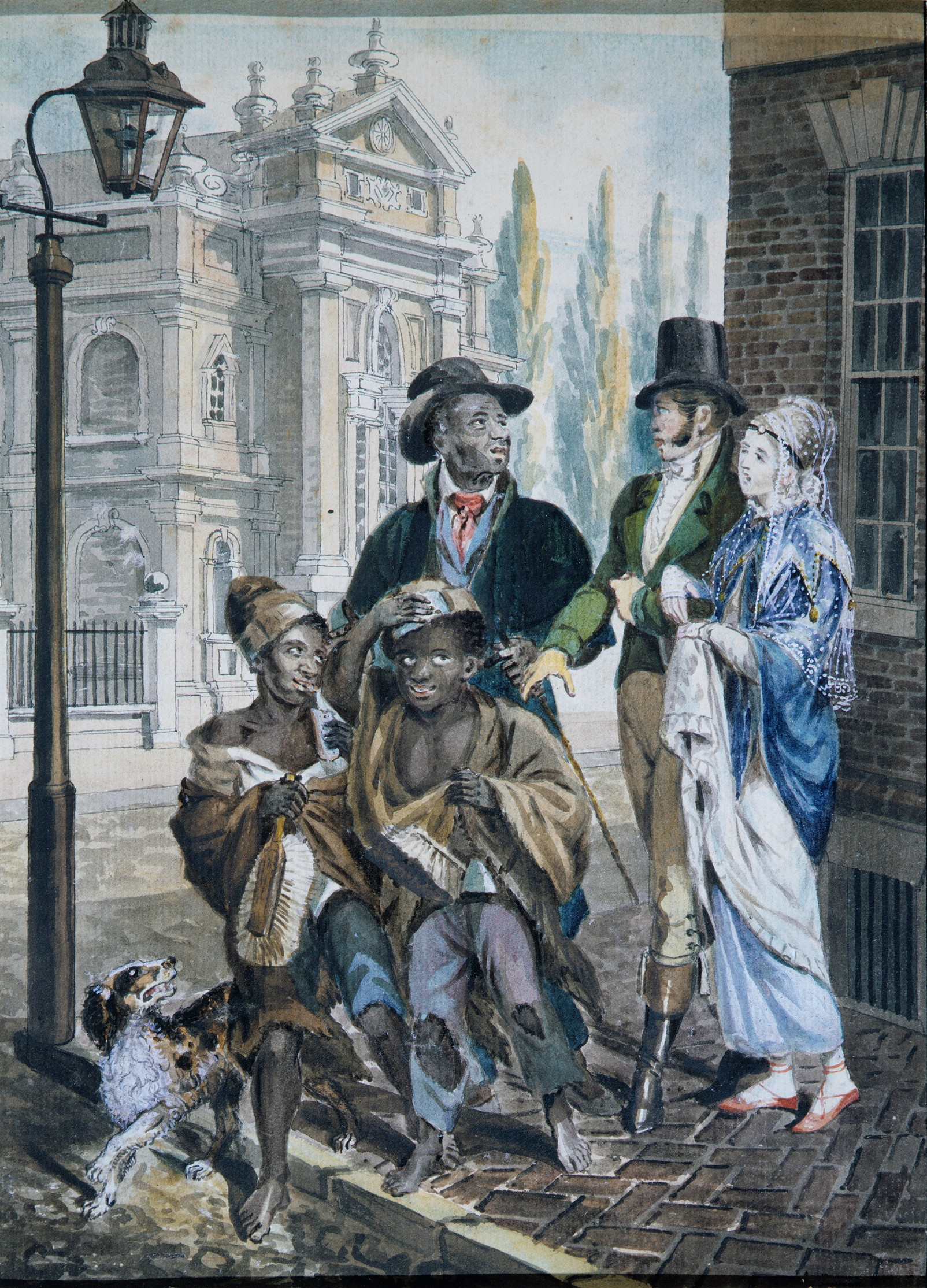
Questioning Chimney Sweeps before Christ Church, a c. 1813 portrait by John Lewis Krimmel

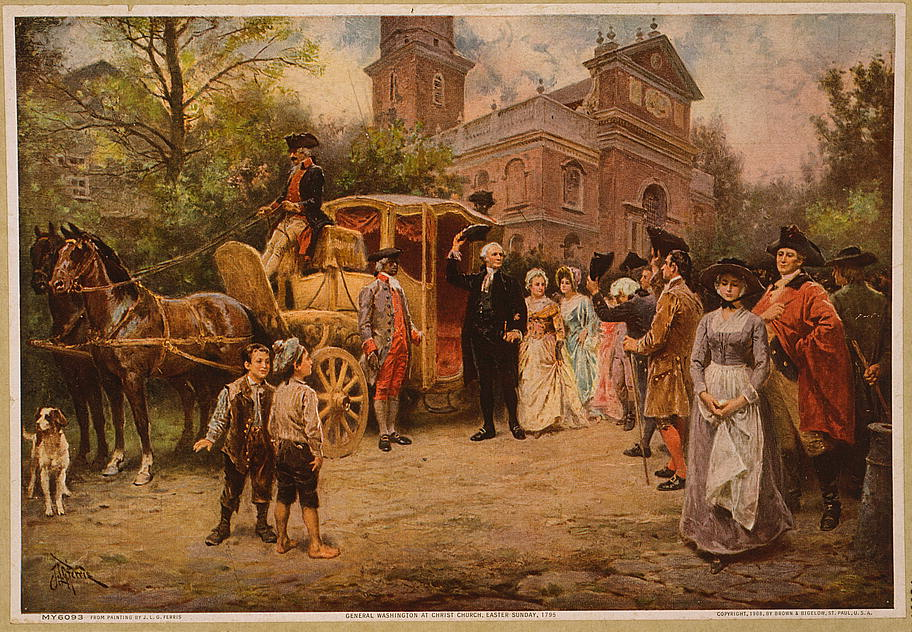
General Washington at Christ Church, a c. 1908 portrait of George Washington by J.L.G. Ferris

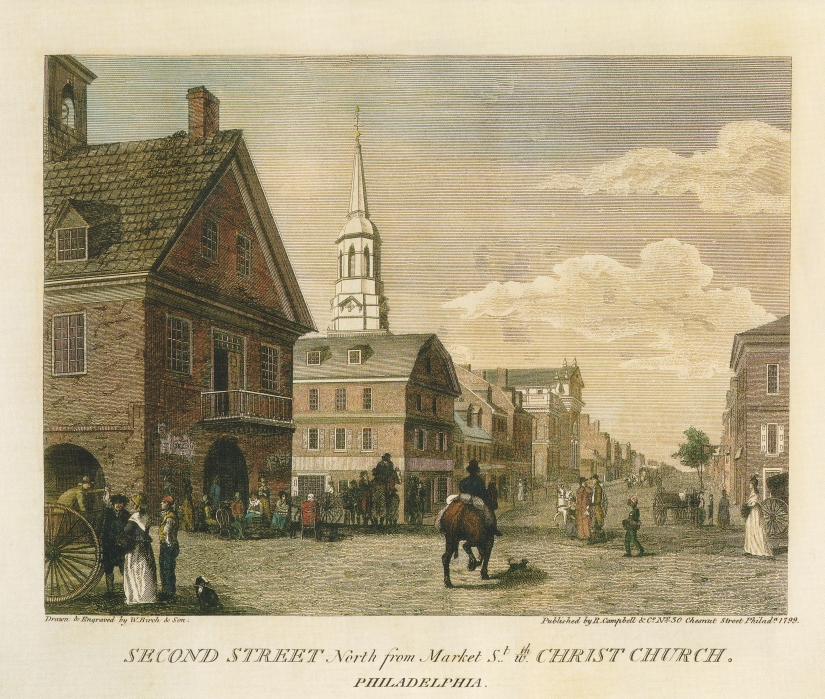
Plate 15 from Birch's Views of Philadelphia, painted in 1800

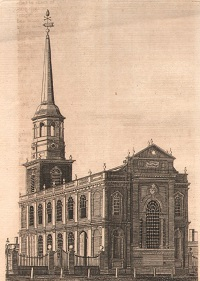
Christ Church, Philadelphia, an 1811 portrait by William Strickland

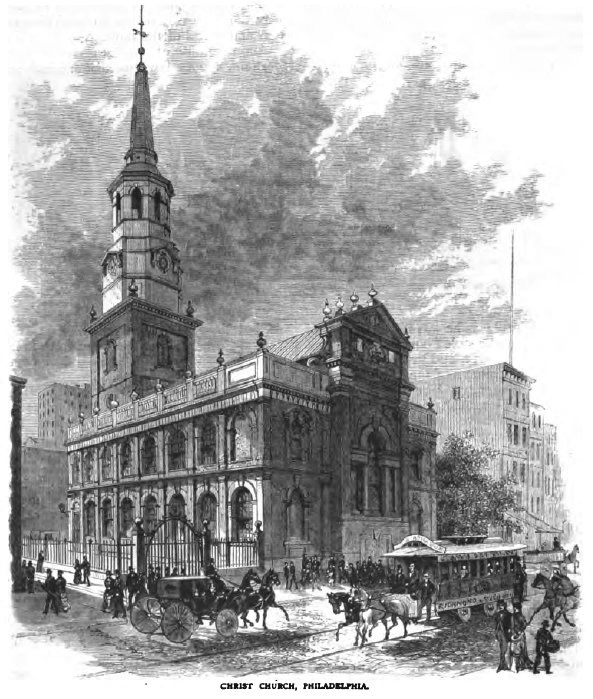
Christ Church (c. 1876)

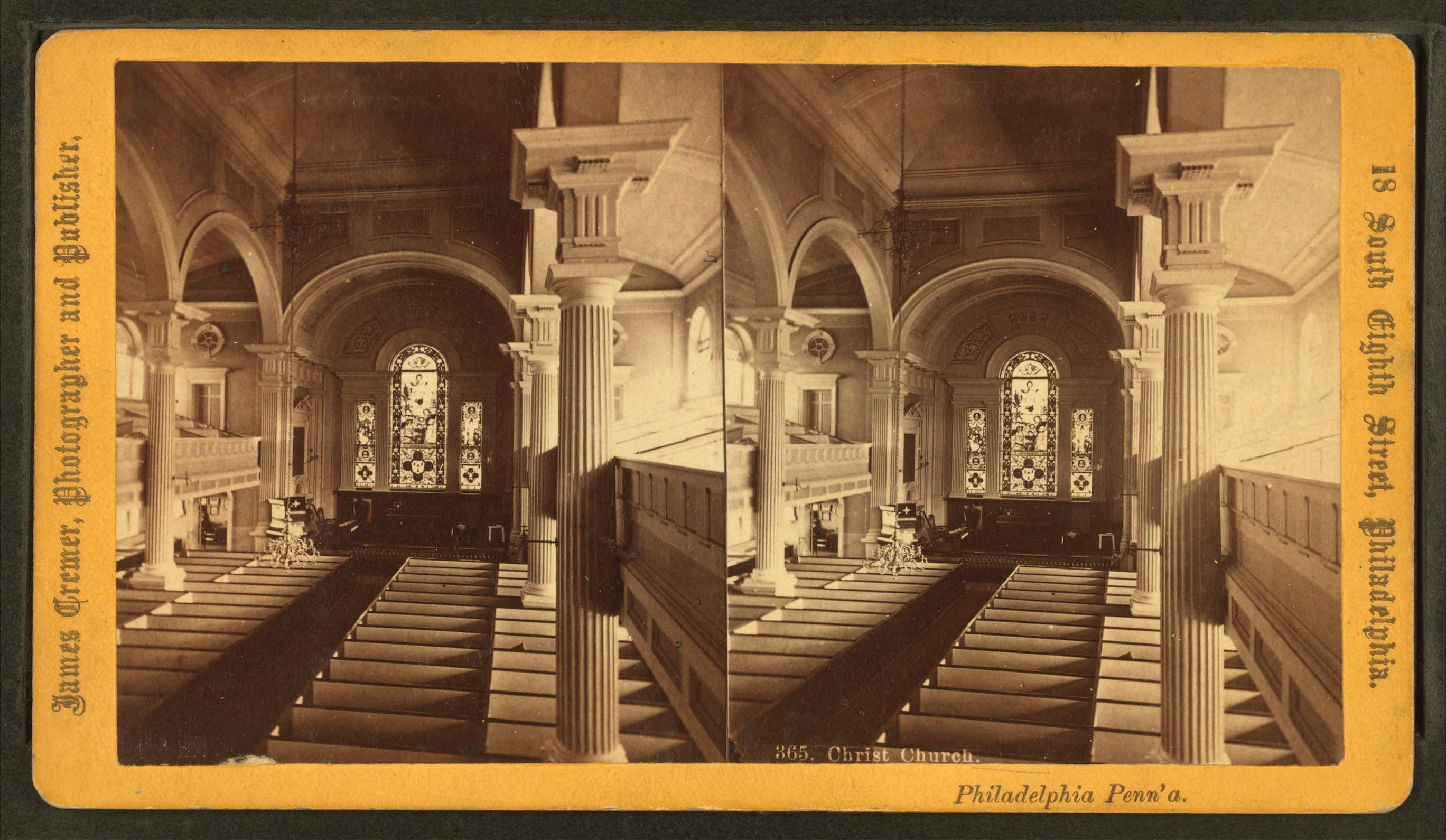
Interior from Christ Church's balcony (c. 1883)

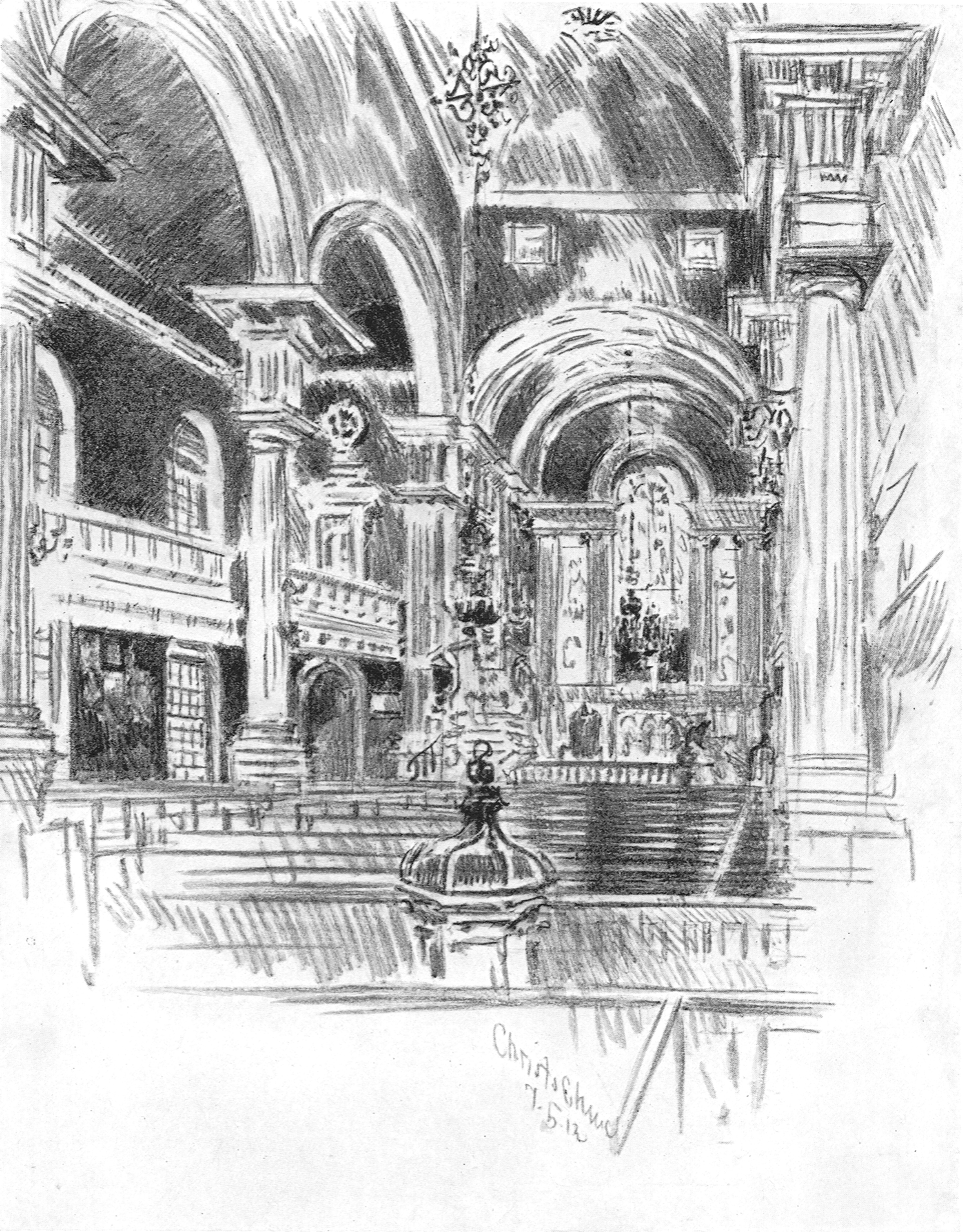
Christ Church Interior, c. 1914, by Joseph Pennell; Gostelowe's baptismal font is in the foreground.

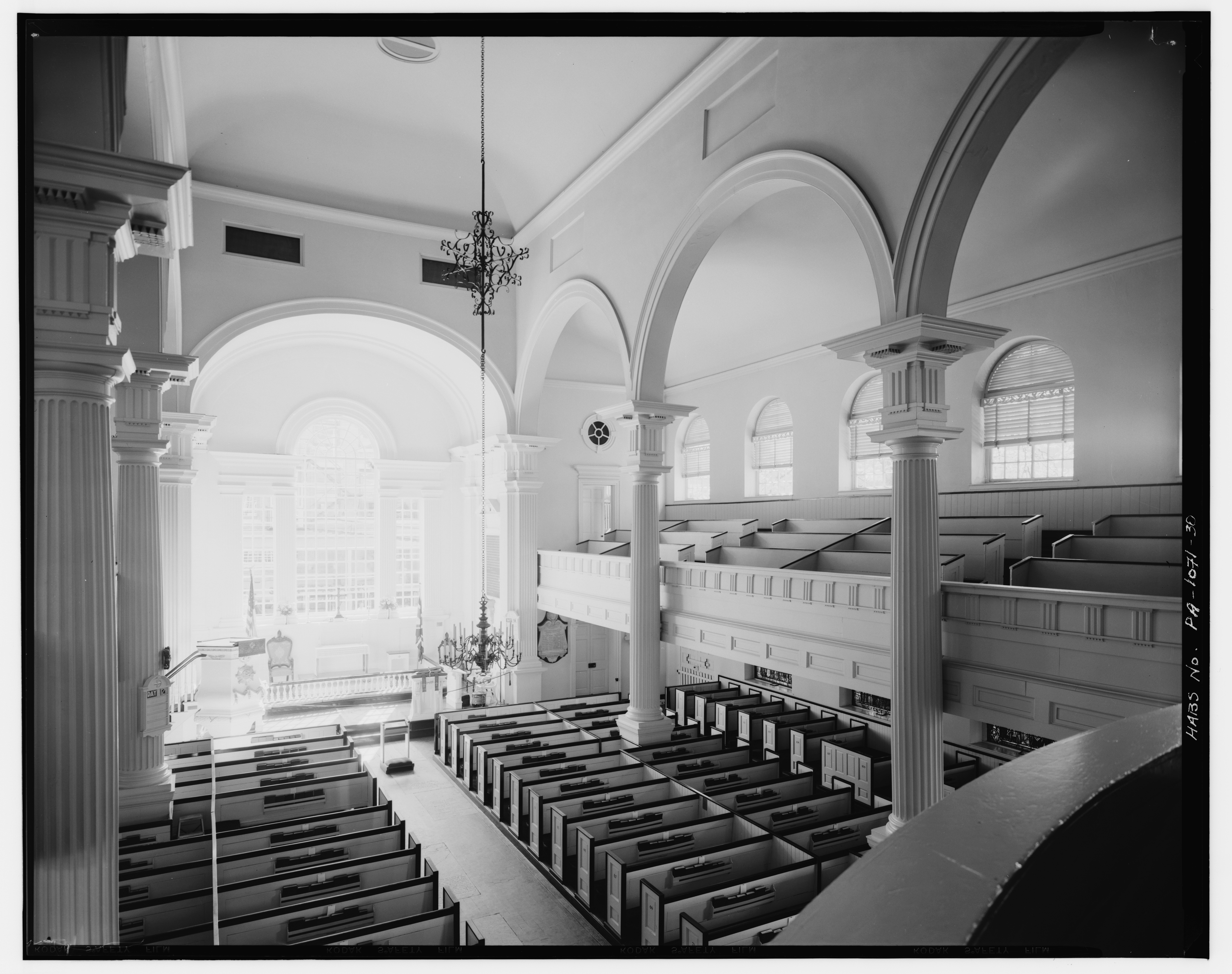
Interior from balcony (c. 1960)

== Other notable events ==
John Inglis was baptized here in September 1744. John Harris Jr. was baptized here on September 22, 1728.

== See also ==
- List of National Historic Landmarks in Philadelphia
- National Register of Historic Places listings in Center City, Philadelphia
- List of burial places of justices of the Supreme Court of the United States

Records
Preceded by Unknown	Tallest building in the United States; 1754–1810; 60 metres (200 ft)	Succeeded by Park Street Church (Boston)
Preceded by Independence Hall	Tallest building in Pennsylvania; 60 metres (200 ft); 1754–1856	Succeeded by Tenth Presbyterian Church
Preceded by Independence Hall	Tallest building in Philadelphia; 60 metres (200 ft); 1754–1856	Succeeded by Tenth Presbyterian Church
