= Thomas Affleck (cabinetmaker) =

American cabinetmaker (1740–1795)

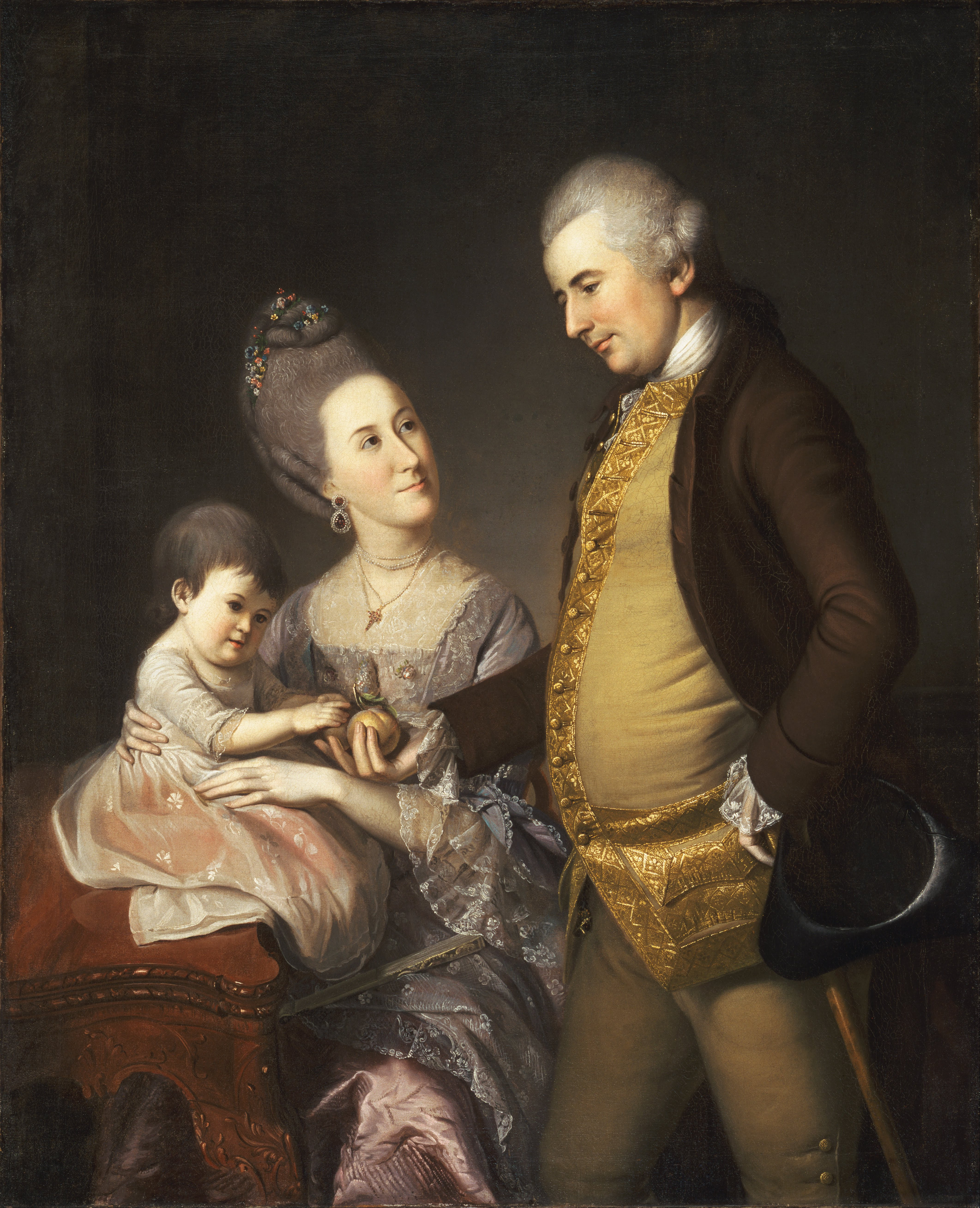
Portrait of John and Elizabeth Cadwalader and their daughter Anne (1772), by Charles Willson Peale. The child is seated on a hairy-paw-foot card table by Affleck. The portrait and table are both at the Philadelphia Museum of Art.

Thomas Affleck (1740–1795) was an 18th-century American cabinetmaker, who specialized in furniture in the Philadelphia Chippendale style.

== Biography ==
He was born in Aberdeen, Scotland to a devout Quaker family. There is no documentation of where he learned his trade, but, based on stylistic similarities to his later work, it is conjectured that he apprenticed under Edinburgh cabinetmaker Alexander Peter. He moved to London in 1760, and immigrated to Philadelphia, Pennsylvania in 1763. That same year, John Penn, a grandson of Pennsylvania's founder William Penn, arrived in Philadelphia and was sworn in as governor of the Colony. One of Affleck's first major commissions came in 1766 for a substantial set of furniture for Governor John Penn and his bride, Anne Allen, daughter of William Allen, the Colony's richest resident.

Affleck's first shop was on Union (now Delancey) Street. By 1768 he had moved to Second Street, south of Dock Creek. In 1771 he married Isabella Gordon, and was censured by his fellow Quakers for marrying "out of Meeting." The couple had six children, four of whom survived to adulthood. Isabella died in 1782, and he never remarried.

Another major commission was for furnishing the Second Street city house of John and Elizabeth Cadwalader. For this Affleck was joined by fellow cabinetmaker Benjamin Randolph, and carvers Hercules Courtenay, John Pollard, Nicholas Bernard, and Martin Jugiez. Cadwalader's receipts for the work survive at the Historical Society of Pennsylvania, although determining which cabinetmaker made which piece (and which carver carved which) sometimes must be based on attribution.

He participated in 1776 protests against war with Great Britain, but it is unclear whether he was a Loyalist, a pacifist, or both. He was deemed a "dangerous person"—along with a number of his fellow Quakers—in August 1777, and banished to Virginia in October. Seven months later he was allowed to return to Philadelphia. He did not fight in the American Revolutionary War on either side.

Merchant Levi Hollingsworth was a patron and friend of Affleck's. A suite of furniture with identically carved legs – twin high chests, matching twin dressing tables, a set of 8 chairs, twin pie-crust tea tables – descended in the Hollingsworth family. During the war, Affleck sometimes traded furniture to Hollingsworth for materials and other goods. One of the pie-crust tea tables was traded to Hollingsworth for a 7-gallon cask of rum.

He moved his shop to Elmslie's Court in 1791. In 1790 Philadelphia became the temporary national capital for a 10-year period, while Washington, D.C. was under construction. Affleck may have made the chairs in Congress Hall for the U.S. House of Representatives and U.S. Senate.

Affleck died in 1795. His eldest son, Lewis, continued as a cabinetmaker.

== Examples of his work ==
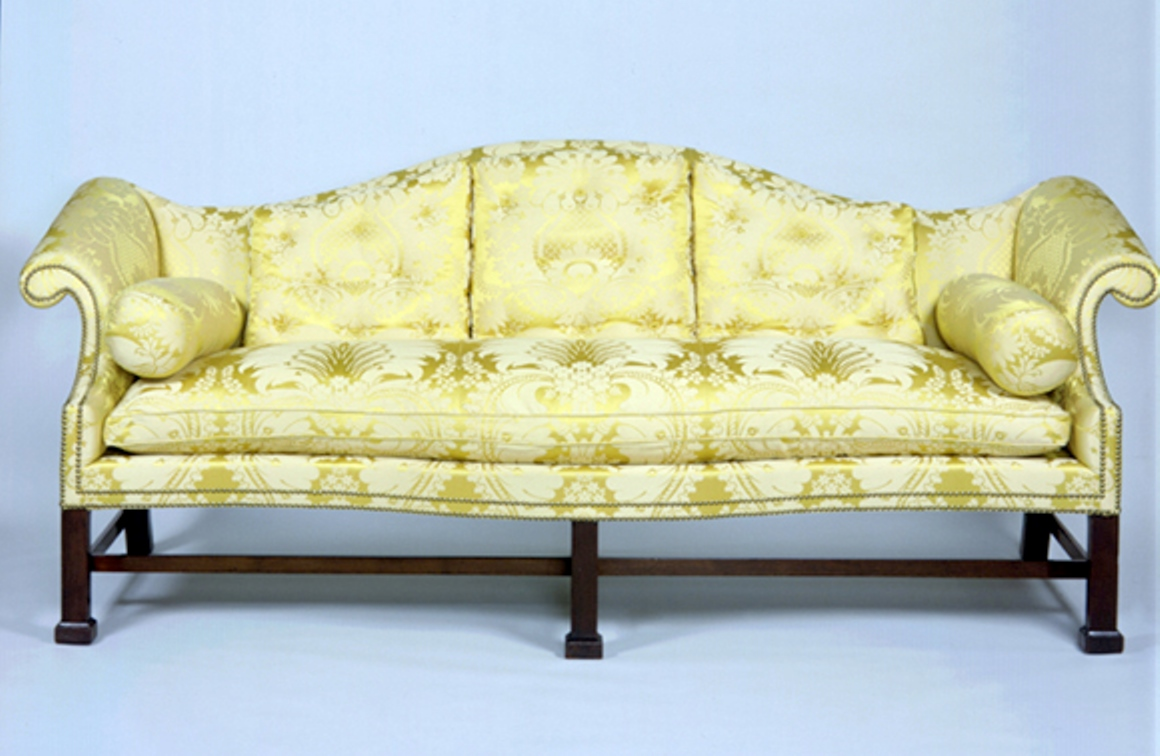
Marlborough-leg camel-back sofa (c. 1775 – 1800), attributed to Affleck, Diplomatic Reception Rooms, U.S. Department of State.

- Card table (1750–75, mahogany, attributed to Affleck), Museum of Fine Arts, Boston.
- Side chair (1760–70, mahogany, attributed to Affleck), Philadelphia Museum of Art.
- Clothes press (1760–90, mahogany, attributed to Affleck), Metropolitan Museum of Art.
- Side chair (c. 1763–72, mahogany, attributed to Affleck), Philadelphia Museum of Art.
- Side chair (c. 1765–75, mahogany, attributed to Affleck), Dayton Art Institute, Dayton, Ohio.
- Marlborough-leg armchair (1765–75, mahogany, attributed to Affleck), Metropolitan Museum of Art.
- Side chair (1765–80, mahogany, possibly by Affleck), Mabel Brady Garvan Collection, Yale University Art Gallery.
- Chest-on-chest (c. 1770, mahogany, attributed to Affleck), Winterthur Museum, Winterthur, Delaware. Made for Vincent Loockerman of Dover, Delaware.
- Chest-on-chest (1770–75, mahogany, attributed to Affleck, carving attributed to James Reynolds), Metropolitan Museum of Art.
- Side chair (1770–75, mahogany, attributed to Affleck), Metropolitan Museum of Art.
- Chest-on-chest (1770–85, mahogany, attributed to Affleck), Philadelphia Museum of Art.
- Chest-on-chest (1775–80), attributed to Affleck, Cliveden, Germantown, Philadelphia.
- Marlborough-leg camel-back sofa (1775–1800, mahogany, attributed to Affleck), Diplomatic Reception Rooms, U.S. Department of State, Washington, D.C.
- Senate armchair (1790–93, mahogany, possibly made by Affleck), Philadelphia Museum of Art.
- House of Representatives armchair (1794, mahogany, attributed to Affleck), Metropolitan Museum of Art.

=== Governor John Penn furniture ===
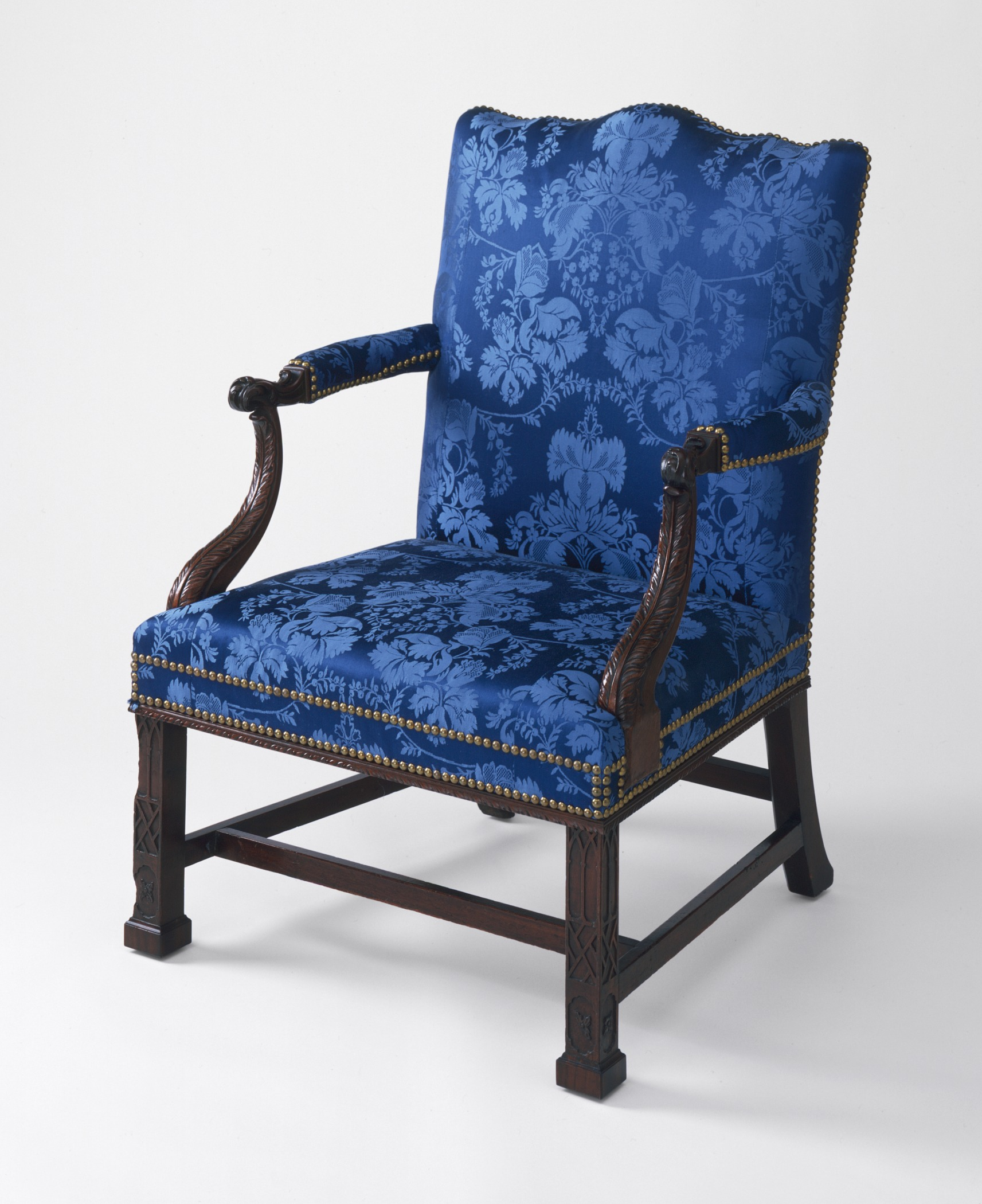
Marlborough-leg armchair (c. 1766), Los Angeles County Museum of Art. Made for Governor John Penn.

- Marlborough-leg camel-back sofa (c. 1766, mahogany, attributed to Affleck), Cliveden, Germantown, Philadelphia. Believed to be part of the furnishings made for Governor John Penn.
- Pair of Marlborough-leg armchairs (c. 1766, mahogany, attributed to Affleck), Independence Hall, Philadelphia, Pennsylvania.
- Pair of Marlborough-leg armchairs (c. 1766, mahogany, attributed to Affleck), Philadelphia Museum of Art.
- Pair of Marlborough-leg armchairs (c. 1766, mahogany, attributed to Affleck), Diplomatic Reception Rooms, U.S. Department of State, Washington, D.C.
- Pair of Marlborough-leg armchairs (c. 1766, mahogany, attributed to Affleck), Metropolitan Museum of Art.
- Marlborough-leg armchair (c. 1766, mahogany, attributed to Affleck), Winterthur Museum.
- Marlborough-leg armchair (c. 1766, mahogany, attributed to Affleck), Museum of Fine Arts, Houston.
- Marlborough-leg armchair (c. 1766, mahogany, attributed to Affleck), Los Angeles County Museum of Art.

Three additional Marlborough-leg armchairs from the set are in private collections. One sold at Christie's New York in 2007 for $1,049,000.

=== Cadwalader furniture ===
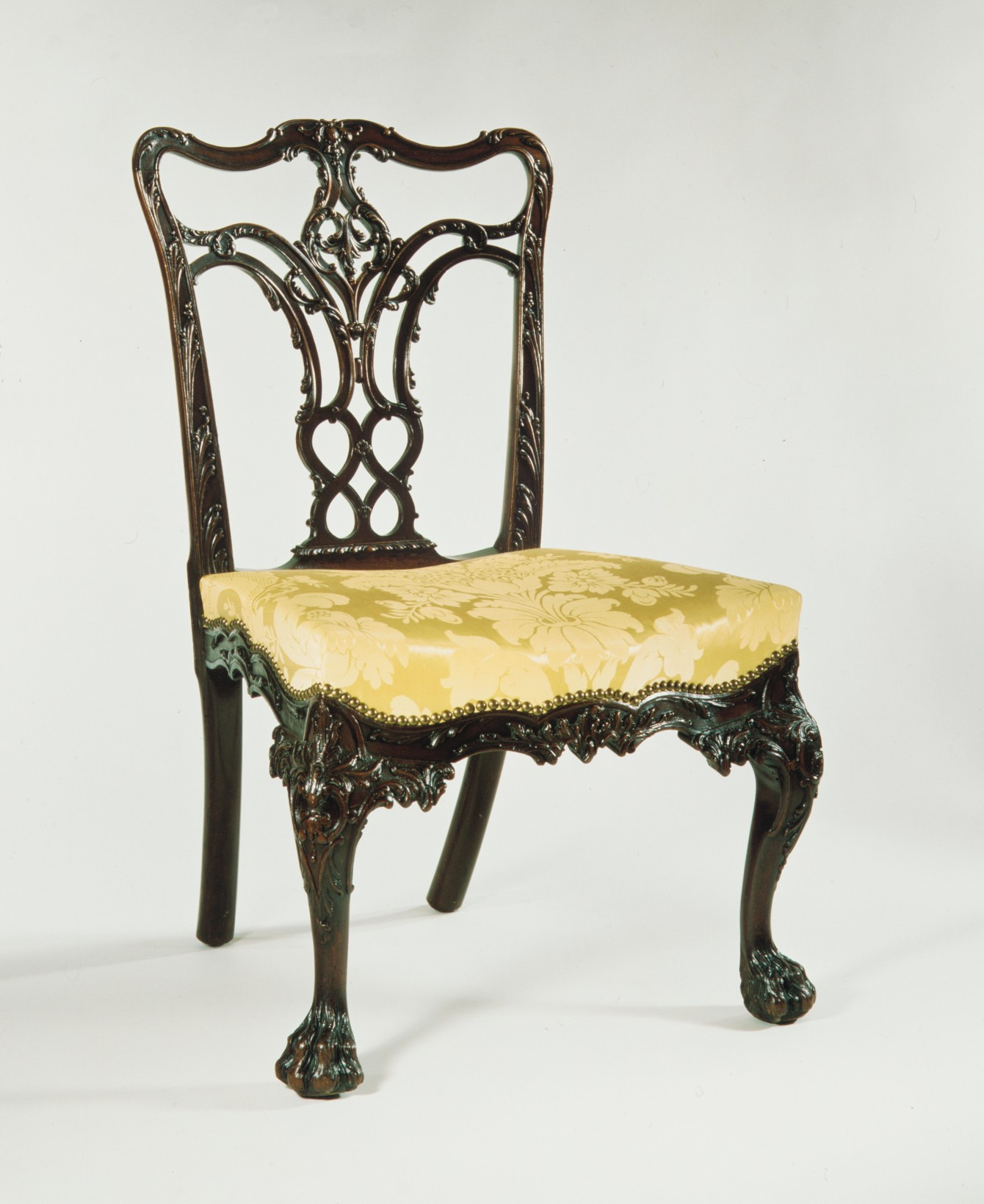
Hairy-paw-foot side chair (c. 1770, mahogany), Metropolitan Museum of Art. Made for General John Cadwalader.

Made for John and Elizabeth Cadwalader. The furniture consisted of at least thirteen chairs, a pair of serpentine-front sofas, a pair of card tables, an easy chair, and four fire screens.

- Hairy-paw-foot side chair (c. 1770, mahogany), Metropolitan Museum of Art.
- Hairy-paw-foot easy chair (1770–71, mahogany), Philadelphia Museum of Art. Set a world auction record for a piece of furniture when it was sold at Sotheby's New York in 1987 for $2,750,000. Donated to the Philadelphia Museum of Art in 2002.
- Hairy-paw-foot card table (1770–71, mahogany), Philadelphia Museum of Art.
- Hairy-paw-foot card table (1770–71, mahogany), Dietrich Americana Foundation, Reading, Pennsylvania.
- Hairy-paw-foot fire screen (about 1770, mahogany), Metropolitan Museum of Art.
- Hairy-paw-foot fire screen (1771, mahogany), Philadelphia Museum of Art.
- Hairy-paw-foot fire screen (1771, mahogany), Winterthur Museum, Winterthur, Delaware.
- Hairy-paw-foot fire screen (1771, mahogany), private collection.

=== Levi Hollingsworth furniture ===
- Twin high chests (1765–75, walnut, attributed to Affleck). One is at the Philadelphia Museum of Art; the other was auctioned at Christie's New York, 16 January 1998; now in a private collection.
- Twin dressing tables (1765–75, walnut, attributed to Affleck). One is at the Philadelphia Museum of Art; the other was auctioned at Christie's New York, 16 January 1998; now in a private collection.
- Camel-back sofa (c. 1768, mahogany with yellow upholstery, possibly by Affleck), Philadelphia Museum of Art.
- Set of 8 chairs (1779, mahogany, documented to Affleck). One chair is a promised gift to the Philadelphia Museum of Art; another chair was auctioned at Christie's New York, 16 January 1998, now in a private collection; other chairs in private collections.
- Pie-crust tea table (1779, mahogany, documented to Affleck), auctioned at Christie's New York, 26 January 1995, realized $398,500; now in a private collection.
- Pie-crust tea table (1779, mahogany, documented to Affleck), deaccessioned from Philadelphia Museum of Art, 2012; auctioned at Sotheby's New York, 25 January 2013, realized $146,500; now in a private collection.
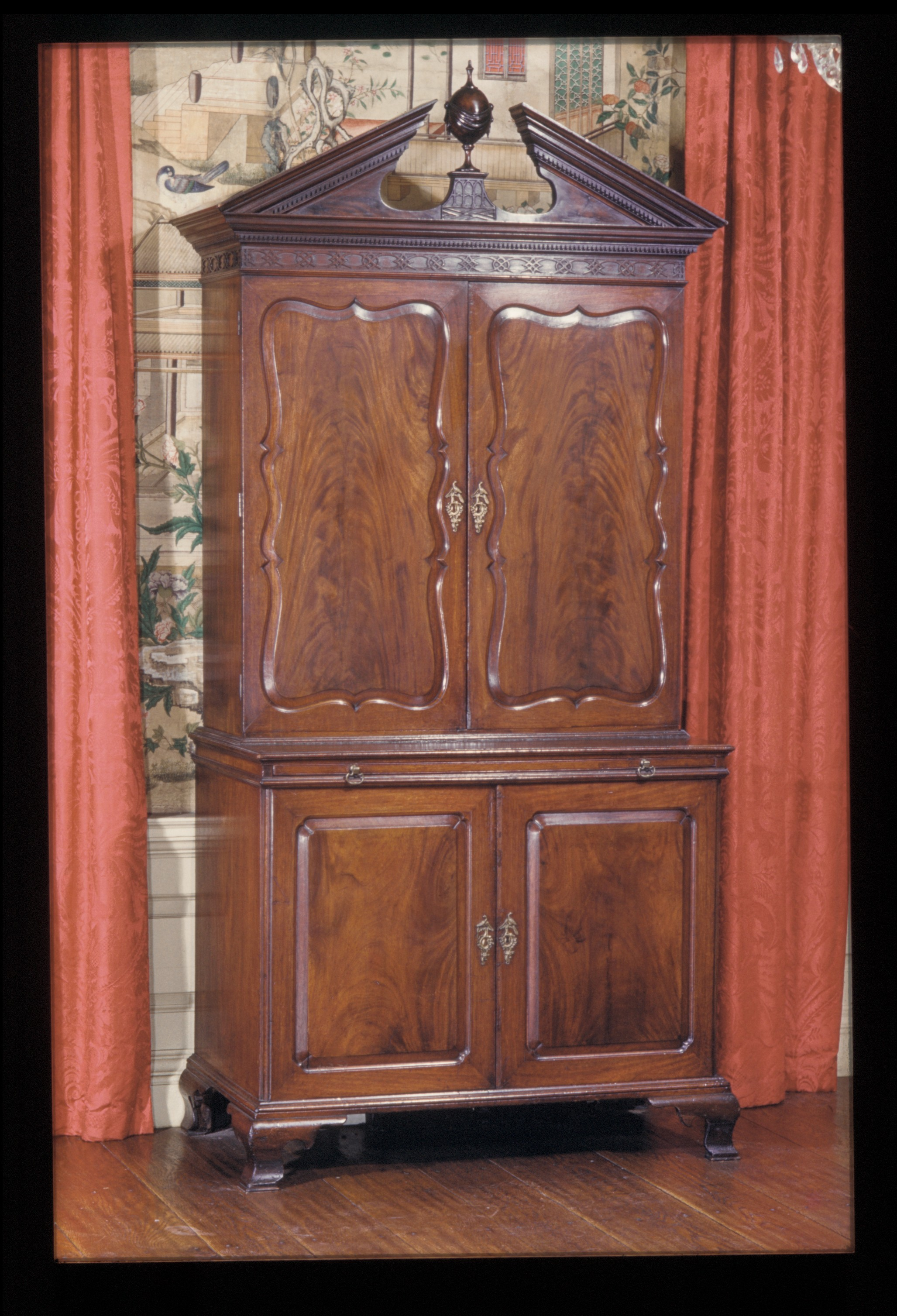
Clothes press (c. 1760-80), Metropolitan Museum of Art.

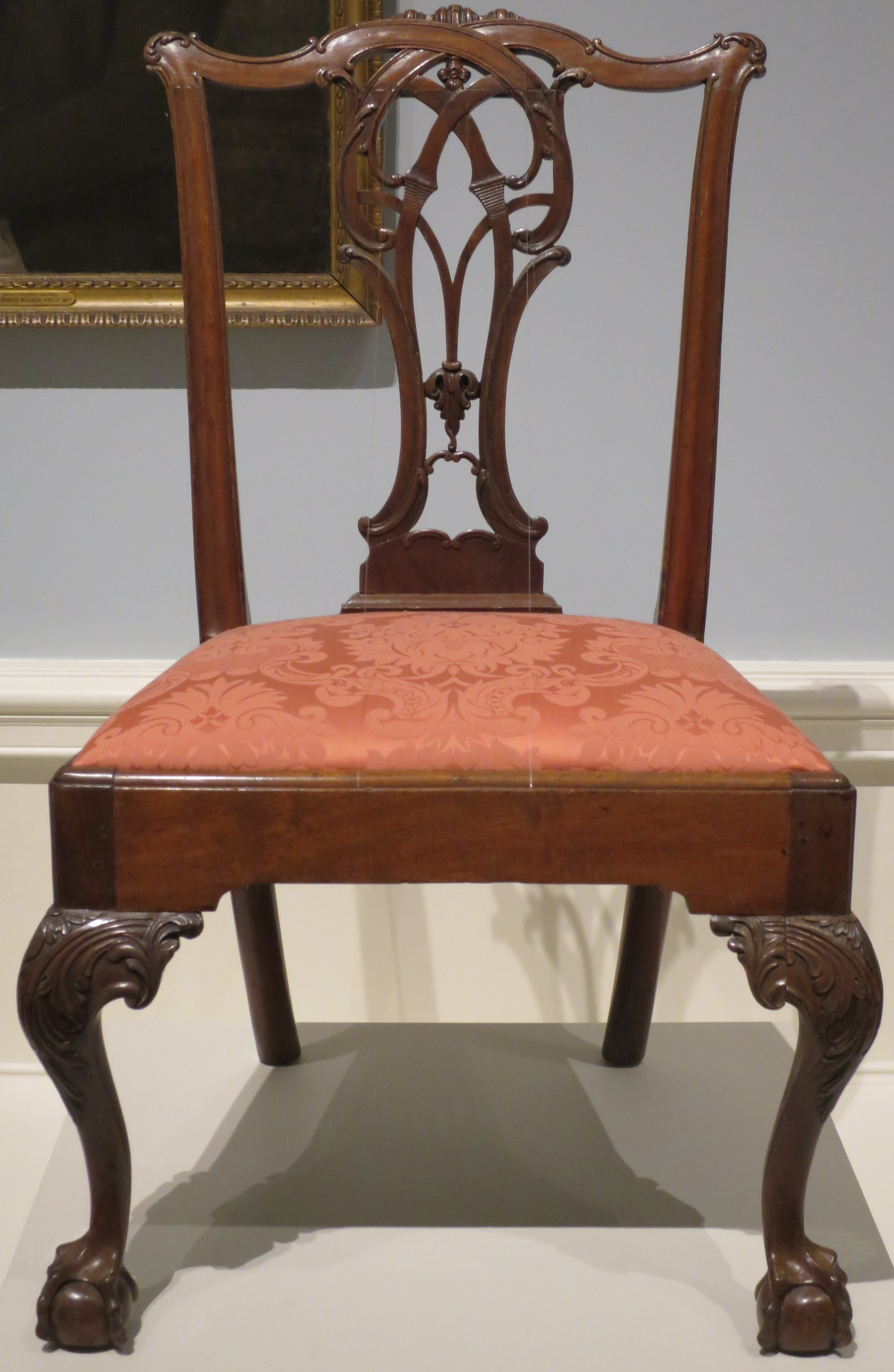
Side chair (c. 1765–75), Dayton Art Institute, Dayton, Ohio. Part of the set made for Levi Hollingsworth.

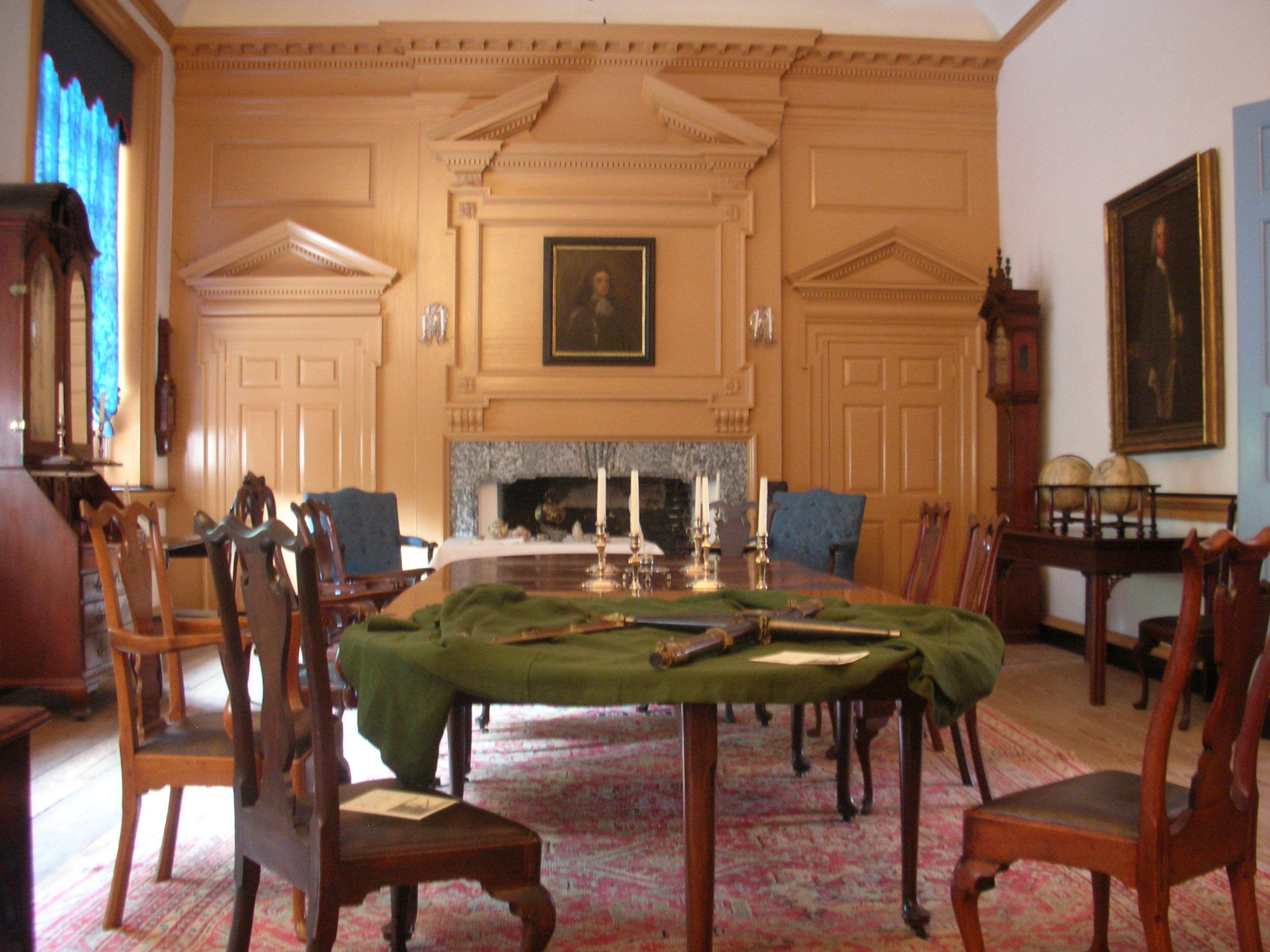
Governor's Council Chamber, Independence Hall, Philadelphia, Pennsylvania. The blue Marlborough-leg armchairs are believed to have been part of the set made for Governor John Penn.

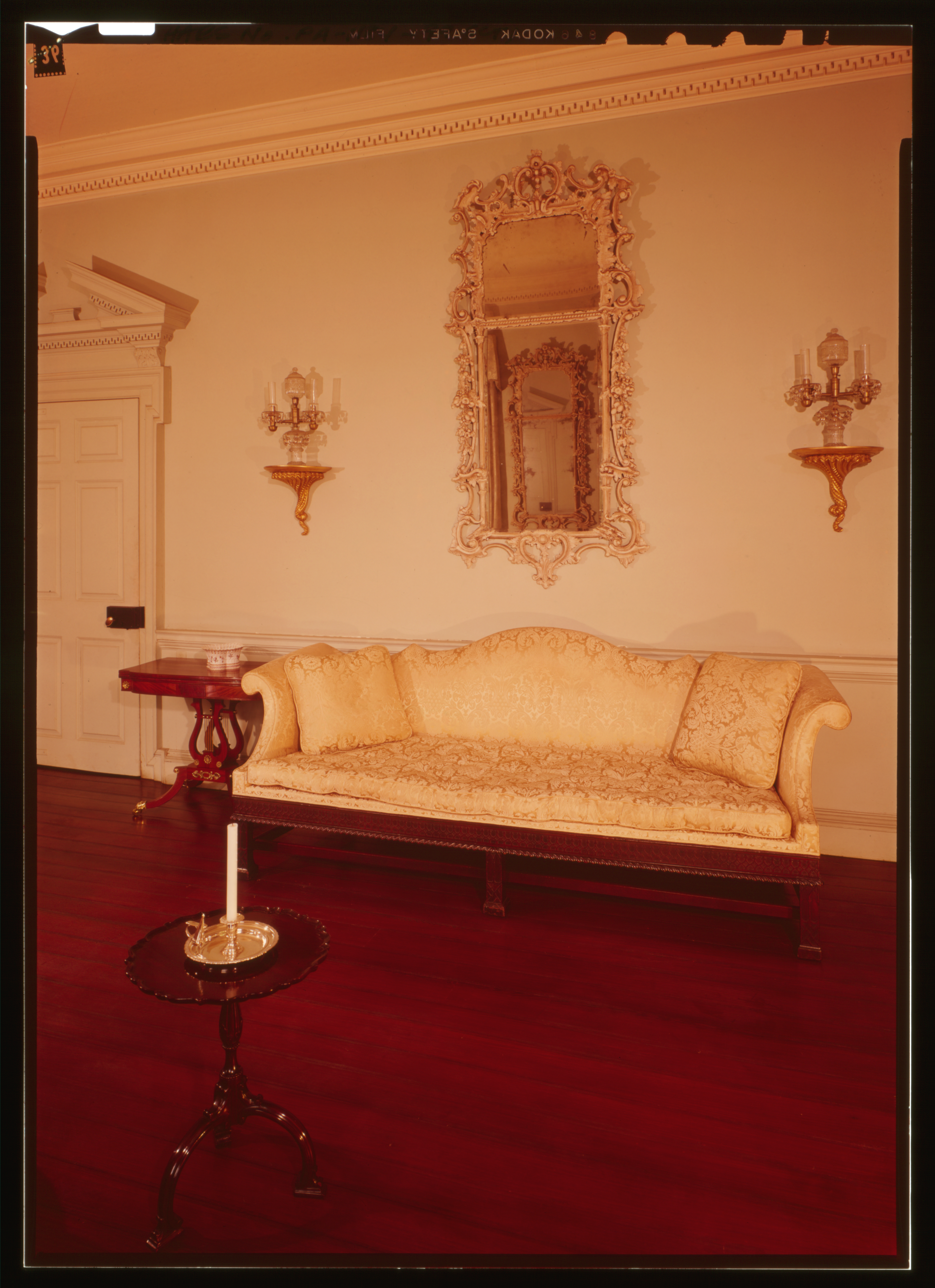
Marlborough-leg camel-back sofa (c. 1766), Cliveden, Germantown, Philadelphia. Possibly made for Governor John Penn.

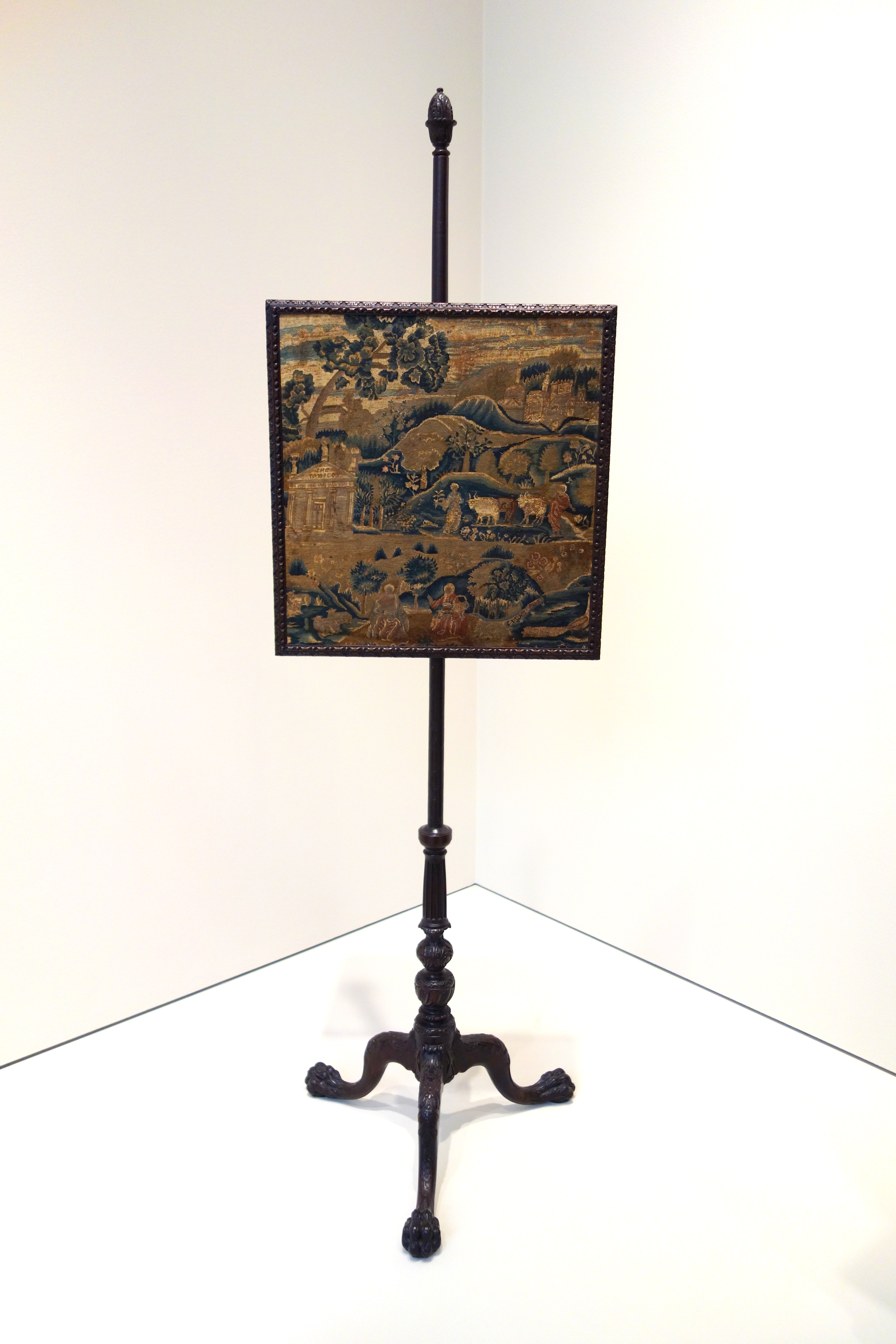
Firescreen (c. 1770-75), Chazen Museum of Art, Madison, Wisconsin.

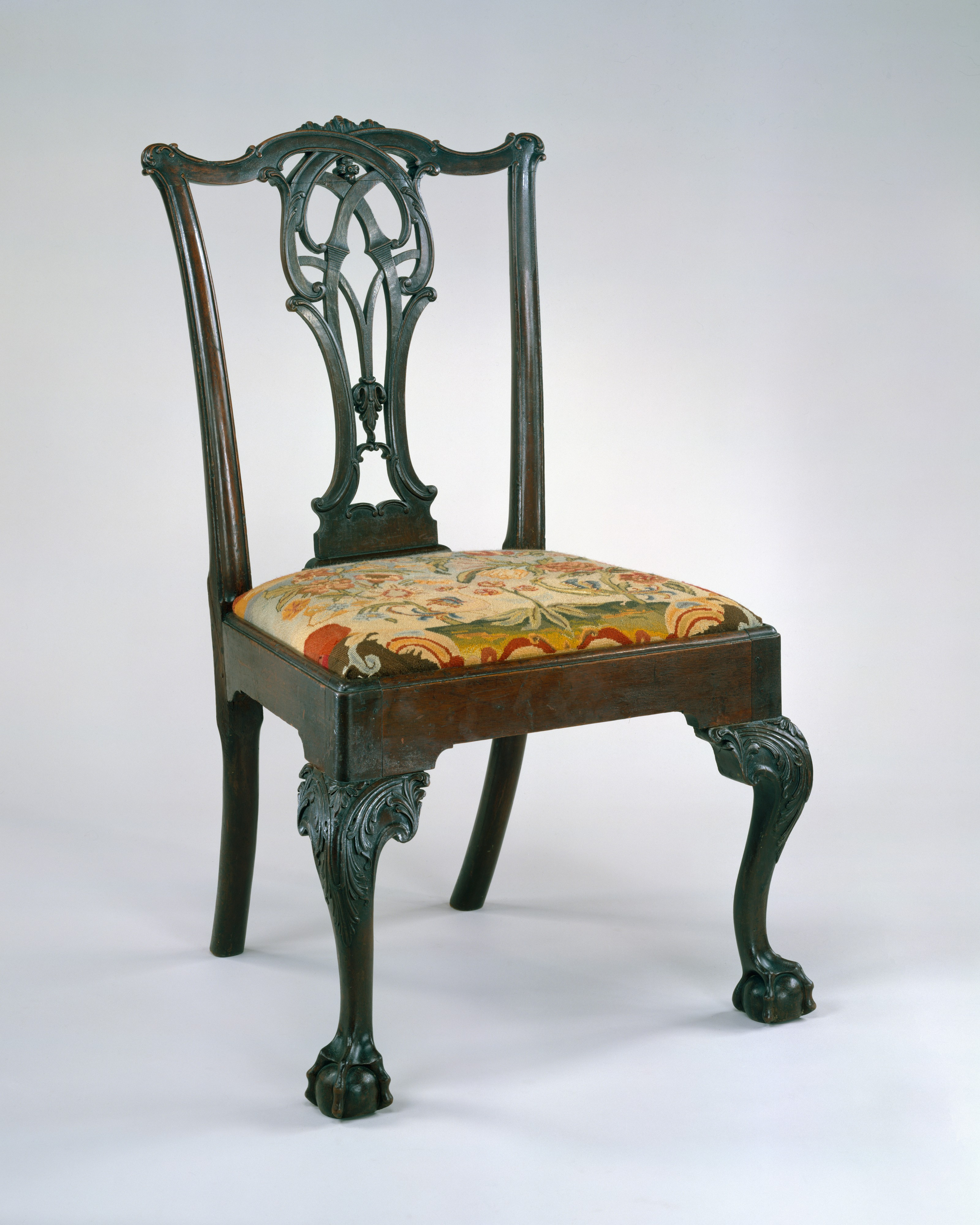
Side chair (c. 1770-75), Metropolitan Museum of Art.

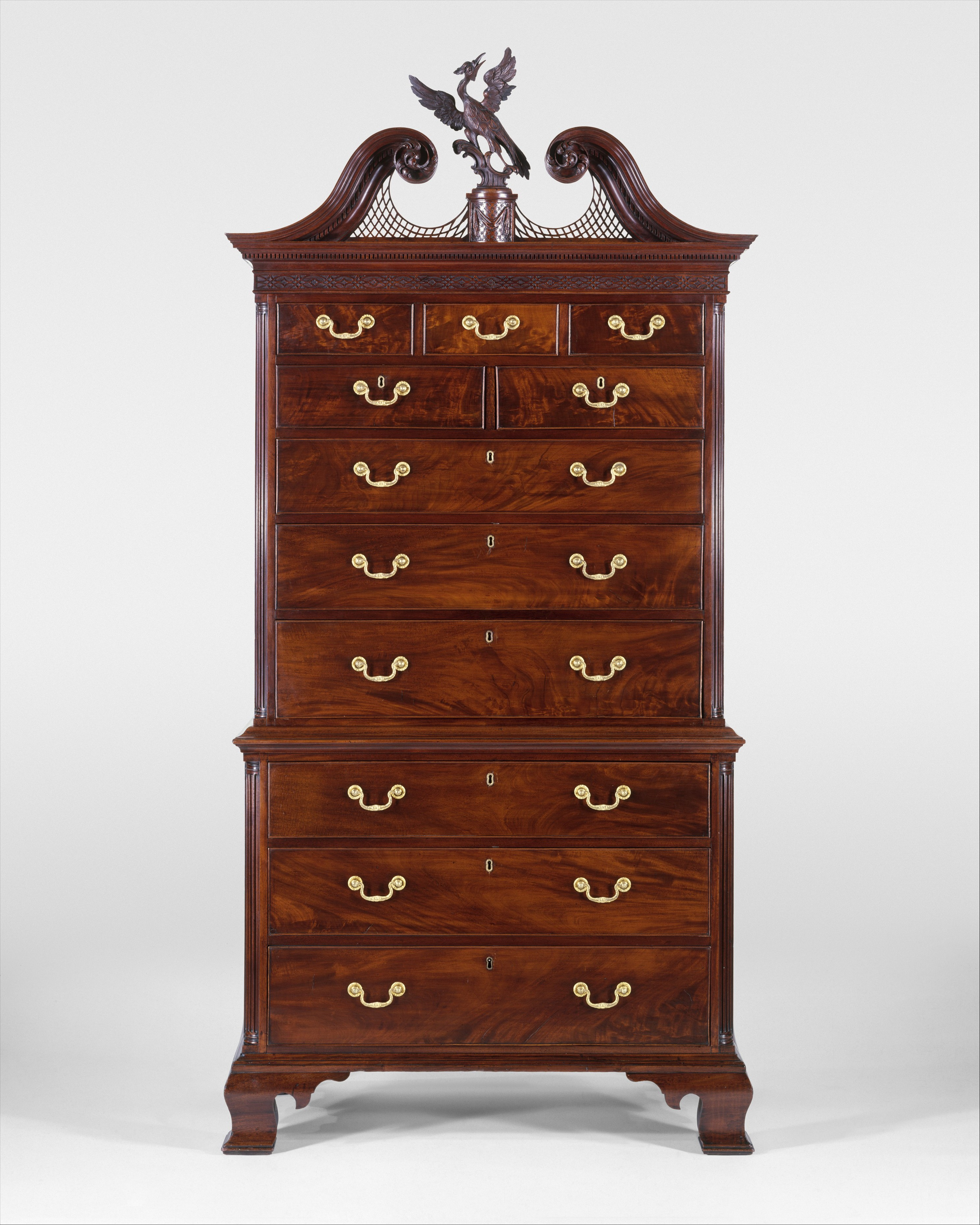
Chest-on-chest (c. 1770-75), Metropolitan Museum of Art.

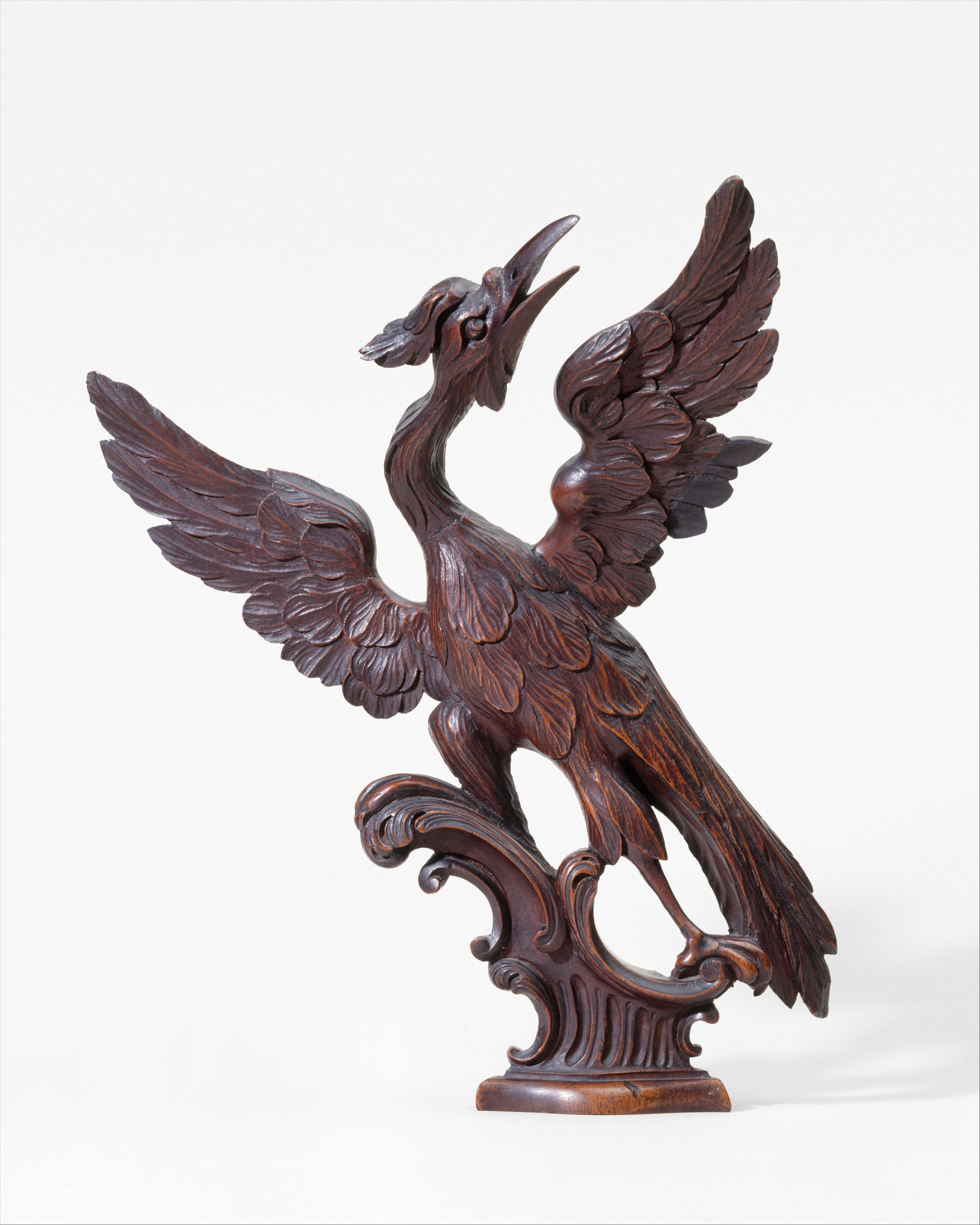
Finial (c. 1770-75), carving attributed to James Reynolds, Metropolitan Museum of Art.
