= Benjamin Randolph (cabinetmaker) =

American cabinetmaker (1737–1791)

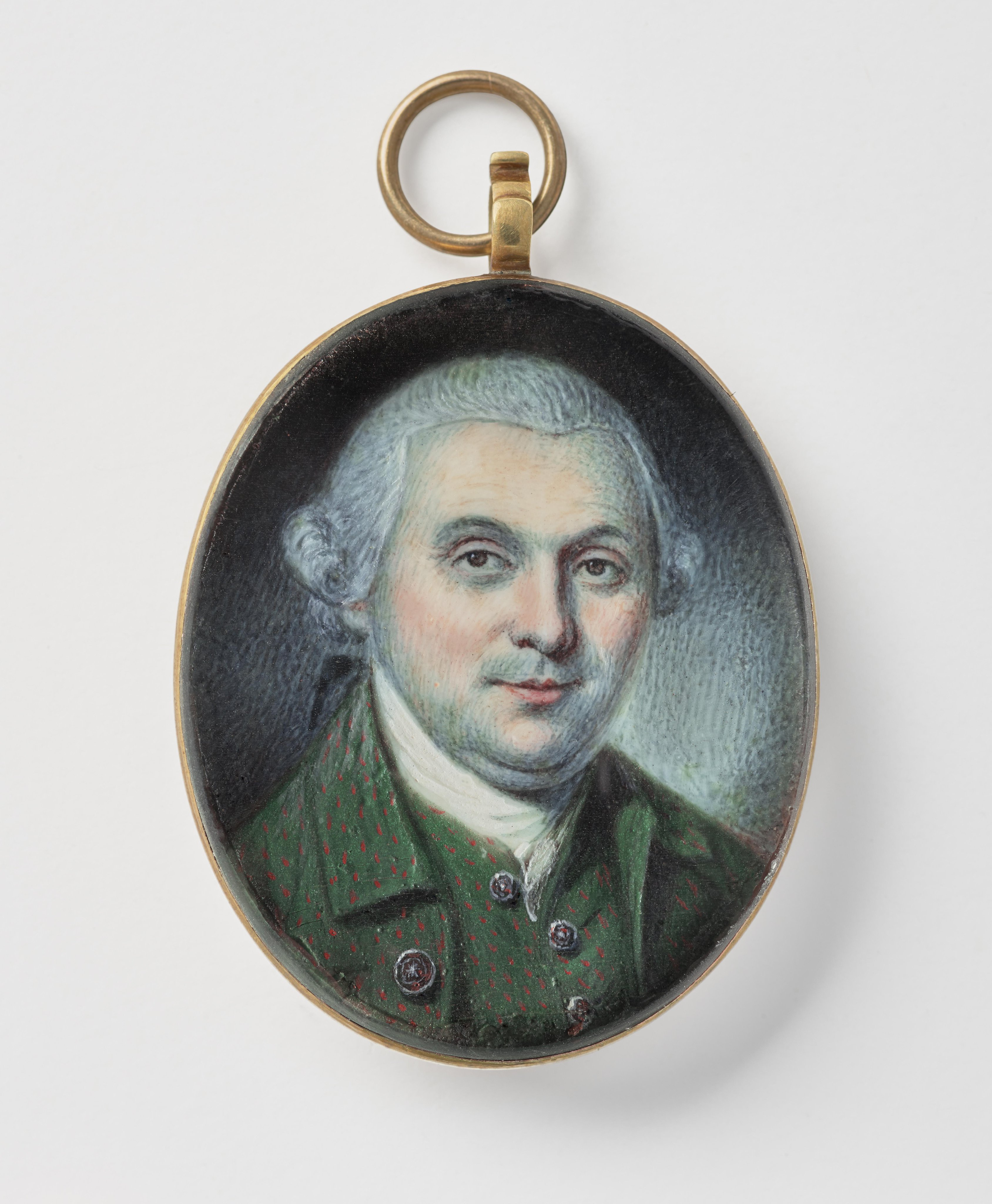
- portrait by Charles Willson Peale
- Born: 30 January 1721; South River
- Died: December 1791; Wading River
- Occupations: Ébéniste, joiner

Benjamin Randolph (1737—1791) was an 18th-century American cabinetmaker who made furniture in the Queen Anne and Philadelphia Chippendale styles. He made the lap desk on which Thomas Jefferson drafted the Declaration of Independence.

== Biography ==
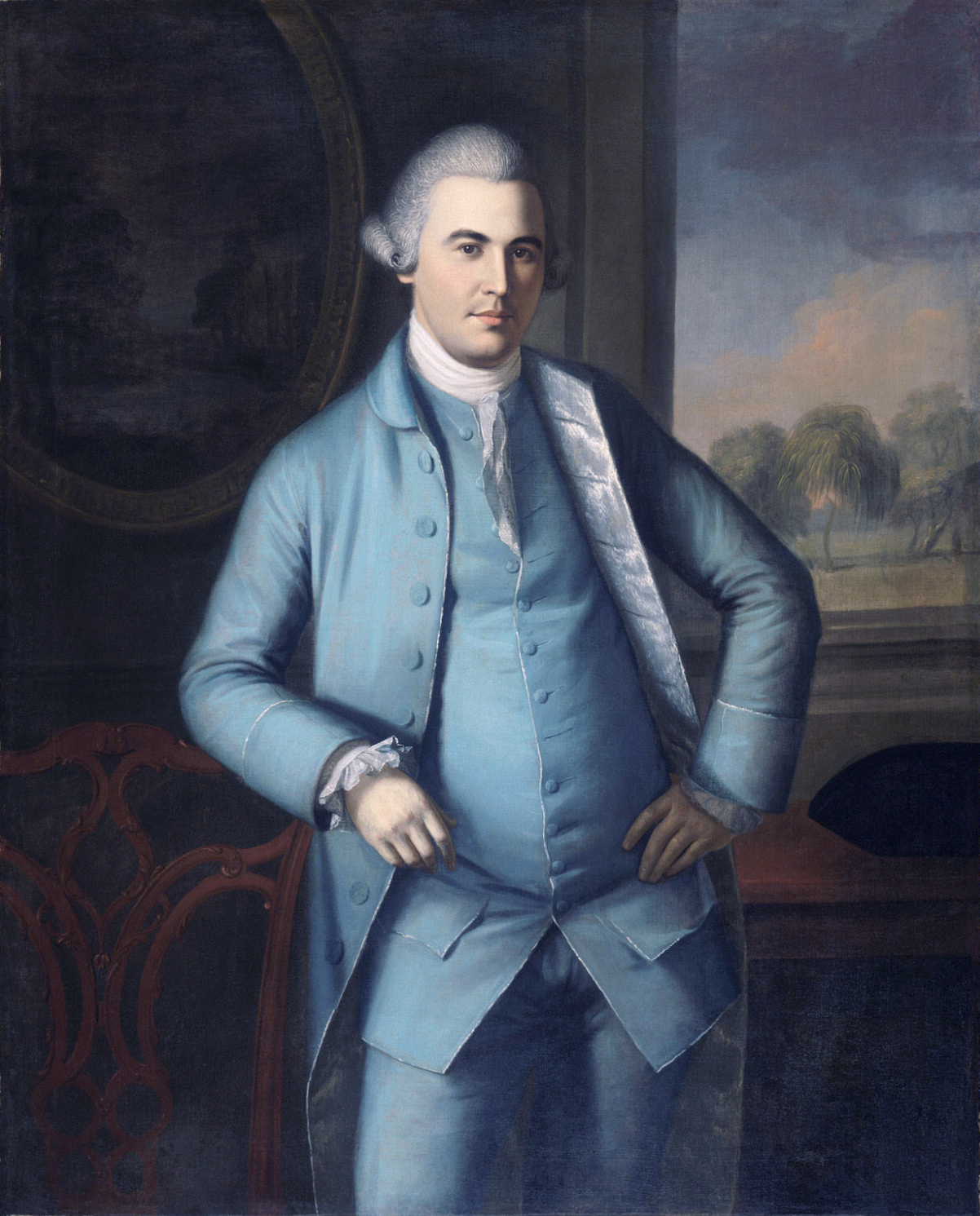
Portrait of Lambert Cadwalader (1771), by Charles Willson Peale. Cadwalader leans on a chair attributed to Randolph. Both the portrait and chair are at the Philadelphia Museum of Art.

He was born in Monmouth County, New Jersey. His family, originally named Fitz-Randolph, were Quakers who fled religious persecution in New England and settled in New Jersey and Pennsylvania. He may have apprenticed under the cabinet-joiner John Jones, from whom he rented lodgings. He married Anna Bromwich on February 18, 1762 at St. Paul's Church, Philadelphia, and they had two daughters, Mary and Anna. An inheritance of his wife's enabled them to buy property, and an investment in a French and Indian War privateer may have provided the capital for him to set up his own cabinetry shop in 1764.

His business of supplying lumber and making windows and architectural carvings expanded in 1767, when he bought a shop on Chestnut Street and advertised himself as a "cabinetmaker." The London-trained carvers Hercules Courtenay and John Pollard were part of this shop; as were joiners or apprentices Benjamin Kendall, Joseph Alston, Peter Lasley, John Hanlin and John Maggs. The account book also lists a number of rented enslaved Africans.

Beginning in 1769, furniture by Randolph bore the label:

All Sorts of CABINET- AND CHAIR-WORK MADE and SOLD by BENJN. RANDOLPH, AT the Sign of the Golden Ball, in Chestnut-Street, PHILADELPHIA.

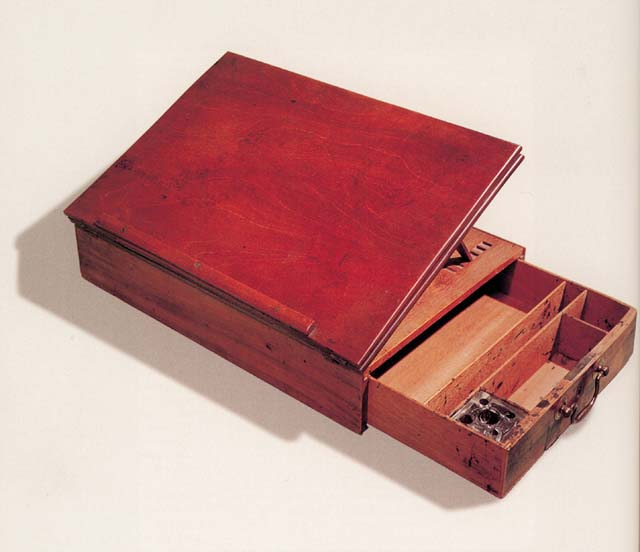
Lap desk on which Thomas Jefferson drafted the Declaration of Independence.

He had a number of prominent clients, including John Dickinson, Captain John Macpherson (owner of the mansion "Mount Pleasant"), Michael Gratz, and Samuel Rowland Fisher. He joined fellow cabinetmaker Thomas Affleck in the major commission to make furniture for John Cadwalader's Philadelphia city house.

Among those who rented lodgings from him were George and Martha Washington, and Peyton Randolph (no relation). Thomas Jefferson rented lodgings in 1775 when a delegate to the Second Continental Congress. He later described the lap desk made for him by Randolph:

"It was made from a drawing of my own, by Ben. Randall [sic] a cabinetmaker in whose house I took my first lodgings on my arrival in Philadelphia in May 1776. And I have used it ever since."

Early in the American Revolutionary War, Randolph provided crates for the Continental Army. He later closed his shop and joined the war effort. He put his shop and tools up for sale in 1778, in preparation for retirement.

He married Mary Wilkinson Fennimore, and retired to his property in Burlington County, New Jersey. He died in December 1791, and was buried in the burial ground at St. Paul's Church, Philadelphia.

== Sample chairs ==
In a 1927 article in The Magazine Antiques, dealer Samuel W. Woodhouse, Jr. identified six spectacularly-carved Philadelphia "sample chairs," each different and thought to be unique. One had descended through Randolph's family with a history of his having made it, and Woodhouse attributed all six to Randolph. Another of the sample chairs matched the chair shown in Charles Willson Peale's Portrait of Lambert Cadwalader (1771). There continues to be debate over whether the sample chairs should be attributed to Randolph or Affleck.

Five additional hairy-paw-foot side chairs from the Cadwalader set were found in Ireland in 1973. These are presumed to have been owned by Dr. Charles E. Cadwalader, John Cadwalader's great-grandson, who permanently moved from Philadelphia to England in 1904. A seventh chair from the set was found in Italy in 1982. The Philadelphia Museum of Art attributes its Cadwalader chair to Randolph. The Metropolitan Museum of Art attributes its Cadwalader chair to Thomas Affleck.

== Examples of his work ==
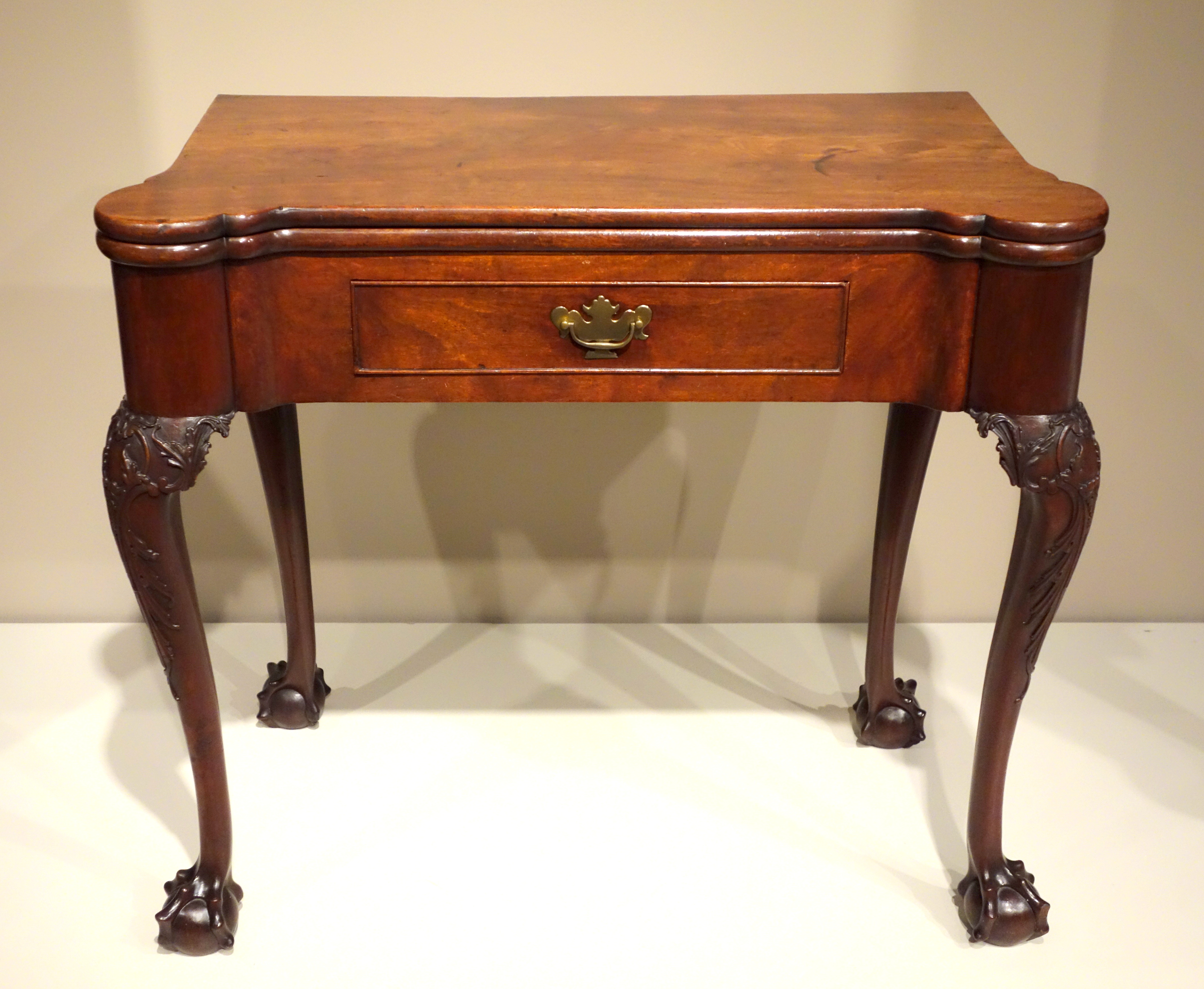
Card table (c.1765-1775), Winterthur Museum.

- Armchair and six side chairs (c. 1755-1770, walnut, attributed to Randolph), Diplomatic Reception Room, U.S. Department of State, Washington, D.C. Made for Vincent Loockerman of Dover, Delaware.
- Set of two armchairs and six side chairs made for William Corbit of Odessa, Delaware (the dates below are each museum's):
  - Pair of side chairs (c. 1760–1775, mahogany, both with Randolph labels), M. and M. Karolik Collection, Museum of Fine Arts, Boston.
  - Side chair (c. 1760–1780, mahogany, with Randolph label), Mabel Garvan Collection, Yale University Art Gallery, New Haven, Connecticut.
  - Armchair and side chair (c. 1760-1780, mahogany), Winterthur Museum, Winterthur, Delaware.
  - Armchair and two side chairs (c. 1765-1775, mahogany, one side chair with Randolph label), private collection.
- Desk-and-bookcase (1765, mahogany). Made for George Vaughn.
- Card table (1765–1775, mahogany, with Randolph label), Winterthur Museum.
- Easy chair (1765–1775, mahogany, attributed to Randolph), Philadelphia Museum of Art. Carving attributed to John Pollard. One of the six "sample chairs" identified by Samuel W. Woodhouse, Jr. in 1927.
- Scalloped-top card table (c. 1770, mahogany, attributed to Randolph), sold at Christie's NY, 25 January 2010.
- Set of (at least 12) hairy-paw-foot side chairs made for John and Elizabeth Cadwalader, Philadelphia, Pennsylvania:
  - Hairy-paw-foot side chair (c. 1770, mahogany, attributed to Randolph), Chipstone Foundation, Milwaukee, Wisconsin. Number I of the set. Found in Italy in 1982. Auctioned at Christie's NY, 14 October 1999, realized $1,432,500.
  - Hairy-paw-foot side chair (c. 1770, mahogany, attributed to Randolph), Winterthur Museum. Number II of the set. One of the six "sample chairs" identified by Samuel W. Woodhouse, Jr. in 1927.
  - Hairy-paw-foot side chair (c. 1770, mahogany, attributed to Thomas Affleck), Metropolitan Museum of Art. Number VII of the set. Found in Ireland in 1973.
  - Hairy-paw-foot side chair (c. 1770, mahogany, attributed to Randolph), Philadelphia Museum of Art. Number VIII of the set. Found in Ireland in 1973.
  - Pair of hairy-paw-foot side chair (c. 1770, mahogany, attributed to Randolph), George M. & Linda H. Kaufman collection, Norfolk, Virginia. Numbers VIIII and X of the set. Found in Ireland in 1973. Promised gift to the National Gallery of Art.
  - Hairy-paw-foot side chair (c. 1770, mahogany, attributed to Randolph), Colonial Williamsburg, Virginia. Number XI of the set. Found in Ireland in 1973.
- Hairy-paw-foot card table (1770, mahogany, attributed to Randolph), Philadelphia Museum of Art. Made for John and Elizabeth Cadwalader.
- Hairy-paw-foot side chair (1770, mahogany, attributed to Randolph), Philadelphia Museum of Art. Made for John and Elizabeth Cadwalader.
- Tea table (1774, mahogany, attributed to Randolph), Philadelphia Museum of Art. Made for Vincent Loockerman of Dover, Delaware.

== Eakins ==
Chippendale chairs attributed to Randolph appear in the painting William Rush Carving His Allegorical Figure of the Schuylkill River (1876–77) by Thomas Eakins, and several other works by the artist. The chairs were lent to Eakins by his friend Dr. Silas Weir Mitchell.

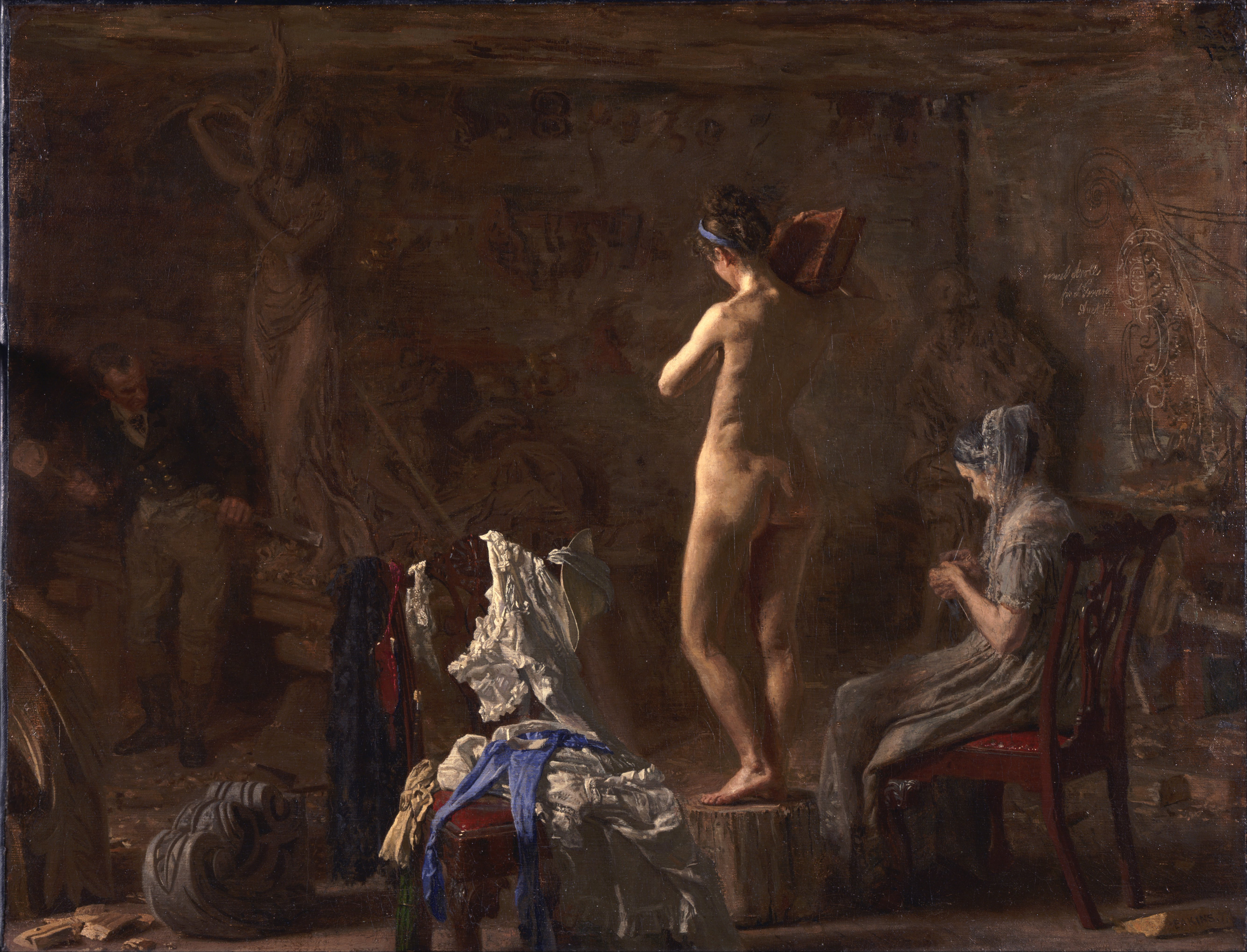
William Rush Carving His Allegorical Figure of the Schuylkill River (1876–77), by Thomas Eakins.

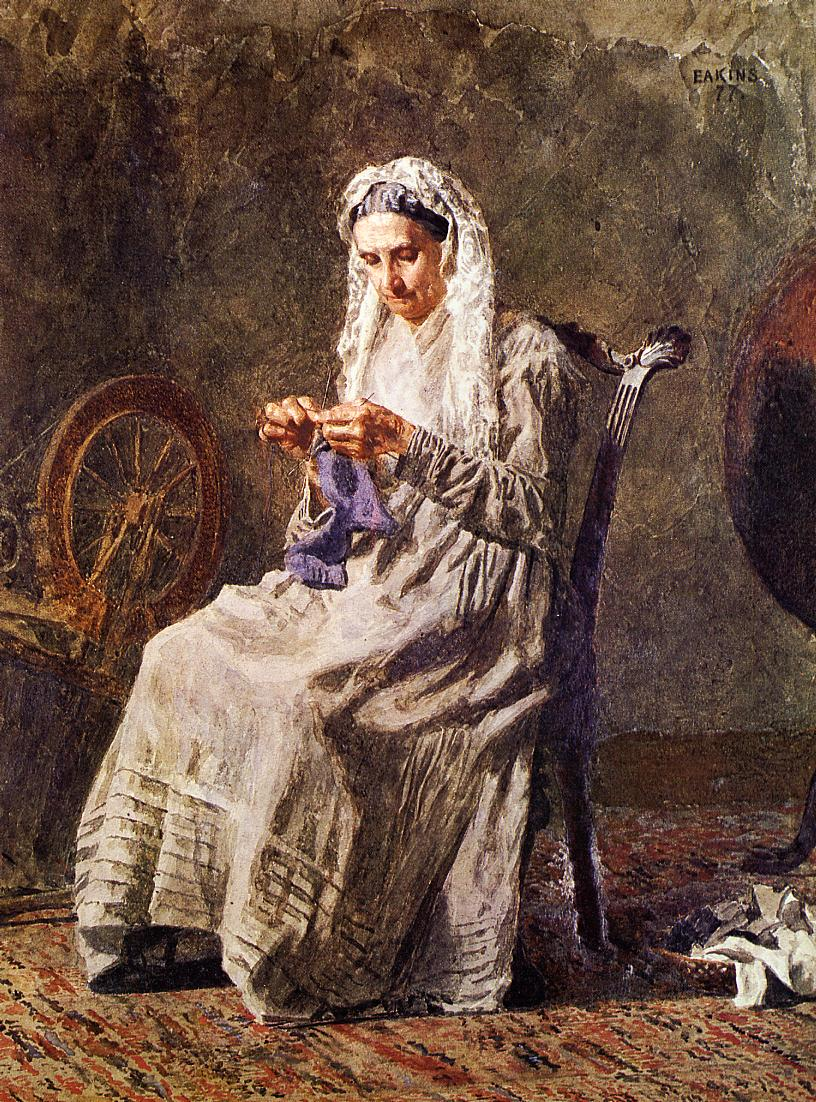
Seventy Years Ago (1877), by Thomas Eakins. Also known as "Aunt Sallie in Dr. M.'s Chair."

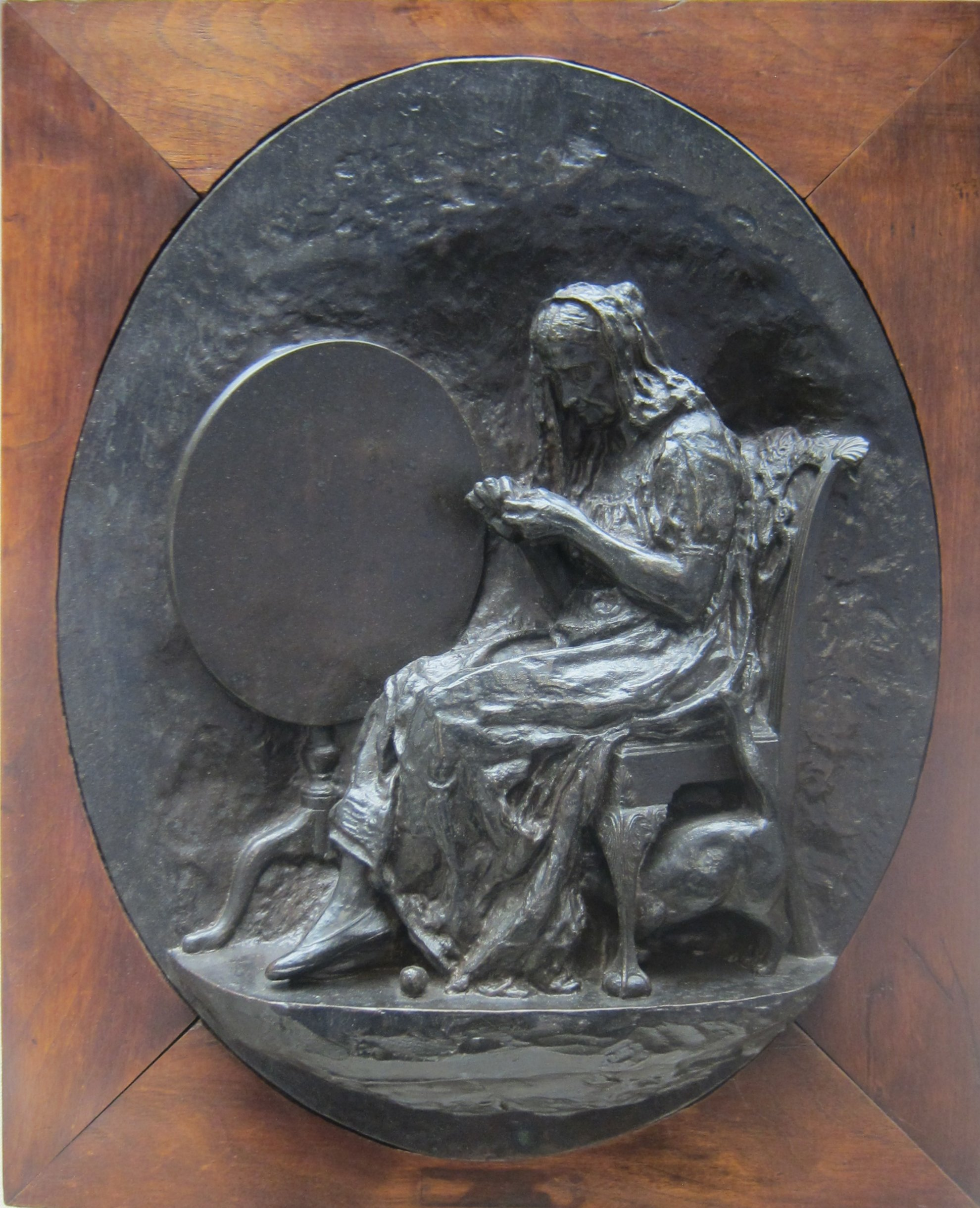
Knitting (1882–83), by Thomas Eakins.

== Notes ==
- "Benjamin Randolph," Philadelphia: Three Centuries of American Art, (Philadelphia Museum of Art, 1976), pp. 110–11.
