= Swan Village =

Area in West Bromwich, West Midlands, England

Coordinates: 52.527°N 2.016°W

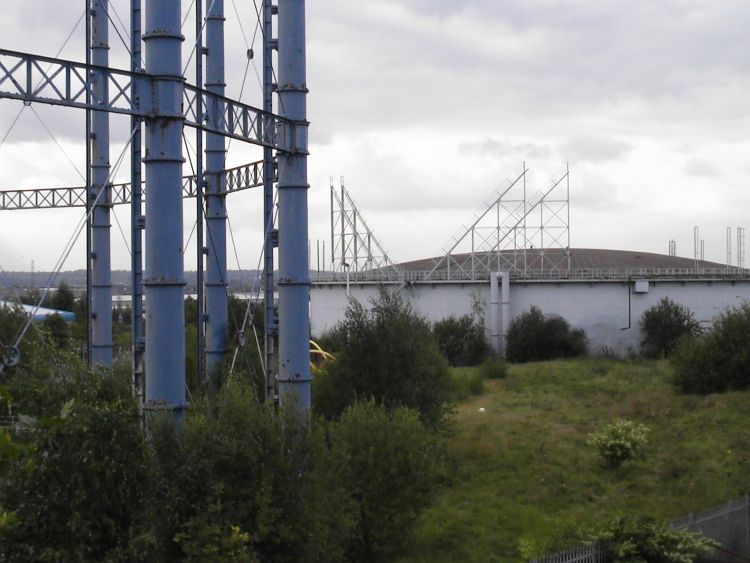
Remains of Swan Village Gas Works.

Swan Village is an area of West Bromwich, in the Metropolitan Borough of Sandwell in the West Midlands County of England.

It is now divided by the Black Country New Road and was the site of the Swan Village Gas Works. Nearby was the junction of the Ridgacre Branch with the Wednesbury Old Canal, both now disused.

Swan Village railway station served the area on the former Birmingham-Wolverhampton line and a branch line to Great Bridge, which closed in 1964 as a result of the Beeching cuts. The line to Birmingham and Wolverhampton closed in 1972 as did the station. A level crossing was situated at one end of the former station, and Black Lake tram stop on the West Midlands Metro route is situated on the other side of this crossing.
