= Works by Francis Bacon =

Overview of works by the English philosopher Francis Bacon

Francis Bacon, 1st Viscount St Alban (22 January 1561 – 9 April 1626) was an English philosopher, statesman, scientist, lawyer, jurist, author, and pioneer of the scientific method. He served both as Attorney General and Lord Chancellor of England. Although his political career ended in disgrace, he remained extremely influential through his works, especially as philosophical advocate and practitioner of the scientific method during the scientific revolution.

Bacon has been called the creator of empiricism. His works established and popularized inductive methodologies for scientific inquiry, often called the Baconian method, or simply the scientific method. His demand for a planned procedure of investigating all things natural marked a new turn in the rhetorical and theoretical framework for science, much of which still surrounds conceptions of proper methodology today.

== Scientific works ==
=== The Great Instauration ===
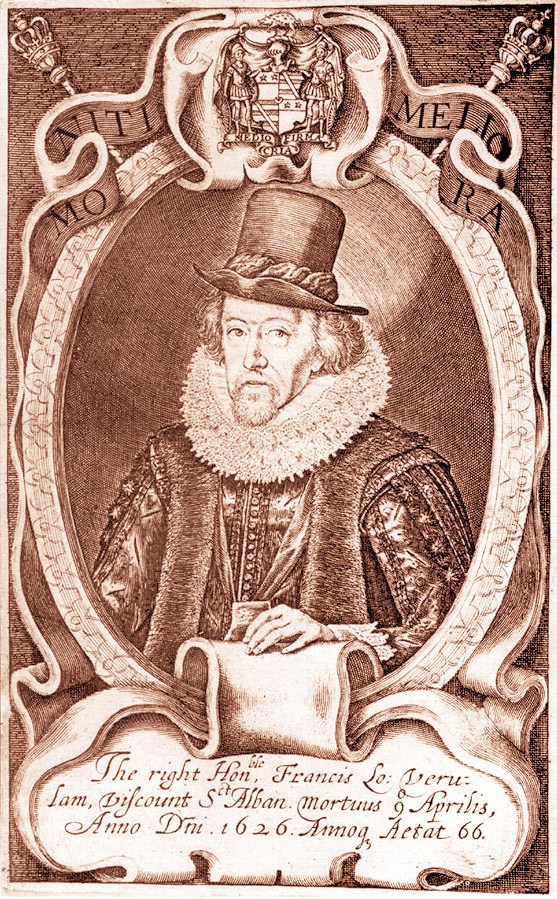
Lord Bacon

Francis Bacon is considered one of the fathers of modern science. He proposed a great reformation of all processes of knowledge for the advancement of thinking, a divine work and human. He called it Instauratio Magna (The Great Instauration or The Great Renewal – the action of restoring or renewing something). Bacon planned his Great Instauration in imitation of the Divine Work – the Work of the Six Days of Creation, as defined in the Bible, leading to the Seventh Day of Rest or Sabbath in which Adam's dominion over creation would be restored, thus dividing the great reformation in six parts:

1. Partitions of the Sciences (De Augmentis Scientiarum)
2. New Method (Novum Organum)
3. Natural History (Historia Naturalis)
4. Ladder of the Intellect (Scala Intellectus)
5. Anticipations of the Second Philosophy (Anticipationes Philosophiæ Secunda)
6. The Second Philosophy or Active Science (Philosophia Secunda aut Scientia Activæ)

For Bacon, this reformation would lead to a great advancement in science and a progeny of new inventions that would relieve mankind's miseries and needs.

In Novum Organum, the second part of the Instauration, he stated his view that the restoration of science was part of the "partial returning of mankind to the state it lived before the fall", restoring its dominion over creation, while religion and faith would partially restore mankind's original state of innocence and purity.

In the book The Great Instauration, he also gave some admonitions regarding the ends and purposes of science, from which much of his philosophy can be deduced. He said that men should confine the sense within the limits of duty in respect to things divine, while not falling in the opposite error which would be to think that inquisition of nature is forbidden by divine law. Another admonition was concerning the ends of science: that mankind should seek knowledge not for pleasure, contention, superiority over others, profit, fame, or power, but for the benefit and use of life, and that they perfect and govern it in charity.

Regarding faith, in De Augmentis, he wrote that "the more discordant, therefore, and incredible, the divine mystery is, the more honor is shown to God in believing it, and the nobler is the victory of faith." He wrote in The Essays: Of Atheism, "a little philosophy inclineth man's mind to atheism; but depth in philosophy bringeth men's minds about to religion." Meanwhile, in the very next essay called "Of Superstition" Bacon remarks, "Atheism leaves a man to sense, to philosophy, to natural piety, to laws, to reputation; all which may be guides to an outward moral virtue, though religion was not; but superstition dismounts all these, and erecteth an absolute monarchy in the minds of men. Therefore atheism did never perturb states; for it makes men wary of themselves, as looking no further: and we see the times inclined to atheism (as the time of Augustus Cæsar) were civil times. But superstition hath been the confusion of many states, and bringeth in a new primum mobile, that ravished all the spheres of government". Percy Bysshe Shelley cites this passage in his essay "The Necessity of Atheism". Yet even more than this, Bacon's views of God are in accordance with popular Christian theology, as he writes, "They that deny a God destroy man's nobility; for certainly man is of kin to the beasts by his body; and, if he be not of kin to God by his spirit, he is a base and ignoble creature."

He considered science (natural philosophy) as a remedy against superstition, and therefore a "most faithful attendant" of religion, considering religion as the revelation of God's will and science as the contemplation of God's power.

Nevertheless, Bacon contrasted the new approach of the development of science with that of the Middle Ages:

Men have sought to make a world from their own conception and to draw from their own minds all the material which they employed, but if instead of doing so, they had consulted experience and observation, they would have the facts and not opinions to reason about, and might have ultimately arrived at the knowledge of the laws which govern the material world.

He spoke of the advancement of science in the modern world as the fulfilment of a prophecy made in the Book of Daniel saying: "But thou, O Daniel, shut up the words, and seal the book, even to the time of the end: many shall run to and fro, and knowledge shall be increased" (see "Of the Interpretation of Nature").

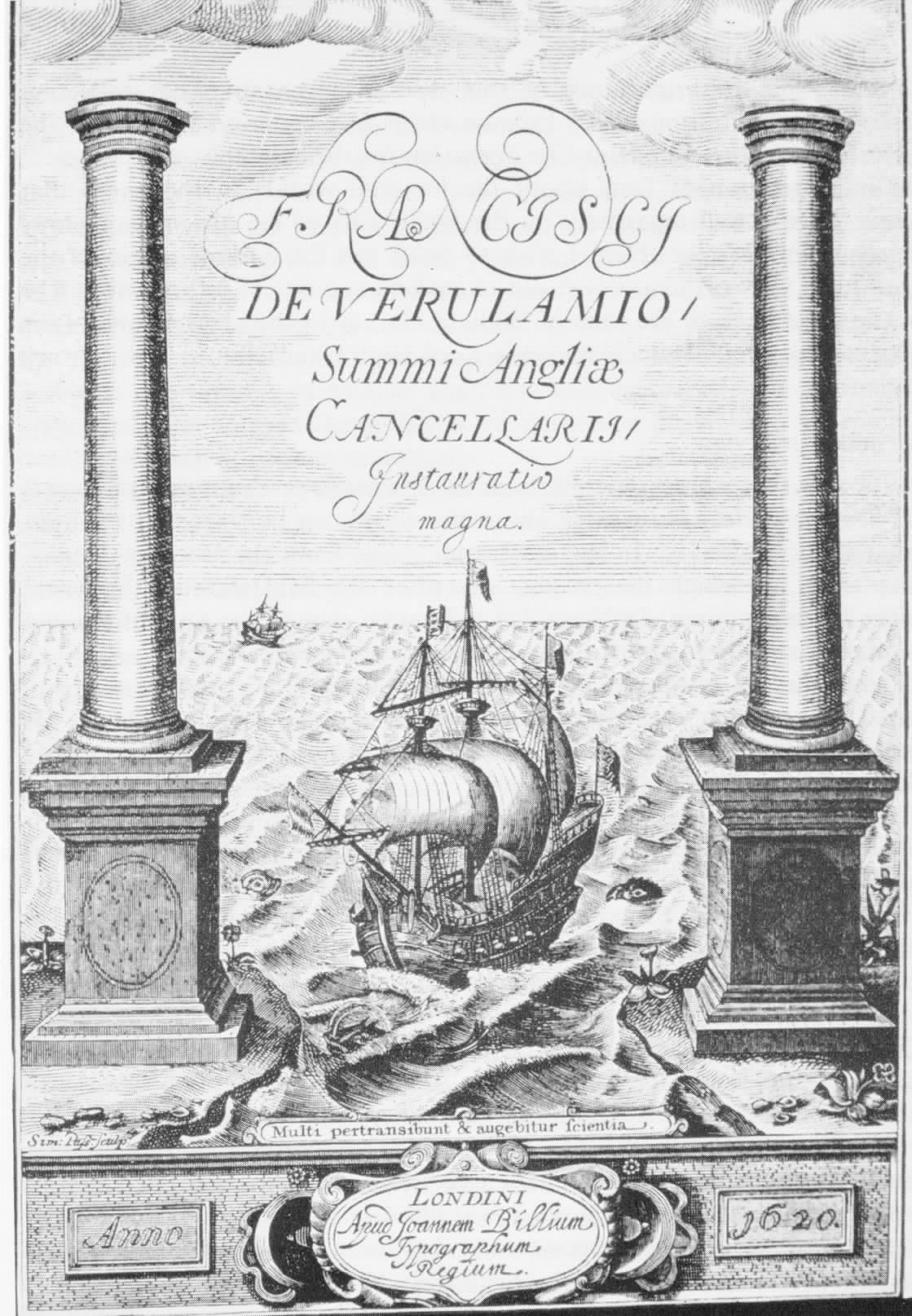
Frontispiece to Instauratio Magna (1620). The Latin inscription is from Daniel 12:4: "Multi pertransibunt et augebitur scientia." ('Many shall go to and fro and knowledge shall be increased.')

Bacon also quotes from the Book of Daniel (12:4) in the inscription on the frontispiece of the 1620 publication: "Many shall go to and fro and knowledge shall be increased." Through this inscription, Bacon draws a parallel between the Age of Exploration and the Scientific Revolution. The frontispiece also depicts European ships sailing past the Pillars of Hercules, which represented the geographical boundary of the classical world. In Aphorism 92, Book I of Novum Organum, Bacon writes: "…just as Columbus did, before his wonderful voyage across the Atlantic Ocean, when he gave the reasons for his confidence that he could find new lands and continents beyond those known already; reasons which, although rejected at first, were later proved by experiment, and became the causes and starting points of great things."

Since Bacon's ideal was a widespread revolution of the common method of scientific inquiry, there had to be some way by which his method could become widespread. His solution was to lobby the state to make natural philosophy a matter of greater importance – not only to fund it, but also to regulate it. While in office under Queen Elizabeth, he even advocated for the employment of a minister for science and technology, a position that was never realized. Later under King James, Bacon wrote in The Advancement of Learning: "The King should take order for the collecting and perfecting of a Natural and Experimental History, true and severe (unencumbered with literature and book-learning), such as philosophy may be built upon, so that philosophy and the sciences may no longer float in air, but rest on the solid foundation of experience of every kind."

While Bacon was a strong advocate for state involvement in scientific inquiry, he also felt that his general method should be applied directly to the functioning of the state as well. For Bacon, matters of policy were inseparable from philosophy and science. Bacon recognized the repetitive nature of history and sought to correct it by making the future direction of government more rational. To make future civil history more linear and achieve real progress, he felt that methods of the past and experiences of the present should be examined together to determine the best ways by which to go about civil discourse. Bacon began one particular address to the House of Commons with a reference to the book of Jeremiah: "Stand in the ancient ways but look also into a present experience to see whether in the light of this experience ancient ways are right. If they are found to be so, walk in them". In short, he wanted his method of progress building on progress in natural philosophy to be integrated into England's political theory.

According to author Nieves Mathews, the promoters of the French Reformation misrepresented Bacon by deliberately mistranslating and editing his writings to suit their anti-religious and materialistic concepts, which action would have carried a highly influential negative effect on his reputation.

=== Novum Organum ('New Method') ===
The Novum Organum is a philosophical work by Francis Bacon published in 1620. The title is a reference to Aristotle's work Organon, which was his treatise on logic and syllogism, and is the second part of his Instauration.

The book is divided into two parts, the first part being called "On the Interpretation of Nature and the Empire of Man", and the second "On the Interpretation of Nature, or the Reign of Man".

Bacon starts the work saying that man is " the minister and interpreter of nature", that "knowledge and human power are synonymous", that "effects are produced by the means of instruments and helps", and that "man while operating can only apply or withdraw natural bodies; nature internally performs the rest", and later that "nature can only be commanded by obeying her". Here is an abstract of the philosophy of this work, that by the knowledge of nature and the using of instruments, man can govern or direct the natural work of nature to produce definite results. Therefore, that man, by seeking knowledge of nature, can reach power over it – and thus reestablish the "Empire of Man over creation", which had been lost by the Fall together with man's original purity. In this way, he believed, would mankind be raised above conditions of helplessness, poverty, and mystery, while coming into a condition of peace, prosperity, and security.

Bacon, taking into consideration the possibility of mankind misusing its power over nature gained by science, expressed his opinion that there was no need to fear it – for once mankind restored this power "assigned to them by the gift of God", it would be correctly governed by "right reason and true religion". The moral aspects of the use of this power, and the way mankind should exercise it, however, are more explored in other works rather than the Novum Organum, such as in Valerius Terminus.

For this purpose of obtaining knowledge of and power over nature, Bacon outlined in this work a new system of logic he believed to be superior to the old ways of syllogism, developing his scientific method, consisting of procedures for isolating the formal cause of a phenomenon (heat, for example) through eliminative induction. For him, the philosopher should proceed through inductive reasoning from fact to axiom to physical law. Before beginning this induction, though, the enquirer must free his or her mind from certain false notions or tendencies that distort the truth. These are called "Idols" (idola), (Note: "Idols" is the usual translation of idola, but "illusion" is perhaps a more accurate translation to modern English.) and are of four kinds:

- "Idols of the Tribe" (idola tribus), which are common to the race;
- "Idols of the Den" (idola specus), which are peculiar to the individual;
- "Idols of the Marketplace" (idola fori), coming from the misuse of language; and
- "Idols of the Theatre" (idola theatri), which stem from philosophical dogmas.

About which, he stated:

If we have any humility towards the Creator; if we have any reverence or esteem of his works; if we have any charity towards men or any desire of relieving their miseries and necessities; if we have any love for natural truths; any aversion to darkness, any desire of purifying the understanding, we must destroy these idols, which have led experience captive, and childishly triumphed over the works of God; and now at length condescend, with due submission and veneration, to approach and peruse the volume of the creation; dwell some time upon it, and bringing to the work a mind well purged of opinions, idols, and false notions, converse familiarly therein.

Of the idols of the mind that Bacon categorizes, he identified those of the marketplace to be the most troublesome in humanity's achieving an accurate understanding of Nature. Bacon finds philosophy to have become preoccupied with words, particularly discourse and debate, rather than actually observing the material world: "For while men believe their reason governs words, in fact, words turn back and reflect their power upon the understanding, and so render philosophy and science sophistical and inactive." Bacon's concern of the idols of the marketplace is words no longer correspond to Nature but instead come to refer to intangible concepts and so possess an artificial worth.

Bacon considered that it is of greatest importance to science not to keep doing intellectual discussions or seeking merely contemplative aims, but that it should work for the bettering of mankind's life by bringing forth new inventions, has even stated that "inventions are also, as it were, new creations and imitations of divine works". He cites examples from the ancient world, saying that in Ancient Egypt the inventors were reputed among the gods, and in a higher position than the heroes of the political sphere, such as legislators, liberators and the like. He explores the far-reaching and world-changing character of inventions, such as in the stretch:

Printing, gunpowder and the compass: These three have changed the whole face and state of things throughout the world; the first in literature, the second in warfare, the third in navigation; whence have followed innumerable changes, in so much that no empire, no sect, no star seems to have exerted greater power and influence in human affairs than these mechanical discoveries.

He also took into consideration what were the mistakes in the existing natural philosophies of the time and that required correction, pointing out three sources of error and three species of false philosophy: the sophistical, the empirical and the superstitious.

The sophistical school, according to Bacon, corrupted natural philosophy by their logic. This school was criticized by Bacon for "determining the question according to their will, and just then resorts to experience, bending her into conformity". Concerning the empirical school, Bacon said that it gives birth to dogmas more deformed and monstrous than the sophistical or rational school and that it based itself in the narrowness and darkness of a few experiments.

For the superstitious school, he believed it to provoke great harm, for it consisted of a dangerous mixture of superstition with theology. He mentions as examples some systems of philosophy from Ancient Greece, and some then-contemporary examples in which scholars would in levity take the Bible as a system of natural philosophy. He considered this to be an improper relationship between science and religion, stating that from "this unwholesome mixture of things human and divine there arises not only a fantastic philosophy but also a heretical religion", about which Professor Benjamin Farrington stated: "while it is a fact that he labored to distinguish the realms of faith and knowledge, it is equally true that he thought one without the other useless".

A common mistake, however, is to consider Bacon an empiricist. According to Thomas Case: "Although he exhorted men to reject as idols all pre-conceived notions and lay themselves alongside of nature by observation and experiment, so as gradually to ascend from facts to their laws, nevertheless he was far from regarding sensory experience as the whole origin of knowledge, and in truth had a double theory, that, while sense and experience are the sources of our knowledge of the natural world, faith and inspiration are the sources of our knowledge of the supernatural, of God, and of the rational soul." Bacon gave an admonition in The Great Instauration: "that men confine the sense within the limits of duty in respect to things divine: for the sense is like the sun, which reveals the face of earth, but seals and shuts up the face of heaven".

=== Advancement of Learning ===
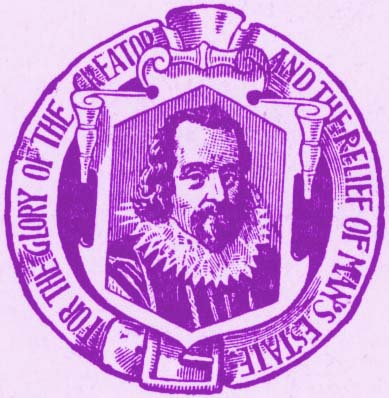
"For the Glory of the Creator and the relief of man's estate" – Advancement of Learning

Of Proficience and Advancement of Learning Divine and Human was published in 1605, and is written in the form of a letter to King James.

This book would be considered the first step in the Great Instauration scale, of "partitions of the sciences".

In this work, which is divided into two books, Bacon starts giving philosophical, civic and religious arguments for the engaging in the aim of advancing learning. In the second book, Bacon analyses the state of the sciences of his day, stating what was being done incorrectly, what should be bettered, in which way should they be advanced.

Among his arguments in the first book, he considered learned kingdoms and rulers to be higher than the unlearned, evoked as example King Solomon, the biblical king who had established a school of natural research, and gave discourses on how knowledge should be used for the "glory of the Creator" and "the relief of man's estate", if only it was governed by charity.

In the second book, he divided human understanding into three parts: history, related to man's faculty of memory; poetry, related to man's faculty of imagination; and philosophy, pertaining to man's faculty of reason. Then he considers the three aspects with which each branch of understanding can relate itself to a divine, human and natural. From the combination of the three branches (history, poetry, and philosophy) and three aspects (divine, human and natural) a series of different sciences are deduced.

- He divided history into divine history, or the history of religion; human or political history; and natural history.
- Poetry he divided into narrative (natural/historical) poetry; dramatic (human) poetry, the kind of which "the ancients used to educate the minds of men to virtue"; and divine (parabolic) poetry, in which "the secrets and mysteries of religion, policy, and philosophy are involved in fables or parables".
- Philosophy he divided into divine, natural and human, which he referred to as the triple character of the power of God, the difference of nature, and the use of man.

Furthermore, he divided divine philosophy into natural theology (or the lessons of God in Nature) and revealed theology (or the lessons of God in the sacred scriptures), and natural philosophy in physics, metaphysics, mathematics (which included music, astronomy, geography, architecture, engineering), and medicine. For human philosophy, he meant the study of mankind itself, the kind of which leads to self-knowledge, through the study of the mind and the soul – which suggests resemblance with modern psychology.

He also took into consideration rhetoric, communication, and transmission of knowledge.

This work was later expanded, translated into Latin, and published as De Augmentis Scientiarum. In this later Latin translation, he also presented his cipher method.

=== Valerius Terminus: of the Interpretation of Nature ===
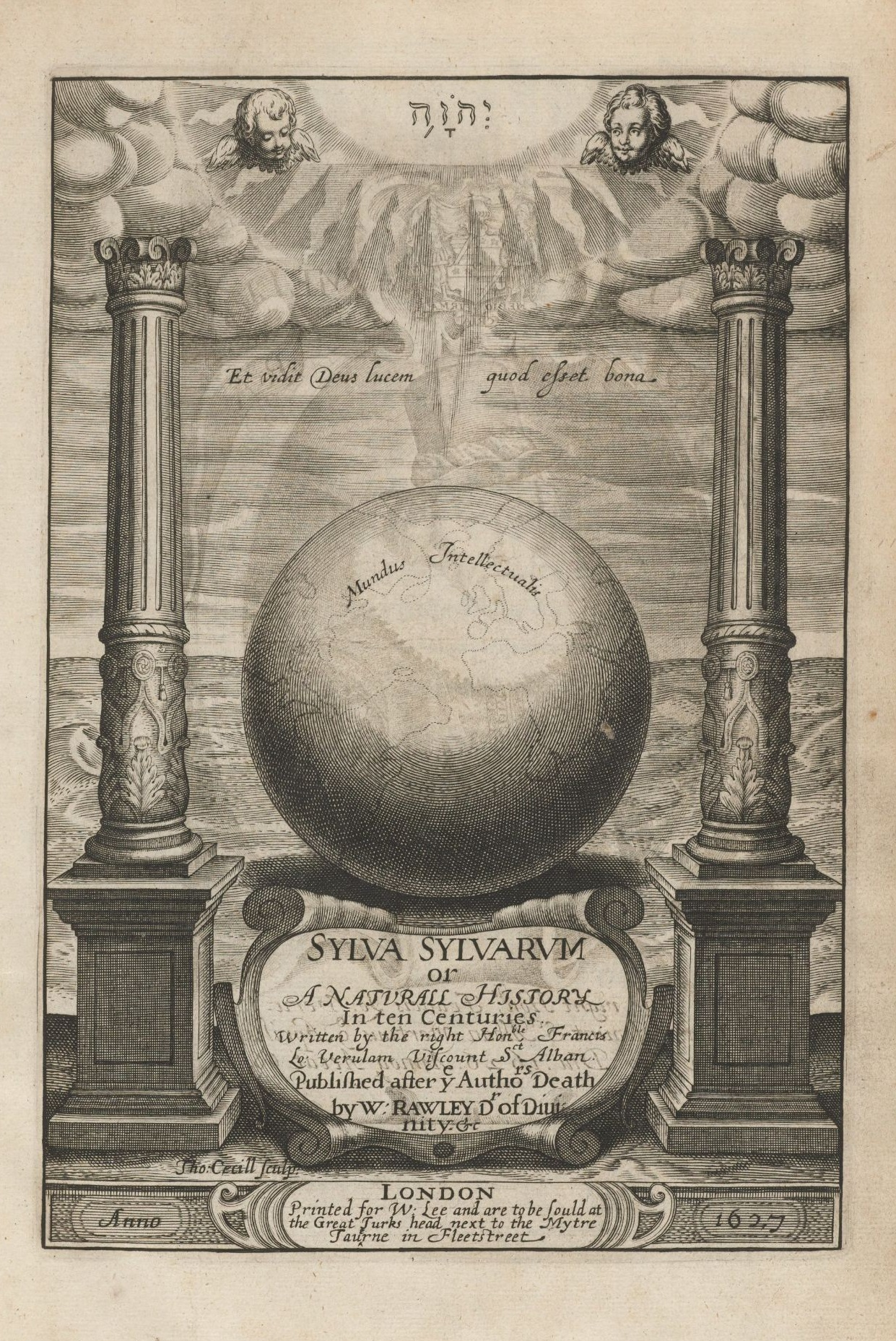
Frontispiece of Sylva Sylvarum, Bacon's work on Natural History. In the top, a Sun with the name of God written in Hebraic characters within, surrounded by angels, sending light rays to the Earth

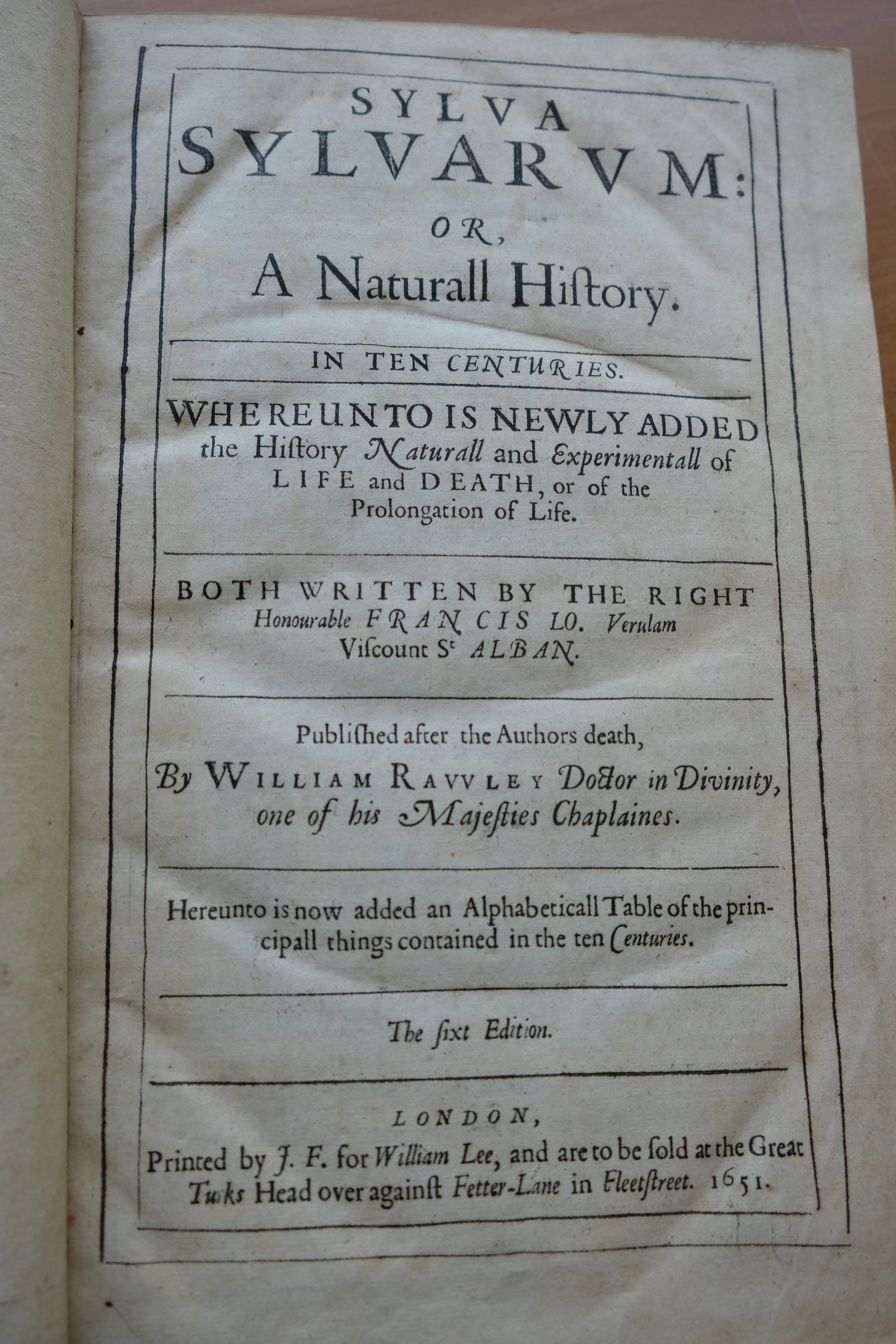
Front page of a 1651 copy of Sylva sylvarum

In this work of 1603, an argument for the progress of knowledge, Bacon considers the moral, religious and philosophical implications and requirements for the advancement of learning and the development of science. Although not as well known as other works such as Novum Organum and Advancement of Learning, this work's importance in Bacon's thought resides in the fact that it was the first of his scientific writings.

He opens the book, in the proem, stating his belief that the man who succeeds in "kindling a light in nature", would be "the benefactor indeed of the human race, the propagator of man's empire over the universe, the champion of liberty, the conqueror and subduer of necessities", and at the same time identifying himself as that man, saying he believed he "had been born for the service of mankind", and that in considering in what way mankind might best be served, he had found none so great as the discovery of new arts, endowments, and commodities for the bettering of man's life.

In the first chapter, "Of the Limits and End of Knowledge", he outlines what he believed to be the limits and true ends of pursuing knowledge through sciences, in a similar way as he would later do in his book The Great Instauration. He disavows both the knowledge and the power that is not dedicated to goodness or love, and as such, that all the power achieved by man through science must be subject to "that use for which God hath granted it; which is the benefit and relief of the state and society of man; for otherwise, all manner of knowledge becometh malign and serpentine; ...as the Scripture saith excellently, knowledge bloweth up, but charity buildeth up".

(See "Of the Limits and End of Knowledge" in Wikisource.)

Further on, he also takes into consideration what were the present conditions in society and government that were preventing the advancement of knowledge.

In this book, Bacon considers the increase of knowledge in sciences not only as "a plant of God's own planting", but also as the fulfilling of a prophecy made by Daniel in the Old Testament:

...all knowledge appeareth to be a plant of God's own planting, so it may seem the spreading and flourishing or at least the bearing and fructifying of this plant, by a providence of God, nay not only by a general providence but by a special prophecy, was appointed to this autumn of the world: for to my understanding it is not violent to the letter, and safe now after the event, so to interpret that place in the prophecy of Daniel where speaking of the latter times it is said, 'many shall pass to and fro, and science shall be increased' [Daniel 12:4]; as if the opening of the world by navigation and commerce and the further discovery of knowledge should meet in one time or age.

This quote from the Book of Daniel appears also in the title page of Bacon's Instauratio Magna and Novum Organum, in Latin: "Multi pertransibunt & augebitur scientia".

=== The History of Life and Death ===
The History of Life and Death (1638) is a treatise on medicine, with observations natural and experimental for the prolonging of life.

He opens, in the preface, stating his hope and desire that the work would contribute to the common good, and that through it the physicians would become "instruments and dispensers of God's power and mercy in prolonging and renewing the life of man".

He also gives, in the preface, a Christian argument for mankind to desire the prolonging of life, saying that "though the life of man be nothing else but a mass and accumulation of sins and sorrows, and they that look for an eternal life set but light by a temporary: yet the continuation of works of charity ought not to be contemned, even by Christians". Bacon then recalls examples of apostles, saints, monks and hermits who were accounted to have lived for a long term, and how this was considered to be a blessing in the old law (Old Testament).

Throughout the work, Bacon inquires for the causes of the degeneration of the body and old age, taking into consideration different analysis, theories and experiments, to find possible remedies to them that could prolong life and retard the process of degeneration of the body. Alimentation, conditions of mind/feeling, correct relationship between body and spirit are included as vital for one's health.

In a later and smaller part of the treatise, Bacon takes into consideration the emotional and mental states that are prejudicial or profitable in the prolonging of life, taking some of them into particular consideration, such as grief, fear, hate, unquietness, morose, envy – which he placed among those that are prejudicial, and others such as love, compassion, joy, hope, and admiration and light contemplation – that he reputed among the profitable.

This work was one of the most well regarded in his lifetime, which can be testified by the many eulogies made to it in Manes Verulamani.

== Religious and literary works ==
=== The New Atlantis ===
In 1623, Bacon expressed his aspirations and ideals in New Atlantis. Released in 1627, this was his creation of an ideal land where "generosity and enlightenment, dignity and splendor, piety and public spirit" were the commonly held qualities of the inhabitants of Bensalem. The name Bensalem means 'Son of Peace', (Note: Ben: "son"; Salem: "peace", "peaceful" or "at peace".) having obvious resemblance with Bethlehem (birthplace of Jesus), and is referred to as "God's bosom, a land unknown", in the last page of the work.

In this utopian work, written in literary form, a group of Europeans travels west from Peru by boat. After having suffered with strong winds at sea and fearing for death, they "did lift up their hearts and voices to God above, beseeching him of his mercy". After that incident, these travellers in a distant water finally reached the island of Bensalem, where they found a fair and well-governed city, and were received kindly and with all humanity by Christian and cultured people, who had been converted centuries before by a miracle wrought by Saint Bartholomew, twenty years after the Ascension of Jesus, by which the scriptures had reached them in a mysterious ark of cedar floating on the sea, guarded by a gigantic pillar of light, in the form of a column, over which was a bright cross of light.

Many aspects of the society and history of the island are described, such as the Christian religion; a cultural feast in honour of the family institution, called "the Feast of the Family"; a college of sages, the Salomon's House, "the very eye of the kingdom", to which order "God of heaven and earth had vouchsafed the grace to know the works of Creation, and the secrets of them", as well as "to discern between divine miracles, works of nature, works of art, and impostures and illusions of all sorts"; and a series of instruments, process and methods of scientific research that were employed in the island by the Salomon's House. The work also goes on interpreting the ancient fable of Atlantis, considering the lost island as actually being the American continent, which would have had much greater civilizations in the distant past than the ones at present suggest, but whose greatness and achievements were destroyed and covered by a terrible flood, the present American Indians being just descendants of the more primitive people of the ancient civilization of Atlantis who had survived the flood because they lived apart from the civilization, in the mountains and high altitudes.

The inhabitants of Bensalem are described as having a high moral character and honesty, no official accepting any payment for their services from the visitors, and the people being described as chaste and pious, as said by an inhabitant of the island:

But hear me now, and I will tell you what I know. You shall understand that there is not under the heavens so chaste a nation as this of Bensalem; nor so free from all pollution or foulness. It is the virgin of the world. I remember I have read in one of your European books, of a holy hermit amongst you that desired to see the Spirit of Fornication; and there appeared to him a little foul ugly Aethiop. But if he had desired to see the Spirit of Chastity of Bensalem, it would have appeared to him in the likeness of a fair beautiful Cherubim. For there is nothing amongst mortal men more fair and admirable than the chaste minds of this people. Know, therefore, that with them there are no stews, no dissolute houses, no courtesans, nor anything of that kind. [...] And their usual saying is, that whosoever is unchaste cannot reverence himself; and they say, that the reverence of a man's self, is, next to religion, the chiefest bridle of all vices.

In the last third of the book, the Head of Salomon's House takes one of the European visitors to show him all the scientific background of Salomon's House, where experiments are conducted in Baconian method to understand and conquer nature and to apply the collected knowledge to the betterment of society. Namely: 1) the end of their foundation; 2) the preparations they have for their works; 3) the several employments and function whereto their fellows are assigned; 4) and the ordinances and rites which they observe.

Here he portrays a vision of the future of human discovery and knowledge and a practical demonstration of his method. In the society of Bensalem, Bacon anticipates the modern-day research university in Salomon's House, in both applied and pure science.

The end of their foundation is thus described: "The end of our foundation is the knowledge of causes, and secret motions of things; and the enlarging of the bounds of human empire, to the effecting of all things possible".

In describing the ordinances and rites observed by the scientists of Salomon's House, its head said: "We have certain hymns and services, which we say daily, of Lord and thanks to God for His marvelous works; and some forms of prayer, imploring His aid and blessing for the illumination of our labors, and the turning of them into good and holy uses". (See Bacon's "Student's Prayer" and Bacon's "Writer's Prayer")

There has been much speculation as to whether a real island society inspired Bacon's utopia. Scholars have suggested numerous countries, from Iceland to Japan; Dr. Nick Lambert highlighted the latter in The View Beyond.

A city named Bensalem was founded in Pennsylvania, in 1682.

Despite being posthumously published in 1626, New Atlantis has an important place in Bacon's corpus. While his scientific treatises, such as The Advancement and Novum, are prescriptive in tone, advising how European thought must change through the adoption of the new scientific mindset, New Atlantis offers a look at what Bacon envisions as the ultimate fruition of his instauration. This text pictures Bacon's dream of a society organized around his epistemological and social agenda. In many ways Bacon's utopian text is a cumulative work: the predominant themes Bacon consistently returns to throughout his intellectual life—the dominance over Nature through experimentalism, the notion of a charitable form of knowledge, and the complementary relationship between religion and science—are very much foregrounded in New Atlantis, becoming the pillars of Bensalemite culture.

=== Essays ===
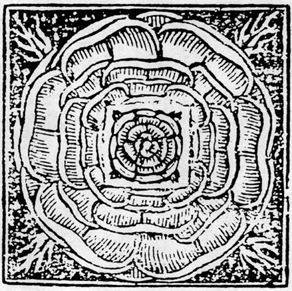
A Collection of Apothegmes New and Old frontispiece, 1661

Bacon's Essays were first published in 1597 as Essayes. Religious Meditations. Places of Perswasion and Disswasion. Seene and Allowed. There were only ten essays in this version, relatively aphoristic and brief in style. A much-enlarged second edition appeared in 1612, with 38 essays. Another, under the title Essayes or Counsels, Civill and Morall, was published in 1625 with 58 essays. Bacon considered the Essays "but as recreation of my other studies", and they draw on previous writers such as Michel de Montaigne and Aristotle. The Essays were praised by his contemporaries and have remained in high repute ever since; 19th-century literary historian Henry Hallam wrote that "They are deeper and more discriminating than any earlier, or almost any later, work in the English language".

Bacon's coinages such as "hostages to fortune" and "jesting Pilate" have survived into modern English, with 91 quotations from the Essays in the 1999 edition of The Oxford Dictionary of Quotations, and the statue of Philosophy in the U.S. Library of Congress, in Washington, D.C., is labelled with quotation "the inquiry, knowledge, and belief of truth is the sovereign good of human nature" from Of Truth. The 1625 essay Of Gardens, in which Bacon says that "God Almighty first planted a Garden; and it is indeed the purest of human pleasures [...], the greatest refreshment to the spirits of man", was influential upon the imagination of subsequent garden owners in England.

=== The Wisdom of the Ancients ===
The Wisdom of the Ancients is a book written by Bacon in 1609, and published in Latin, in which he claims playfully to unveil the hidden meanings and teachings behind ancient Greek fables. The book opens with two dedications: one to the Earl of Salisbury, the other to the University of Cambridge. This is followed by a detailed preface, in which Bacon explains how ancient wisdom is contained within the fables. He opens the preface stating that fables are the poets' veiling of the "most ancient times that are buried in oblivion and silence".

He retells thirty-one ancient fables, suggesting that they contain hidden teachings on varied issues such as morality, philosophy, religion, civility, politics, science, and art. In doing this, Bacon advocates for a break from the past while also imagining connection to "an ancient, but previously lost, precedent for free inquiry".

This work, not having a strictly scientific nature as other better-known works, has been reputed among Bacon's literary works. However, two of the chapters, "Cupid; or the Atom", and "Proteus; or Matter" may be considered part of Bacon's scientific philosophy. Bacon describes in "Cupid" his vision of the nature of the atom and of matter itself. 'Love' is described as the force or the "instinct" of primal matter, "the natural motion of the atom", "the summary law of nature, that impulse of desire impressed by God upon the primary particles of matter which makes them come together, and which by repetition and multiplication produces all the variety of nature", "a thing which mortal thought may glance at, but can hardly take in".

The myth of Proteus serves, according to Bacon, to adumbrate the path to extracting truth from matter. In his interpretation of the myth, Bacon finds Proteus to symbolize all matter in the universe: "For the person of Proteus denotes matter, the oldest of all things, after God himself; that resides, as in a cave, under the vast concavity of the heavens" Much of Bacon's explanation of the myth deals with Proteus's ability to elude his would-be captors by shifting into various forms: "But if any skillful minister of nature shall apply force to matter, and by design torture and vex it…it, on the contrary…changes and transforms itself into a strange variety of shapes and appearances…so that at length, running through the whole circle of transformations, and completing its period, it in some degree restores itself, if the force be continued."

(See Wisdom of the Ancients in Wikisource.)

=== Masculine Birth of Time ===
In Temporis Partus Masculus (The Masculine Birth of Time, 1603), a posthumously published text, Bacon first writes about the relationship between science and religion. The text consists of an elderly teacher's lecturing his student on the dangers of classical philosophy. Through the voice of the teacher, Bacon demands a split between religion and science: "By mixing the divine with the natural, the profane with the sacred, heresies with mythology, you have corrupted, O you sacrilegious impostor, both human and religious truth."

Much of the text consists of the elderly guide tracing the corruption of human knowledge though classical philosopher to a contemporary alchemist. Bacon's elderly guide commences his diatribe against ancient philosophers with Aristotle, who initially leads, for Bacon, the human mind awry by turning its attention toward words: "Just when the human mind, borne thither by some favoring gale, had found the rest in a little truth, this man presumed to cast the closest fetters on our understandings. He composed an art or manual of madness and made us slaves to words." As Bacon develops further throughout his scientific treatises, Aristotle's crime of duping the intellect into the belief that words possess an intrinsic connection with Nature confused the subjective and the objective. The text identifies the goal of the elderly guide's instructions as the student's ability to engage in a (re)productive relationship with Nature: "My dear, dear boy, what I propose is to unite you with things themselves in a chaste, holy, and legal wedlock." Although, as the text presents it, the student has not yet reached that point of intellectual and sexual maturity, the elderly guide assures him that once he has properly distanced himself from Nature he will then be able to bring forth "a blessed race of Heroes and Supermen who will overcome the immeasurable helplessness and poverty of the human race."

=== Meditationes Sacrae ===
A collection of religious meditations by Lord Bacon, published in 1597.

Among the texts of his Sacred Meditations are:

- Of The Works of God and Man
- Of The Miracles of our Saviour
- Of The Innocence of the Dove, and the Wisdom of the Serpent
- Of The Exaltation of Charity
- Of The Moderation of Cares
- Of Earthly Hope
- Of Hypocrites
- Of Impostors
- Of Several kinds of imposture
- Of Atheism
- Of Heresies
- Of The Church and the Scriptures

=== Theological Tracts ===
Collection of Lord Bacon's prayers, published after his death.

Among the prayers of his Theological Tracts are:

- A Prayer, or Psalm, made by the Lord Bacon, Chancellor of England
- A Prayer made and used by the Lord Chancellor Bacon
- The Student's Prayer
- The Writer's Prayer
- A Confession of Faith

=== An Advertisement Touching a Holy War ===
This treatise, that is among those which were published after Bacon's death and were left unfinished, is written in the form of debate. In it, there are six characters, each representing a sector of society: Eusebius, Gamaliel, Zebedeus, Martius, Eupolis, and Pollio, representing respectively: a moderate divine, a Protestant zealot, a Roman Catholic zealot, a military man, a politician, and a courtier.

In the work, the six characters debate on whether it is lawful or not for Christendom to engage in a holy war against infidels, such as the Turks, for the purpose of an expansion of the Christian religion – many different arguments and viewpoints being expressed by the characters. The work is left unfinished; it does not come to a conclusive answer to the question in a debate.

Peter Linebaugh and Marcus Rediker have argued, based on this treatise, that Bacon was not as idealistic as his utopian works suggest, rather that he was what might today be considered an advocate of genocidal eugenics. They see in it a defense of the elimination of detrimental societal elements by the English and compared this to the endeavors of Hercules while establishing a civilized society in ancient Greece. The work itself, however, being a dialogue, expresses both militarists' and pacifists' discourses debating each other, and does not come to any conclusion since it was left unfinished.

Laurence Lampert has interpreted Bacon's treatise An Advertisement Touching a Holy War as advocating "spiritual warfare against the spiritual rulers of European civilization." This interpretation might be considered symbolical, for there is no hint of such an advocacy in the work itself.

The work was dedicated to Lancelot Andrews, Bishop of Winchester and counselor of the estate to King James.

==== Bacon's personal views on war and peace ====
While Bacon's personal views on war and peace might be dubious in some writings, he thus expressed them in a letter of advice to Sir George Villiers, the Duke of Buckingham:

For peace and war, and those things which appertain to either; I in my own disposition and profession am wholly for peace, if please God to bless his kingdom therewith, as for many years past he hath done [...] God is the God of peace; it is one of his attributes, therefore by him alone must we pray, and hope to continue it: there is the foundation. [...] (Concerning the establishment of colonies in the 'New World') To make no extirpation of the natives under the pretense of planting religion: God surely will no way be pleased with such sacrifices.

=== Translation of certain psalms into English verse ===
Published in 1625 and considered to be the last of his writings, Bacon translated 7 of the Psalms of David (numbers 1, 12, 90, 104, 126, 137, 149) to English in verse form, in which he shows his poetical skills.

(See it in Wikisource.)

== Juridical works ==
Bacon was also a jurist by profession, having written some works for the reform of English law. His legal work is considered to be in accordance to Natural law, having been influenced by legislators such as Cicero and Justinian.

He considered Law's fundamental tasks to be:

- To secure men's persons from death;
- To dispose of the property of their goods and lands;
- For preservation of their good names from shame and infamy.

One of his lines of argument, was that the law is the guardian of the rights of the people, and therefore should be simplified so every man could understand, as he expressed in a public speech on 26 February 1593:

Laws are made to guard the rights of the people, not to feed the lawyers. The laws should be read by all, known to all. Put them into shape, inform them with philosophy, reduce them in bulk, give them into every man's hand.

Basil Montagu, a later British jurist influenced by his legal work, characterised him as a "cautious, gradual, confident, permanent reformer", always based on his "love of excellence". Bacon suggested improvements both of the civil and criminal law; he proposed to reduce and compile the whole law; and in a tract upon universal justice, "Leges Legum", he planted a seed, which according to Montagu, was not dormant in the two following centuries. He was attentive to the ultimate and to the immediate improvement of the law, the ultimate improvement depending upon the progress of knowledge, and the immediate improvement upon the knowledge by its professors in power, of the local law, the principles of legislation, and general science.

Among lawyers, Bacon was probably best known for his genius at stating the principles and philosophy of the law in concise, memorable and quotable aphorisms, and for his efforts as Lord Chancellor to strengthen equity jurisprudence and check the power of the common law judges. As Lord Chancellor under James I, Bacon presided over the equity courts as the "Keeper of the King's Conscience". In this role he frequently came into conflict with Sir Edward Coke, who headed the common law courts.

In a letter to Bishop Lancelot Andrews, Bacon spoke of his juridical works as being a thoughtful action aiming the general good of men in society and the dowries of government, saying that "having in the work of mine Instauration had in contemplation the general good of men in their very being, and the dowries of nature; and in my work of laws, the general good of men likewise in society, and the dowries of government; I thought in duty I owed somewhat unto my own country, which I ever loved".

His most important juridical works are: The Elements of the Common Laws of England, Maxims of the Law, Cases of Treason and the Learned Reading of Sir Francis Bacon upon the Statute of Uses.

== See also ==
- Francis Bacon bibliography

== Bibliography ==
- Farrington, Benjamin (1964). The Philosophy of Francis Bacon; an Essay on Its Development from 1603 to 1609. Liverpool: Liverpool University Press.
