= Swan Village Gas Works =

Coordinates: 52.528°N 2.012°W

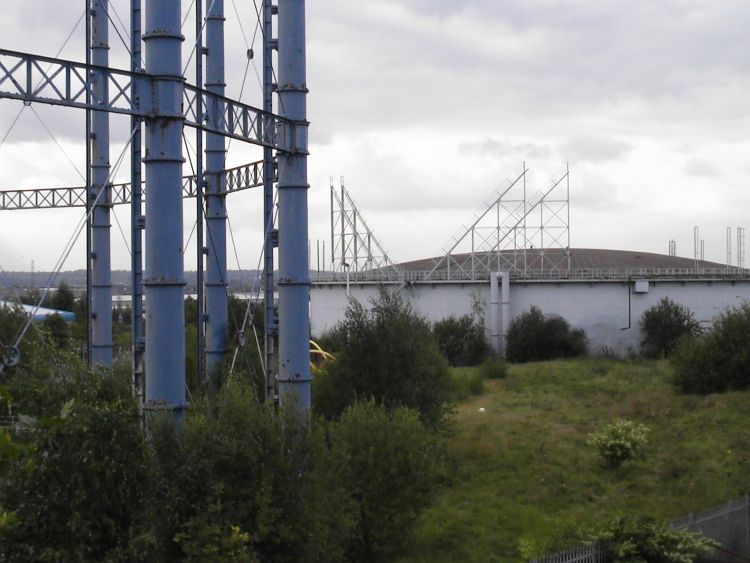
The remains of the works today

Swan Village Gas Works, is a historical manufacturing plant in West Bromwich for the production of coal gas, or "town gas". The works are situated in Swan Village, a part of West Bromwich in the metropolitan borough of Sandwell. Most of the works have been demolished although a few relics survive. Parts of the works are still in operation as part of the National Grid.

== History ==
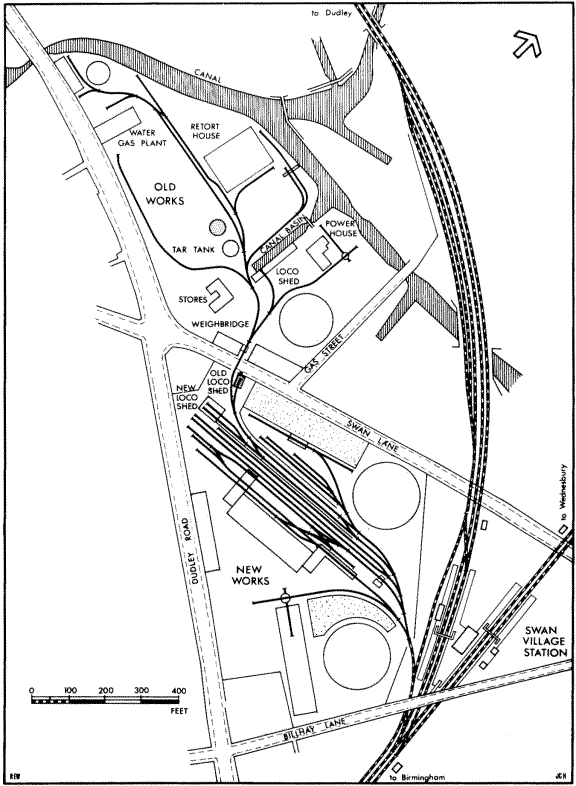
A map of the works

In 1825, the Birmingham and Staffordshire Gas Light Company was founded by act of parliament to manufacture and supply gas to Birmingham and surrounding towns, including West Bromwich; lighting the main road through the town was also mentioned in the Act. The Old Works were the first part of the complex to be constructed, and when completed in 1829 were the largest in the country.

Coal was delivered to the Old Works by the Ridgacre Canal at a basin connected to the canal constructed for loading and unloading coal barges. The railway arrived in 1854 with the opening of the Great Western Railway's Birmingham to Wolverhampton line. Swan Village Station was situated on the line next to the works. From the station branched the Great Bridge line linking up with the South Staffordshire Line which ran to Dudley. The Swan Village Basin line branched off into the works just before the station. The branch was solely used for freight transportation only.

With the railways in place, more gas production was possible, lowering the price of gas for consumers. Canal traffic diminished. The photograph on the right shows the works with the Swan Village Basin line feeding into the complex. The gas holder on the right still exists, albeit empty hence why it is missing height.

Over the years, changing working patterns and the increase in demand for gas following nationalisation in 1949 meant that the works needed to expand. A decision was made by the Gas committee of Birmingham City Council, and the New Works were opened in 1953. Surplus land bought a century and a quarter previously allowed for expansion. The increased rail traffic necessitated extensive new sidings outside the works to accommodate additional wagons.

With the discovery of natural gas in the North Sea during the 1960s, coal gas became a thing of the past. The development of the National Grid meant that delivering coal by railway was no longer required and the Swan Village Basin line was removed. The Great Bridge line closed in 1964 as a result of the Beeching cuts, with Swan Village Station eventually closing in 1972.

== Remains ==
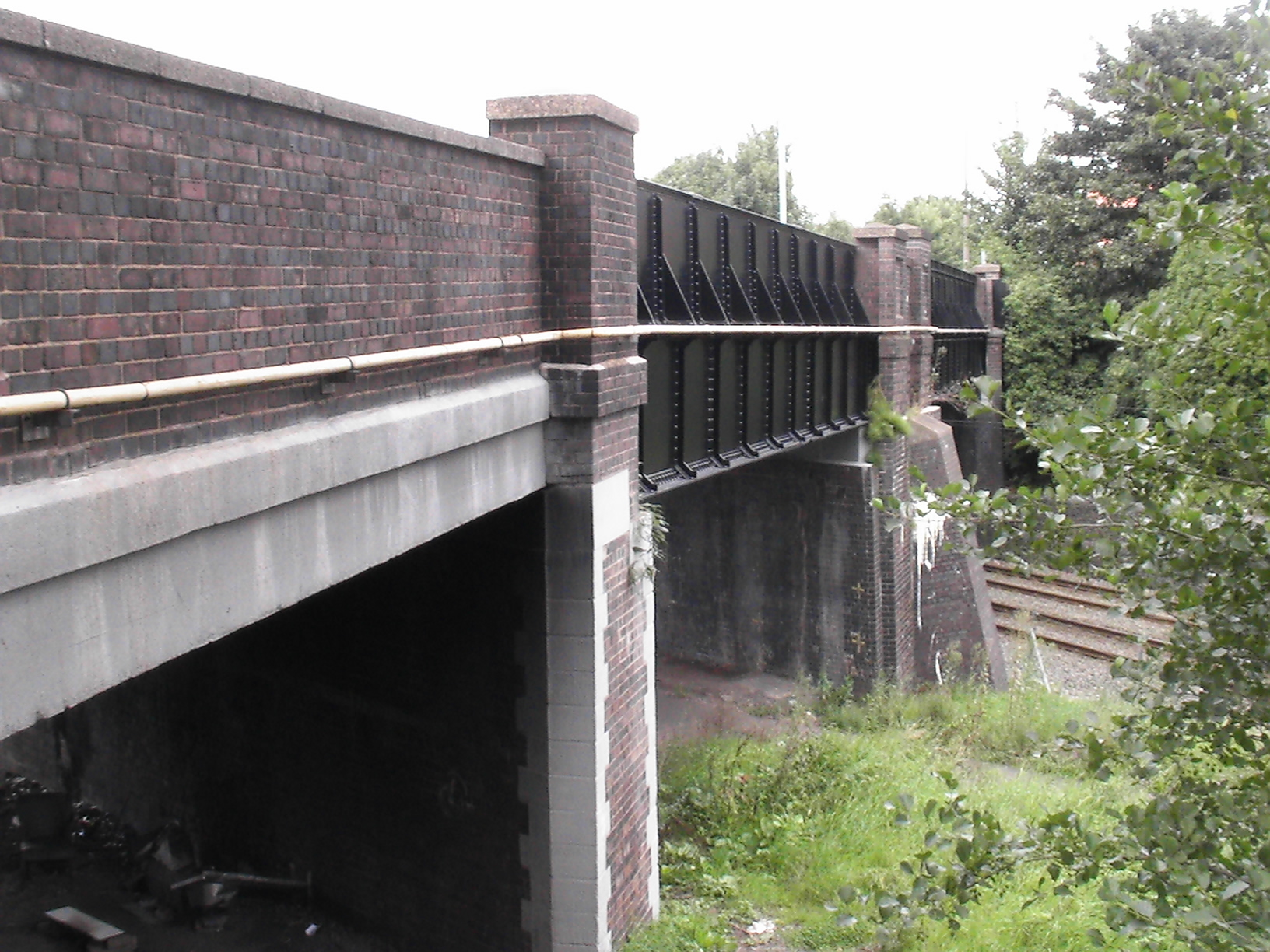
The extra arches that carried the converging railway at Bilhay Lane

Little is left of the works. The Old Works were demolished as the area around Swan Village was developed into an industrial estate. The only surviving relics of the New Works are two gas holders and some brickwork on what remains of the original route of Swan Lane, the lane has fallen victim to industrial development. A third gas holder was installed at a later date, but has since been demolished.

The only remains of the Swan Lane Basin and Great Bridge railway lines are extra gaps under the bridge on Bilhay Lane where the lines converged with GWR's Birmingham to Wolverhampton line, which still exists as Line 1 of the West Midlands Metro. Embankments around the site offer clues to the paths of the original railway. The construction of modern Swan Lane has obliterated any signs thatthere was a level crossing by the Old Loco Shed.

New buildings have been built on the site of the New Works in between the old gas holders, that operate as the Sandwell Station on the National Grid.

One of the small steam locomotives that shunted the gas works sidings, Peckett 0-4-0ST 2018/1947, is preserved at the Foxfield Railway, Blythe Bridge, Staffordshire.

== See also ==
- Town Gas
- Natural Gas

== Photographs ==
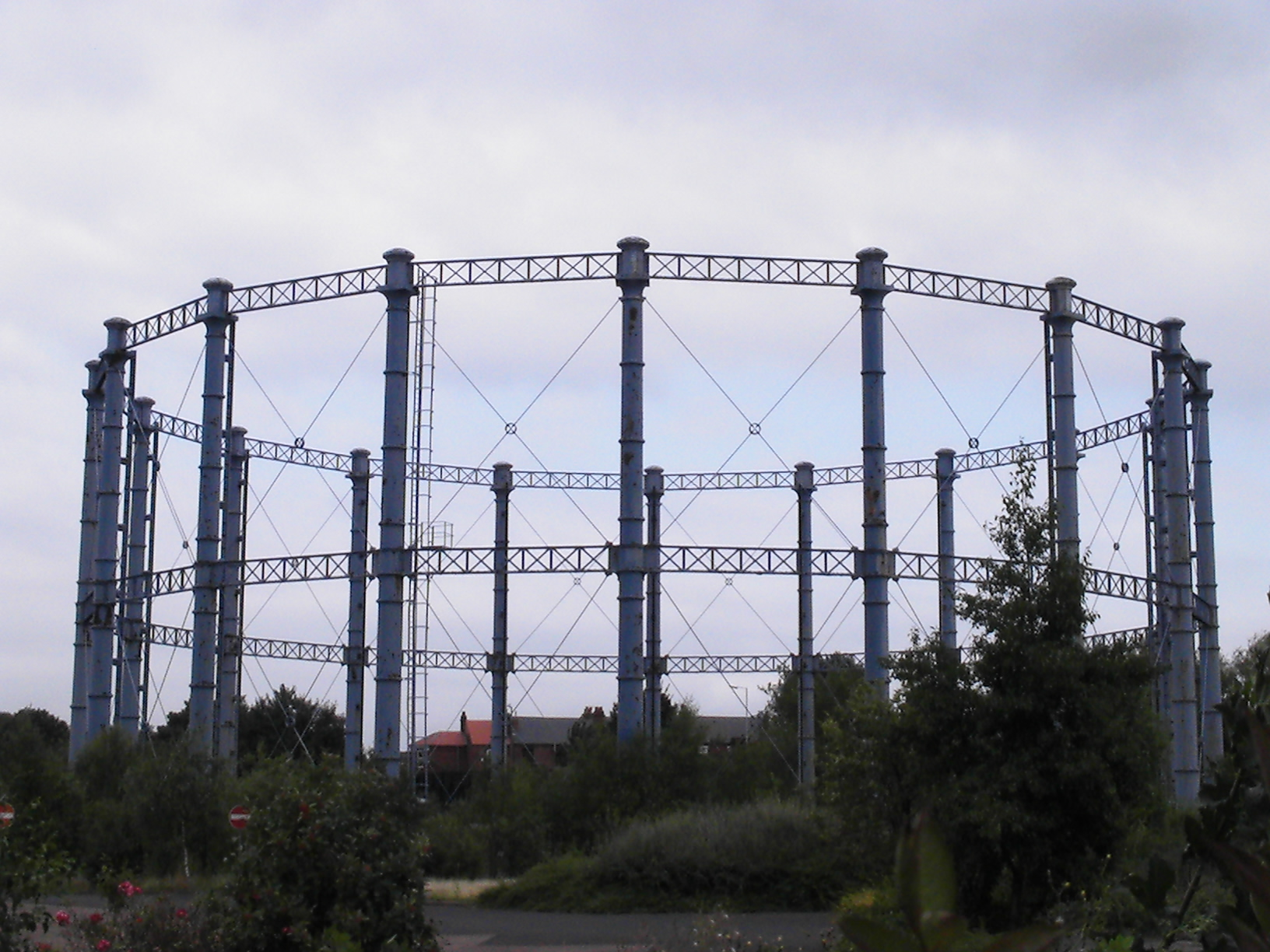
Remaining gas holder from the New Works.

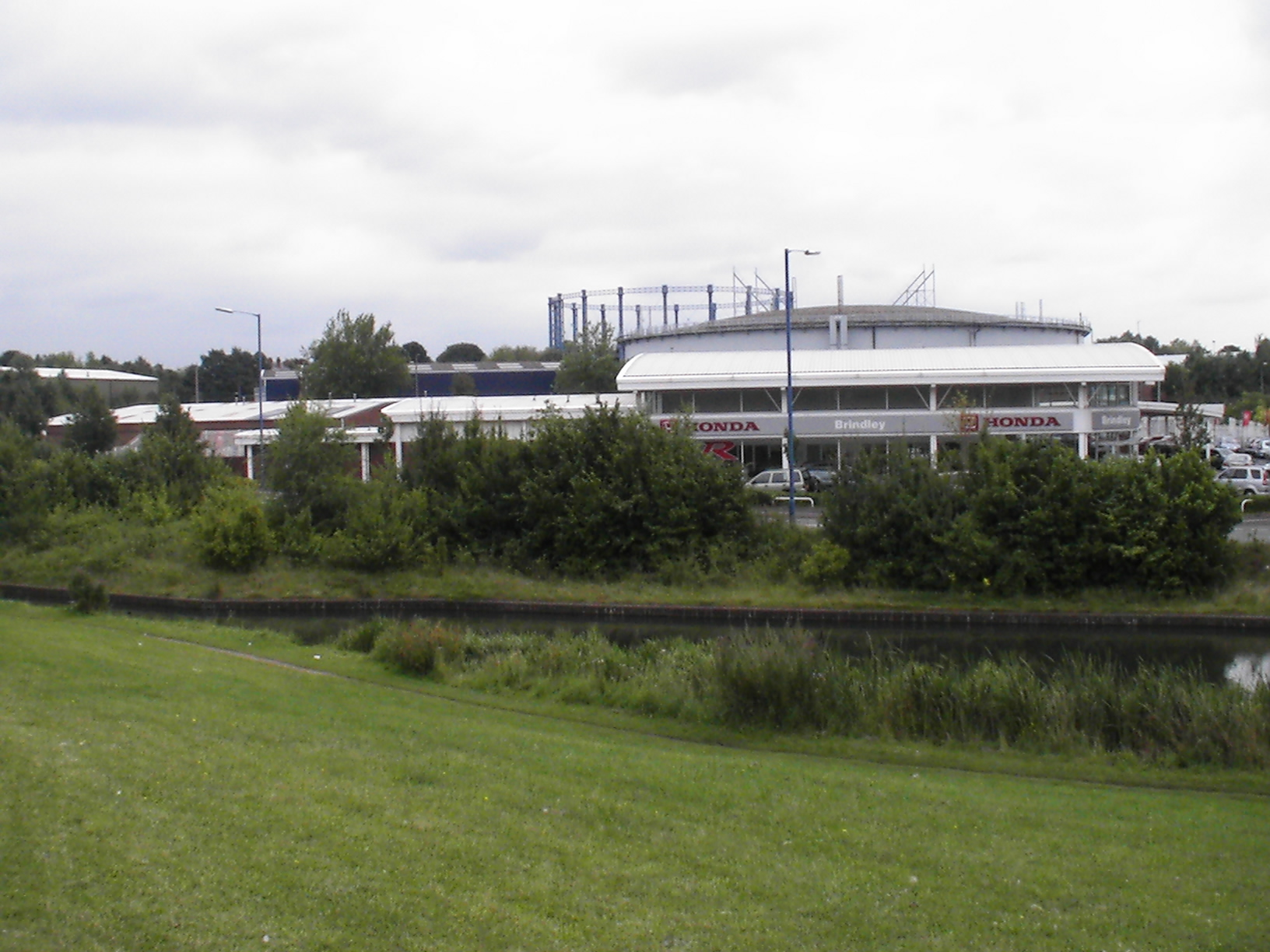
Embankment on the former Great Bridge line where it crossed the Ridgacre canal.

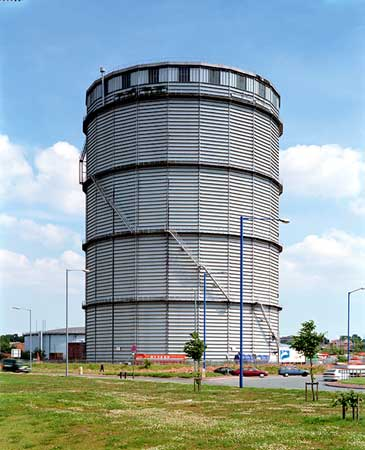
This gas holder has since been demolished although it was a late addition to the works.
