= Alice Mary Hadfield =

British book editor and writer (1908–1989)

- Alice Mary Hadfield by Lynton Lamb, oil on canvas
- Born: Alice Mary Smyth; 14 December 1908; Cirencester, Gloucestershire, England
- Died: 28 August 1989 (aged 80); Cirencester, Gloucestershire, England
- Education: University of Oxford; Mount Holyoke College
- Spouses: Peter Miller; Charles Hadfield

Alice Mary Hadfield (14 December 1908 – 28 August 1989), born Alice Mary Smyth, was a British book editor and writer, the co-ordinating editor of the first edition of The Oxford Dictionary of Quotations (1941), and the librarian at Oxford University Press's Amen House. She was also the founder, with her husband Charles Hadfield, of the South Cerney Trust in 1963.

== Early life ==
Hadfield was born Alice Mary Smyth in Cirencester on 14 December 1908. She was educated at Oxford University and Mount Holyoke College, Massachusetts. Her first husband, Peter Miller, was killed during the Second World War, near Amiens at the retreat to Dunkirk in 1940. After this she went to Bermuda with her baby daughter Laura, where she worked in the British code breaking service. On the journey, her convoy was attacked by U-boats and the ship next to hers was sunk.

== Second marriage ==
Hadfield's second marriage was to the canal historian Charles Hadfield (1909–1996), co-founder of the publishers David & Charles, in Paddington in 1945. It was the second marriage for both of them. They lived in London and had two sons, one of whom died when still a baby, a daughter and adopted another son. They were both influenced by the ideas on Romantic Theology developed by Charles Williams who Alice Mary had met when he had been a member of the original committee on the contents of The Oxford Dictionary of Quotations, and they practised in their marriage his theories of Co-inherence and the Way of Exchange.

== Career ==
Hadfield replaced Phyllis Jones as librarian at Amen House for Oxford University Press. She was also co-ordinating editor of the first edition of The Oxford Dictionary of Quotations (1941).

Her first published work was What happens next (A novel), published by Falcon Press in 1950. She wrote on a diverse range of subjects that included British and local history, particularly of her native Cotswolds, produced a number of works with her husband, who was an expert on British canals, and wrote a children's series known as "The Williver chronicles". She produced a retelling of the stories of King Arthur and a scholarly study of The Chartist Land Company. Her last book was a biographical study of Charles Williams, finished with the help of her husband as her faculties were beginning to fail, and her last work was an edited edition of Williams's Outlines of romantic theology.

== Societies ==
Hadfield and her husband founded two societies, the South Cerney Trust in 1963, and the Charles Williams Society in 1975.

== Death ==
Hadfield died in Cirencester on 28 August 1989.

== Selected publications ==
=== As editor ===
- The Oxford Dictionary of Quotations. Oxford University Press, London, 1941.
- Outlines of romantic theology: With which is reprinted Religion and love in Dante: the theology of romantic love. W.B. Eerdmans, Grand Rapids, 1990. (Hadfield also wrote the introduction) ISBN 0802836798

=== As author ===
- What happens next (A novel). Falcon Press, London, 1950.
- King Arthur and the round table. Dent, London, 1953. (Adapted from the works of Malory and other sources)
- An introduction to Charles Williams. Hale, London, 1959.
- Time to finish the game: The English and the Armada. 1964.
- Williver's luck. Chatto & Windus, London, 1964.
- Williver's quest. Chatto & Windus, London, 1965.
- The Cotswolds. Batsford, London, 1966. (With Charles Hadfield)
- Williver's return. Chatto & Windus, London, 1967.
- Cirencester: the Roman Corinium, Gloucestershire - the official guide. British Publishing, Gloucester, 1970. ISBN 0714002267 (new edition 1975)
- The Chartist Land Company. David & Charles, Newton Abbot, 1970. ISBN 0715348728
- The Cotswolds: A new study. David & Charles, 1973. (With Charles Hadfield) ISBN 0715362240
- Introducing the Cotswolds. David & Charles, 1976. (With Charles Hadfield) ISBN 071537169X
- Afloat in America: Two enthusiasts explore the United States and Canada by waterway and rail. David & Charles, Newton Abbot, 1979. (With Charles Hadfield) ISBN 0715379100
- Charles Williams: An exploration of his life and work. Oxford University Press, Oxford, 1983. ISBN 0195033116
