= Wednesbury Old Canal =

Canal in the West Midlands, England

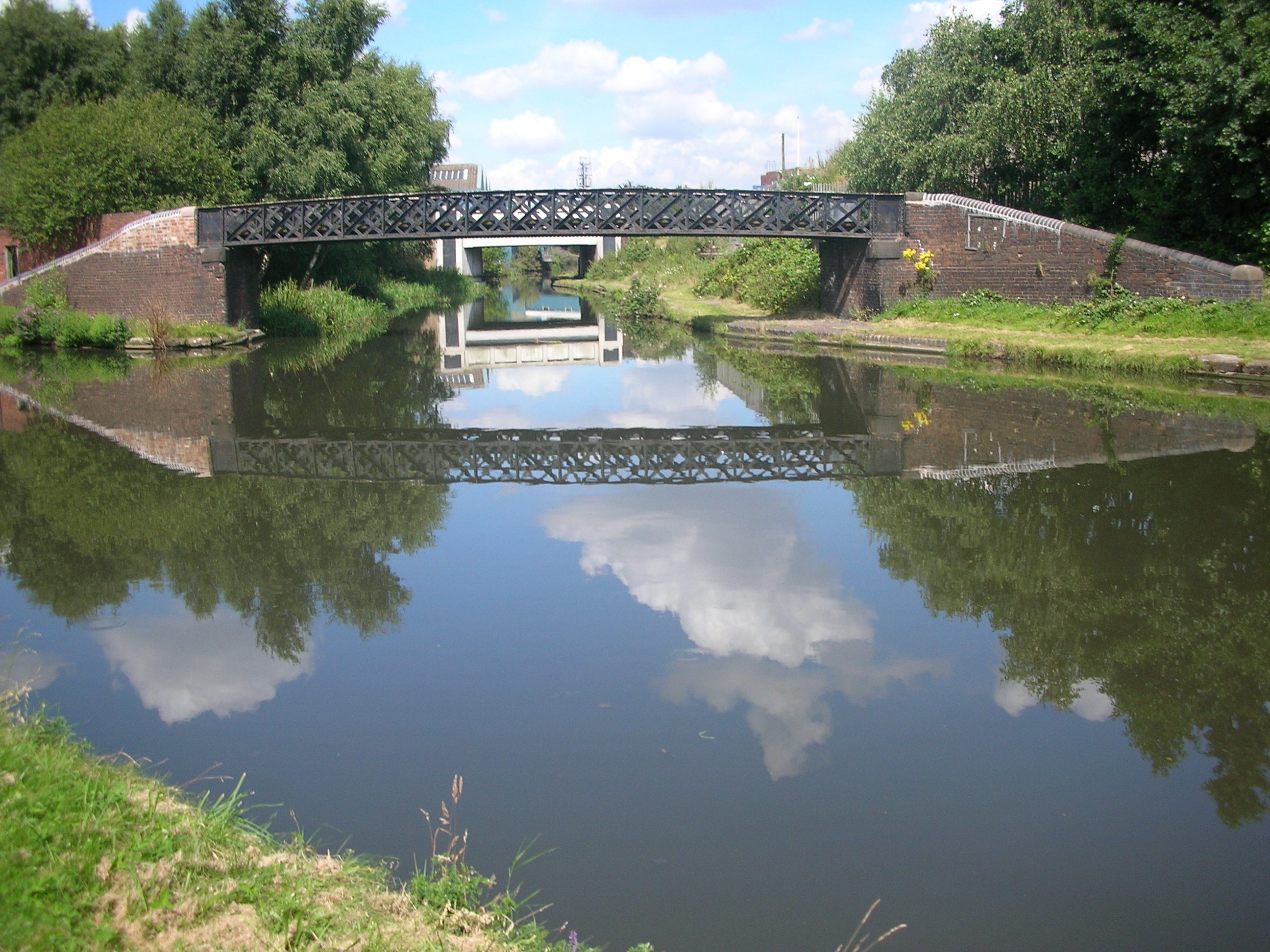
- Pudding Green Junction. The Wednesbury Old Canal leads under the bridge from the BCN Main Line, which runs left and right
- Interactive map of Wednesbury Old Canal

Specifications
- Length: 4.4 miles (7.1 km)
- Status: part open, part dry
- Navigation authority: Canal and River Trust

History
- Principal engineer: James Brindley
- Date of act: 1768
- Date of first use: 1769
- Date closed: 1955, 1960

Geography
- Start point: Pudding Green Junction (originally Spon Lane Junction)
- End point: Balls Hill Basin
- Branch of: Birmingham Canal Navigations

Map of Wednesbury Canal (outlined in yellow) and its modern neighbours. Wednesbury Old Canal as it stands today is shown in pink/yellow.

Wednesbury Old Canal is part of the Birmingham Canal Navigations (BCN) in the English West Midlands. It opened in 1769, and although parts of it were abandoned in 1955 and 1960, the section between Pudding Green Junction and Ryder's Green Junction is navigable, as it provides a link to the Walsall Canal. A short stub beyond Ryder's Green Junction is connected to the network but difficult to navigate.

== Route ==
Wednesbury Old Canal leaves the Birmingham Canal Navigations main line at Pudding Green Junction. There is a towpath bridge over the junction, and almost immediately, the canal is crossed by Albion Road bridge. In the 1900s, this was a site of industrial activity, with the Albion Blue Brick & Tile Works to the east of the canal, served by a basin, the Roway Iron Works to the west, served by a basin, and a coal pit to the east, again with a basin. Other premises included Nelson Iron Works, Wood Lane Iron Works, Vulcan Tube Works and Bushfarm Iron Works, most of which had small basins. The canal then passed under Greets Green Road. Heavy industry has been replaced by industrial units. The towpath is initially on the east bank, but crosses to the west at a turnover bridge, after passing Conveyor Bridge. The area is part of Greets Green, and the bridge carrying Greets Green Road is now called Belper Bridge.

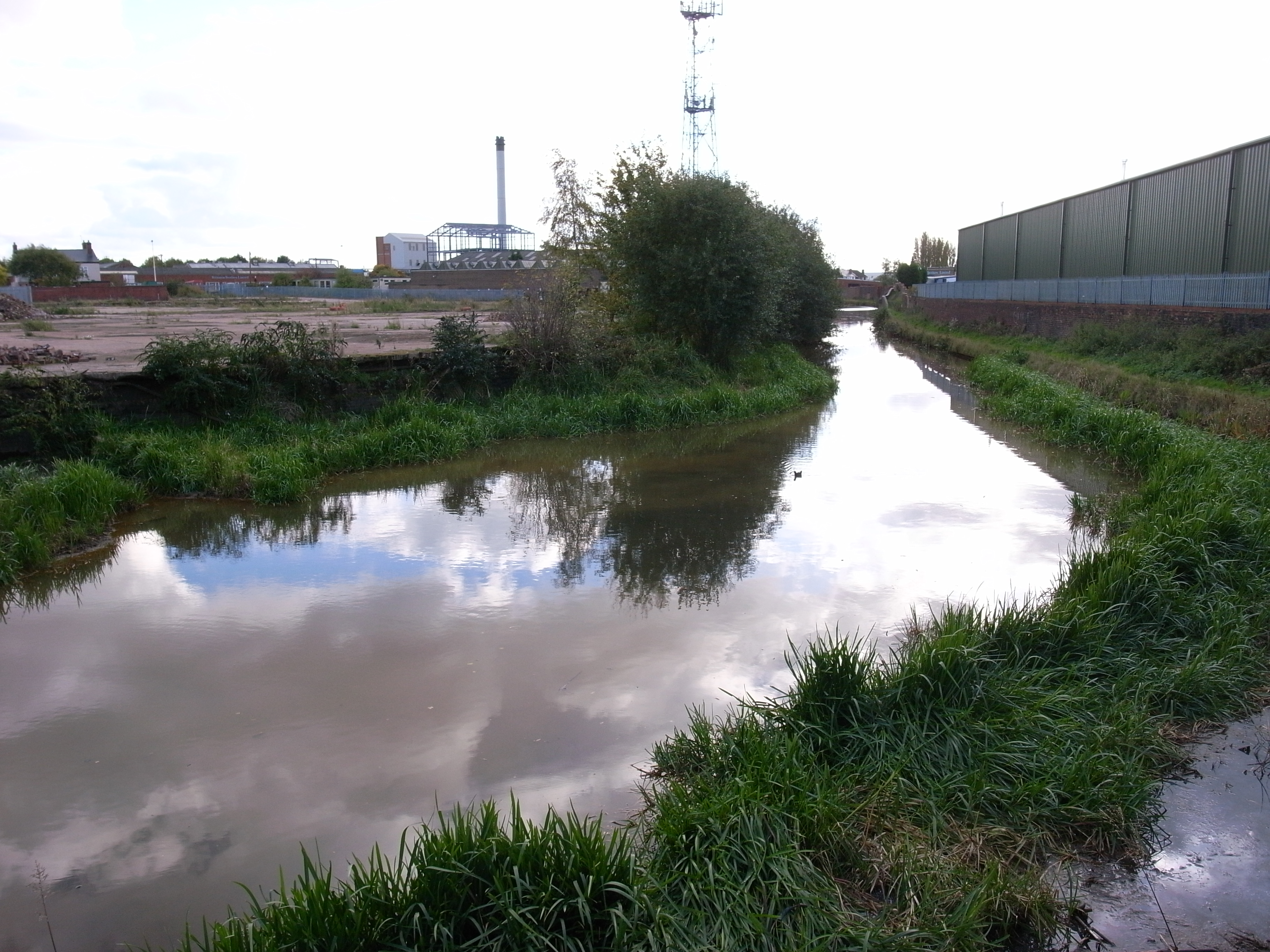
The remains of the canal east of Ryders Green Junction

To the north of the bridge were the four Greets Green basins, which served collieries. They have all gone, and a footbridge crosses the canal near the former site of Ryders Green Tar Works. At Ryders Green Junction the Walsall Canal begins its descent down the eight Ryder's Green Locks. Just before the locks Wednesbury Old Canal veers off and commences its meandering route through Swan Village. It is crossed by Hadley Bridge, carrying the B4149 Phoenix Road and by Swan Bridge, carrying Great Bridge Street. There is a winding hole beyond the bridge, after which further progress is blocked by the low bridge of the Black Country Spine Road. The bridge is on the site of Swan Bridge Junction, where the Ridgacre Branch continued to the east and the Wednesbury Old Canal turned to the north. The canal beyond Swan Bridge Junction was also known as the Balls Hill Branch.

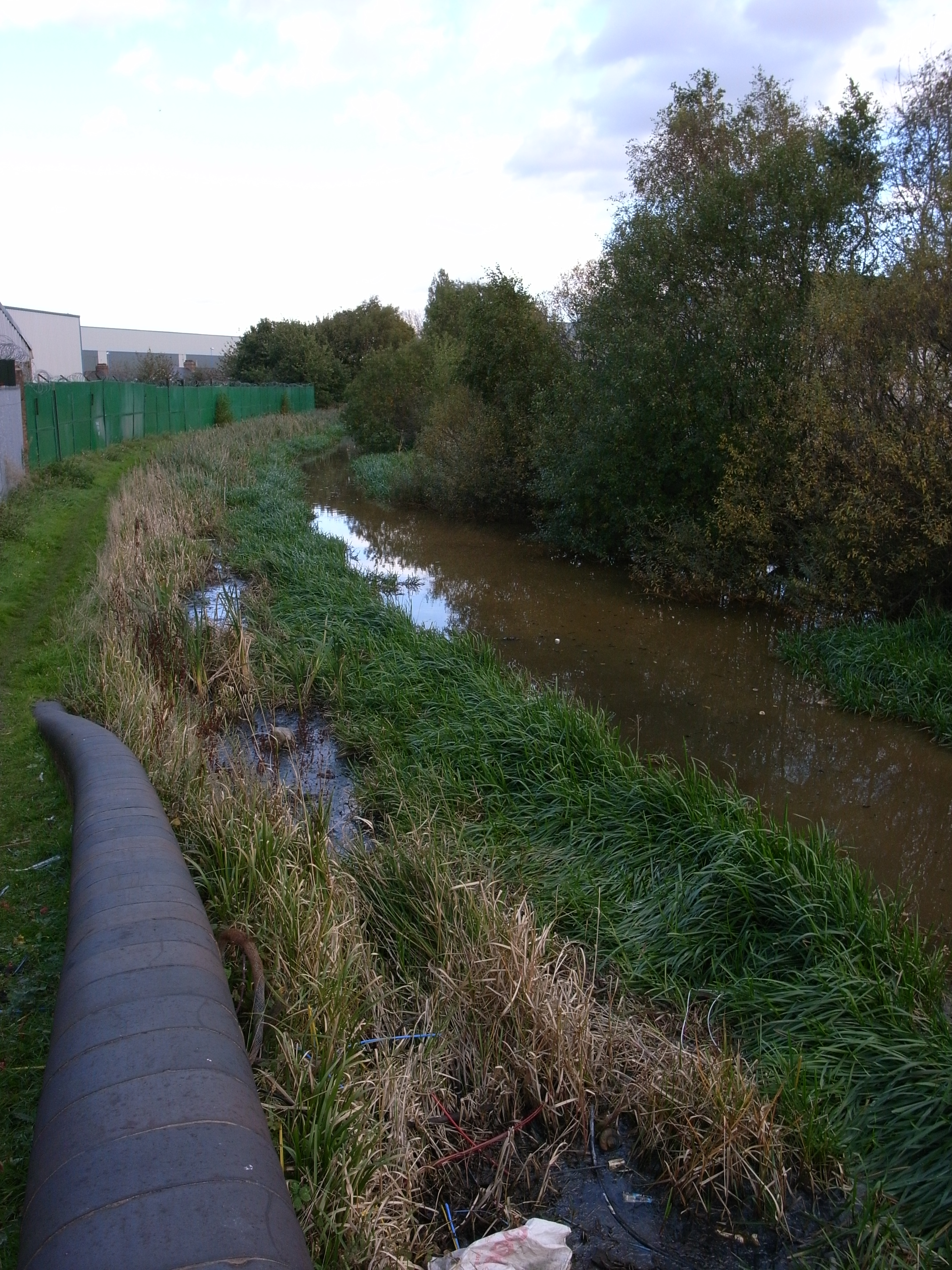
The barely navigable remains of the canal viewed from the same point in the opposite direction

Continuing to the north, the Great Bridge Branch railway crossed the canal and there was an interchange basin with the railway before the bridge. The canal turned to the north-west, before turning sharply to the south-west. This section is visible as a tree-lined corridor. The canal looped southwards around St. Mary's Church, and turned northwards, where it was crossed by Bagnall Street at Golds Green. To the north of Golds Green, Shaw Street crossed at Golds Hill Bridge, and the canal wove its way around a foundry, to end at Balls Hill Basin, now lost beneath housing at Hill Top, near the A4196 Holloway Bank. Much of the route is still visible in the landscape, either because of the way in which buildings follow its course, or because it is now green space.

The Wednesbury Canal is dry from Swan Bridge onwards, but the Ridgacre Branch continues, with its main line watered for most of its original length. Although inaccessible to boats, it is now used for fishing, for walking, and is a valued wildlife habitat.

Some modern sources mark the Ridgacre as starting at Ryder's Green Junction but this is not historically correct.

== History ==
The Wednesbury Canal was part of the first phase of the Birmingham Canal (the first around the Black Country or Birmingham). The Birmingham Canal Navigation Act 1768 (8 Geo. 3. c. 38) authorised construction of the Birmingham Canal and branches to Wednesbury and Ocker Hill. On 6 November 1769 the Wednesbury Branch was completed, and coal could be delivered from the Wednesbury collieries to Paradise Street, some 10 miles (16 km) away. A poem was published celebrating the reduction in retail coal prices to mark the event. It was another three years before the Birmingham Canal reached Wolverhampton, with the final flight of locks opening on 21 September 1772.

It started at what is now Spon Lane Junction on the Wolverhampton Level and descended the three remaining Spon Lane locks to the Birmingham Level. Its length was 4.4 miles (7.1 km). It terminated at Balls Hill Basin, not far from the later Tame Valley Canal.

The Ridgacre Branch opened in 1826 and was 0.75 miles (1.2 km) in length. It ran from the Wednesbury Old Canal at Swan Bridge Junction, a short distance north of the New Swan Lane / Black Country New Road roundabout. It had two branches, with the Dartmouth Branch running northwards and the Halford Branch running southwards to collieries.

In 1824, Thomas Telford was asked to suggest ways to improve the Birmingham Canal Navigation's main line. His solution was to cut a new main line, sometimes known as the 'Island Line', from Tipton Factory Locks towards Spon Lane bottom lock. It would be much straighter, and use cuttings and embankments to avoid the use of locks. By the time it was finished in 1838, it had reduced the distance from Tipton Factory Junction to Bromford Junction, at the bottom of Spon Lane locks, by 7 miles (11 km) to 15.6 miles (25.1 km). It cut into the original Wednesbury Canal, forming Pudding Lane Junction, and the short, curved length of the Wednesbury Canal between there and Bromford Junction was bypassed. It was still serving Brandon Colliery and Izon's Foundry in 1904, and was not formally abandoned until 1954, as a result of the British Transport Commission Act 1954 (2 & 3 Eliz. 2. c. lv).

Parts of the Wednesbury Old Canal were abandoned as a result of acts of Parliament passed in 1954 and 1960. The section from Brickhouse Lane Bridge to its terminus near Holloway Bank was closed under the British Transport Commission Act 1954, while the British Transport Commission Act 1960 (8 & 9 Eliz. 2. c. xlvii) closed the section from Brickhouse Lane to the railway bridge carrying the line from Great Bridge to Swan Village. Recent road developments at Swan Bridge Junction have severed the connection to the remaining, navigable canal, and have also severed the Ridgacre Branch from the canal network.

When plans were drawn up for the Black Country Spine Road in 1992, they included the provision of a navigable culvert under the road near the Swan Bridge roundabout, with headroom of 8.2 feet (2.5 m). The canal would have been made narrower, to make the bridge construction easier. The existing junction with the turning head for the Balls Hill Branch would have been closed and a new entrance created slightly further to the east, with a new towpath bridge built over the entrance. However, the deposited plans were not followed when the new road was built, and the bridges didn't allow enough headroom for boats to pass, effectively closing the Ridgacre Branch. In practice, even the section up to the new bridge is badly overgrown and unlikely to be navigable throughout.

== Wednesbury Canal original features ==
Point	Coordinates (Links to map resources)	OS Grid Ref	Notes
Balls Hill Basin	52.5401°N 2.0161°W	SO989936	Original terminus
Site of GWR aqueduct	52.5401°N 2.0168°W	SO98959358	
Balls Hill Branch route (dry) 9	52.5401°N 2.0172°W	SO98939358	
Balls Hill Branch route (dry) 8	52.5414°N 2.0183°W	SO98859372	
Balls Hill Branch route (dry) 7	52.5402°N 2.0227°W	SO98559359	
Balls Hill Branch route (dry) 6	52.5395°N 2.0267°W	SO98289351	
Balls Hill Branch route (dry) 5	52.5374°N 2.0250°W	SO98409328	
Balls Hill Branch route (dry) 4	52.5323°N 2.0274°W	SO98239271	
Balls Hill Branch route (dry) 3	52.5322°N 2.0243°W	SO98449270	
Balls Hill Branch route (dry) 2	52.5334°N 2.0227°W	SO98559283	
Balls Hill Branch route (dry) 1	52.5305°N 2.0174°W	SO98919251	
Site of Swan Village Basin	52.5301°N 2.0184°W	SO98849247	GWR interchange basin
Swan Bridge Junction	52.5294°N 2.0163°W	SO988924	Culverted
Ridgacre Branch	52.5294°N 2.0157°W	SO989924	
Black Country New Road	52.5292°N 2.0170°W	SO988924	Obstructs canal
Ryder's Green Junction	52.5228°N 2.0221°W	SO985916	Walsall Canal
Pudding Green Junction	52.5139°N 2.0168°W	SO988907	BCN New Main Line (Island Line)
Lost loop	52.5123°N 2.0147°W	SO99099049	
Bromford Junction	52.5070°N 2.0051°W	SO996899	
Spon Lane bottom lock	52.5071°N 2.0041°W	SO997899	
Spon Lane middle lock	52.5070°N 1.9994°W	SP000899	
Spon Lane top lock	52.5067°N 1.9956°W	SP002899	
Spon Lane Junction	52.5066°N 1.9951°W	SP003898	BCN Old Main Line

== See also ==
- Canals of the United Kingdom
- History of the British canal system

== Bibliography ==
- Broadbridge, S. R. (1974). The Birmingham Canal Navigations, Vol. 1 1768 - 1846. David & Charles. ISBN 978-0-7509-2077-3.
- Dean, Richard (1989). Historical Map of the Birmingham Canals. M. & M. Baldwin. ISBN 978-0-947712-08-2.
- Hadfield, Charles (1985). The Canals of the West Midlands. David and Charles. ISBN 978-0-7153-8644-6.
- Nicholson (2014). Nicholson Guides Vol 2: Severn Avon and Birmingham. Harper Collins. ISBN 978-0-00-753898-0.
- Ordnance Survey Six Inch Series (1:10,560), Map SO99SE, 1955
- Richardson, Eric (1996). In Search of the Lost Canals of the Black Country. The Black Country Society. ISBN 978-0-904015-40-9.
