= Francis Bacon bibliography =

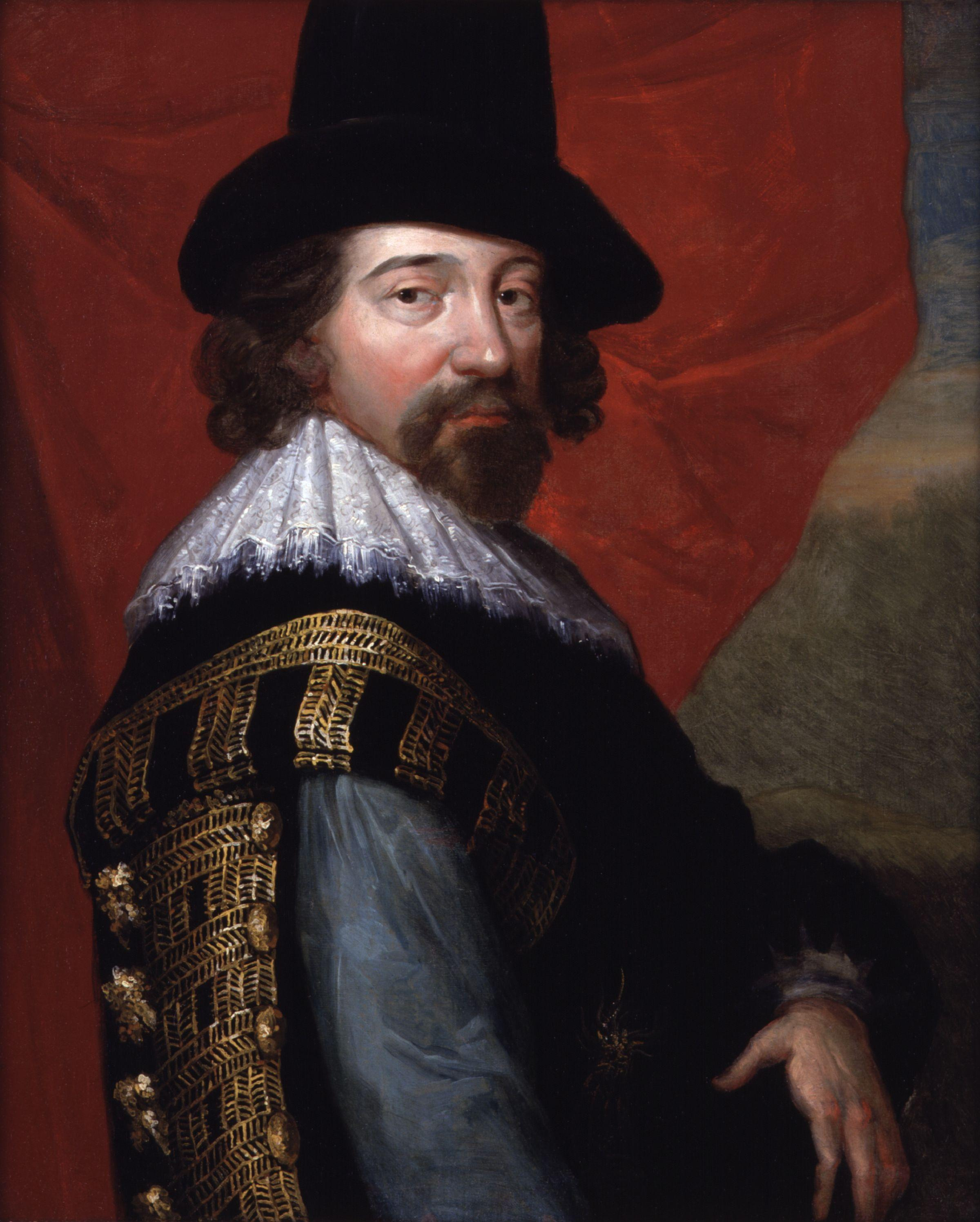
Portrait of Francis Bacon, Viscount St Alban, by John Vanderbank, circa 1731, after a portrait by an unknown artist (circa 1618).

This is a complete chronological bibliography of Francis Bacon. Many of Bacon's writings were only published after his death in 1626.

== Prior to 1625 ==
- Notes on the State of Christendom (1582)
- Letter of Advice to the Queen (1585–6)
- An Advertisement Touching the Controversies of the Church of England (1586–9)
- Dumb shows in the Misfortunes of Arthur (1587–8)
- A Conference of Pleasure: In Praise of Knowledge, In Praise of Fortitude, In Praise of Love, In Praise of Truth (1592)
- Certain Observations made upon a Libel (1592)
- Temporis Partus Maximus ('The Greatest Birth of Time'; 1593)
- A True Report of the Detestable Treason intended by Dr Roderigo Lopez (1594)
- The Device of the Indian Prince : Squire, Hermit, Soldier, Statesman (1594)
- Gray's Inn Christmas/New Year Revels: The High and Mighty Prince Henry, Prince of Purpoole (1594–5)
- The Honourable Order of the Knights of the Helmet (1595)
- The Sussex Speech (1595)
- Maxims of the Law (1596)
- Essays (1st ed., 1597)
- The Colours of Good and Evil (1597)
- Meditationes Sacrae (1597)
- Declaration of the Practices and Treasons attempted and Committed by the late Earl of Essex (1601)
- Valerius Terminus of the Interpretation of Nature (1603)
- A Brief Discourse touching the Happy Union of the Kingdoms of England and Scotland (1603)
- Cogitations de Natura Rerum ('Thoughts on the Nature of Things', 1604)
- Apologie concerning the late Earl of Essex (1604)
- Certain Considerations touching the better pacification and Edification of the Church of England (1604)
- The Advancement of Learning of the Proficience and Advancement of Learning, Divine and Human (1605)
- Temporis Partus Masculus ('The Masculine Birth of Time', 1605)
- Filum Labyrinthi sive Formula Inquisitionis (1606)
- In Felicem Memoriam Elizabethae ('In Happy Memory of Queen Elizabeth', (1606)
- Cogitata et Visa de Interpretatione Naturae ('Thoughts and Conclusions on the Interpretation of Nature', 1607)
- Redargiutio Philosophiarum ('The Refutation of Philosophies') (1608)
- The Plantation of Ireland (1608–9)
- De Sapientia Veterum ('Wisdom of the Ancients', 1609)
- Descriptio Globi Intellectualis ('A Description of the Intellectual Globe') (1612)
- Thema Coeli ('Theory of the Heavens', 1612)
- Essays (2nd edition – 38 essays, 1612)
- Charge… touching Duels (1614)
- The Masque of Flowers (performed by Gray's Inn before the King at Whitehall to honour the marriage of the Earl of Somerset to Frances Howard, Countess of Essex, 1614)
- Instauratio Magna ('Great Instauration', 1620)
- Novum Organum ('New Method', 1620)
- Historia Naturalis ('Natural History', 1622)
- Introduction to six Natural Histories (1622)
- Historia Ventorum ('History of Winds', 1622)
- History of the Reign of King Henry VII (1622)
- Abcedarium Naturae (1622)
- De Augmentis Scientiarum (1623)
- Historia Vitae et Mortis ('History of Life and Death', 1623)
- Historia Densi et Rari ('History of Density and Rarity', 1623)
- Historia Gravis et Levis ('History of Gravity and Levity', 1623)
- History of the Sympathy and Antipathy of Things (1623)
- History of Sulphur, Salt and Mercury (1623)
- A Discourse of a War with Spain (1623)
- An Advertisement touching an Holy War (1623)
- A Digest of the Laws of England (1623)
- Cogitationes de Natura Rerum ('Thoughts on the Nature of Things', 1624)
- De Fluxu et Refluxu Maris ('Of the Ebb and Flow of the Sea', 1624)
- Essays, or Counsels Civil and Moral (3rd/final edition – 58 essays, 1625)
- Apophthegms New and Old (1625)
- Translation of Certain Psalms into English Verse (1625)
- Revision of De Sapientia Veterum ('Wisdom of the Ancients', 1625)
- Inquisitio de Magnete ('Enquiries into Magnetism', 1625)
- Topica Inquisitionis de Luce et Lumine ('Topical Inquisitions into Light and Luminosity', 1625)

== Posthumous ==
- New Atlantis (1626)
- Sylva Sylvarum, or a Natural History in Ten Centuries (1626)
- Certain Miscellany Works (1629)
- Use of the Law (1629)
- Elements of the Common Laws (1629)
- Operum Moralium et Civilium (1638)
- Dialogus de Bello Sacro (1638)
- Cases of Treason (1641)
- Confession of Faith (1641)
- Speech concerning Naturalisation (1641)
- Office of Constables (1641)
- Discourse concerning Church Affairs (1641)
- An Essay of a King (1642)
- The Learned Reading of Sir Francis Bacon (to Gray's Inn) (1642)
- Ordinances (1642)
- Relation of the Poisoning of Overbury. (1651)
- Scripta in Naturali et Universali Philosophia (1653)
- Scala Intellectus sive Filum Labyrinthi (1653)
- Prodromi sive Anticipationes Philosophiae Secundae (1653)
- Cogitationes de Natura Rerum (1653)
- De Fluxu et Refluxu Maris (1653)
- The Mirror of State and Eloquence (1656)
- Opuscula Varia Posthuma, Philosophica, Civilia et Theologia (1658)
- Letter of Advice to the Duke of Buckingham (1661)
- Charge given for the Verge (1662)
- Baconiana, Or Certain Genuine Remains Of Sr. Francis Bacon (1679)
- Abcedarium Naturae, or a Metaphysical piece (1679)
- Letters and Remains (1734)
- Promus (1861)

== See also ==
- Works by Francis Bacon
