= David St John Thomas =

British publisher (1929–2014)

David St John Thomas (30 August 1929 – 19 August 2014) was an English publisher and writer who founded David & Charles.

== Early life and career ==
The son of writer Gilbert Thomas (1891–1978) he shared his father's enthusiasm for railways, particularly in the running of their Bassett-Lowke model railway.

Brought up in Devon over the World War II period, his first job was as a reporter on the Western Morning News in Plymouth where he specialised in covering transport and holiday stories. He later became a freelancer, combining journalism and radio and television reporting with fruit farming and being commissioned by the Dartington Hall Trust and others to produce reports on rural transport. His first book (for young people) was published in 1959 and in 1960 he produced the first book in the series he was to edit (and later publish), A Regional History of the Railways of Great Britain, The West Country.

== Foundation of David and Charles ==
On 1 April 1960 he founded, with canal writer Charles Hadfield, the non-fiction publishing house of David & Charles of which he became chairman. This was run from his house at Ipplepen before moving to its better-known address at Newton Abbot railway station. With a staff of up to 300 the firm ran Britain's second-largest book club group, Readers' Union, which had a score of specialised clubs totalling about 250,000 members.

In later years, he also published some books under his own imprint. He continued to write himself, including a series of well-illustrated books on railway topics with Patrick B. Whitehouse and others, and more books on travel-related topics. He was keen to encourage new writers, and to this end launched the magazine Writers’ News in 1989, since sold.

== The David St John Thomas Charitable Trust ==
Having sold David & Charles, to F+W Media in 2000, and moved to Nairn, Scotland, he set up the David St John Thomas Charitable Trust. It makes awards to writers and also to gap year students.

== Death ==
Thomas died in his sleep on 19 August 2014 at the age of 84 while on a cruise in the Baltic.
