= Birmingham and Staffordshire Gas Light Company =

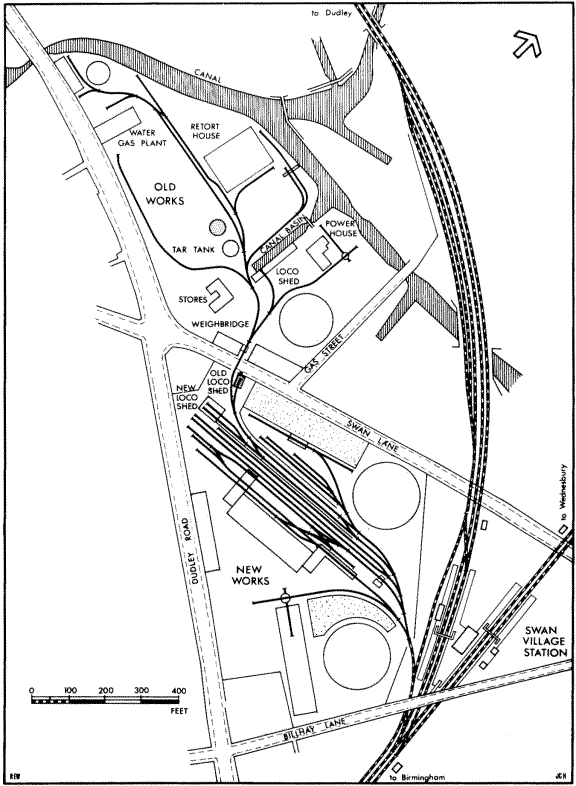
A map of the Swan Village Gas Works.

The Birmingham and Staffordshire Gas Light Company operated in Birmingham and Staffordshire from 1825 to 1875.

== History ==
In 1825, the Birmingham and Staffordshire Gas Light Company was founded by an act of Parliament, the Birmingham Gas Act 1825 (6 Geo. 4. c. lxxix), to manufacture and supply gas to Birmingham and a number of surrounding towns, including West Bromwich; the lighting of the main road through the town was also mentioned in the act.

The Swan Village Gas Works were the first part of the complex to be constructed, and when completed in 1829 were the largest in the country.

In 1874, the Mayor of Birmingham, Joseph Chamberlain, lead the Council to buy out the company. An act of Parliament, the Birmingham (Corporation) Gas Act 1875 (38 & 39 Vict. c. clxxviii), was obtained in July 1875 and the Birmingham Corporation Gas Committee was set up.
