= Charles Hadfield (historian) =

Ellis Charles Raymond Hadfield
- Born: 5 August 1909; Pietersburg, South Africa
- Died: 6 August 1996 (aged 87)
- Occupation: Historian
- Writing career
- Subject: Canals

Ellis Charles Raymond Hadfield (5 August 1909 – 6 August 1996) was a canal historian and the author of many classic works on the British canal system, mostly published by the firm he co-founded, David & Charles.

== Biography ==
Charles Hadfield was born at Pietersburg, South Africa, where his New Zealand-born father was an Assistant Resident Magistrate; his mother was daughter of a Devon clergyman. Hadfield went to England in 1924 to be educated at Blundell's School, Devon, after which he went up to St Edmund Hall, Oxford. In 1936 he joined the Oxford University Press. He was invited to the home of the theatre critic and author Robert Aickman in May 1946, as were the author L Tom C Rolt and four others, the outcome of which was the formation of the Inland Waterways Association (IWA), a pressure group for the preservation and restoration of the waterways, with Aickman as chairman, Hadfield as vice-chairman and Rolt as secretary. In 1950 books about the waterways started to appear, to inform the public about their plight, with Rolt producing The Inland Waterways of England, Aickman producing Know your Waterways, and Hadfield producing Introducing Canals. Later the same year, his book British Canals appeared, which ultimately was expanded into a comprehensive series of books about canals throughout Great Britain.

Hadfield parted company with the IWA in 1951, after he, Rolt and others signed a memorandum suggesting that the organisation needed to have a policy of "priorities". This did not sit well with Aickman, who felt that all waterways should be retained and rule changes were introduced to force their exclusion. Hadfield recalled:

...a serious upset occurred in the Association: some original members were expelled and independent canal societies founded. The Association itself chose a protest role as a pressure group which had some success in preventing possible abandonments, but for a time kept it out of a constructive part in decision-making or co-operation with the Commission.

In 1946 he became the director of publications at the Central Office of Information. He was a founder member of the Railway and Canal Historical Society in 1954 and in 1960 he joined his friend David St John Thomas in setting up the publishing company David & Charles and continued publishing a stream of canal books. This extended to a study of world canals, amassing a rich store of research material now kept at the National Waterways Museum, Ellesmere Port.

Between 1963 and 1966 he was a member of the British Waterways Board. He resigned from the management of the publishing firm in 1964 but continued to edit The Canals of the British Isles series. In 1971 he was invited to rejoin the IWA and became a vice-president in 1983.

He married Alice Mary Miller in 1945 who died seven years before him in 1989 and they had two sons (Henry, who died an infant and Alexander who died in 2011) and a daughter (Molly). Hadfield had been appointed CMG in 1954.

== Bibliography ==
=== Canals ===
- Hadfield, Charles; Eyre, Frank (1947). English Rivers and Canals (First ed.). Collins. p. 47.
- Hadfield, Charles (1950). Introducing Canals (First ed.).
- Hadfield, Charles (1950). British Canals. An Illustrated History (First ed.). Phoenix House. 2nd edn 1959, (Phoenix House). 3rd edn 1966 (David & Charles), 4th edition 1969, 5th edn 1974, 6th edn 1979, 7th edn 1984 ISBN 0-7153-8568-2
- Hadfield, Charles (1955). The Canals of Southern England (First ed.). Phoenix House.
- Hadfield, Charles (1960). The Canals of South Wales and the Border (First ed.). University of Wales Press. 2nd edn 1967 ISBN 0-7153-4027-1 (David & Charles)
- Hadfield, Charles (1966). The Canals of the East Midlands (including part of London) (First ed.). David & Charles. 2nd edn 1970 ISBN 0-7153-4871-X
- Hadfield, Charles (1966). The Canals of the West Midlands (First ed.). David & Charles. 2nd edn 1969, 3rd edn 1985 ISBN 0-7153-8644-1
- Hadfield, Charles (1967). Atmospheric Railways (First ed.). David & Charles. ISBN 0-7153-4107-3.
- Hadfield, Charles (1967). The Canals of South West England (First ed.). David & Charles. ISBN 0-7153-4176-6. 2nd edn 1970. ISBN 0-7153-8079-6
- Hadfield, Charles (1968). The Canal Age (First ed.). David & Charles. 2nd edn 1981 ISBN 0-7153-8079-6
- Hadfield, Charles (1969). The Canals of South and South East England (First ed.). David & Charles. ISBN 0-7153-4693-8.
- Hadfield, Charles; Biddle, Gordon (1970). The Canals of North West England Volume 1 (First ed.). David & Charles. ISBN 0-7153-4956-2.
- Hadfield, Charles; Biddle, Gordon (1970). The Canals of North West England Volume 2 (First ed.). David & Charles. ISBN 0-7153-4992-9.
- Hadfield, Charles (1972). The Canals of Yorkshire and North East England Volume 1 (First ed.). David & Charles. ISBN 0-7153-5719-0.
- Hadfield, Charles (1973). The Canals of Yorkshire and North East England Volume 2 (First ed.). David & Charles. ISBN 0-7153-5975-4.
- Hadfield, Charles (1978). Inland Waterways (First ed.). David & Charles. ISBN 0-7153-7502-4.
- Hadfield, Charles; Skempton, A W (1979). William Jessop, engineer (First ed.). David & Charles. ISBN 0-7153-7603-9.
- Hadfield, Charles (1986). World Canals (First ed.). David & Charles. ISBN 0-7153-8555-0.
- Hadfield, Charles (1993). Thomas Telford's Temptation (First ed.). M & M Baldwin. ISBN 0-947712-19-4.

=== Other works ===
- The Cotswolds. Batsford, London, 1966. (With Alice Mary Hadfield)
- The Cotswolds: A new study. David & Charles, 1973. (With Alice Mary Hadfield) ISBN 0715362240
- Introducing the Cotswolds. David & Charles, 1976. (With Alice Mary Hadfield) ISBN 071537169X
- Afloat in America: Two enthusiasts explore the United States and Canada by waterway and rail. David & Charles, Newton Abbot, 1979. (With Alice Mary Hadfield) ISBN 0715379100

== See also ==
- Canals of the United Kingdom
- History of the British canal system

== Bibliography ==
- Squires, Roger (2008), Britain's Restored Canals (2nd ed.), Landmark, ISBN 978-1-84306-331-5.
