= Augustus M. Kelley =

New York based publishing house

Augustus M. Kelley, Publishing was a New York-based publishing house named after its founder, Augustus M. Kelley (1913–1999). The exact dates of operation of the firm are not known. The concern primarily published non-fiction works and was noted for facsimile reprints of older books. Many of their books dealt with economic history and theory.

== History ==
The firm was most active in the 1960s and 1970s, when it was located in New York City. By 1986, the firm had moved to Fairfield, New Jersey, where it appears to have remained.

In the 1960s and 1970s, Augustus M. Kelley was the American publisher for books brought out in Great Britain by David & Charles. David & Charles took out advertisements on the back page of The Railway Magazine; the first of these to mention Augustus M. Kelley was the September 1968 issue. That advertisement announced: "In America almost all D&C railway, canal and industrial archaeology titles are published by Augustus M. Kelley Publishers, 24 East 22nd Street, New York, NY 10010".

== Examples of publications ==
- Brindley at Wet Earth Colliery by A. G. Banks and R. B. Schofield. A David & Charles book, 1968.
- The Life of Mr. Thomas Betterton by Charles Gildon. Originally published in 1710. Reprinted by Augustus M. Kelley, Publishers, in 1970.
