= Essays (Francis Bacon) =

1597 book by Francis Bacon

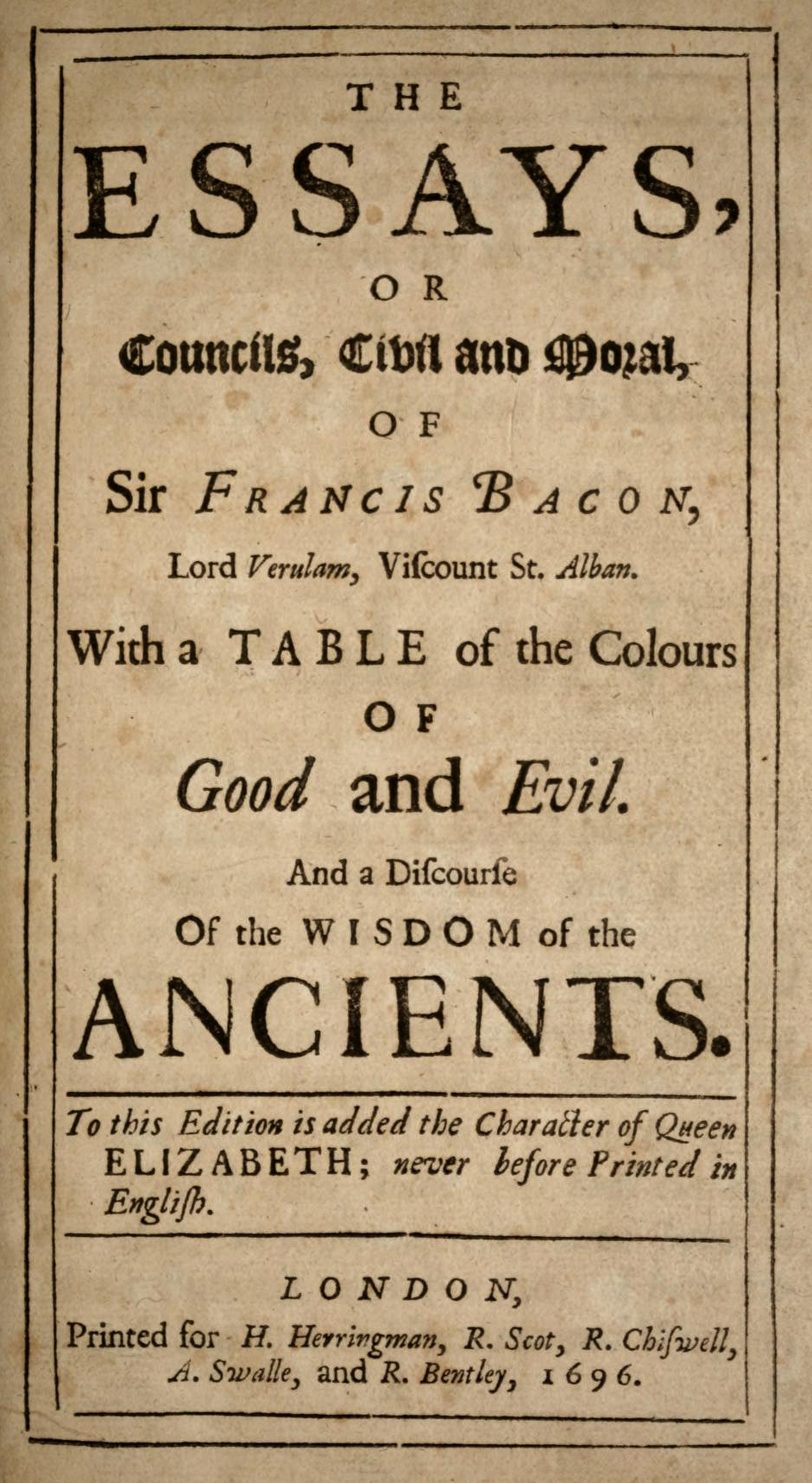
1696 title page

Essayes: Religious Meditations. Places of Perswasion and Disswasion. Seene and Allowed (1597) was the first published book by the philosopher, statesman and jurist Francis Bacon. The Essays are written in a wide range of styles, from the plain and unadorned to the epigrammatic. They cover topics drawn from both public and private life, and in each case the essays cover their topics systematically from a number of different angles, weighing one argument against another. While the original edition included 10 essays, a much-enlarged second edition appeared in 1612 with 38. Another, under the title Essayes or Counsels, Civill and Morall, was published in 1625 with 58 essays. Translations into French and Italian appeared during Bacon's lifetime. In Bacon's essay "Of Plantations", published in 1625, he relates planting colonies to war. He states that such plantations should be governed by those with a commission or authority to exercise martial law.

== Critical reception ==
Though Bacon considered the Essays "but as recreation of my other studies", he was given high praise by his contemporaries, even to the point of crediting him with having invented the essay form. Later researches made clear the extent of Bacon's borrowings from the works of Montaigne, Aristotle and other writers, but the Essays have nevertheless remained in the highest repute. The 19th-century literary historian Henry Hallam wrote that "They are deeper and more discriminating than any earlier, or almost any later, work in the English language".

The Essays stimulated Richard Whately to republish them with extensive annotations that Whately extrapolated from the originals.

== Aphorisms ==
Bacon's genius as a phrase-maker appears to great advantage in the later essays. In Of Boldness he wrote, "If the Hill will not come to Mahomet, Mahomet will go to the hill", which is the earliest known appearance of that proverb in print. The phrase "hostages to fortune" appears in the essay Of Marriage and Single Life – again the earliest known usage. Aldous Huxley's book Jesting Pilate took its epigraph, "What is Truth? said jesting Pilate; and would not stay for an answer", from Bacon's essay Of Truth. The 1999 edition of The Oxford Dictionary of Quotations includes no fewer than 91 quotations from the Essays.

== Contents listing ==
The contents pages of Thomas Markby's 1853 edition list the essays and their dates of publication as follows:

- Of Truth (1625)
- Of Death (1612, enlarged 1625)
- Of Unity in Religion/Of Religion (1612, rewritten 1625)
- Of Revenge (1625)
- Of Adversity (1625)
- Of Simulation and Dissimulation (1625)
- Of Parents and Children (1612, enlarged 1625)
- Of Marriage and Single Life (1612, slightly enlarged 1625)
- Of Envy (1625)
- Of Love (1612, rewritten 1625)
- Of Great Place (1612, slightly enlarged 1625)
- Of Boldness (1625)
- Of Goodness and Goodness of Nature (1612, enlarged 1625)
- Of Nobility (1612, rewritten 1625)
- Of Seditions and Troubles (1625)
- Of Atheism (1612, slightly enlarged 1625)
- Of Superstition (1612, slightly enlarged 1625)
- Of Travel (1625)
- Of Empire (1612, much enlarged 1625)
- Of Counsels (1612, enlarged 1625)
- Of Delays (1625)
- Of Cunning (1612, rewritten 1625)
- Of Wisdom for a Man's Self (1612, enlarged 1625)
- Of Innovations (1625)
- Of Dispatch (1612)
- Of Seeming Wise (1612)
- Of Friendship (1612, rewritten 1625)
- Of Expense (1597, enlarged 1612, again 1625)
- Of the True Greatness of Kingdoms and Estates (1612, enlarged 1625)
- Of Regiment of Health (1597, enlarged 1612, again 1625)
- Of Suspicion (1625)
- Of Discourse (1597, slightly enlarged 1612, again 1625)
- Of Plantations (1625)
- Of Riches (1612, much enlarged 1625)
- Of Prophecies (1625)
- Of Ambition (1612, enlarged 1625)
- Of Masques and Triumphs (1625)
- Of Nature in Men (1612, enlarged 1625)
- Of Custom and Education (1612, enlarged 1625)
- Of Fortune (1612, slightly enlarged 1625)
- Of Usury (1625)
- Of Youth and Age (1612, slightly enlarged 1625)
- Of Beauty (1612, slightly enlarged 1625)
- Of Deformity (1612, somewhat altered 1625)
- Of Building (1625)
- Of Gardens (1625)
- Of Negotiating (1597, enlarged 1612, very slightly altered 1625)
- Of Followers and Friends (1597, slightly enlarged 1625)
- Of Suitors (1597, enlarged 1625)
- Of Studies (1597, enlarged 1625)
- Of Faction (1597, much enlarged 1625)
- Of Ceremonies and Respects (1597, enlarged 1625)
- Of Praise (1612, enlarged 1625)
- Of Vain Glory (1612)
- Of Honour and Reputation (1597, omitted 1612, republished 1625)
- Of Judicature (1612)
- Of Anger (1625)
- Of Vicissitude of Things (1625)
- A Fragment of an Essay of Fame
- Of the Colours of Good and Evil

== Recent editions ==
- Michael J. Hawkins (ed.) Essays (London: J. M. Dent, 1973). No. 1010 in Everyman's Library.
- Michael Kiernan (ed.) The Essayes or Counsels, Civill and Morall (Oxford: Clarendon Press, 1985). Vol. 15 of The Oxford Francis Bacon.
- John Pitcher (ed.) The Essays (Harmondsworth: Penguin, 1985). In the Penguin Classics series. ISBN 9780140432169.
- Brian Vickers (ed.) The Essays or Counsels, Civil and Moral (New York: Oxford University Press). In the Oxford World's Classics series.

== See also ==
- Essays (Montaigne)
