= Ridgacre Branch =

UK canal

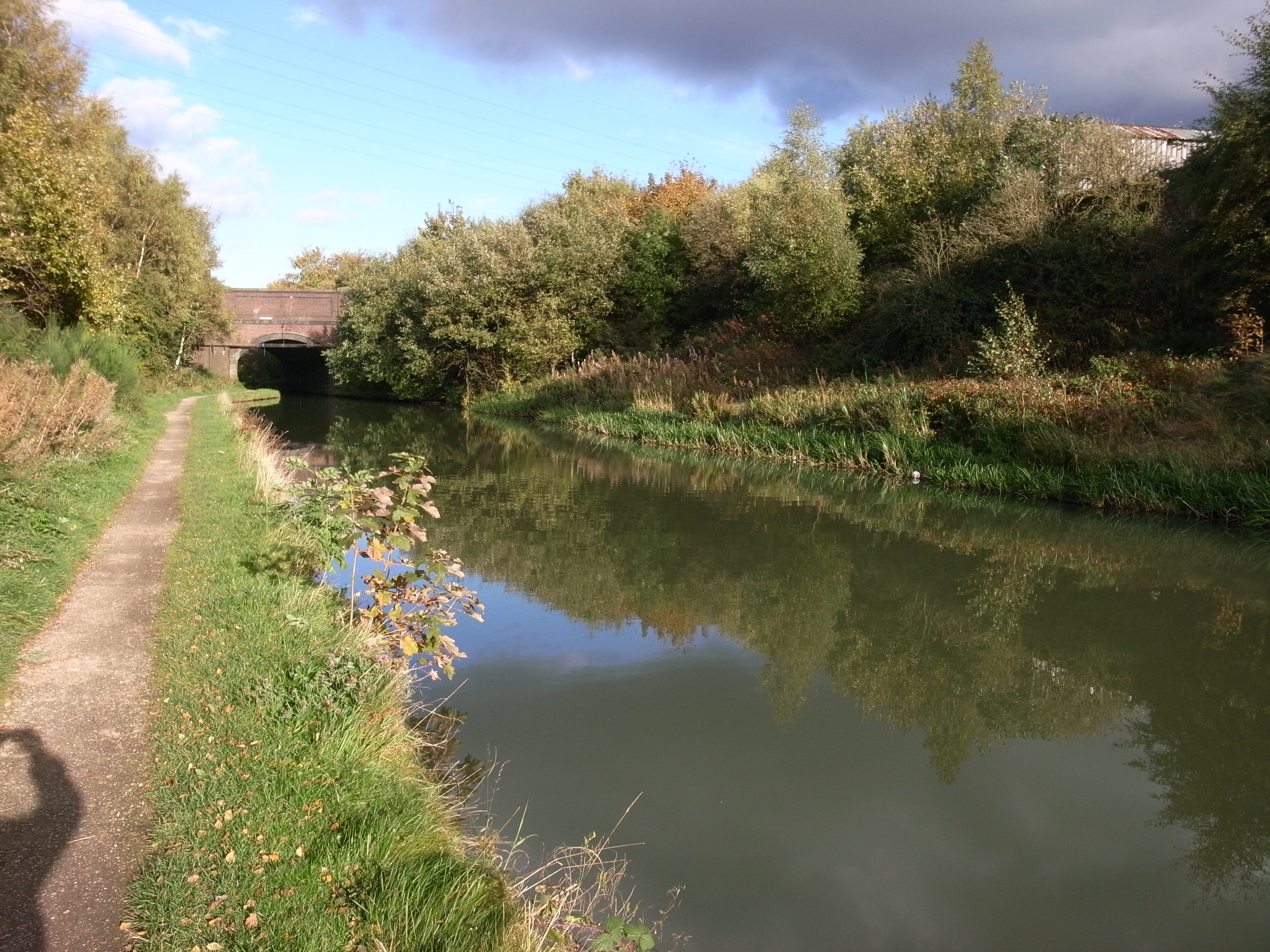
- An almost rural view near Black Lake road bridge

Specifications
- Length: 0.75 miles (1.21 km)
- Status: watered but disconnected

History
- Date completed: 1828
- Date closed: 1960s

Geography
- Start point: Swan Bridge Junction
- End point: Hateley Heath
- Connects to: Wednesbury Old Canal

Map of Ridgacre Branch and the original Wednesbury Canal (outlined yellow) and its modern neighbours. Wednesbury Old Canal as it stands today is shown in pink/yellow.

The Ridgacre Branch is a canal branch of the Wednesbury Old Canal, part of the Birmingham Canal Navigations, in the West Midlands, England. It opened in 1828, to serve collieries and iron works, and was disused by the 1960s. Except for its branches and a small section at the eastern end, which have been filled in, most of it is still in water, but it is not navigable as a low-level bridge carrying the Black Country New Road spans the entrance.

== History ==
The Wednesbury Old Canal was the first part of the Birmingham Canal to be opened. It was authorised by Act of Parliament in 1768, as a branch to the main line between Birmingham and Wolverhampton, but because there were coal mines at Balls Hill, the branch and the route into Birmingham were built, to tap into the lucrative coal trade. It opened in 1769, with the main line to Wolverhampton opening three years later. The Birmingham Canal formed the backbone of the Birmingham Canal Navigations system as the network expanded.

The Ridgacre Branch was one of the many which the Birmingham Canal Navigations opened to generate trade. It was 0.75 miles (1.2 km) in length, and opened in 1826, running from the Wednesbury Canal at Swan Bridge Junction, just to the north of the modern New Swan Lane / Black Country New Road roundabout, in a north easterly direction to a basin and coal mines near Hateley Heath. As mining expanded, so additional branches were added. The Dartmouth Branch ran northwards for about 0.6 miles (0.97 km) and opened in 1828, as did the Halford Branch, which initially headed south then east and finally north. It was around 0.5 miles (0.80 km) ling, and tramways linked the terminal basin to the Hall End Colliery. The Jesson Branch was connected to the Halford Branch, and was named after the owner of the mines which it served. It was 0.12 miles (0.19 km) long and opened in 1831.

The canal and its branches were closed down following the Second World War. Parts of the Dartmouth and Halford Branches were closed in 1947, and as a result of the British Transport Commission Act 1954 (2 & 3 Eliz. 2. c. lv), the Jesson Branch was closed, as were parts of the Wednesbury Canal to the north of its junction with the Ridgacre Branch, with more closing following the British Transport Commission Act 1960 (8 & 9 Eliz. 2. c. xlvii).

When plans were drawn up for the Black Country Spine Road in 1992, they included the provision of a navigable culvert under the road near the Swan Bridge roundabout, with headroom of 8.2 feet (2.5 m). The existing junction with the turning head for the Balls Hill Branch would have been closed and a new entrance created slightly further to the east, with a new towpath bridge over the entrance. However, when it was built, the canal was culverted under the bridge, so the Ridgacre has been cut off from the canal network. It is in water for nearly all of its original length, although its branches have gone.

== Route ==
Some modern sources, such as Nicholson, mark the Ridgacre as starting at Ryder's Green Junction, but historically, the Wednesbury Old Canal continued to Swan Bridge Junction, where the Ridgacre Branch began. The Wednesbury Canal continued on to the Balls Hill Collieries, and was often called the Balls Hill Branch beyond the junction. The Wednesbury Canal arrived at the junction from the south west, and the Ridgeacre headed east. There was a large gas works on the south bank, while to the north, the Wednesbury Canal entered a wider section, with a short basin to the east and a longer one to the west, flanked by railway sidings. The canal passed under the Great Western Railway Great Bridge Branch on its way to Balls Hill. The wider section and the western basin remain in water, although the junction is beneath the modern roundabout of the Black Country Spine Road.

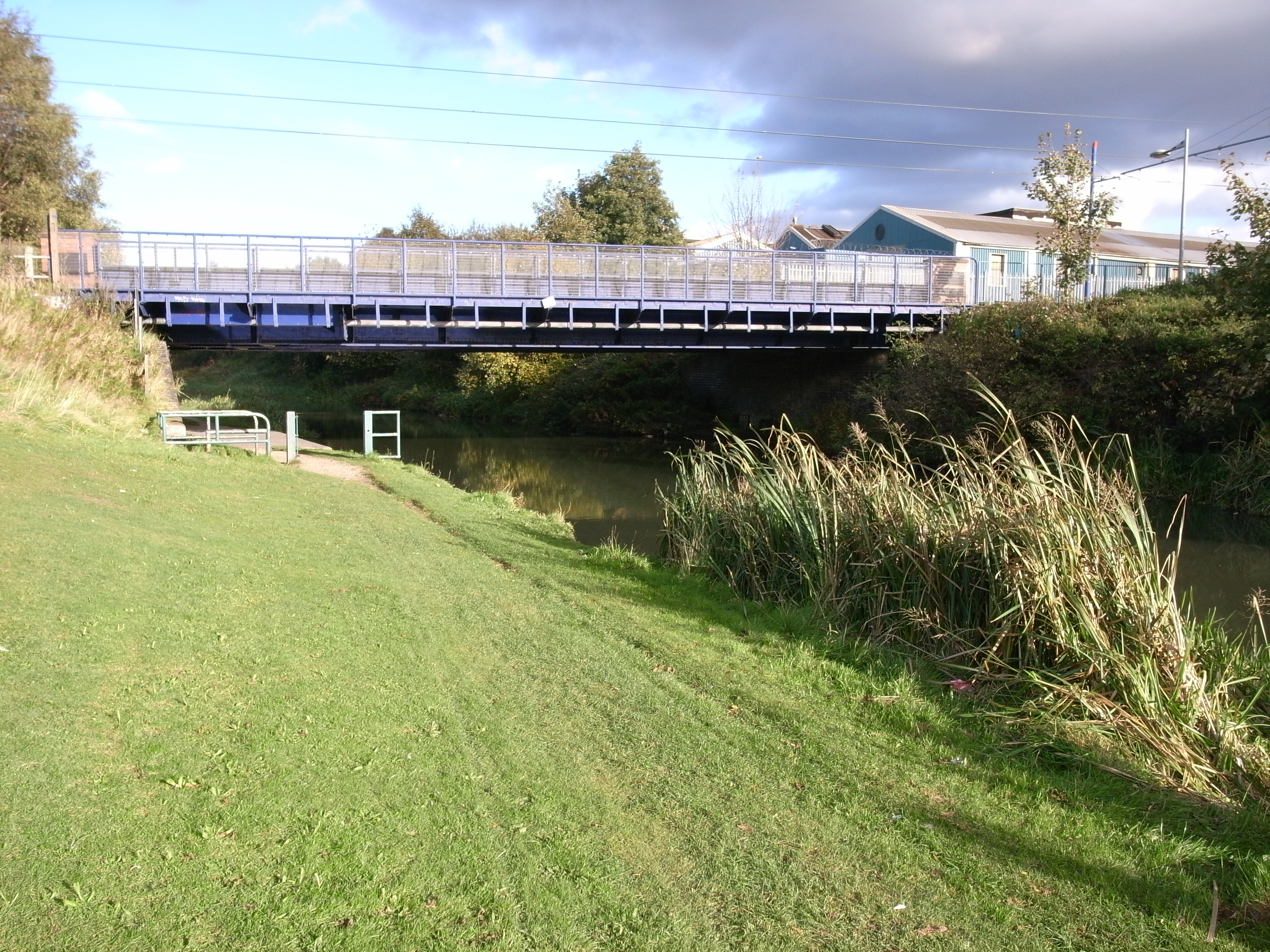
The West Midlands Metro bridge at Black Lake

On the Ridgacre Branch, a basin to the south, crossed by a footbridge, served the gasworks. Gas Street crossed to the east of the gasworks on Sandy Gay Bridge, and there was another basin just after the bridge, which served Swan Meadow Swa Mills. Both were still evident in 1938, but by 1966 the basin had been reduced to a tiny stub. Next came a railway bridge carrying the Great Bridge Branch over the canal. A tramway from the Blacklake Colliery crossed the canal in 1890, to reach Blacklake Wharf on the south bank of the canal, but the colliery was marked as disused in 1904, and the tramway had been lifted. By 1966, most of the wharf had gone, but the area was still used as a coal yard. The next bridge was for the Birmingham, Wolverhampton and Dudley Railway, which has since been re-used for the West Midlands Metro tramway system.

Blacklake Bridge carried Blacklake Lane, now the A4196, over the canal to the east of White's Farm Colliery, where there was another basin. Open in 1890, it was disused in 1904, by which time an electricity generating station had been built on the southern part of the site. The basin had gone by 1920. On the north bank, opposite the basin entrance, the Dartmouth Branch began. It headed due north, passing under Coles Lane Bridge and Hatchey Heath Bridge. Between the bridges there were two basins to the east in 1890 and one to the west, above which was Albert Street Ironworks. By 1904, the western basin had gone, but a tramway connected the works to the canal. Housing had covered the area to the east of the canal by 1938. Hatchey Heath Bridge carried Witton Lane, and beyond it, Witton Lane Colliery lay to the west, while a tramway connected the terminal basin to Crookhay Colliery to the north-east. Balls Hill Colliery lay a little further to the west, on the other side of Crookhay Lane. Coles Lane, Witton Lane and Crookhay Lane still follow approximately their old routes, but modern housing has destroyed most traces of the historical landscape.

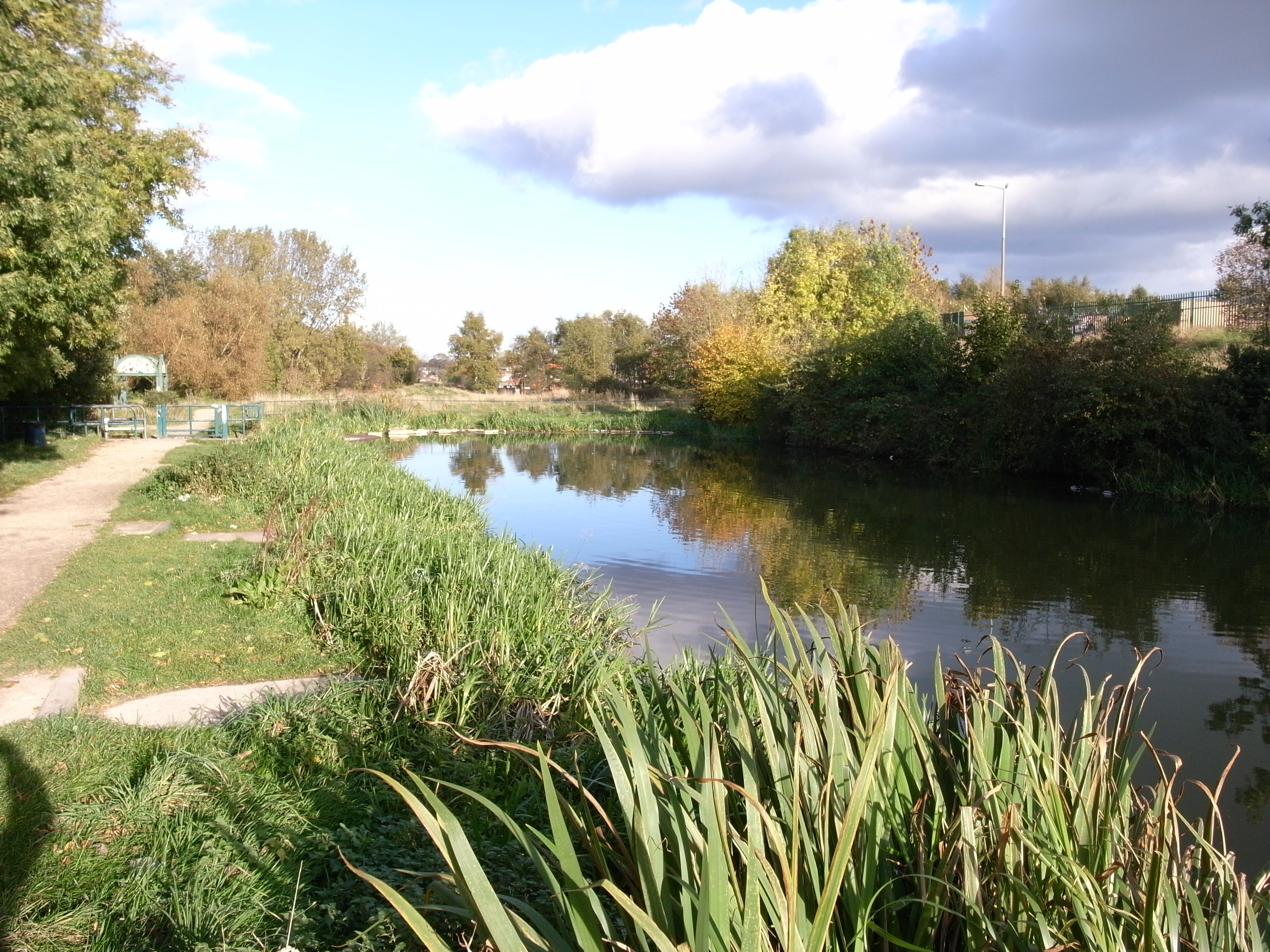
The modern terminus, overlooking Hateley Heath

Returning to the Ridgace Canal, it continued for a little way past the junction and terminated at a basin. Coppice Colliery lay to the north, and Coppice Colliery Bridge crossed the channel to the west of the basin, but the colliery was already disused by 1890. The colliery bridge is the eastern limit of the modern watered section. A stream crossed the area near the waste tips, and fed the canal through a sluice. Between the bridge and the basin, the Halford Branch turned off and headed south. On its east bank were the Ridgacre Oil Works, the Cyclops Iron Works, the Waterloo Iron Works and the Hall End Iron Works. Ridgacre Iron Works was on the west bank. By 1904, the oil works had become the Hall End Chemical Works, and the Cyclops Works was processing soap and tallow.

Church Lane crossed the canal at Ridgacre Bridge, beyond which the Jesson Branch continued to the south, while the Halford Branch turned to the east. Jesson Bridge crossed the entrance to the Jesson Branch, which was bordered by an iron work and Ridgacre Tube Works to the west and the workings of a disused colliery to the east in 1890. By 1904, the iron works was a rolling mill, and the tube works had become the Acme Iron Foundry. The Oriental Tube Works had been built on the north bank of the next section of the Halford Branch by 1904, and a wharf served the Hall End Brick Works, where the canal turned to the north to pass under Church Lane again, at Church Lane Bridge. There was a large basin beyond the bridge, in 1890, connected by tramways to workings to the east and to Hall End Colliery to the north. The canal appears to terminate before the bridge by 1904, and the colliery buildings and tramways have gone. By 1966, the brickworks and the Jesson Branch had both gone.

== Points of Interest ==
Point	Coordinates (Links to map resources)	OS Grid Ref	Notes
Swan Bridge Junction	52.5293°N 2.0165°W	SO988924	Wednesbury Old Canal (junction culverted)
Ridgacre Branch Swan Bridge Junction culvert	52.5293°N 2.0162°W	SO989924	
Ridgacre Branch New Gas Street bridge (culvert)	52.5294°N 2.0145°W	SO990924	
Ridgacre Branch West Midlands Metro (was GWR)	52.5300°N 2.0107°W	SO992924	
Ridgacre Branch Black Lake bridge	52.5310°N 2.0084°W	SO994926	
Halford Branch Junction	52.5344°N 2.0023°W	SO998929	(estimated)
Jesson Branch Junction	52.5309°N 1.9999°W	SP000925	(estimated)
Jesson Branch	52.5296°N 2.0006°W	SP000925	(estimated)
Halford Branch terminus	52.5319°N 1.9955°W	SP003927	(estimated)
Ridgacre Branch end of water	52.5341°N 2.0030°W	SO997929	
Ridgacre Branch terminus	52.5350°N 1.9997°W	SP000930	(estimated)
Dartmouth Branch Junction	52.5333°N 2.0048°W	SO996928	(estimated)
Dartmouth Branch	52.5387°N 2.0055°W	SO996934	(estimated) (site of Coles Lane bridge)
Dartmouth Branch terminus	52.5419°N 2.0066°W	SO995938	(estimated)

== See also ==
- Canals of the United Kingdom
- History of the British canal system

== Bibliography ==
- Broadbridge, S. R. (1974). The Birmingham Canal Navigations, Vol. 1 1768 - 1846. David & Charles. ISBN 978-0-7509-2077-3.
- Dean, Richard (1989). Historical Map of the Birmingham Canals. M. & M. Baldwin. ISBN 978-0-947712-08-2.
- Hadfield, Charles (1985). Canals of the West Midlands. Newton Abbott: David & Charles. ISBN 978-0-7153-8644-6.
- Nicholson (2003). Nicholson Guide Vol 3 - Birmingham & the Heart of England. Harper Collins. ISBN 978-0-00-713666-7.
- Ordnance Survey Six Inch Series (1:10,560), Map SO99SE, 1955
