= David & Charles =

British book publisher

- Status: Active
- Founded: 1 April 1960
- Founder: David St John Thomas; Charles Hadfield
- Headquarters location: Exeter, England
- Distribution: Macmillan (MDL) Distribution (UK); Ingram Content Group (North America)
- Publication types: Book, E-book
- Nonfiction topics: craft, art, wellbeing, automotive
- Imprints: David & Charles, Verbena, Veloce
- Revenue: £5 million (2021)
- Official website: davidandcharles.com

David & Charles Ltd is an independent publishing company that publishes hobby and interest books under the imprints David & Charles, Verbena and Veloce. The company was originally founded in 1960 by David St John Thomas and Charles Hadfield. It is based in Exeter, England.

== History ==
David and Charles was founded in Newton Abbot, England, on 1 April 1960 by David St John Thomas and Charles Hadfield. It made its name publishing titles on Britain's canals and railways. The company's first employees worked from a hut in David St John Thomas' garden. As the business expanded the company relocated to the Newton Abbot railway station building, eventually taking over the locomotive shed for use as a warehouse.

From 1965 to 1970 David & Charles had an extensive list of books published with the American imprint Augustus M. Kelley. These books were usually almost identical to the United Kingdom product but with changed dust jacket and publisher's information.

In 1971, the company bought Readers' Union, a group of book clubs catering to enthusiasts of needlecraft, handicrafts, gardening, equestrian pursuits and photography. The company's publishing programme began to reflect these subject areas, moving away from the traditional transport titles for which it had become known. Membership of the Readers' Union book clubs peaked at 268,000 members in 1992, making it "the largest privately-owned book club operation in the English-speaking world".

The company was sold to Reader's Digest in 1990 before a subsequent management buy-out in 1997. In 2000, the company was bought by American company F+W Publications, which later became F+W Media. The growth of internet retailing led to the closure of the Readers' Union book clubs in 2008, which were replaced with the ecommerce business RUCraft. RUCraft rebranded to become Stitch Craft Create in January 2013.

The company was rebranded to become F&W Media International in 2010. It continued to publish new books under the David and Charles imprint, focusing entirely on craft and lifestyle categories. In October 2013, the company launched a UK ecommerce site in partnership with Burda Style. In November 2015, the company moved from Newton Abbot to Pynes Hill in Exeter and completed the acquisition of the online ecommerce business SewandSo.co.uk.

In March 2019, F+W Media announced entered Chapter 11 Bankruptcy proceedings. The book publishing assets of F&W Media International were acquired in a Management Buy-Out led by managing director, James Woollam. A new company was formed in July 2019 to complete the buy-out and was able to return to the David & Charles name.

David and Charles acquired the Veloce imprint in February 2024. With an over 30-year history of publishing into the automotive categories, Veloce has an extensive backlist and reputation for expertise in the motoring and classic car market. Veloce founder and former owner Rod Grainger has been providing new book consultancy support since the acquisition and has handed over to Kizzy Taylor-Richelieu who took the position of Senior Commissioning Editor for the Veloce imprint in October 2024.

In 2025, David & Charles launched a new imprint, Verbena Books. Verbena debuted in January 2025 with a diverse range of titles from renowned authors. The initial lineup included titles like: Shadow Work for the Soul Searcher by Polly Pollock, Hormone Goddess by Samantha Hadadi, Maiden, Warrior, Mother, Crone by Julie Peters, and The Witch-ionary by Deb Robinson.

Verbena’s mission is to provide readers with practical advice, inspiring stories, and expert guidance on a wide range of topics, including mindfulness, meditation, witchcraft, magic, lifestyle, wellbeing, and nature. These topics build on the success of other David & Charles titles like 100 Plants that Heal, Mood Crystals, and The Witch’s Yearbook.

=== Early publishing ===
Among the early titles were The Canals of the British Isles series, edited and often written by Hadfield – he wrote in full or part, at least five of the volumes. Another series was the A Regional History of the Railways of Great Britain (15 volumes); with the first volume written by St John Thomas and which led to the publishing of two companion series: Forgotten Railways and Railway History in Pictures. The Scottish writer John Thomas wrote a series of books on Scotland railway lines and railway companies, first published in the 1960s and 1970s by the company.

John Marshall was another railway historian published by the company. The company also published travel and topographical works from the 1960s through to the 1990s of which The Islands Series and the Light and the Land books by Colin Baxter were the most prominent examples. One of their 1968 titles was a new edition of E. Temple Thurston's The Flower of Gloster, which had been out of print since 1918. The book is today regarded as both a seminal work in canal literature and a classic example of Edwardian romanticism. The company also specialised in reprints of early technical and travel works and republished several issues of Baedeker's early-20th-century country guides as well some of the Edwardian works by Fred T. Jane.

=== Online learning ===
David and Charles creates and distributes online course materials in partnership with the Royal School of Needlework and Kew Gardens. In 2021, they published their first multi-platform journal, The Anti-Burnout Journal, written by Bex Spiller, combining traditional pen and paper journaling with an online course. David & Charles no longer collaborate with The Royal School of Needlework or Kew Gardens.

== See also ==
- List of English-language book publishing companies
- List of largest UK book publishers
