= The Oxford Dictionary of Quotations =

Oxford University Press's large dictionary of famous quotations

The Oxford Dictionary of Quotations is the Oxford University Press's dictionary of commonly known quotations and proverbs in the English language and culture. The 1st edition was published in 1941. The 8th edition, expanded to over 1150 pages and 20,000 quotations, was published in print and online versions in 2014.

Since 1991, there has also been a subset volume, The Oxford Dictionary of Modern Quotations, that focuses on quotations from the 20th century onwards. In the volume's Preface, editor Tony Augarde explains the process by which material is chosen for an Oxford dictionary of quotations:

This book is not—like many quotations dictionaries—a subjective anthology of the editor's favourite quotations, but an objective selection of the quotations which are most widely known and used. Popularity and familiarity are the main criteria for inclusion, although no reader is likely to be familiar with all the quotations in this dictionary....
The quotations are drawn from novels, plays, poems, essays, speeches, films, radio and television broadcasts, songs, advertisements, and even book titles. It is difficult to draw the line between quotations and similar sayings like proverbs, catch-phrases, and idioms. For example, some quotations (like "The opera ain't over till the fat lady sings") become proverbial. These are usually included if they can be traced to a particular originator. However, we have generally omitted phrases like "agonizing reappraisal" which are covered adequately in the Oxford English Dictionary. Catch-phrases are included if there is evidence that they are widely remembered or used.

== Editions ==
The 1941 edition was compiled by a committee drawn from the staff of the Oxford University Press (OUP) under the editorship of Alice Mary Smyth (later Alice Mary Hadfield). In her book on the life of committee member Charles Williams, Hadfield recounted some of the details of choosing and processing quotations. Subsequent editions of the Dictionary were published in 1953 and thereafter: the 6th edition appearing in 2004 (ISBN 0-19-860720-2), the 7th in 2009 (ISBN 0-19-923717-4), and the 8th in 2014 (ISBN 0-19-966870-1), all edited by Elizabeth Knowles.

OUP also publishes a Concise edition (9000 quotations) and a Little edition (4000 quotations).

== Organization and usage ==
The 8th edition of the dictionary is structured as follows:

- The first and largest section organizes the 20,000+ quotations by the last names, sorted alphabetically, of the author, originator, or person otherwise associated with a quotation. Therefore, if readers know an author's name, they can go directly to the quotations attributed to that author. Readers can also browse the first section to see which quotations were uttered by notable people, ranging from Aristotle to Søren Kierkegaard to Emile Zola.
- The second, smaller section of the book is a keyword index. Significant words from each quotation were extracted to build the index. For instance, if a reader is searching for the author of the quotation, "Never give a sucker an even break", the keyword index has a reference, under both "Sucker" and "Break", to the comedian W. C. Fields who is most associated with that quotation. The reader then flips to the book's first section where quotations are alphabetized by author name.

As an alternate mode of organizing, OUP began publishing in 2003 the Oxford Dictionary of Quotations by Subject. It groups quotations under hundreds of subject headings such as "Humour", "Memory", "Television", and "Weddings".

== See also ==
- Bartlett's Familiar Quotations
- The Yale Book of Quotations
