= Black Country New Road =

Road in the West Midlands, England

The Black Country New Road (or Black Country Spine Road) is a major road which runs through the West Midlands of England.

== History ==
The route was first planned during the 1980s, as a trunk road to link the planned Black Country Route at Bilston with Junction 1 of the M5 motorway in West Bromwich. In the early 1990s, it received impetus from the Black Country Development Corporation.

The first phase of the route was completed in July 1995, beginning with a half-mile stretch of dual carriageway linking the A41/A4038 junction in Moxley with the simultaneously completed final phase of the Black Country Route.

The second phase was completed in November 1995. This route was late in its completion because it made use of a four-span viaduct-style bridge over Eagle Crossing (carrying a section of railway between Walsall and Brierley Hill which had closed two years earlier) in the Toll End area of Tipton.

The third and final phase of the route was completed in the spring of 1997, with a one-mile (1.6 km) stretch of Holyhead Road being converted into a dual carriageway.

As well as relieving traffic congestion, the Black Country Spine Road also opened up several square miles of previously inaccessible land around Wednesbury and Tipton. This allowed for commercial and light industrial development to take place and create jobs in an area which since the 1970s had been hit by de-industrialisation and unemployment. Unemployment figures in some of the area surrounding the Spine Road are still relatively high, but the businesses set up along the route have boosted the local economy.

Visible in the middle of the road just before the Patent Shaft Roundabout is the exit from a former railway tunnel which ran to the Patent Shaft Steelworks, part of which occupied this site prior to closure in 1980.

== Canal Bridge ==
When plans were originally drawn up for the Road they included the provision of a navigable culvert under the road near the Swan Bridge roundabout to the Ridgacre Branch, part of the Birmingham Canal Navigations. However, when it was built this was not implemented and the canal was cut off from the canal network and lost to navigation. It remains in water and used for fishing, but without the traffic of boats is rapidly becoming silted up.

== In popular culture ==
The English rock band Black Country, New Road is named after this route. Former frontman Isaac Wood discovered its Wikipedia article using the 'random article' tool.
