= The Four Great Errors =

Mistakes of human reason proposed by Nietzsche

The Four Great Errors are four mistakes of human reason regarding causal relationships that the German philosopher Friedrich Nietzsche argues are the basis of all moral and religious propositions. Set forth in his book Twilight of the Idols, first published in 1889, these errors form the contrastive backdrop to his "revaluation of all values." Nietzsche wanted to liberate people from traditional moral and religious systems by denying the concept of "human accountability," which, he argues, is nothing more than an invention of theologians who wanted to exert power over other people. Unlike most religions and moral systems which hold that virtuous behavior results in happiness, Nietzsche argued the opposite. For Nietzsche, Internal psychological states such as "happiness" that we cannot consciously control are actually the true causes of virtuous behavior, not the human will.

The Four Great Errors are as follows:

1. The error of confusing cause and consequence
2. The error of a false causality
3. The error of imaginary causes
4. The error of free will

== The Four Great Errors ==
=== The Error of Confusing Cause and Consequence ===
Nietzsche argues that moral and religious statements are in error because they mistake causes for effect.

Take, for example, this moral statement: If P is virtuous, then P will be happy. Nietzsche insists that the opposite is true: If P is happy, then P will be virtuous. "A well-constituted human being, a 'happy one,'" he writes, "Must perform certain actions and instinctively shrinks from other actions … [H]is virtue is the consequence of his happiness." In Nietzsche's view, that which follows from instinct is marked by being "easy, necessary, free," is good. It is instinct, not conscious effort, which is the hallmark of virtuous behavior. Most moral maxims, in Nietzsche's view, reflect an absolutist position which suggest that certain moral behaviors are appropriate for everyone irrespective of the unique histories and circumstances of individual moral agents. "Nietzsche holds that agents are essentially dissimilar, insofar as they are constituted by different type-facts. Since Nietzsche also holds that these natural type-facts fix the different conditions under which particular agents will flourish, it follows that one morality cannot be good for all."

=== The Error of False Causality ===
Moral and religious statements are in error because they attribute human behavior to the existence of human will, spirit, and ego, the factual reality of which Nietzsche finds questionable.

People, Nietzsche maintains, mistakenly believe that they make decisions freely, attributing these decisions to the "inner facts" or notions of will, spirit, and ego. Nietzsche argues against the existence of these three notions. For example, will does not cause events to occur, it only accompanied them (Nietzsche also points out that it is possible for some events to not be accompanied by any will). Similarly, Nietzsche holds that spirit, in the form of motive, is merely an accompaniment to an action, but not a cause of it. Finally, he argues that the ego is simply a fiction. In short, there are no spiritual causes for human behavior.

=== The Error of Imaginary Causes ===
Nietzsche argues that when an event occurs, this event causes ideas in the mind, ideas which the subject mistakenly believes to be the cause of the original event. Nietzsche attributes the confusion over causes of an event to a basic human psychological need to eliminate the discomfort caused by the unknown. "To trace something unknown back to something known," he writes, "Is alleviating, soothing, gratifying and gives moreover a feeling of power."

This human aversion to the unknown or the unexplained, Nietzsche warns, may cause people to accept ideas based solely on their emotional appeal rather than on their factual accuracy. When experiencing an event, Nietzsche describes, a subject compares this current event to similar events in the past in his or her memory. As a result, the subject develops "causal interpretations," habits of memory and not an examination of the actual causes of the event in question. This is done, Nietzsche believes, because, causes or events that we find in memory are comforting to us because they are familiar. Causes that are "new," "unexperienced," or "strange," are not valued because they do not soothe our anxiety over the unknown.

These cause ascriptions, Nietzsche argues, eventually become more and more prevalent until they develop into systems of thought (as examples of these, Nietzsche gives business, romantic love, and Christianity). The problem with such systems is that they ultimately "exclude other causes and explanations." Systems of thought, Nietzsche maintains, can be an epistemological roadblock, preventing people from determining and verifying the real causes of events.

=== The Error of Free Will ===
Nietzsche argues that the notion of human free will is an invention of theologians developed fundamentally in order to exert control over humanity by "making mankind dependent" on them. The invention of a human free will, Nietzsche thinks, is rooted in a human drive to punish and judge.

"Everywhere accountability is sought, it is usually the instinct of punishing and judging which seeks it. One has deprived becoming of its innocence if being in this or that state is traced back to will, to intentions, to accountable acts: the doctrine of will has been invented essentially for the purpose of punishment, that is of finding guilty."

== Nietzsche’s conclusions ==
Nietzsche's program of a "revaluation of all values" seeks to deny the concept of "human accountability," which, he argues, was an invention of religious figures to hold power over mankind. "Men were thought of as 'free' so that they could become guilty; consequently, every action had to be thought of as willed, the origin of every action as lying in the consciousness." Instead, Nietzsche attributes behaviors to internal physiological states.

== See also ==
- Novum Organum – Book by Francis Bacon
  - Idola tribus – Type of logical fallacy
  - Idola specus – Type of logical fallacy
  - Idola fori – Category of logical fallacy
  - Idola theatri – Type of tendency towards logical fallacy

== Bibliography ==
- Nietzsche, Friedrich. Twilight of the Idols and The Anti-Christ.: trans. R. J. Hollingdale. New York: Penguin Books; 2003.
