= Romanticism and Bacon =

The Romantics, in seeking to understand nature in her living essence, studied the 'father of science', Sir Francis Bacon. The view of Bacon and the 'inductive method' that emerges is quite a different one from that tended to prevail both before and then after, here mainly due to John Stuart Mill's interpretation later in the 1800s. For the Romantics, induction as generally interpreted 'was not enough to produce correct understanding in Bacon's terms.' They saw another side of Bacon, generally not developed, one in which nature was a labyrinth not open to "excellence of wit" nor "chance experiments": "Our steps must be guided by a clue, and see what way from the first perception of the sense must be laid out upon a sure plan."

== Coleridge and Bacon ==
The chief spokesman for Romantic philosophy and the 'science of science' or epistemology, was Samuel Taylor Coleridge. An anonymous article (written by John Stuart Mill) published in the Westminster Review of 1840 noted that "the Romantic philosophy of Coleridge pervaded the minds and hearts of a significant portion of British intellectuals." Coleridge held that Bacon's view was that the secrets of nature, the inner essence that Bacon termed natura naturans, required a different "mode of knowing" from the intellect, but required a knowing that was "participative in its essence" and "above the ordinary human consciousness, a super-conscious mind." Here Coleridge refers to Bacon's idea of the 'Lumen siccum' - dry light or Platonic Idea that exists before and above any observation of nature, indeed directs and influences it - an organizing idea.

Must there not be some power, called with Lord Bacon the "LUMEN SICCUM"; or "the pure light", with LORD HERBERT; CALL IT "REASON", or call it the "Faith OF Reason" (WITH KANT), must there not be some power that stands in human nature but in some participation of the eternal and the universal by which man is enabled to question, nay to contradict, the irresistible impressions of his own senses, NAY, the necessary deductions of his own understanding-to CHALLENGE and disqualify them, as partial and INCOMPETENT?

A good example of what Coleridge is talking about would be the shift from the Ptolemaic, earth-centred universe, which accords with man's immediate experience, to the Copernican, helio-centric one, which accords with reason. Without the benefit of the organizing idea involving a higher cognitive faculty, science will tend to deal with secondary aspects of nature instead of the primary, essential properties. As Richard Saumarez, a contemporary of Coleridge, and the creator of a dynamic understanding of physiology, wrote:

I complain that the present system of what is called philosophy, is an artificial, not a natural one; and that the very first dictum, or aphorism, proclaimed by LORD BACON, in his NOVUM ORGANUM, is altogether violated by our philosophers.—"Homo Naturæ minister et interpres, tantum facit & intelligit, quantum de naturæ ordine, re vel mente observaverit; nec amplius scit aut potest." [Man, being the servant and interpreter of Nature, can do and understand so much and so much only as he has observed in fact or in thought of the course of nature. Beyond this he neither knows anything nor can do anything.]

An example of this is the difference between Newton's approach to understanding color as seen via light bent through a prism (secondary event) and Goethe's approach which involved the direct observation (in the original sense of participation using that faculty of mind Coleridge called for) as set out in his Chromatology (Farbenlehre).

For Coleridge, Bacon's emphasis on clearing the "idols' that refract and distort the intellect, and developing a higher cognitive capacity is an integral part of Bacon's method for science.

"Non leve quiddam interest inter human mentis idola et divin mentis ideas, hoc est, inter placita qudam inania et veras signaturas atque impressiones factas in creaturis, prout Ratione san et sicci luminis, quam docendi caus interpretem natur vocare consuevimus, inveniuntur." [Tr: "There is an important difference between the illusions of the human mind and the ideas of the divine mind; that is, between pleasant vanities and the true and intrinsic signatures and impressions of things just as they are found by sound Reason and the dry light that for teaching's sake we are in the habit of calling the interpretation of nature".] Novum ORGANUM xxiii. & xxvi. ...

For Coleridge, Bacon is rightly seen as the 'father of science', but not for the right reasons. Coleridge set out to correct what he saw as a misunderstanding of Bacon's scientific method. First he deals with the “original Science of natura naturata methodology of Francis Bacon.” He notes with Saumarez that Bacon also calls for an 'organizing idea' in science which both frames and helps to realize the experiment.

In the first instance, Lord Bacon equally with ourselves, demands what we have ventured to call the mental initiative, as the motive and guide of every philosophical experiment; some well-grounded purpose, some distinct impression of the probable results, some self-consistent anticipation as the ground of the "prudens questio" (the forethoughtful query–"Put a question well and you already know half the subject".), which he affirms to be the prior half of the knowledge sought, dimidium scienti. With him, therefore, as with us, an idea is an experiment proposed, an experiment is an idea realized.

While it is true that Bacon praises the experiment over sense perception, this is in the context of there being a valid organizing idea to begin with. Without it, sense perception will amount to pure empiricism, which may lead to a compass (technology), but no advance in science (Idea and Law), but also without it, experiment becomes arid and without foundation in reality.

... the truths which have their signatures in nature, and which (as he himself plainly and often asserts) may indeed be revealed to us through and with, but never by the senses, or the faculty of sense. Otherwise, indeed, instead of being more objective than the former (which they are not in any sense, both being in this respect the same), they would be less so, and, in fact, incapable of being insulated from the "Idola tribus qu in ips natur humana fundata sunt, atque in ips tribu seu gente hominum: cum onmes perceptiones tam senss quam mentis, sunt ex analogi hominis non ex analogi universi."[Tr: "The idols of the tribe that are founded on human nature itself, and in the very tribe or race of men: since all our perceptions, whether of sense or mind, are [formed] on the analogy of man, not on the analogy of the world".] (N.O. xli.)

While experiment is important to avoid subjective sense-impressions, as Bacon rightly says, what he says for Coleridge is that " our perception can apprehend through the organs of sense only the phenomena evoked by the experiment, but that same power of mind which out of its own laws has proposed the experiment, can judge whether in nature there is a law correspondent to the same."

But in this instance, as indeed throughout all his works, the meaning is clear and evident–namely, that the sense can apprehend, through the organs of sense, only the phenomena evoked by the experiment: vis ver mentis ea, qu experimentum excogitaverat, de Rejudicet [Tr: "He adapts the issue to the investigation of the point at issue, and by it he judges the Fact".]: i.e. that power which, out of its own conceptions had shaped the experiment, must alone determine the true import of the phenomena.

The organizing idea for Bacon is something different from sense-experience.

According to Lord Bacon... an idea would be defined as intuitio sive inventio, quae in perceptione sensus non est (ut quae purae et sicci luminis intellectioni est propria) idearum divinae mentis, prout in creaturis per signaturas suas sese patefaciant. [Tr: "An intuition or discovery of ideas of the divine mind, in the same way that they disclose themselves in things by their own signatures, and this (as is proper to the dry light's Intellection) is not in [the field of] sense perception".]

So in summary, for Coleridge, Bacon's system is properly one that derives from and depends on the supersensible realm.

This therefore is the true Baconic philosophy. It consists in this, in a profound meditation on those laws which the pure reason [Nous poieticos] in man reveals to him, with the confident anticipation and faith that to this will be found to correspond certain laws in nature... and that nature itself is but the greater mirror in which he beholds [theorizes] [nous patheticos - Gemüt] his own present and his own past being in the law, and learns to reverence while he feels the necessity of that one great Being whose eternal reason [Nous] is the ground and absolute condition of the ideas in the mind, and no less the ground and the absolute cause of all the correspondent realities in nature–the reality of nature forever consisting in the law by which each thing is that which it is. Hence, and so has Lord Bacon told us, all science approaches to its perfection in proportion as it immaterializes objects [cf. Goethe's 'plant']. For instance, in the motion of the heavenly bodies, we in reality consider only a few obstructions of mass, distance, and so forth. The whole phenomenon of light, the materiality of which itself has been more than once doubted of, is nothing but a sublime geometry drawn by its rays; while in magnetism, the phenomenon is altogether lost and the whole process by which we trace it is the power of intellect. We know it not as visible but by its powers.

Thus, method involves the ordering of sense-data according to an idea which is not derived from the senses, but informs the data, such that their meaning is revealed when properly ordered - this order is not a matter of chance or random happenings out of the sense-data, but directed by the very nature of the idea being used, consciously or sub-consciously (as is most often the case in scientific genius).

It is in this sense, we will affirm, that the parts, as means to an end, derive their position, and therein their qualities (or character)–nay, we dare add, their very existence as particular things–from the antecedent method, or self-organizing PURPOSE; upon which therefore we have dwelt so long.

From our innate experience of a connection with that which we experience as also separate, arises the necessary corollary that there is a dynamic relationship (because polar) between ourselves and nature.

Least of all can this mysterious predisposition exist without evolving a belief that the productive power [Dynamis], which acts in nature as nature, is essentially one (i.e. of one kind) with [its homologous presence] the intelligence, which is in the human mind above nature:...though like heat in the thawing of ice, it may appear only in its effects. So universally has this conviction leavened the very substance of all discourse, that there is no language on earth in which a man can abjure it as a prejudice, without employing terms and conjunctions that suppose its reality... In all aggregates of construction therefore, which we contemplate as wholes, whether as integral parts or as a system, we assume an intention, as the initiative, of which the end is the correlative.

Thus, the method of inquiry that Coleridge develops 'is a holistic, relational metaphysic that is perpetually self-correcting' and this ongoing metaphysical/scientific inquiry has two defining features: a leading thought and a progression or advancement, that it 'cannot...otherwise than by abuse, be applied to a mere dead arrangement, containing in itself a distinct science, the immediate offspring of philosophy, and the link or mordant by which philosophy becomes scientific and the sciences philosophical'.

=== Whewell and Bacon's method ===
Whewell's inductivism shares "numerous features with Bacon's method of interpreting nature" such as that induction must go beyond merely simple collation of instances and that inductive science can reach unobservables - "for Bacon, the “forms,” for Whewell, unobservable entities such as light waves or properties such as elliptical orbits or gravitational forces."

For Whewell as for Bacon the mind had to be engaged actively in what was selected for observation and then when it was observed, otherwise "the resulting theory is not an “induction,” but rather a “hasty and imperfect hypothesis.”

Whewell's is an inductive method "yet it clearly differs from the more narrow inductivism of Mill."

=== Peirce and abductive reasoning ===
Charles Sanders Peirce pointed out why Bacon's approach, which involves what he calls abduction as well as induction, tended to become reduced to induction, and then collapsed by Popper into the hypothetico-deductive model, where the hypothesis, which contains both the abductive inference and the inductive reasoning, becomes just a guess rather than being seen as a result of careful thought - Bacon's 'lumens siccum'.

== Notes ==
Clue: Bacon is using "clue" not in the modern sense but in an older one, a strand of yarn etc. as used to guide one through a labyrinth. Taken with his use of the word "labyrinth", this alludes to the myth of Theseus and the Minotaur:

On his arrival in Crete, Ariadne, King Minos' daughter, fell in love with Theseus and, on the advice of Daedalus, gave him a ball of thread (a clew), so he could find his way out of the Labyrinth.... As soon as Theseus entered the Labyrinth, he tied one end of the ball of string to the door post...
After decapitating the beast, Theseus used the string to escape the Labyrinth and managed to escape...
