= Baconian method =

Investigative process

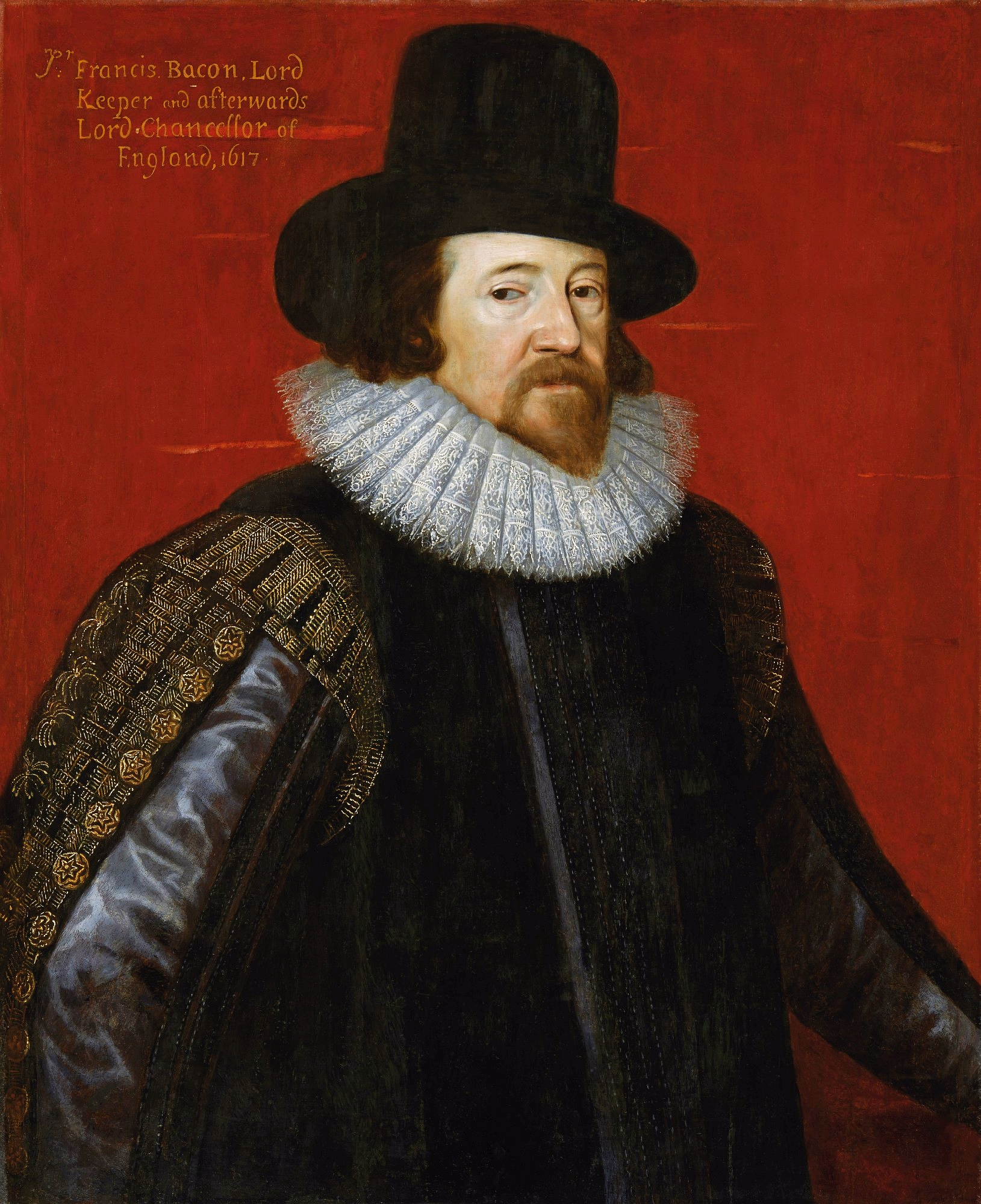
Portrait of Francis Bacon

The Baconian method is the investigative method developed by Francis Bacon, one of the founders of modern science, and thus a first formulation of a modern scientific method. The method was put forward in Bacon's book Novum Organum (1620), or 'New Method', to replace the old methods put forward in Aristotle's Organon. It influenced the early modern rejection of medieval Aristotelianism.

== Description in the Novum Organum ==
=== Bacon's view of induction ===
Bacon's method is an example of the application of inductive reasoning. However, Bacon's method of induction is much more complex than the essential inductive process of making generalisations from observations. Bacon's method begins with description of the requirements for making the careful, systematic observations necessary to produce quality facts. He then proceeds to use induction, the ability to generalise from a set of facts to one or more axioms. However, he stresses the necessity of not generalising beyond what the facts truly demonstrate. The next step may be to gather additional data, or the researcher may use existing data and the new axioms to establish additional axioms. Specific types of facts can be particularly useful, such as negative instances, exceptional instances and data from experiments. The whole process is repeated in a stepwise fashion to build an increasingly complex base of knowledge, but one which is always supported by observed facts, or more generally speaking, empirical data.

He argues in the Novum Organum that our only hope for building true knowledge is through this careful method. Old knowledge-building methods were often not based in facts, but on broad, ill-proven deductions and metaphysical conjecture. Even when theories were based in fact, they were often broad generalisations and/or abstractions from few instances of casually gathered observations. Using Bacon's process, man could start fresh, setting aside old superstitions, over-generalisations, and traditional (often unproven) "facts". Researchers could slowly but accurately build an essential base of knowledge from the ground up. Describing then-existing knowledge, Bacon claims:

There is the same degree of licentiousness and error in forming axioms as [there is] in abstracting notions, and [also] in the first principles, which depend in common induction [versus Bacon's induction]; still more is this the case in axioms and inferior propositions derived from syllogisms.

While he advocated a very empirical, observational, reasoned method that did away with metaphysical conjecture, Bacon was a religious man, believed in God, and believed his work had a religious role. He contended, like other researchers at the time, that by doing this careful work man could begin to understand God's wonderful creation, to reclaim the knowledge that had been lost in Adam and Eve's "fall", and to make the most of his God-given talents.

=== Role of the English Reformation ===
There is a wider array of seminal works about the interaction of Puritanism and early science. Among others, Dorothy Stimson, Richard Foster Jones, and Robert Merton saw Puritanism as a major driver of the reforms initiated by Bacon and the development of science overall. Steven Matthews is cautious about the interaction with a single confession, as the English Reformation allowed a higher doctrinal diversity compared to the continent. However, Matthews is quite outspoken that "Bacon's entire understanding of what we call 'science,' and what he called 'natural philosophy,' was fashioned around the basic tenets of his belief system."

=== Approach to causality ===
The method consists of procedures for isolating and further investigating the form nature, or cause, of a phenomenon, including the method of agreement, method of difference, and method of concomitant variation.

Bacon suggests that you draw up a list of all things in which the phenomenon you are trying to explain occurs, as well as a list of things in which it does not occur. Then you rank your lists according to the degree in which the phenomenon occurs in each one. Then you should be able to deduce what factors match the occurrence of the phenomenon in one list and don't occur in the other list, and also what factors change in accordance with the way the data had been ranked.

Thus, if an army is successful when commanded by Essex, and not successful when not commanded by Essex: and when it is more or less successful according to the degree of involvement of Essex as its commander, then it is scientifically reasonable to say that being commanded by Essex is causally related to the army's success.

From this Bacon suggests that the underlying cause of the phenomenon, what he calls the "form", can be approximated by interpreting the results of one's observations. This approximation Bacon calls the "First Vintage". It is not a final conclusion about the formal cause of the phenomenon but merely a hypothesis. It is only the first stage in the attempt to find the form and it must be scrutinised and compared to other hypotheses. In this manner, the truth of natural philosophy is approached "by gradual degrees", as stated in his Novum Organum.

=== Refinements ===
The "Baconian method" does not end at the First Vintage. Bacon described numerous classes of Instances with Special Powers, cases in which the phenomenon one is attempting to explain is particularly relevant. These instances, of which Bacon describes 27 in the Novum Organum, aid and accelerate the process of induction.

Aside from the First Vintage and the Instances with Special Powers, Bacon enumerates additional "aids to the intellect" which presumably are the next steps in his method. These additional aids, however, were never explained beyond their initial limited appearance in Novum Organum.

== Natural history ==
The Natural History of Pliny the Elder was a classical Roman encyclopedia work. Induction, for Bacon's followers, meant a type of rigour applied to factual matters. Reasoning should not be applied in plain fashion to just any collection of examples, an approach identified as "Plinian". In considering natural facts, a fuller survey was required to form a basis for going further. Bacon made it clear he was looking for more than "a botany" with discursive accretions.

In concrete terms, the cabinet of curiosities, exemplifying the Plinian approach, was to be upgraded from a source of wonderment to a challenge to science. The main source in Bacon's works for the approach was his Sylva Sylvarum, and it suggested a more systematic collection of data in the search for causal explanations.

Underlying the method, as applied in this context, are therefore the "tables of natural history" and the ways in which they are to be constructed. Bacon's background in the common law has been proposed as a source for this concept of investigation.

As a general intellectual programme, Bacon's ideas on "natural history" have been seen as a broad influence on British writers later in the 17th century, in particular in economic thought and within the Royal Society.

== Idols of the mind (idola mentis) ==
Bacon also listed what he called the idols (false images) of the mind. He described these as things which obstructed the path of correct scientific reasoning.

1. Idols of the Tribe (Idola tribus): This is humans' tendency to perceive more order and regularity in systems than truly exists, and is due to people following their preconceived ideas about things.
2. Idols of the Cave (Idola specus): This is due to individuals' personal weaknesses in reasoning due to particular personalities, likes and dislikes.
3. Idols of the Marketplace (Idola fori): This is due to confusion in the use of language and taking some words in science to have a different meaning than their common usage.
4. Idols of the Theatre (Idola theatri): This is the following of academic dogma and not asking questions about the world.

== Influence ==
The physician Thomas Browne (1605–1682) was one of the first scientists to adhere to the empiricism of the Baconian method. His encyclopaedia Pseudodoxia Epidemica (1st edition 1646 – 5th edition 1672) includes numerous examples of Baconian investigative methodology, while its preface echoes lines from Bacon's On Truth from The Advancement of Learning (1605). Isaac Newton's saying hypotheses non fingo (I don't frame hypotheses) occurs in later editions of the Principia. It represents his preference for rules that could be demonstrated, as opposed to unevidenced hypotheses.

The Baconian method was further developed and promoted by John Stuart Mill. His 1843 book, A System of Logic, was an effort to shed further light on issues of causation. In this work, he formulated the five principles of inductive reasoning now known as Mill's methods.

== Frankfurt School critique of Baconian method ==
Max Horkheimer and Theodor Adorno observe that Bacon shuns "knowledge that tendeth but to satisfaction" in favor of effective procedures. While the Baconian method disparages idols of the mind, its requirement for effective procedures compels it to adopt a credulous, submissive stance toward worldly power.

Power confronts the individual as the universal, as the reason which informs reality.
Knowledge, which is power, knows no limits, either in its enslavement of creation or in its deference to worldly masters.

Horkheimer and Adorno offer a plea to recover the virtues of the "metaphysical apologia", which is able to reveal the injustice of effective procedures rather than merely employing them.

The metaphysical apologia at least betrayed the injustice of the established order through the incongruence of concept and reality. The impartiality of scientific language deprived what was powerless of the strength to make itself heard and merely provided the existing order with a neutral sign for itself. Such neutrality is more metaphysical than metaphysics.

== See also ==
- Corroborating evidence
