= Idola fori =

Category of logical fallacy

Idola fori (singular Idolum fori), sometimes translated as "Idols of the Market Place" or "Idols of the Forum", are a category of logical fallacy which results from the imperfect correspondences between the word definitions in natural language, and the real things in nature which these words represent. The term was coined in Latin by Sir Francis Bacon and used in his Novum Organum, one of the earliest treatises arguing the case for the logic and method of modern science.

== Overview ==
The term is one of four such "idols" which represent "idols and false notions which are now in possession of the human understanding, and have taken deep root therein". Because of them, "truth can hardly find entrance" in people's minds, and Bacon predicted that even after the "instauration of the sciences" which he proposes, they will "meet and trouble us, unless men being forewarned of the danger fortify themselves as far as may be against their assaults". They are in other words problems for science, and successful modern scientific method will need to try to avoid them.

Besides idola fori, there are also idola tribus (Idols of the Tribe, coming from human nature itself), idola specus, (Idols of the cave, coming from the tendencies of particular individuals or groups of people) and idola theatri (Idols of the theatre, caused by the influence of philosophers and systems of thought). Together the four idols are referred to as the Idols of the Mind (idola mentis).

== Bacon's description ==
Bacon said that the Idols of the Market Place were given this name by him "on account of the commerce and consort of men there. For it is by discourse that men associate, and words are imposed according to the apprehension of the vulgar. And therefore the ill and unfit choice of words wonderfully obstructs the understanding".

But the Idols of the Market Place are the most troublesome of all—idols which have crept into the understanding through the alliances of words and names. For men believe that their reason governs words; but it is also true that words react on the understanding; and this it is that has rendered philosophy and the sciences sophistical and inactive. Now words, being commonly framed and applied according to the capacity of the vulgar, follow those lines of division which are most obvious to the vulgar understanding. And whenever an understanding of greater acuteness or a more diligent observation would alter those lines to suit the true divisions of nature, words stand in the way and resist the change. Whence it comes to pass that the high and formal discussions of learned men end oftentimes in disputes about words and names; with which (according to the use and wisdom of the mathematicians) it would be more prudent to begin, and so by means of definitions reduce them to order. Yet even definitions cannot cure this evil in dealing with natural and material things, since the definitions themselves consist of words, and those words beget others. So that it is necessary to recur to individual instances, and those in due series and order, as I shall say presently when I come to the method and scheme for the formation of notions and axioms.

— Novum Organum, Aphorism LIX

Bacon said that there were two basic kinds of Idol of the Market Place:

- The first are "names of things which do not exist (for as there are things left unnamed through lack of observation, so likewise are their names which result from fantastic suppositions and to which nothing in reality corresponds)" But this first kind "is more easily expelled, because to get rid of them it is only necessary that all theories should be steadily rejected and dismissed as obsolete."
- The second are "names of things which exist, but yet confused and ill-defined, and hastily and irregularly derived from realities."

According to Bacon, it is the second class, "which springs out of a faulty and unskillful abstraction", is "intricate and deeply rooted". This is because it has to do with the way words themselves can guide thinking. Nevertheless, there are "certain degrees of distortion and error". Bacon says that "some notions are of necessity a little better than others, in proportion to the greater variety of subjects that fall within the range of the human sense."

Bacon recognized that the normal approach of "learned men" was to be careful about definitions and explanations, setting the matter right "in some things". But nevertheless, "words plainly force and overrule the understanding, and throw all into confusion, and lead men away into numberless empty controversies and idle fancies."

== Historical context ==
That errors inevitably come from the imperfect generalizations in natural languages, and that philosophers or scientists must be careful of this danger, is an ancient theme of philosophy. It was for example a problem appreciated by Aristotle, and had been noted by William of Occam in the Middle Ages. But Bacon's idola fori is the best-known example of the increased seriousness given by early modern humanists to problematic uses of language. After Bacon, this concern was further emphasized by authors such as Thomas Hobbes and John Locke.
