= Idola specus =

Type of logical fallacy

Idola specus (singular Idolum specus), normally translated as "Idols of the Cave" (or "Idols of the Den"), is a type of logical fallacy whereby the peculiar biases of individuals lead them to errors. This Latin term was coined by Sir Francis Bacon and used in his Novum Organum, one of the earliest treatises arguing the case for the logic and method of modern science. He described them as deriving from "the peculiar constitution, mental or bodily, of each individual; and also in education, habit, and accident".

== Overview ==
The idola specus are prejudices, by which individuals inappropriately extend norms or tenets that derive his or her own culture and social group, or to his or her own preferences. Racism, sexism and, more generally just "biases" are examples of idola specus, but the concept goes beyond them to the criticism of all forms of irreflexive subjectivity or individual predisposition.

The term is one of four such "idols" which represent "idols and false notions which are now in possession of the human understanding, and have taken deep root therein, not only so beset men's minds that truth can hardly find entrance, but even after entrance is obtained, they will again in the very instauration of the sciences meet and trouble us, unless men being forewarned of the danger fortify themselves as far as may be against their assaults".

Besides idola specus, there are also idola tribus (Idols of the Tribe, caused by human nature), idola fori, (Idols of the Market Place, caused by language) and idola theatri (Idols of the Theatre, which are caused by the influence of philosophers).

The Idols of the Cave are the idols of the individual man. For everyone (besides the errors common to human nature in general) has a cave or den of his own, which refracts and discolors the light of nature, owing either to his own proper and peculiar nature; or to his education and conversation with others; or to the reading of books, and the authority of those whom he esteems and admires; or to the differences of impressions, accordingly as they take place in a mind preoccupied and predisposed or in a mind indifferent and settled; or the like. So that the spirit of man (according as it is meted out to different individuals) is in fact a thing variable and full of perturbation, and governed as it were by chance. Whence it was well observed by Heraclitus that men look for sciences in their own lesser worlds, and not in the greater or common world.

— Novum Organum, Aphorism XLII

In more detail, Bacon said that there are a "great number and variety" of idols of the cave but he chooses to select examples which give "the most important caution", and which "have most effect in disturbing the clearness of the understanding". He judged that they "grow for the most part either out of the predominance of a favorite subject, or out of an excessive tendency to compare or to distinguish, or out of partiality for particular ages, or out of the largeness or minuteness of the objects contemplated." Concerning these most important variants he wrote in more detail:

- One common reason for a prejudice is that people "become attached to certain particular sciences and speculations, either because they fancy themselves the authors and inventors thereof, or because they have bestowed the greatest pains upon them and become most habituated to them."
- Bacon remarks that with respect to philosophy and science, there are two radically different types of minds. These manifest idola specus in different ways, but both suffer from it. Some "steady and acute" minds are "stronger and apter to mark the differences of things", fixing upon "the subtlest distinctions". Others are "lofty and discursive" and more prone to mark resemblances, recognizing and putting together "the finest and most general resemblances". "Both kinds, however, easily err in excess, by catching the one at gradations, the other at shadows."
- Bacon also notes another distinction which causes different manifestations of idola specus: "There are found some minds given to an extreme admiration of antiquity, others to an extreme love and appetite for novelty; but few so duly tempered that they can hold the mean, neither carping at what has been well laid down by the ancients, nor despising what is well introduced by the moderns."
- Finally, another common cause of idola specus when looking specifically at "contemplations of nature" is that this sometimes requires looking at things in their "simple form". This breaks up and distracts the understanding. Bacon mentions Leucippus and Democritus as compared with the other philosophies. For that school is so busied with the particles that it hardly attends to the structure. On the other hand, "contemplations of nature and bodies in their composition and configuration overpower and dissolve the understanding". And some contemplators of nature become "so lost in admiration of the structure that they do not penetrate to the simplicity of nature". As a way of avoiding these problems, Bacon recommends that these two types of contemplation should be "alternated and taken by turns, so that the understanding may be rendered at once penetrating and comprehensive, and the inconveniences above mentioned, with the idols which proceed from them, may be avoided".

Bacon also drew general advice for more methodical future study of nature, aimed at avoiding the idols of the cave: "generally let every student of nature take this as a rule: that whatever his mind seizes and dwells upon with peculiar satisfaction is to be held in suspicion, and that so much the more care is to be taken in dealing with such questions to keep the understanding even and clear."

== See also ==
- Idols of the mind
