= Idola tribus =

Type of logical fallacy

Idola tribus (singular Idolum tribus) is a category of logical fallacy, normally translated as "Idols of the Tribe", which refers to a tendency of human nature to prefer certain types of incorrect anthropocentric conclusions. It is a Latin term, coined by Sir Francis Bacon and used in his Novum Organum, one of the earliest treatises arguing the case for the methodical approach of modern science.

== Overview ==
The idols of the tribe form one of four such groups of "idols" which represent "idols and false notions which are now in possession of the human understanding, and have taken deep root therein, not only so beset men's minds that truth can hardly find entrance, but even after entrance is obtained, they will again in the very instauration of the sciences meet and trouble us, unless men being forewarned of the danger fortify themselves as far as may be against their assaults.

Besides idola tribus, there are also:

- idola specus (Idols of the Cave, caused by one's personal peculiarities and experiences)
- idola fori (Idols of the Market Place, caused by language)
- idola theatri (Idols of the Theatre, caused by philosophers)

The Idols of the Tribe have their foundation in human nature itself, and in the tribe or race of men. For it is a false assertion that the sense of man is the measure of things. On the contrary, all perceptions as well of the sense as of the mind are according to the measure of the individual and not according to the measure of the universe. And the human understanding is like a false mirror, which, receiving rays irregularly, distorts and discolors the nature of things by mingling its own nature with it.

— Novum Organum, Aphorism XLI.

And so in this category are cases of people being misled by anthropomorphism. In more detail, Bacon enumerated several specific such barriers to science which are part of human nature, coming into the "Idols of the Tribe" category:

- "The human understanding is of its own nature prone to suppose the existence of more order and regularity in the world than it finds."
- "The human understanding when it has once adopted an opinion (either as being the received opinion or as being agreeable to itself) draws all things else to support and agree with it."
- "The human understanding is moved by those things most which strike and enter the mind simultaneously and suddenly, and so fill the imagination; and then it feigns and supposes all other things to be somehow, though it cannot see how, similar to those few things by which it is surrounded."
- "The human understanding is unquiet; it cannot stop or rest, and still presses onward, but in vain. Therefore it is that we cannot conceive of any end or limit to the world, but always as of necessity it occurs to us that there is something beyond." Bacon gives as an example the Aristotelian doctrine of final cause, which he says has "relation clearly to the nature of man rather than to the nature of the universe; and from this source have strangely defiled philosophy".
- "The human understanding is no dry light, but receives an infusion from the will and affections; whence proceed sciences which may be called 'sciences as one would.' For what a man had rather were true he more readily believes."
- "But by far the greatest hindrance and aberration of the human understanding proceeds from the dullness, incompetency, and deceptions of the senses; in that things which strike the sense outweigh things which do not immediately strike it, though they be more important."
- "The human understanding is of its own nature prone to abstractions and gives a substance and reality to things which are fleeting."

Bacon states that the Idols of the Tribe "take their rise either from the homogeneity of the substance of the human spirit, or from its preoccupation, or from its narrowness, or from its restless motion, or from an infusion of the affections, or from the incompetency of the senses, or from the mode of impression".

== See also ==
- Idols of the mind
- Doxa
