= Idola theatri =

Type of tendency towards logical fallacy

Idola theatri (singular Idolum theatri) is a type of tendency towards logical fallacy or error, normally translated as "idols of the theatre". The Latin was coined by Sir Francis Bacon in his Novum Organum—one of the earliest treatises arguing the case for the logic and method of modern science. Bacon described them as "Idols which have immigrated into men's minds from the various dogmas of philosophies, and also from wrong laws of demonstration." He named them Idols of the Theater "because in my judgment all the received systems are but so many stage plays, representing worlds of their own creation after an unreal and scenic fashion."

== Overview ==
The term is one of four such "idols", that represent "idols and false notions" that are "in possession of the human understanding, and have taken deep root therein, not only so beset men's minds that truth can hardly find entrance, but even after entrance is obtained, they will again in the very instauration of the sciences meet and trouble us, unless men being forewarned of the danger fortify themselves as far as may be against their assaults". Of these, the Idola theatri are the most avoidable according to Bacon, being caused by particular historical situations, such as when there is a lot of interest in religion, and no strong monarch to repress such discussion.

Besides idola theatri, there are also idola tribus (Idols of the Tribe, stemming from human nature itself), idola specus, (Idols of the cave, stemming from a person's particular tendencies), and idola fori (Idols of the Market Place, coming from the influence of our human language and its usages).

== Bacon's explanation ==
According to Howard B. White:

In the famous discussion of the four idols, Bacon says that only one kind, the Idols of the Theater, are not innate; nor do they steal "into the understanding secretly." Therefore, they, at least, can be removed.(N.O. I,61) Since, alone among all the idols, they are created by philosophical systems, alone, among all the idols, they may be removed by philosophical systems. Obviously, the principal idol of the theater to Bacon was Aristotle.

But Aristotle was not the only example for Bacon, who wrote:

Nor is it only of the systems now in vogue, or only of the ancient sects and philosophies, that I speak; for many more plays of the same kind may yet be composed and in like artificial manner set forth; seeing that errors the most widely different have nevertheless causes for the most part alike. Neither again do I mean this only of entire systems, but also of many principles and axioms in science, which by tradition, credulity, and negligence have come to be received.

Concerning the number of variations of this type, Bacon says furthermore:

Idols of the Theater, or of Systems, are many, and there can be and perhaps will be yet many more. For were it not that now for many ages men's minds have been busied with religion and theology; and were it not that civil governments, especially monarchies, have been averse to such novelties, even in matters speculative; so that men labor therein to the peril and harming of their fortunes—not only unrewarded, but exposed also to contempt and envy—doubtless there would have arisen many other philosophical sects like those which in great variety flourished once among the Greeks. For as on the phenomena of the heavens many hypotheses may be constructed, so likewise (and more also) many various dogmas may be set up and established on the phenomena of philosophy. And in the plays of this philosophical theater you may observe the same thing which is found in the theater of the poets, that stories invented for the stage are more compact and elegant, and more as one would wish them to be, than true stories out of history.

Nevertheless, he distinguished three types for special attention:

- The Rational or Sophistical School of philosophers "snatches from experience a variety of common instances, neither duly ascertained nor diligently examined and weighed, and leaves all the rest to meditation and agitation of wit." The most conspicuous example of this type, says Bacon, was Aristotle.
- A second "Empirical" class of philosophers "who, having bestowed much diligent and careful labor on a few experiments, have thence made bold to educe and construct systems, wresting all other facts in a strange fashion to conformity therewith." As examples, Bacon mentions the chemists or alchemists of his day and William Gilbert's work on magnets.
- A third class, a Superstitious type, "consisting of those who out of faith and veneration mix their philosophy with theology and traditions; among whom the vanity of some has gone so far aside as to seek the origin of sciences among spirits and genii." Bacon said that Pythagoras and Plato were striking examples of this problem. From "this unwholsome mixture of things human and divine there arises not only a fantastic philosophy but also an heretical religion."

Bacon said that, in his time, the last type, the superstitious, was most common, and did the most harm.

Superstition was the subject of one of Bacon's well-known Essays, and as Howard B White points out, Bacon made it clear that he considered Catholicism, for example, to be a form of Christian superstition, and that he felt atheism to be superior to superstition. But "while the classics also regarded superstition as at variance with philosophy" they did not "regard it as necessary or desirable to wage an onslaught against existing superstition".

== See also ==
- Idols of the mind
