= Brawley =

Brawley may refer to:

== Places ==
- Brawley, California, a city in Imperial County, California, United States
- Brawley, Missouri, an unincorporated community
- Brawley Peaks, a mountain range in Mono County, California
- Brawley Seismic Zone, at the south end of the San Andreas Fault

== Other uses ==
- Brawley (surname)
- Brawley Municipal Airport, public airport in Brawley, California, United States
- Brawley Union High School, a high school in Brawley, California, United States
