= Rawley =

Rawley may refer to:

Surname:

- Eva Rawley, fictional character in the American situation comedy TV series 227 aired on NBC, 1985–1990
- Judy Crawford Rawley (born 1951), retired Canadian alpine skier who competed at the 1972 Winter Olympics
- Mojo Rawley (born 1986), American professional wrestler
- Shane Rawley (born 1955), former Major League Baseball pitcher
- The Honourable Mr Justice Stephen Rawley, fictional character in the television series Porridge
- William Rawley, the chaplain of major 17th-century English figures, including Francis Bacon, King Charles I, and King Charles II

Given name:

- Rawley Silver, American art therapist, artist, author, and educator
- Rawley Valverde (born 1966), American television actor

Geography:

- Rawley House, historic home located at Leipsic, Kent County, Delaware
- Rawley Point Light, a lighthouse in Point Beach State Forest, near Two Rivers, Wisconsin
- Rawley Springs, Virginia, unincorporated community in Rockingham County, Virginia. USA

== See also ==
- James A. Rawley Prize (AHA), a history prize awarded by the American Historical Association (AHA) for the best book in Atlantic history
- James A. Rawley Prize (OAH), a history prize awarded by the Organization of American Historians (OAH) for the best book on race relations in the United States
- Brawley (disambiguation)
- Crawley
- Frawley
- Rawle (disambiguation)
- Rawnsley
- Shrawley
