= Bill Crowley =

Bill Crowley may refer to:

- Bill Crowley (baseball) (1857–1891), American Major League Baseball player
- Bill Crowley (sportscaster) (1920–1996), American sportscaster

== See also ==
- Bill Cowley
- William Crawley (disambiguation)
- William Rowley (disambiguation)
