= William Rowley (disambiguation) =

William Rowley (1585?–1626) was an English Jacobean dramatist.

William Rowley may also refer to:

- William Rowley (Royal Navy officer) (1690–1768), Admiral of the Fleet in the British Royal Navy; Member of Parliament for Portsmouth
- Sir William Rowley, 2nd Baronet (1761–1832), British Member of Parliament for Suffolk
- William Rowley (Kinsale MP) (fl. 1801), Member of Parliament for Kinsale
- William R. Rowley (1824–1886), aide-de-camp to Ulysses S. Grant
- Bill Rowley (1865–1934), English footballer
- Bill Rowley (rugby league) (1889–?), Australian rugby league footballer

== See also ==
- William Rawley (c. 1588–1667), English chaplain
- William Rolley (1839–1912), British trade unionist and political activist
- William Rawle (1759–1836), American lawyer
- William Brawley (disambiguation)
