= House of Solomon =

House of Solomon may refer to:

- Davidic line, a Jewish lineage
- Solomonic dynasty, an Ethiopian dynasty
- Salomon's House, a fictional institution in the novel New Atlantis
