= Jake Sanchez =

Mexican-American baseball player (born 1989)

Caliente de Durango – No. 47
- Pitcher
- Born: August 19, 1989 (age 36); Brawley, California, U.S.
- Bats: Right Throws: Right
- Stats at Baseball Reference

Career highlights and awards
- Mexican Pacific League records: 26 saves, single season
Medals
Men's baseball
Representing Mexico
World Baseball Classic
| Bronze medal – third place | 2023 Miami | Team |

Jacob Sanchez (born August 19, 1989) is a Mexican-American professional baseball pitcher for the Caliente de Durango of the Mexican League. He has also played for the Mexico national baseball team.

== Career ==
=== Early years ===
Sanchez attended Brawley Union High School in Brawley, California, Imperial Valley College, and Iowa Wesleyan University. He was not drafted by a Major League Baseball organization out of college in 2012. He pitched in independent league baseball, playing in the Liga Norte de México and for the Joliet Slammers of the Frontier League.

=== Chicago White Sox ===
On June 10, 2013, Sanchez signed a minor league contract with the Chicago White Sox organization. Sanchez pitched for the Great Falls Voyagers of the Rookie-level Pioneer League, and was named the league's pitcher of the year. In 2014, Sanchez began the season with the Kannapolis Intimidators of the Single–A South Atlantic League.

=== Oakland Athletics ===
On June 14, 2014, the Oakland Athletics traded Michael Taylor for Sanchez, and they assigned him to the Stockton Ports of the High-A California League. In 2015, he pitched for the Midland RockHounds of the Double-A Texas League. He pitched for the Águilas de Mexicali of the Liga Mexicana del Pacífico in 2016–17, also pitching for them in the 2017 Caribbean Series. Sanchez was released by the Athletics organization on August 2, 2018.

=== Toros de Tijuana ===
On August 6, 2018, Sanchez signed with the Toros de Tijuana of the Mexican League. He appeared in 13 games for Tijuana to close out the year, registering a 1–1 record and 4.61 ERA with 8 strikeouts in 13 2/3 innings pitched. In 2019, he pitched in 36 games for Tijuana, logging a 3–3 record and 4.50 ERA with 42 strikeouts and 13 saves in 38 innings of work.

Sanchez did not play in a game in 2020 due to the cancellation of the Mexican League season because of the COVID-19 pandemic. In 2021, Sanchez made 27 appearances for the Toros, working to a 1–1 record and 2.93 ERA with 31 strikeouts in 27 2/3 innings pitched.

=== Sultanes de Monterrey ===
On September 27, 2021, Sanchez, along with IF Daniel Castro and C Victor Ortega, were traded to the Sultanes de Monterrey of the Mexican League. He made 45 appearances for Monterrey in 2022, but struggled to a 7–4 record and 6.05 ERA with 43 strikeouts in 41 2/3 innings pitched.

=== San Diego Padres ===
On February 3, 2023, Sanchez signed a minor league contract with the San Diego Padres organization. In 44 relief outings for the Triple–A El Paso Chihuahuas, he recorded a 5.68 ERA with 62 strikeouts across 57 innings pitched. Sanchez elected free agency following the season on November 6.

=== Diablos Rojos del México ===
On February 17, 2024, Sanchez signed with the Diablos Rojos del México of the Mexican League. In 42 appearances out of the bullpen for the Diablos, he compiled a 5–1 record and 2.38 ERA with 40 strikeouts and 18 saves across 41 2/3 innings pitched. With the team, Sanchez won the Serie del Rey.

=== El Águila de Veracruz ===
On February 7, 2025, Sanchez was traded to El Águila de Veracruz of the Mexican League in exchange for a player to be named later. In 24 appearances out of the bullpen for Veracruz, Sanchez struggled to an 0-3 record and 6.35 ERA with 24 strikeouts and 12 saves across 22 2/3 innings pitched.

=== Saraperos de Saltillo ===
On June 16, 2025, Sanchez was traded to the Saraperos de Saltillo of the Mexican League in exchange for Braulio Torres-Pérez, Cristian Santana, and Ryan Meisinger. In nine appearances for Saltillo, he struggled to an 0-1 record and 16.43 ERA with six strikeouts and two saves over 7 2/3 innings pitched. On July 14, Sanchez was released by the Saraperos.

=== Leones de Yucatán ===
On July 28, 2025, Sanchez signed with the Leones de Yucatán of the Mexican League. In three appearances, he went 1-0 with a 2.25 ERA and three saves in four innings pitched.

Sanchez returned to the team to begin the 2026 season. In 35 relief appearances, he posted a 2-1 record with a 3.23 ERA and 25 strikeouts in 30 2/3 innings pitched.

=== Caliente de Durango ===
On August 4, 2026, Sanchez was traded to the Caliente de Durango of the Mexican League.

== International career ==
Sanchez played for the Mexican national baseball team at the 2017 World Baseball Classic, 2019 exhibition games against Japan, and the 2023 World Baseball Classic.

== Personal life ==
Sanchez holds dual American and Mexican citizenship.
