= Brawley (surname) =

Brawley (/ˈbrɔːli/) is a surname of Scottish, Irish and English origin. In Scotland and Ireland it may derive from the Irish name Ó Brolaigh, which is also anglicised as Brolly and is common in County Londonderry, Northern Ireland. In England it may also derive from the French name de Broglie. Another possible etymology of the name in Scotland connects it with the Scots word braw, meaning fine or handsome and the word lea, meaning a meadow; compare also the Scots word brawlie meaning excellent or in good health.

The name is most common in Scotland, prominently in Strathclyde, excluding Argyll and Bute and Inverclyde.

Notable people with the surname include:

- Benjamin Griffith Brawley (1882–1939), American writer and educator
- Cecile Brawley (1900–1983), American clubwoman
- Ed Brawley (1893–1956), American football player
- Edward M. Brawley (1851–1923), American educator and minister
- Harry Brawley (1876–1954), American athlete
- Joel Brawley, American mathematician
- M. A. Brawley (1850–1922), American politician
- Otis Brawley, American physician
- Robert Brawley (born 1944), American politician
- Robert J. Brawley (1937–2006), American artist
- Ryan Brawley (born 1986), Scottish boxer
- Sean Brawley (born 1960), American tennis player
- Susan Brawley, American marine ecologist
- Tawana Brawley, a black 15-year-old female who falsely claimed to have been raped by six white men
- Wendy Brawley (born 1958), American politician
- William Brawley (disambiguation)
