= Sergio Romo =

American baseball player (born 1983)

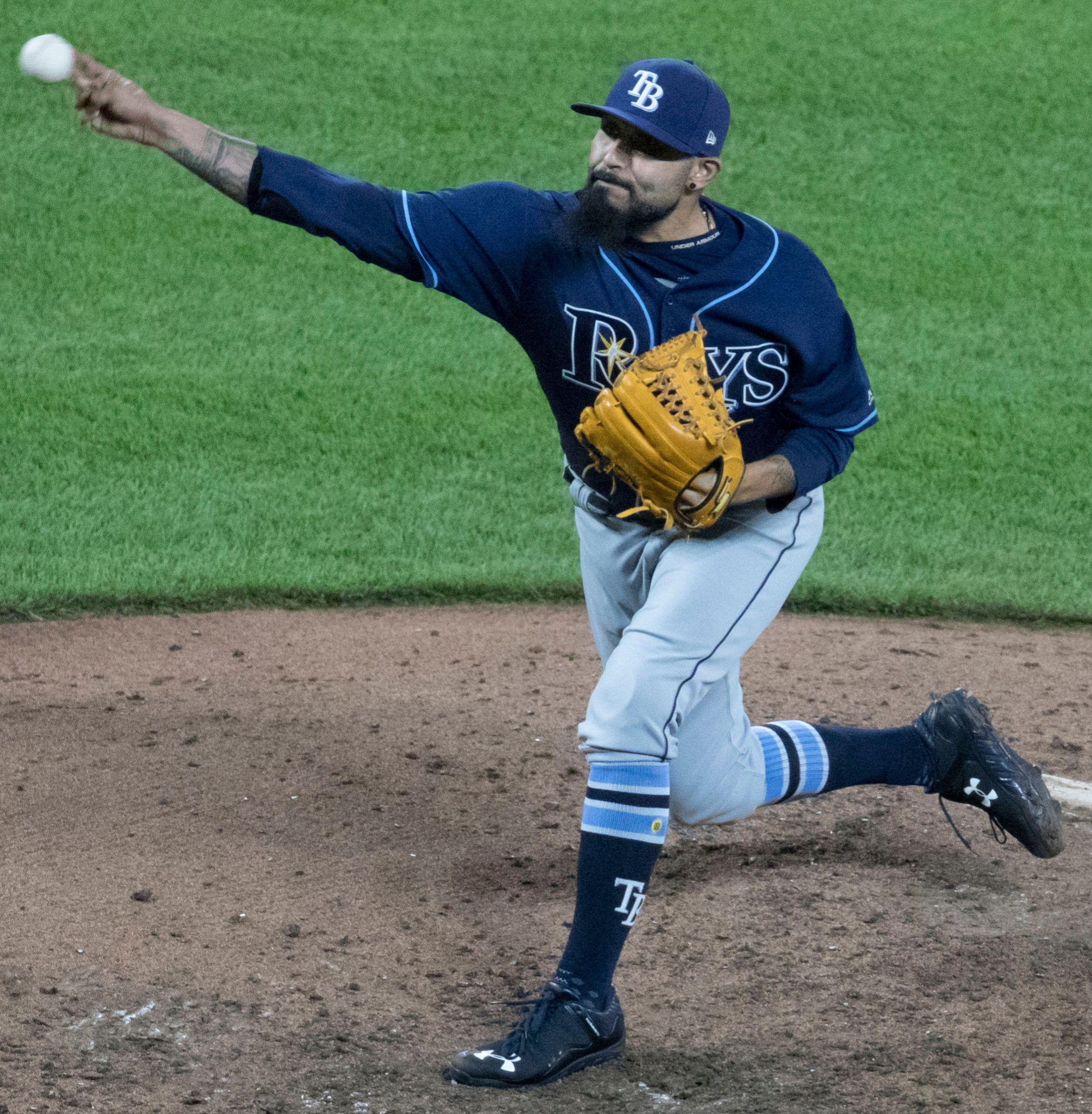
- Romo with the Tampa Bay Rays in 2017
- Pitcher
- Born: March 4, 1983 (age 43); Brawley, California, U.S.
- Batted: Right Threw: Right

MLB debut
- June 26, 2008, for the San Francisco Giants

Last MLB appearance
- July 14, 2022, for the Toronto Blue Jays

MLB statistics
- Win–loss record: 42–36
- Earned run average: 3.21
- Strikeouts: 789
- Saves: 137
- Stats at Baseball Reference

Teams
- San Francisco Giants (2008–2016); Los Angeles Dodgers (2017); Tampa Bay Rays (2017–2018); Miami Marlins (2019); Minnesota Twins (2019–2020); Oakland Athletics (2021); Seattle Mariners (2022); Toronto Blue Jays (2022)

Career highlights and awards
- All-Star (2013); 3× World Series champion (2010, 2012, 2014); San Francisco Giants Wall of Fame

Sergio Francisco Romo (born March 4, 1983) is an American former professional baseball pitcher. He played in Major League Baseball (MLB) for the San Francisco Giants, Los Angeles Dodgers, Tampa Bay Rays, Miami Marlins, Minnesota Twins, Oakland Athletics, Seattle Mariners, and Toronto Blue Jays. A right-hander who served as a closer during his career, his main pitch was his slider.

Born in Brawley, California, Romo grew up a Dodgers fan. He attended four colleges, getting drafted in the 28th round of the 2005 draft by the Giants. He reached the major leagues in 2008 and appeared in 45 games for the Giants in 2009. In 2010, he became the setup man for Giants closer Brian Wilson as the Giants won the 2010 World Series. He posted a 1.50 earned run average (ERA) in 2011, then became the closer for the Giants in 2012, recording three saves during the 2012 World Series as the Giants won the title. He was an All-Star in 2013, and though he lost the closer role the next year, he won his third World Series ring as the Giants defeated the Kansas City Royals in the 2014 World Series.

After two more seasons with the Giants, Romo signed with the Dodgers for 2017. He was designated for assignment in 2018 and traded to the Rays. In 2018, he was the first pitcher used by Rays manager Kevin Cash as part of Tampa's opener strategy. Later that year, he became Tampa Bay's closer. A free agent after the season, he signed with the Marlins and served as Miami's closer until getting traded to the Twins halfway through the year. He reached the playoffs with Minnesota in 2019 and 2020 before becoming a free agent once again.

== Early life ==
Romo was born in Brawley, California to parents of Mexican heritage. He grew up a Los Angeles Dodgers fan. His grandfather and father both played baseball; his grandfather was a member of the Mexico City Diablos Rojos. Work responsibilities kept Frank, a semipro player, from being able to play Minor League Baseball, and he wanted to make sure his son got the opportunity. He built Sergio a pitching mound in the backyard and taught him how to throw. Romo played shortstop and third base on the baseball team at Brawley Union High School, graduating in 2001. With no scholarship offers from four-year colleges, Romo nearly signed enlistment papers to follow his father in the United States Navy, but he opted to play baseball at junior college instead.

== College career ==
Romo went to Orange Coast College before transferring to Arizona Western College. Romo was named to the All-Region I second team of the Arizona Community College Athletic Conference in 2002 and 2003. In 159 innings, Romo earned a 16-4 overall record with a 2.79 earned run average (ERA).

For his junior and senior years, Romo played NCAA Division II baseball at two colleges: the University of North Alabama (2004) and Mesa State College (2005). He was named First-Team All-Gulf South Conference in 2004 while playing for North Alabama and was 10–3 with a 3.69 ERA in 97.1 innings. In his senior year with Mesa State, he was the Rocky Mountain Athletic Conference Pitcher of the Year.

== Professional career ==
=== Draft and minor leagues ===
Romo was drafted by the San Francisco Giants in the 28th round (852nd overall) of the 2005 Major League Baseball (MLB) draft. He began his professional career with the Salem-Keizer Volcanoes of the Single-A short season Northwest League. Used as a starter, he had a 7–1 record and a 2.75 ERA in 68 2/3 innings. His seven wins led the Northwest League, while his 65 strikeouts ranked ninth.

The following year, Romo was assigned to the Augusta GreenJackets of the Single-A South Atlantic League. In 31 games (10 starts) he had a 10–2 record, a 2.53 ERA, 95 strikeouts, and four saves in 103 1/3 innings. He made 41 relief appearances for the San Jose Giants of the Single-A advanced California League in 2007, compiling a 6–2 record, a 1.36 ERA, 106 strikeouts, and nine saves in 66 1/3 innings of work. Romo's 14.38 strikeouts per 9 innings pitched was the fourth-best mark in the minors, and milb.com named Romo the High–A Relief Pitcher of the Year. Aided by his contributions, San Jose won the California League championship.

Romo began the 2008 season with the Double-A Connecticut Defenders of the Eastern League. Used as the closer, he had 11 saves in 27 games, and his ERA was 4.00.

=== San Francisco Giants (2008–2016) ===
==== 2008 ====
Romo had his contract purchased by the San Francisco Giants on June 24, 2008, when Vinnie Chulk was designated for assignment. He made his big league debut on June 26, 2008, in a 4–1 loss to the Cleveland Indians, striking out two in an inning pitched. Romo posted a 2.35 ERA in his first 15 games but was designated for assignment on August 6, because the Giants were adding up two relief pitchers. Romo was on trade waivers at the time and thus could not be optioned to the minors. He was eventually sent to the minors, but was recalled on August 16, when Jonathan Sánchez was placed on the disabled list. Romo replaced Matt Palmer in the bullpen as Palmer took Sánchez's rotation spot. In 29 games as a rookie, Romo had a 3–1 record, a 2.12 ERA, 33 strikeouts, and eight walks in 34 innings. He played winter baseball with the Águilas de Mexicali of the Mexican Pacific League. In 15 relief appearances, Romo made six saves and posted a 2.70 ERA.

==== 2009 ====
A right elbow sprain caused Romo to start the 2009 season on the disabled list, but he was activated on May 30, 2009. From June 5 through June 20, he threw 7 2/3 scoreless innings, allowing just two hits. He picked up wins on both June 19 and 20, against the Texas Rangers. He completed his first major league save on July 7 against the Florida Marlins. He got the last two outs of the game, both of which were via the strikeout. Romo had a 2.31 ERA through July 11, but in four games between July 11 and 20, he gave up seven runs in two innings, raising his ERA to 6.59. He then had a 2.21 ERA in his final 27 games, which brought his ERA down to 3.97 at the end of the year. In 45 games, he had a 5–2 record, 41 strikeouts, and 11 walks in 34 innings. He was one of eight NL relievers to allow one or fewer home runs. Romo also stranded 92.9% of inherited runners, second in the NL to Juan Rincón's 95%.

==== 2010 ====
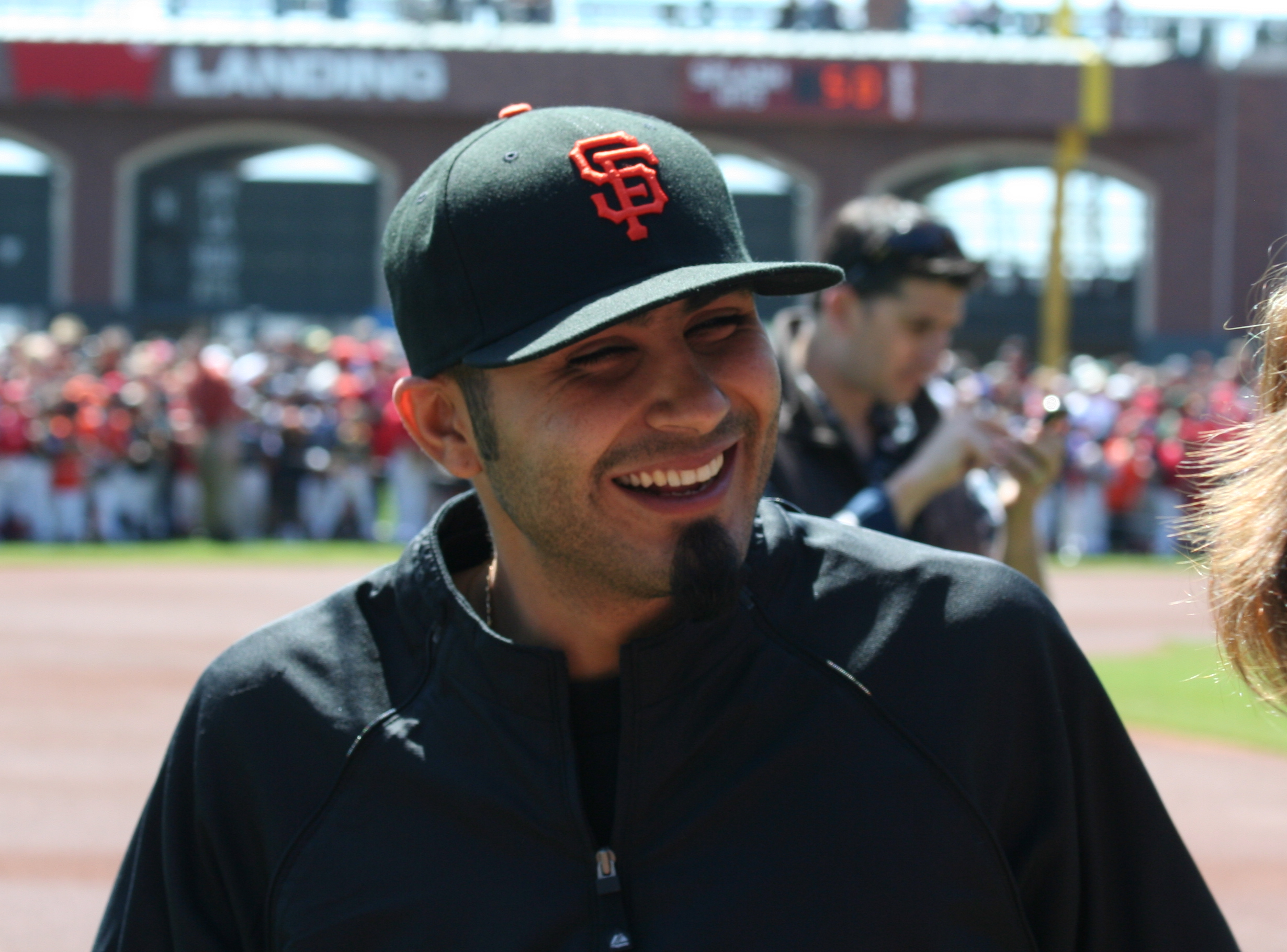
Romo with the San Francisco Giants in 2010

Romo got off to a tough start in the 2010 season, posting a 4.50 ERA through his first 14 games and losing three of them. Starting May 9, he posted a 1.50 ERA in his final 54 games of the year. In mid-June, Giants' manager Bruce Bochy removed the struggling Guillermo Mota from the setup role and replaced him with Romo, who held it for the rest of the regular season. Romo gained notoriety for being one of the team's relief pitchers with a prominent beard, along with LHP Jeremy Affeldt and closer Brian Wilson. In 68 games (second to Wilson on the Giants), Romo had a 5–3 record, a 2.18 ERA, 70 strikeouts, and 14 walks in 62 innings. This year, he held right-handed batters to a .185 average. His 5.00 strikeout-to-walk ratio ranked sixth among NL relievers, and his 2.18 ERA ranked 10th.

In Game 2 of the National League Division Series (NLDS) against the Atlanta Braves, Romo gave up two hits without recording an out; both runners scored as the Giants went on to blow a three-run lead and lose 5–4 in 11 innings. Romo replaced Sánchez in the eighth inning of Game 3 and allowed a go-ahead two-run home run to Eric Hinske but was charged with the win as the Giants rallied in the ninth to win 3–2. The Giants won the series in four games. In Game 4 of the NL Championship Series (NLCS) against the Philadelphia Phillies, Romo gave up an RBI double to Jayson Werth and was charged with a blown save, but the Giants won 6–5. He held the Phillies scoreless in his other two outings of the series (losses in Games 2 and 5), and the Giants won the series in six games. Romo made one appearance in the World Series against the Texas Rangers, throwing 2/3 of a scoreless eighth inning in the Giants' 11–7 Game 1 victory. Romo earned his first World Series ring as the Giants won the series in five games to win their first title since 1954.

==== 2011 ====
In 2011, Romo became the fifth reliever in MLB history to throw nine or more consecutive perfect innings, retiring thirty straight batters in 10 innings over a span of fourteen games from July 4 through August 6. From August 16 through August 28, he was on the disabled list with right elbow inflammation. From June 30 through September 23, he had the longest scoreless streak of his career, throwing 21 2/3 scoreless innings. Romo appeared in 65 games in 2011; his stat line for the year was: 3–1 record, 1.50 ERA, 70 strikeouts, five walks, 13.1 K/9, and .9 BB/9 in 48 innings. His ERA was the third-lowest among NL relievers, and his strikeout-to-walk ratio of 14:1 was the best in MLB and the best ever since Dennis Eckersley's 18.25:1 ratio in 1990. He stranded 81.8% of runners (fifth in the NL) and trailed only Kris Medlen in strike percentage (71%) among NL pitchers with at least 20 innings pitched.

==== 2012 ====
Romo performed very well to begin the 2012 season and did not allow an earned run until May 17, 2012. After Brian Wilson underwent Tommy John surgery in April, Santiago Casilla was given the closer role. Casilla converted 20 of his first 21 save opportunities but blew five of his next nine save situations, posting a 7.71 ERA from June 23 through August 7. Bochy announced on August 7 that the Giants would use a "bullpen by committee" strategy, with Romo, Javier López, and Jeremy Affeldt pitching the final two innings of close games, depending on which hitters they would be facing. Romo and López received most of the save opportunities; Affeldt only had one save after that point. From then through the end of the season, Romo converted nine out of nine save opportunities and posted a 1.33 ERA. Romo appeared in 69 games of the 2012 season, earning 14 saves with a 1.79 ERA, which was fourth among NL relievers and trailed only Craig Kimbrel (1.01), Aroldis Chapman (1.51) and Eric O'Flaherty (1.73). Though he had become the closer by the end of the year, he won the Gibby Award for being MLB's Setup Man of the Year. The Giants won the NL West; in the NLDS against the Cincinnati Reds, Romo appeared in three games, winning Game 3 and saving Game 5. In October 11 at Great American Ball Park, in Game 5 of the NLDS and with the Giants leading 6–4, Romo won a 12-pitch at-bat against right fielder Jay Bruce, getting him to flyout to Xavier Nady in left field. He pitched in all four of the Giants' wins in the NLCS against the St. Louis Cardinals but did not get a single save opportunity. However, in the World Series against the Detroit Tigers, he made three appearances and recorded the save in each of them. He pitched the final inning of the deciding Game 4 and struck out three straight, including that year's Triple Crown winner and American League MVP Miguel Cabrera with a slider looking for the last out and the Giants' win. In the World Series, Romo pitched three perfect innings and had five strikeouts.

==== 2013 ====
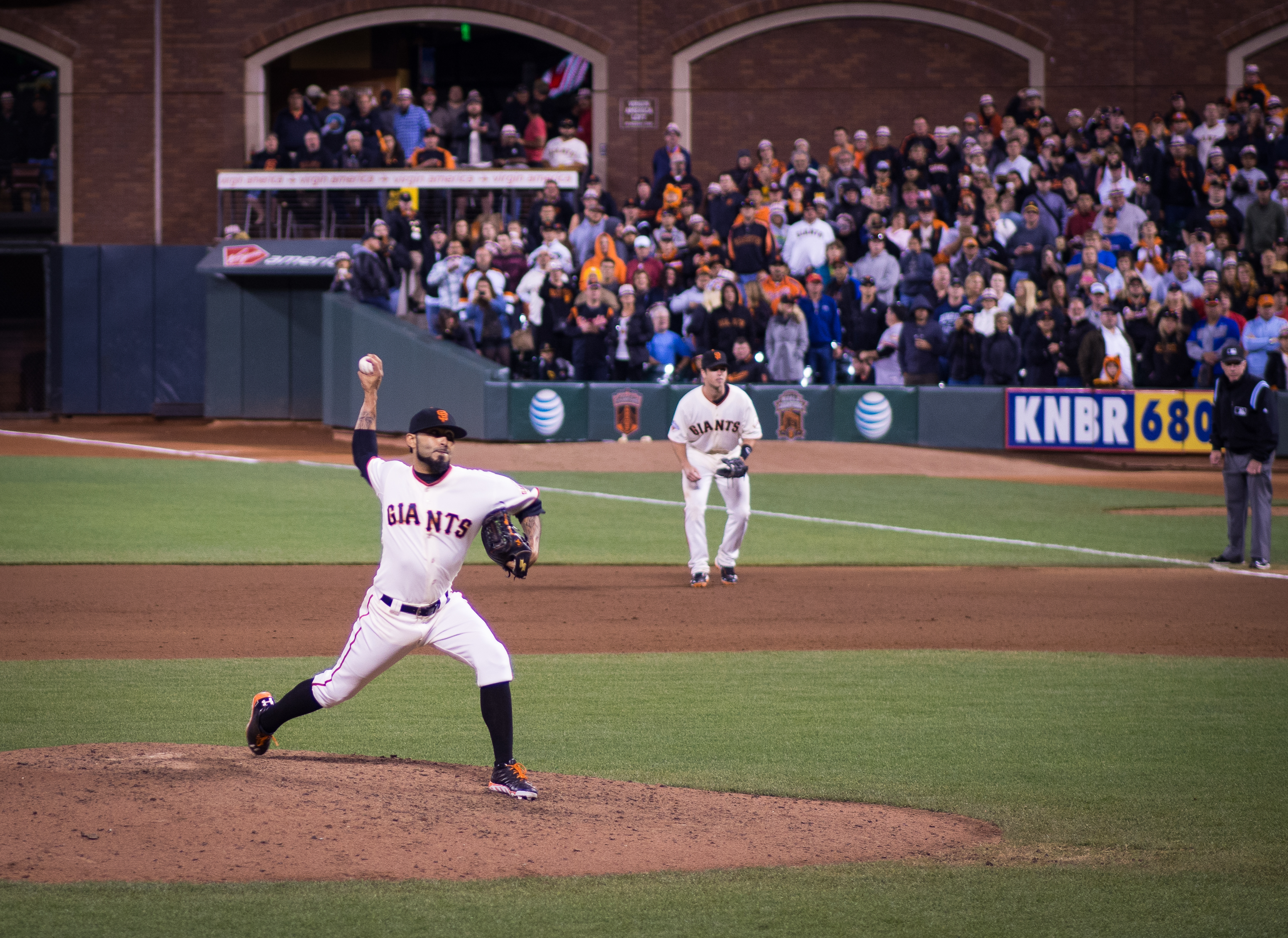
Romo pitching for the Giants in 2013

In February 2013, Romo and the Giants agreed to a two-year, $9 million contract. Romo began the 2013 season as the Giants' closer. He had 10 saves in April, second in Giants' history for the month to Rod Beck (11). On July 14, he was added to the NL All Star Game roster after Jeff Locke and Jordan Zimmermann made starts on Sunday and became ineligible to pitch. It was the first All-Star selection of his career. However, Romo was not used in the All-Star Game. In August, Romo converted all nine of his save opportunities. Romo finished the 2013 season with a 2.54 earned run average and 38 saves in 43 chances, appearing in 65 games. He had a career-high five wins but also a career-high eight losses. His 38 saves made him the sixth Giant to achieve 30 saves in a season and tied him for third in the league with Chapman, behind Kimbrel's 50 and Rafael Soriano's 43.

==== 2014 ====
Romo began the 2014 season well, with a 1.65 ERA and 12 saves through May 9. However, Romo struggled after that, recording five blown saves and a 9.00 ERA from May 9 to June 30. Romo was removed from the closer role on that date, with the Giants announcing their intention to go to a closer-by-committee. Used as the eighth inning setup man for the remainder of the season, Romo appeared 30 times after July 1 and had a 2.10 ERA over 25 2/3 innings with 32 strikeouts and 5 walks. He finished the year 6–4 with a 3.72 ERA, 59 strikeouts in 58 innings, and 12 walks over 64 games. In save opportunities, he was 23 for 28. In the 2014 NLDS against the Washington Nationals, Romo pitched three scoreless innings over three games. He took the loss in Game 2 of the NLCS against the Cardinals after allowing a game-ending home run to Kolten Wong. He recovered to earn the win in Game 3 by retiring Matt Holliday as the Giants won in extra innings. In the 2014 World Series, Romo appeared in two games, pitching 2 1/3 innings with four strikeouts and no runs allowed, earning his third World Series championship with the Giants. On December 22, 2014, Romo and the Giants finalized a two-year contract worth $15 million.

==== 2015 ====
He spent the 2015 season serving as the eighth-inning setup man for Casilla, who had reclaimed the closer role. After posting a 5.19 ERA before the All-Star break, Romo posted a 1.15 ERA in the second half of the season. He did not allow a run over 14 innings between July 11 and August 21. On August 18, he struck out all three batters he faced in the eighth inning of a 2–0 win over the Cardinals. In 70 games, he had an 0–5 record, two saves, a 2.98 ERA, and 71 strikeouts in 57 1/3 innings pitched.

==== 2016 ====
Romo pitched in a mere four games in 2016 before being placed on the disabled list on April 15 (retroactive to April 11) with a strained right flexor tendon. Though he went on a rehab assignment in late May, there were setbacks in his recovery, and he was not activated from the disabled list until July 4. On August 30, at AT&T Park, Romo pitched in his 500th career game, a 4–3 loss to the Arizona Diamondbacks. On September 19, Bochy removed the struggling Casilla from the closer role. Though he listed Hunter Strickland and Derek Law as the pitchers most likely to get save opportunities, Romo would be the one picking up the save in four of the Giants final 12 games. In 40 games, he had a 1–0 record, four saves, a 2.64 ERA, and 33 strikeouts in 30 2/3 innings. The Giants reached the playoffs for the fourth time in Romo's tenure with them, winning the NL Wild Card Game against the New York Mets. With the Giants leading Game 3 of the NLDS against the Chicago Cubs by a score of 5–3, Romo was called on to get the save in the ninth inning. He walked Dexter Fowler to lead off the inning, then gave up a game-tying home run to Kris Bryant. However, the Giants ultimately won 6–5 in 13 innings. In Game 4, he relieved López with two runners on in the ninth and nobody out. Ben Zobrist had an RBI double against him, and Romo was replaced on the mound by Will Smith. Zobrist later scored, and the Cubs rallied from three runs down to win 6–5, eliminating the Giants from the playoffs. After the season, Romo became a free agent.

=== Los Angeles Dodgers (2017) ===
On February 15, 2017, Romo signed a one-year, $3 million, contract with the Los Angeles Dodgers. "In talking to Sergio, last year we had one of best bullpens in baseball and that lends itself to unselfishness," manager Dave Roberts said of the signing. "Sergio definitely is up for that. A lot of times the eighth inning, but he's up for anything." In 30 games for the Dodgers, he posted a 6.12 ERA in 25 innings before getting designated for assignment on July 20.

=== Tampa Bay Rays (2017–2018) ===
On July 22, 2017, the Dodgers traded Romo to the Tampa Bay Rays for cash considerations or a player to be named later (PTBNL). He spent the rest of the season in Tampa Bay's bullpen, posting a 2–0 record and a 1.47 ERA in 25 games. In 55 games combined between Los Angeles and Tampa Bay, he had a 3–1 record, no saves, a 3.56 ERA, and 59 strikeouts in 55 2/3 innings pitched. After the season, he became a free agent.

Romo re-signed with the Rays on a one-year, $2.5 million, contract on February 13, 2018. That season, Rays manager Kevin Cash decided to experiment with using an opener, a pitcher designated to pitch the first one to three innings at the beginning of a ballgame. The rationale for the move was that starting pitchers tend to be less effective the third time they face batters. Instead, having a relief pitcher start the game will allow the regular starter (or "bulk guy") to enter later and reach later innings without having to face as many hitters. After 588 major league relief appearances, Romo was the first pitcher utilized in this role, as he made his first career start on May 19, 2018. He pitched one scoreless inning against the Los Angeles Angels, striking out the side before getting replaced by Ryan Yarbrough in an eventual 5–3 victory. He started again the next day, pitching 1 1/3 scoreless innings in a 5–2 loss. This made Romo the first pitcher since Zack Greinke in 2012 to start consecutive games. He went on to make three more starts on May 25, May 27, and June 1, reaching the second inning in only the last of those three. However, in June, the Rays began using him as their closer, as Álex Colomé, who had started the year in that role, had been traded on May 25. Romo would serve as the closer the rest of the year. On July 25, after he recorded the last two outs of the eighth inning, he was moved to third base to start the ninth so left-hander Jonny Venters could pitch to left-hander Greg Bird. After Venters retired Bird, Romo returned to the mound, retiring the last two hitters to record the save. During a 13-game stretch from August 9 through September 17, he converted nine consecutive save opportunities and posted a 1.54 ERA. In the midst of that stretch, on August 19, Romo recorded his 100th career save in a 2–0 victory over the Boston Red Sox. For the season, Romo appeared in a career-high 73 games, fourth in the American League (AL), while making a career-high five starts. He had a 3–4 record, a 4.14 ERA, and 25 saves over 33 opportunities. In 67 1/3 innings, he struck out 75. After the season, he became a free agent.

=== Miami Marlins (2019) ===
On February 12, 2019, Romo signed a one-year, $2.5 million deal with the Miami Marlins. He served as the closer up until late July, recording 17 saves in 38 appearances. Romo only blew one save for the Marlins all season, converting his first seven chances and his last 10 chances with the team. On May 17, he entered a game against the Mets with the bases loaded, no outs in the eighth, and the Marlins up 8–4. He allowed two inherited runners to score that inning but did not allow a run himself. Then, he pitched a scoreless ninth, earning the save in the 8–6 victory. Through July 27, he had a 2–0 record, a 3.58 ERA, and 33 strikeouts in 37 2/3 innings pitched for Miami. That day, the Marlins traded Romo, Chris Vallimont, and a PTBNL to the Minnesota Twins in exchange for Lewin Díaz.

=== Minnesota Twins (2019–2020) ===
Upon joining the Twins, Romo became the setup man for Twins closer Taylor Rogers. On August 27, he struck out all three men he faced in the eighth inning of a 3–1 victory over the Chicago White Sox. In 27 games for Minnesota, he had an 0–1 record, three saves in five chances, a 3.18 ERA, and 27 strikeouts in 22 2/3 innings. He appeared in a total of 65 games between Miami and Minnesota, compiling a 2–1 record, a 3.43 ERA, 20 saves in 23 chances, and 60 strikeouts in 60 1/3 innings.

Romo helped the Twins reach the playoffs as they won the AL Central title in 2019. In Game 2 of the ALDS, he got the first two outs of the eighth inning without surrendering a run; however, the Twins lost to the New York Yankees by a score of 8–2. Entering Game 3 with the Twins down 3–1 in the eighth inning, he threw a scoreless eighth but allowed two runs in the ninth as the Yankees won 5–1, completing a series sweep of the Twins. After the season, Romo became a free agent.

On December 16, 2019, Romo elected to return to the Twins for the 2020 season, signing a 1-year, $5 million deal with a team option for 2021. The 2020 MLB season did not start until July 24 due to the COVID-19 situation. He again served as the setup man for Rogers, though Twins manager Rocco Baldelli occasionally used him in the ninth instead, as Rogers struggled to repeat his success from 2019. In a 3–1 win over the Cleveland Indians on September 11, Romo retired Francisco Lindor on a fly ball to end the eighth inning. As he walked back towards his dugout, he and Lindor began yelling at each other. The benches cleared, though no punches were thrown, and Romo was suspended one game by MLB the next day for his role in the incident. "This is a situation that’s been brewing for a while," Sandy Alomar Jr., the Indians manager, told reporters. "I mean, Romo likes to dish it. Our guys dish it back. The whole thing about this situation -- Romo’s been animated all his career and he’s been in the National League. We don’t know much about him. That’s all it is. If he’s gonna dish it, we dish it back and you have to take it. That’s the bottom line." In 2020, Romo appeared in 24 games, compiling a 1–2 record with 4.05 ERA and 23 strikeouts in 20 innings pitched. He recorded five saves in six opportunities.

For the second year in a row, Romo reached the playoffs as the Twins clinched the AL Central title. In Game 1 of the AL Wild Card Series against the Houston Astros, he relieved Rogers to start the ninth inning with the game tied by a score of 1–1. He gave up two hits before retiring the next two batters. Then, George Springer hit into what should have been a force play at second base, but Jorge Polanco's throw to second base was too far off the bag, and the error allowed Springer to reach safely. Romo then walked Jose Altuve to force in a run before getting replaced on the mound by Caleb Thielbar, who gave up a two-run single to Michael Brantley. None of the runs were earned, but Romo was charged with the loss in the 4–1 defeat. The Astros eliminated the Twins with a win in Game 2. On October 28, the Twins declined to exercise their $5 million option on Romo's contract for the 2021 season, giving him a $250,000 buyout and making him a free agent.

=== Oakland Athletics (2021) ===
On February 14, 2021, Romo signed a one-year, $2.25 million contract with the Oakland Athletics. Romo made 66 appearances throughout the 2021 season for Oakland. Romo went 1–1 with a 4.67 ERA and 60 strikeouts. Romo elected free agency following the season.

=== Seattle Mariners (2022) ===
On March 24, 2022, Romo signed a one-year, $2 million contract with the Seattle Mariners. Romo made 17 appearances for Seattle, struggling to a 8.16 ERA with 11 strikeouts in 14.1 innings pitched. He was designated for assignment on June 20, and released on June 22.

=== Toronto Blue Jays (2022) ===
On June 29, 2022, Romo signed a one-year, $700K contract with the Toronto Blue Jays. Romo appeared in 6 games for Toronto, surrendering 3 runs (2 earned) on 1 hit and 2 walks in 3.2 innings pitched. He was designated for assignment on July 16. On July 20, Romo cleared waivers and was sent outright to the Triple-A Buffalo Bisons, but rejected the assignment and elected free agency that same day.

=== Acereros de Monclova (2022) ===
On August 1, 2022, Romo signed with the Acereros de Monclova of the Mexican League. He made two appearances for Monclova down the stretch, posting two scoreless innings of work.

=== San Francisco Giants (second stint) ===
On March 16, 2023, Romo signed a minor league contract with the San Francisco Giants organization, with the intention to retire as a Giant after pitching one final time in the March 27 Bay Bridge exhibition game against the Oakland Athletics.

== Career overall ==
=== Statistics and achievements ===
Category	W	L	ERA	G	GS	CG	SHO	SV	IP	H	R	ER	HR	BB	IBB	SO	HBP	ERA+	FIP	WHIP	H/9	SO/9	Ref.
Total	42	36	3.21	821	5	0	0	137	722 2/3	579	275	258	85	179	21	789	27	123	3.33	1.049	7.2	9.8	

== Broadcasting career ==
Shortly after retiring, Romo became a postgame analyst on NBC Sports Bay Area.

== International play ==
By virtue of his Mexican heritage, Romo has represented Mexico in international play. In the 2013 World Baseball Classic, he posted a 9.00 ERA, losing a game but also earning a save. Mexico failed to advance past the first round. In 2017, Romo was excited about Mexico's chances in the classic. "This team is well put together. I do honestly believe that this is one of the strongest teams that Mexico has ever put forth in any kind of tournament and any kind of situation. Not just from a pitching standpoint, but our lineup has a lot of power and guys that can run a little bit. I see us playing a more well-rounded brand of baseball. With all due respect to all of the other teams, don't sleep on us." However, Mexico again failed to advance past the first round. Romo posted a 20.25 ERA in that tournament.

Romo also represented Mexico in the 2017 Caribbean Series, appearing in one game. Next season, he appeared in three games for Mexico in the 2018 Caribbean Series. Following the 2016, 2017, and 2018 MLB seasons, Romo played for the Charros de Jalisco of the Mexican Pacific League.

== Pitches ==
With a sidearm delivery, Romo features four pitches: an unusual "No Dot" slider, a four-seam fastball, a sinker, and a changeup. Before 2011, the fastball was his main pitch, as is the case with most pitchers. However, ex-teammate Bengie Molina encouraged Romo to have more confidence in his slider after facing him in the 2010 World Series. Romo began to throw the slider a majority of the time, and since 2011, fastballs have been less than 40 percent of his pitches. The pitch is called a "No Dot" slider, because, unlike most pitchers' sliders, it does not spin on an axis centered on the seams. This means that it creates no red dot at its center for hitters to track as it comes to the plate. Its sweep motion makes it particularly tricky for right-handed hitters to hit. In 2017, he threw a slider 58.4% of the time, the most among major league pitchers. The fastball, never harder than 93 mph, averaged closer to 87 mph as of 2015. Meanwhile, the slider averages 78 mph.

For most of his career, Romo has struggled against left-handed batters. After experimenting with using his changeup on them in 2014, he decided to try throwing a harder, faster slider to them in 2015. Since then, he has returned to trying to get them out with the changeup.

== Personal life ==
Romo married his now ex-wife Chelsea before he reached the major leagues. The couple had their first child, a boy named Rilen, in January 2006. Their second son, Rex was born in September 2011 and their third son Rhys in August 2015.

Romo has a number of tattoos and estimates that he has spent approximately 60 hours in tattoo parlors in his life.
