= Brawley Union High School District =

School district in California, United States

Brawley Union High School Dist

Location
- 480 North Imperial Ave. Brawley, CA 92227 United States

Other information
- Website: www.brawleyhigh.org

Brawley Union High School District is a public school district based in Brawley, Imperial County, California.

It serves a section of the Imperial Valley in the Colorado Desert of Southern California.

== Schools ==
- Brawley Union High School
- Desert Valley High School
