= William Cawley (disambiguation) =

William Cawley (1602–1667) was an English politician.

William Cawley may also refer to:

- William Cawley (younger) (born c. 1628), English lawyer and politician, and son of William Cawley (1602–1667)
- Will Cawley (born 1997), English boxer

== See also ==
- William Crawley (disambiguation)
- William Calley
- Bill Cowley
