= Mike Mohamed =

American football player (born 1988)

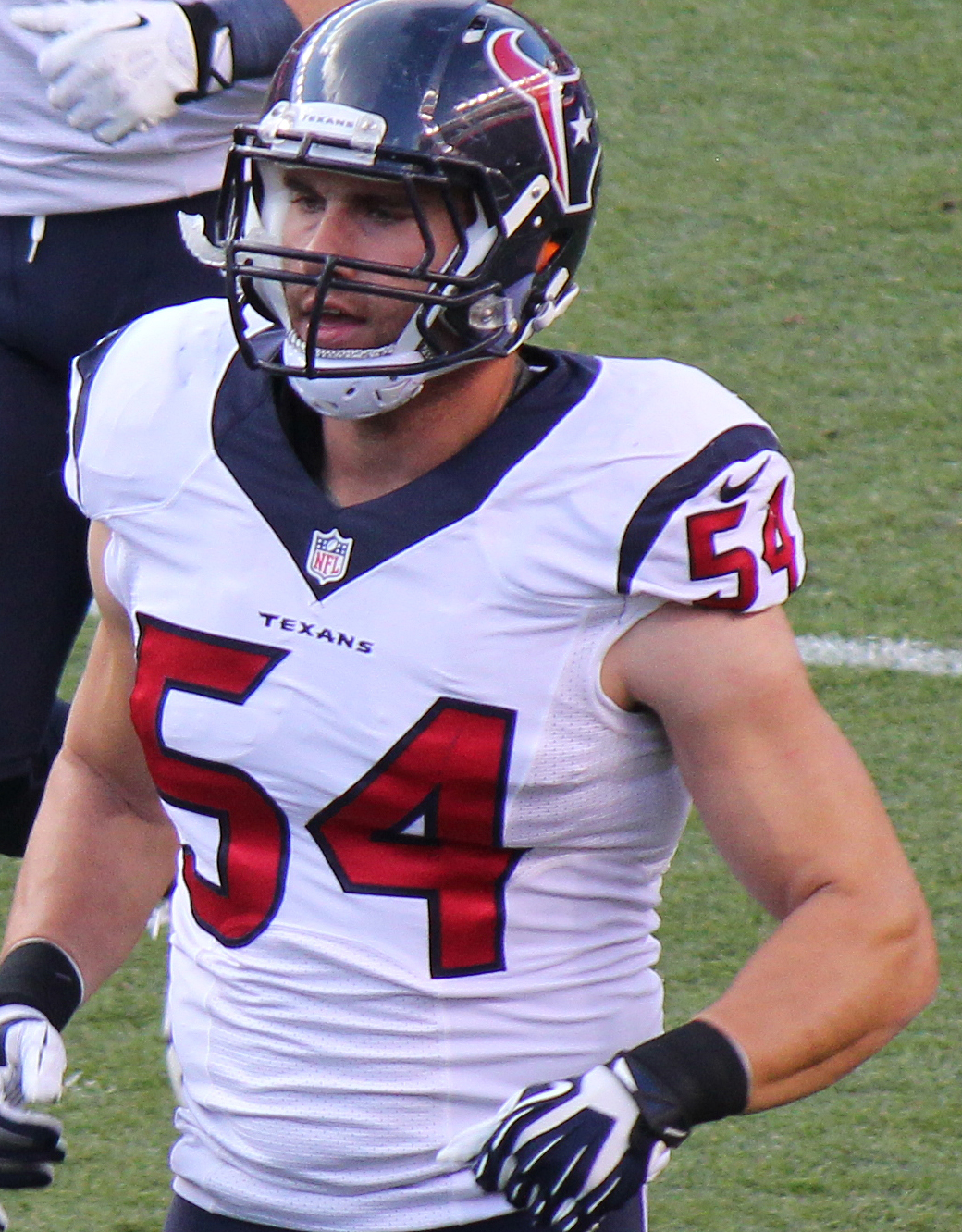
- Mohamed with the Houston Texans in 2014

No. 53, 47, 90, 54, 98
- Position: Linebacker

Personal information
- Born: March 11, 1988 (age 38); Brawley, California, U.S.
- Listed height: 6 ft 3 in (1.91 m)
- Listed weight: 238 lb (108 kg)

Career information
- High school: Brawley Union
- College: California
- NFL draft: 2011: 6th round, 189th overall pick

Career history
- Denver Broncos (2011); Jacksonville Jaguars (2012)*; Denver Broncos (2012); Tennessee Titans (2012)*; Houston Texans (2013–2015); New Orleans Saints (2015)
- * Offseason or practice squad member only

Awards and highlights
- First-team All-Pac-10 (2009); Second-team All-Pac-10 (2010)

Career NFL statistics
- Total tackles: 72
- Interceptions: 1
- Stats at Pro Football Reference

Michael Patrick Mohamed (born March 11, 1988) is an American former professional football player who was a linebacker in the National Football League (NFL). He was selected by the Denver Broncos in the sixth round of the 2011 NFL draft. He played college football for the California Golden Bears. Mohamed is the first player of Punjabi descent in NFL history.

He was also a member of the Jacksonville Jaguars, Tennessee Titans, Houston Texans, and New Orleans Saints.

== Professional career ==
Pre-draft measurables
Height	Weight	Arm length	Hand span	Wingspan	40-yard dash	10-yard split	20-yard split	20-yard shuttle	Three-cone drill	Vertical jump	Broad jump	Bench press
6 ft 3 in (1.91 m)	239 lb (108 kg)	33 in (0.84 m)	9 1/2 in (0.24 m)	6 ft 6 1/2 in (1.99 m)	4.79 s	1.69 s	2.78 s	4.00 s	6.70 s	32.0 in (0.81 m)	9 ft 7 in (2.92 m)	21 reps
All values from 2011 NFL Scouting Combine

=== Denver Broncos ===
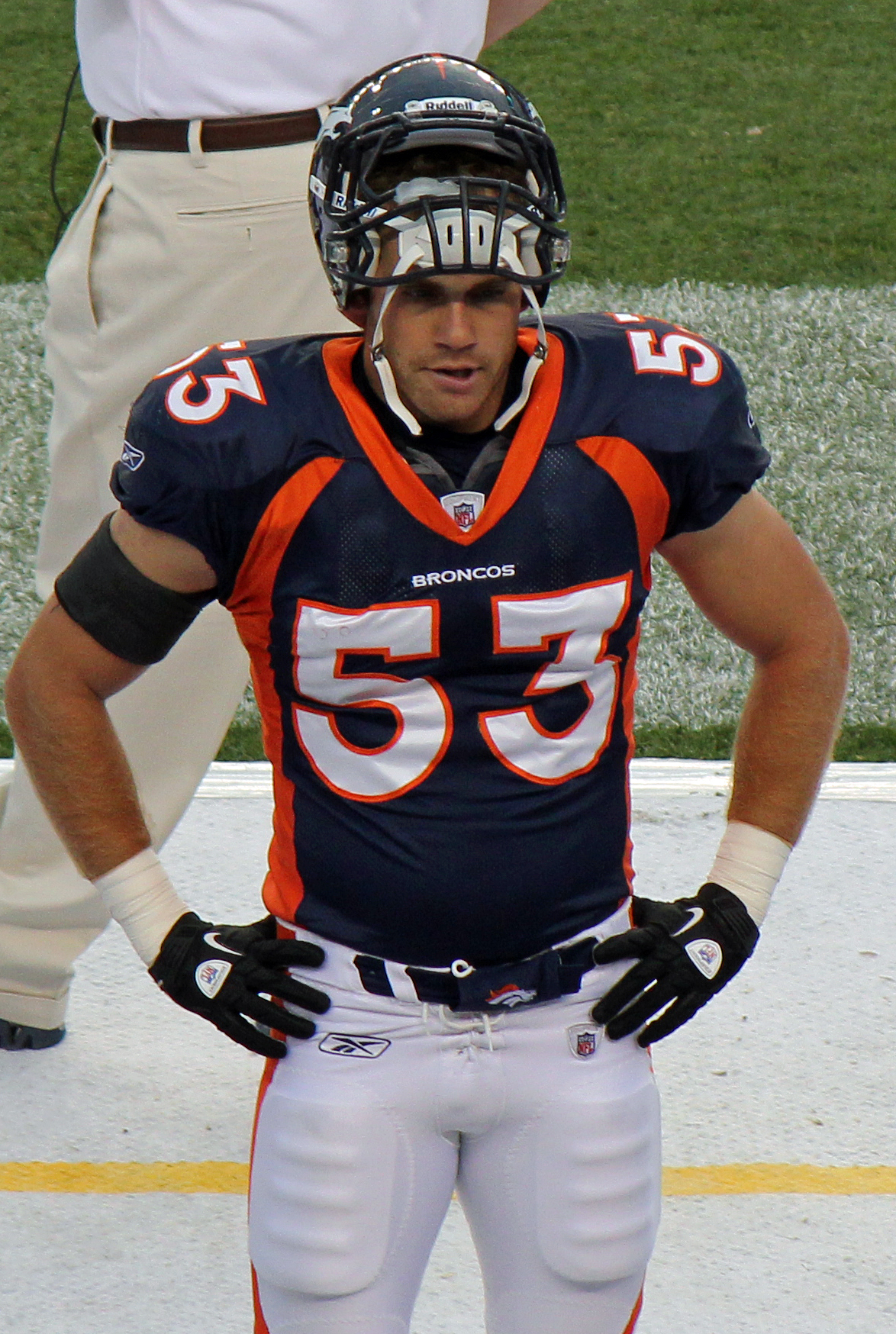
Mohamed with the Broncos in 2011

Mohamed was selected with the 24th pick of the sixth round, 189th overall, by the Denver Broncos in the 2011 NFL draft. He was released by the Denver Broncos on September 22, 2011, but was signed to the practice squad the next day. He was signed back to the active roster on November 29.

He was signed back on to the practice squad on October 2, 2012 and released again.

=== Jacksonville Jaguars ===
Mohamed was signed to the Jacksonville Jaguars' practice squad on September 13, 2012. On September 26, 2012, he was released from the practice squad.

=== Houston Texans ===
Mohamed signed a future contract with the Houston Texans on January 25, 2013.

During week 11 of the 2014 season, Mohamed intercepted a tipped pass thrown by Brian Hoyer of the Cleveland Browns.

=== New Orleans Saints ===
Mohamed signed a contract with the New Orleans Saints on November 4, 2015. He was waived by the Saints on November 10, 2015.

== Personal life ==
He has Punjabi Mexican American ancestry from his great grandfather, an immigrant from Punjab who settled in California in the 1900s.

As of 2024, Mohamed works with Solomon Partners.
