= Salomon's House =

Fictional institution

Salomon's House (or Solomon's House) is a fictional institution in Sir Francis Bacon's utopian work New Atlantis, published in English in 1627, after Bacon's death. In this work, Bacon portrays a vision of the future of human discovery and knowledge. Salomon's House is credited with being the standard upon which 17th century scientific academies, including the French Académie des Sciences and the English Royal Society, are based.

== Historical context ==
It is speculated that Bacon was inspired by contemporary men of science Cornelis Drebbel and Salomon de Caus, as well as author and courtier Sir Thomas Chaloner.

According to the "Note on the Texts" in the revised critical edition, the original 1627 edition published by Bacon's literary executor William Rawley has "King Solamona" and "Salomon's House", while the 1658 and 1670 editions (long after Bacon's death) have "King Salomona" and "Solomon's House." The idea inspired followers like Samuel Hartlib and Robert Boyle and led to the Royal Society of 1660.

== Description of Salomon's House ==
A Father of Salomon's House explains the founding of Salomon's House by King Solamona:

"Ye shall understand (my dear friends) that amongst the excellent acts of that king, one above all hath the pre-eminence. It was the erection and institution of an Order or Society, which we call "Salomon's House"; the noblest foundation (as we think) that ever was upon the earth; and the lanthorn of this kingdom. It is dedicated to the study of the Works and Creatures of God. Some think it beareth the founder's name a little corrupted, as if it should be Solamona's House. But the records write it as it is spoken. So as I take it to be denominate of the King of the Hebrews, which is famous with you, and no stranger to us."

Exposition on Salomon's House is divided into four major sections: purpose, structures and equipment, roles, and ordinances and rites.

=== Purpose ===
The purpose of Salomon's House, or "end of [the] foundation," is as stated: "The End of our Foundation is the knowledge of Causes, and secret motions of things; and the enlarging of the bounds of Human Empire, to the effecting of all things possible."

=== Structures and equipment ===
Salomon's House in Bensalem includes the following structures and materials in order as presented in the text:

Salomon's House structure	Materials	Purpose	Modern equivalent
Caves		Coagulation Induration Refrigeration Conservation of bodies Imitation of natural mines Production of artificial metals Curing disease Prolongation of life via hermitage	Laboratories
Burials	Cements Composts Soils		Laboratories
Towers		Insolation Refrigeration Conservation Observation of meteorological phenomenon (wind, rain, snow, hail) Observation of astrological phenomenon	Observatories
Lakes (salt and fresh water)	Fish Fowl	Burying bodies	Laboratories
Pools	Salt water Fresh water	Desalination of salt water (salt to fresh) Salination of water (fresh to salt)	Laboratories
Islands and bays	Marine atmosphere		Observatories
Streams and cataracts		Production of energy for movement Powering of engines for wind turbines	Laboratories
Wells and fountains	Water of Paradise	Imitation of natural springs Production of minerals (vitriol, sulphur, steel, lead, brass, nitre, etc.) Infusion (Water of Paradise) – prolongation of life	Laboratories
Houses		Imitation of meteorological phenomenon Demonstration of meteorological phenomenon (snow, hail, rain, artificial rain of bodies, thunder, lightning)	Observatories
Chambers of health	Good quality air	Curing of diseases Preservation of health	Sanatoriums
Baths		Curing of diseases Restoration of bodies Strengthening of bodies (sinews, vital parts, juice and substance of the body)	Sanatoriums
Orchards and gardens	Ground Soil Trees (wild and fruit) Herbs Berries Flowers	Production of drinks Grafting Inoculation Manipulation of plant growth (out of season growth) Manipulation of fruit (taste, smell, color, size, shape) Creation of medicinal plants Creation of new plants	Experimental forests
Vineyards			Experimental forests
Parks and enclosures	Beasts Birds	Dissections Testing Prolongation of life Resuscitation Poison testing Medicine testing Manipulation of features (size, fertility, color, shape, habits) Creation of new animals Cross breeding	Zoological reserves
	Serpents Worms (silk worms) Flies (bees) Fish	Manipulation of features Breeding	Zoological reserves
Pools	Fish	Dissections Testing Prolongation of life Resuscitation Poison testing Medicine testing Manipulation of features (size, fertility, color, shape, habits) Creation of new animals Cross breeding	Zoological reserves
Brewhouses	Wines Juice of fruits, grains, roots Mixtures of honey, sugar, manna Decocted dried fruits Tree sap Cane pulp Drinks with herbs, roots, spices Drinks that serve the purpose of both food and hydration Thin drinks Nourishing water Strengthening drink	Production of drinks Aging of drinks (up to 40 years)	Experimental breweries
Bakehouses	Breads of grains, roots, kernels Breads with meat, fish Leavenings Seasonings Strengthening bread	Production of breads	Experimental kitchens
Kitchens	Tenderized meat Strengthening meat	Production of meats	Experimental kitchens
Dispensatories	Plants Living creatures Simples Drugs Medicine ingredients Heating equipment Percolating equipment Strainers	Aging of medicine Fermentation of medicine Distillation Separation	Clinics
Factories	Papers Linen Silks Tissues Feather work Dyes Patterns	Production of manufactured goods	
Furnaces	Fierce and quick heat Strong and constant heat Soft and mild heat Blown, quiet heat Dry, moist heat Heat which imitates the sun	Creation of various types of heat	
Perspective-houses	Glasses Spectacles	Demonstration of lights and radiations Production of light Manipulation of perspective Magnification of objects Creation of light effects (rainbows, halos, reflections, refractions)	Observatories/laboratories
	Precious stones Crystals Glass Metals Fossils Minerals Lodestones Rare stones (natural and artificial)		
Sound-houses	Harmonies Instruments of music Hearing aids Echoes Equipment to convey sound (trunks, pipes, lines)	Demonstration of the generation of all sounds and all sounds Imitation of all sounds and letters	Observatories/laboratories
Perfume-houses	Confiture-house	Practice of taste Imitation of tastes Practice of smell Multiplication of smells Imitation of smells Production of sweet-meats Production of wines, broths, sallets	Observatories/laboratories
Engine-houses	Weapons exceeding cannons and basilisks Instruments of war Gunpowder Fireworks Submersible ships and boats Swimming supporters Clocks Perpetual motion machines	Production of engines and instruments of motion Creation of deadlier weaponry Imitation of birds, flying Imitation of motions of living creatures Imitation of men	Observatories/laboratories Humanoid Robots
Mathematical-house		Geometry Astronomy	
Houses of deceits		Juggling False apparitions Impostures Illusions	Observatories/laboratories

=== Roles ===
Roles of members of Salomon's House are listed in order of appearance in the text below:

Title of role	Number of members	Duty
Father of Salomon's House		
Merchants of Light	12	Travel to foreign countries Procure books, abstracts, patterns of experiments
Depredators	3	Collect experiments from books
Mystery-men	3	Collect experiments of mechanical arts Collect experiments of liberal sciences Collect practices not in arts
Pioneers/miners	3	Execute new experiments
Compilers	3	Create titles and tables based on collected data
Dowry-men/benefactors	3	Extrapolate experimental data
Lamps	3	Direct new experiments based on data
Inoculators	3	Execute and report second round of experiments
Interpreters of Nature	3	Interpret new experimental data Create laws and axioms
Novices Apprentices Servants Attendants		Serve titled members

There are two notable imbalances in the information given. Firstly, the imbalance between the amount of equipment and the amount of manpower to operate it. Secondly, the ratio of roles collecting data to roles producing data.

=== Ordinances and rites ===
The ordinances and rites followed by the members of Salomon's House are described below:

==== Galleries ====
First Gallery includes the patterns and samples of notable inventions.

Second Gallery holds statues of notable inventors. Notably, the only inventor mentioned by name is Columbus, who is credited with discovering the West Indies. The other inventors are listed as the inventor of their invention. Statues in this gallery are made of various materials including but not limited to brass, marble, cedar, silver, and gold.

==== Hymns and services ====
Daily hymns and services include praising God as well as requesting His aid.

==== Circuits and visits ====
Members of the Salomon's house travel throughout the kingdom and perform three major actions. Firstly, they publish new inventions. Secondly, they divine natural disasters. Thirdly, they counsel the populace.
