= Brawley Municipal Airport =

Airport in California, United States

- IATA: BWC; ICAO: KBWC; FAA LID: BWC

Summary
- Airport type: City of Brawley
- Operator: Brawley, California
- Elevation AMSL: −129 ft (−39 m)
- Coordinates: 32°59′35″N 115°31′01″W
- Website: www.brawley-ca.gov/section/Public-Works/Municipal-Airport
- Interactive map of Brawley Municipal Airport

Runways
Direction	Length		Surface
Direction	ft	m	Surface
8/26	4,402	1,342	Asphalt

Brawley Municipal Airport (IATA: BWC, ICAO: KBWC, FAA LID: BWC) is one mile northeast of Brawley, in Imperial County, California, United States. It covers 160 acres (65 ha); its one runway, 8/26, is 4,402 x 60 ft (1,342 x 18.3 m) asphalt.
