= Fernando Eros Caro =

American serial killer

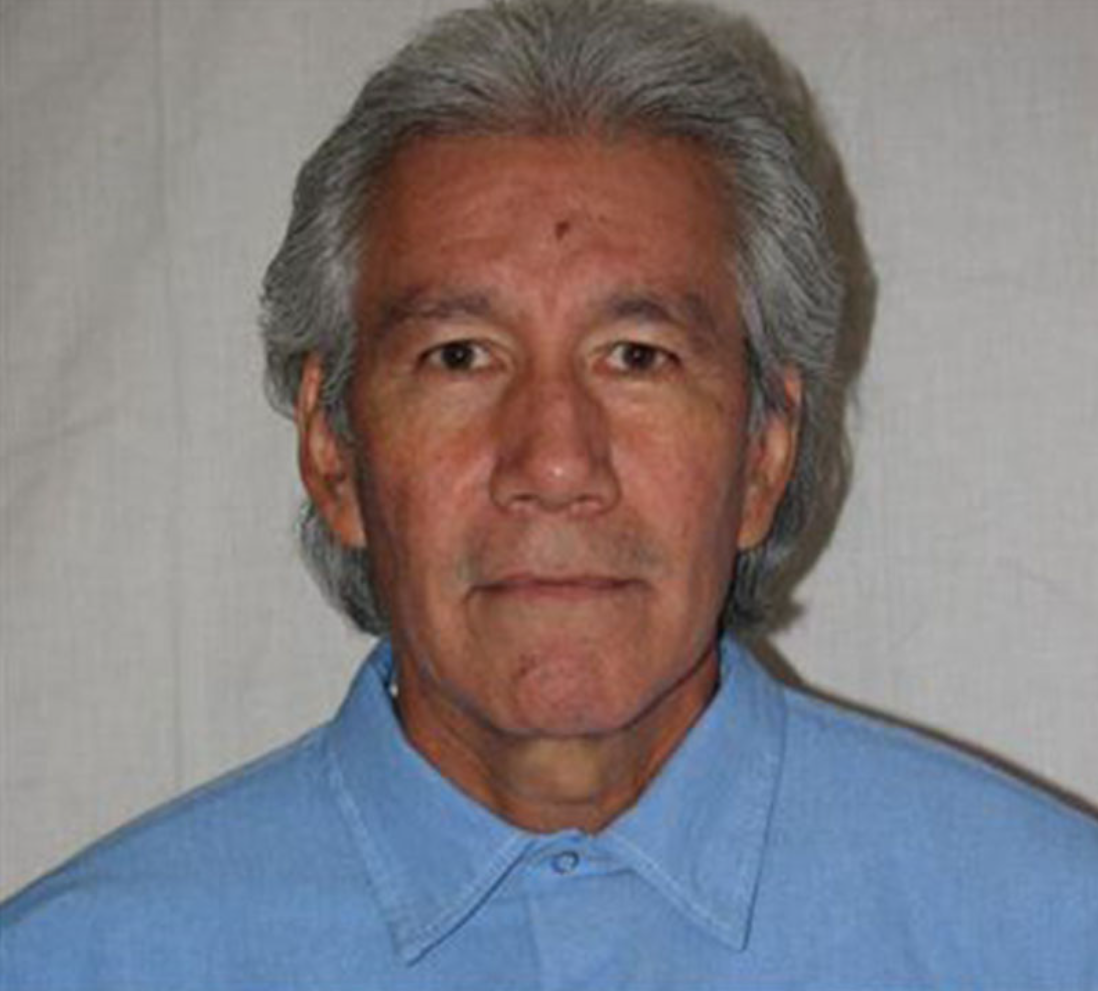
- Born: Fernando Eros Caro, Jr. December 3, 1949; Brawley, California, U.S.
- Died: January 28, 2017 (aged 67); San Quentin State Prison, San Quentin, California, U.S.
- Convictions: First degree murder with special circumstances (2 counts); Kidnapping; Assault with intent to murder (2 counts)
- Penalty: Death

Details
- Victims: 3–5+
- Span of crimes: 1979–1980
- Country: United States
- State: California
- Date apprehended: August 25, 1980

Fernando Eros Caro Jr. (December 3, 1949 – January 28, 2017) was an American serial killer, kidnapper and rapist who killed between three and at least five children and teenagers in Fresno County, California, from 1979 to 1980. Convicted and sentenced to death for a double murder, he spent the remainder of his life on death row until his death in 2017.

== Early life ==
Fernando Eros Caro Jr. was born on December 3, 1949, the first of eight children of two migrant workers. He was of Mexican-Aztec and Yaqui descent. As a young man, he spent most of his time working in the fields alongside his parents, and was reportedly frequently beaten by both of his parents in a variety of ways. In school, he was nicknamed "Stinky" because of a persistent bad odor that stemmed from the pesticides he was sprayed with while working in the fields.

In spite of these drawbacks, Caro finished his education and later went on to major in civil engineering at San Diego State University. He later dropped out of university and enlisted in the Marine Corps, where he eventually became an officer and flew attack helicopters. After being honorably discharged, Caro perpetrated his first kidnapping in 1976, when he abducted a law clerk and dragged her into the desert, where he proceeded to rape her. He was convicted and served two years imprisonment for this crime before being released.

== Murders ==
=== Victoria DeSantiago ===
On February 3, 1979, 8-year-old Victoria "Toria" DeSantiago left her family's home in Fresno to buy a loaf of bread from the local convenience store, accompanied by her 3-year-old sister Eva Marie and the family dog. After making the purchase, the girls realized that the dog had run away and went searching for it. At that time, they were approached by Caro, who offered to drive them around and help them search for the dog, which they accepted. Instead, he kidnapped them and drove away. Hours later, he released Eva Marie after raping her, but continued to hold Victoria hostage. Caro then drove to a field on Ashlan and Leonard avenues, where he proceeded to rape and then beat her to death. The little girl's battered body was found in a dry creek bed just three days later.

The murder greatly affected the city of Fresno, with local residents sending hundreds of letters of condolences to the grieving family members and local establishments establishing funds to support them financially. Facing increasing pressure to solve the crime, officers from the Fresno Police Department hired as much personnel as they could afford and questioned upwards of 292 possible suspects in relation to the case, but none of this led to an arrest. Six months after the murder, Lt. Maurice Regan, one of the leading detectives on the case, gave an interview to The Fresno Bee in which he claimed that the investigation was hampered by the fact that the sole reliable witness was only three years old and the fact that they were unable to gather any useful clues, despite using everything from aerial photography to hypnotizing other witnesses. Another investigator, Tim McFadden, expressed his belief that DeSantiago's murder was related to the unsolved rape of a 9-year-old in January due to the similarities, but also said that would not be conclusively proven until they could arrest the perpetrators.

Despite the lack of new leads in the DeSantiago case, its impact encouraged advocacy groups and the local community to spread awareness and improve their respective communities. The most notable of these was the "Play It Safe" program, founded by volunteers who gave coloring books informing young children about how to better protect themselves, as well as advocating for stronger law enforcement and harsher penalties against offenders who harm children.

=== Mark Hatcher and Mary Booher ===
On August 20, 1980, 15-year-old Mark Hatcher, a freshman at the Fowler High School in Fowler, decided to go on a bike ride with his 15-year-old cousin, Mary Helen Booher, who was visiting from Hawthorne. At around 8:15 pm, the pair were riding near a peach orchard, they crossed paths with Caro, who was driving an orange pickup truck. After convincing them to stop for a moment, he pulled out a gun and shot Hatcher, killing him instantly. He then abducted Booher, shoving her and the pair's bikes into his pickup truck before speeding away.

After driving less than a mile away from the crime scene, Caro accidentally hit another pickup truck parked at a tavern's parking lot on American and Clovis Avenues. The other vehicle's owners, 25-year-old Jack Lucchesi and 23-year-old Richard "Rick" Donner, heard the noise and went outside to investigate, where they saw the offender attempting to speed away. They got into the truck and followed him, forcing Caro to stop on Fowler Avenue. The two men, unaware that he was armed, simply asked him for the name of his insurance company, and when he went back to the truck ostensibly to get his identification, Caro grabbed his gun and opened fire on them. Donner was hit once in the thigh, while Lucchesi was shot twice in the back, but both men managed to flee while their assailant fled in his own truck. Later that night, Caro drove to an orange grove outside of Fresno, where he dragged Booher out and shot her once in the head, execution-style.

== Investigation and arrest ==
After having their injuries treated at hospital, Lucchesi and Donner provided police with a partial description of the assailant and his vehicle. In an attempt to extract more information from them, one of them was hypnotized, managing to provide a license plate number, which was only a few numbers off from Caro's license plate. Using this information, authorities began to question every single man matching the description and who owned an orange pickup truck. This tactic eventually led them to question Caro at his workplace at a FMC Corporation chemical plant on August 25, 1980, where he worked as a maintenance worker. Upon seeing the authorities, he attempted to run away, but was immediately apprehended and lodged into the Fresno County Jail. The arrest came as a shock to his co-workers, all of whom considered him a nice guy who just kept to himself. Later that day, Booher's body was found, and she was soon after interred next to her cousin at Fowler Cemetery. Not long after, Caro was charged with two counts of murder and assault with a deadly weapon, and one count of kidnapping and attempted rape.

=== Suspected murders (Charlena Simon and Robin Snead) ===
In the summer of 1980, a farm worker inspecting irrigation hoses in an orchard outside of Shafter found the bodies of two teenage girls. The younger one seemed to have been bound by the hand and foot and then shot behind the ear, while the older girl, who had been shot in the thigh, was apparently raped and then shot in the face. The bodies had yet to decompose, which suggested that they had been killed just recently and then dumped there by their assailant(s). Despite seemingly carrying items that would lead to a quick identification, this led nowhere, and as there were no reports of missing people matching the descriptions, the two girls remained unidentified.

In the aftermath of the Hatcher-Booher murders, detectives focused heavily on Caro, who had used a gun whose caliber was the same as the murder weapon used in the double murders of the two Jane Does. Although he was not prosecuted for the crimes in the end, detectives in Bakersfield considered the case solved with Caro's arrest, and then continued to focus on identifying the victims instead.

In February 1993, a detective re-examining the cold case managed to identify the two victims as 15-year-old Charlena Marie Simon and 16-year-old Robin Denise Snead. At the time of their disappearance sometime in March 1980, the two had run away from their parents' homes, and their parents had not reported them missing because they believed they had made a better life on their own.

== Trial and imprisonment ==
As Caro faced a potential death sentence, his attorneys asked for a change of venue, citing the notoriety of the double murder and the extensive press coverage in the area, after which the venue was moved to San Jose. At a preliminary hearing, Donner and Lucchesi testified about their encounter with Caro, while deputies who arrested him recollected that he had acknowledged they were looking for him, causing him to decide to shave his mustache and keep his truck parked in the garage. At the latter stages of the trial, Superior Court Justice Robert Mardikian denied a motion by Caro's attorney to separate the murder charges from Kern County from his present ones, despite the prosecutors from Kern County saying that they would not charge the defendant if he was sentenced to death. In the end, Caro was found guilty of the murders and sentenced to death.

Over the years, Caro and his lawyers filed multiple appeals in an attempt to have his sentence commuted, arguing that his childhood abuse and exposure to pesticides while working at FMC Corporation had led to mental abnormalities. His death sentence was eventually overturned in 2002 and a resentencing trial was ordered by the Circuit Court. One of his lawyers even appealed for a change of venue away from Fresno County, but this was denied. At the resentencing trial, Caro was resentenced to life imprisonment.

In 2009, he was linked via DNA to the DeSantiago murder, and prosecutors announced that they would seek the death penalty against him. Due to this, he remained on death row at San Quentin State Prison to await the outcome of the trial. During his years in prison, Caro learned to paint and used this talent to sell his artwork to buyers all over the world via commissions.

== Death ==
On January 28, 2017, Caro was found dead in his cell at San Quentin State Prison. An autopsy later declared that he likely died of natural causes.

== See also ==
- Capital punishment in California
- List of serial killers in the United States
