= New Atlantis =

Utopian novel by Sir Francis Bacon

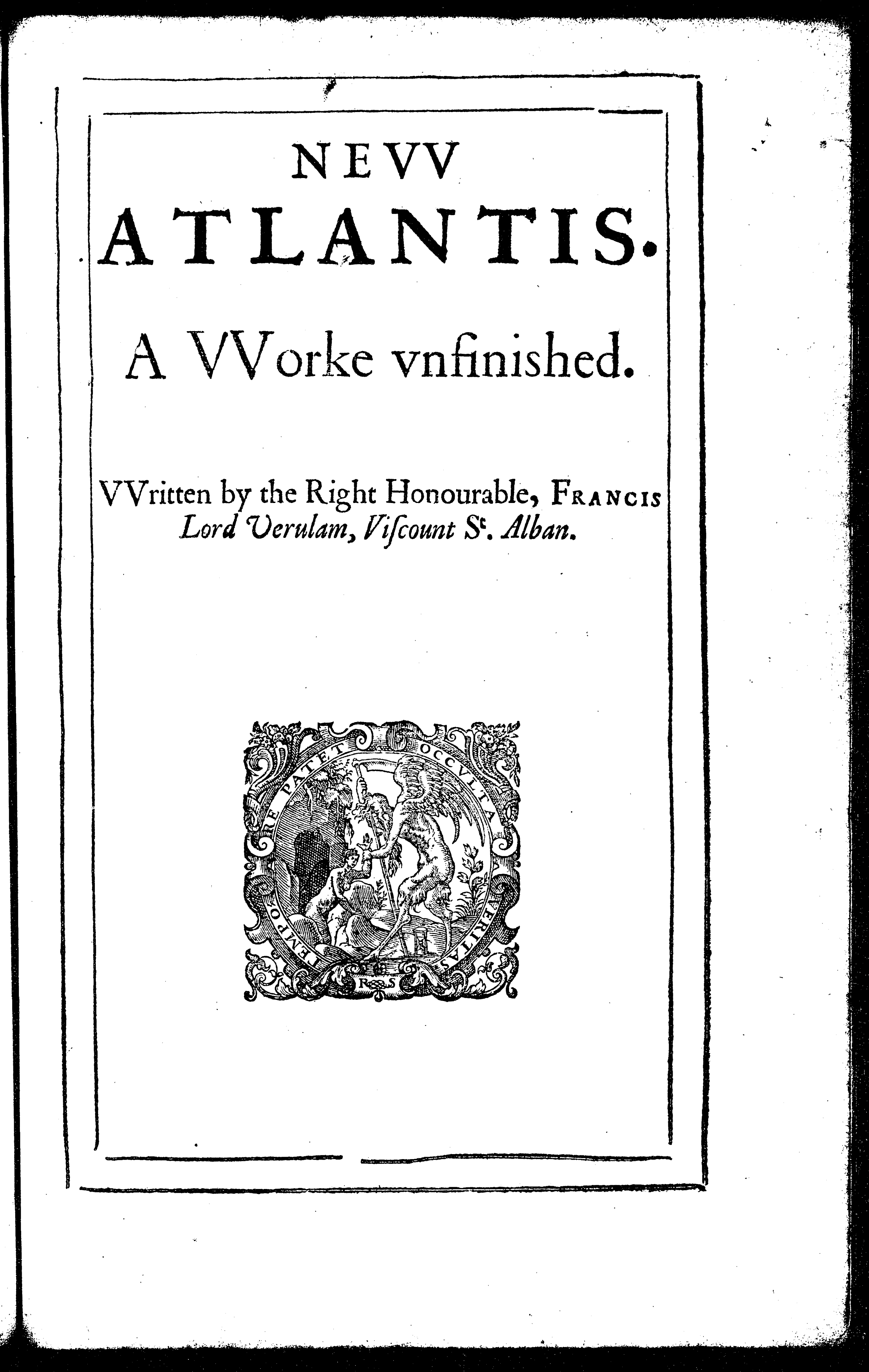
- Title page of the 1628 edition of Bacon's New Atlantis
- Author: Francis Bacon
- Language: English
- Genre: Utopian novel
- Publication date: 1626
- Publication place: United Kingdom
- Media type: Print (hardback)
- Pages: 46 pp

New Atlantis is a utopian novel by Sir Francis Bacon, published posthumously in 1626. It appeared unheralded and tucked into the back of a longer work of natural history, Sylva Sylvarum ("Forest of Materials"). In New Atlantis, Bacon portrays a vision of the future of human discovery and knowledge, expressing his aspirations and ideals for humankind. The novel depicts the creation of a utopian land where "generosity and enlightenment, dignity and splendour, piety and public spirit" are the commonly held qualities of the inhabitants of the mythical Bensalem. The plan and organisation of his ideal college, Salomon's House (or Solomon's House), prefigured the modern research university in both applied and pure sciences.

== Publication history ==
New Atlantis first appeared in the back of Sylva Sylvarum, a rather complex work of natural history that was published by William Rawley, Bacon's secretary, chaplain and amanuensis in 1626. When Sylva was entered into the Stationers' Register of July 4, 1626 (three months after Bacon's death), no mention was made of New Atlantis, and it was not until 1670 that it was included on Sylva's letterpress title page (unlike Historia vitae et mortis which received that accolade in 1651). It was not until 1676 that the two works were published with continuous signatures, with the first edition of the Sylva being "printed for J. H. for William Lee", while New Atlantis was, according to McKerrow, "perhaps printed by Mathewes". After New Atlantis was a two-page piece called Magnalia naturae, which most commentators tend to ignore, probably because it is difficult to link it to either Sylva or New Atlantis with any surety. It was published as an individual text by Thomas Newcomb in 1659, but in general New Atlantis appears to have been a text that no-one quite knew what to do with. Certainly Rawley's letter To The Reader indicates that he was less than clear as to its purpose, even though he later published it in Latin translation within the collection Operum moralium et civilium tomus (1638). In 1659 Thomas Bushell referred to the work in his Mineral Prosecutions, while in 1660 a certain R. H. published a continuation of New Atlantis and, in 1662, an explicitly Rosicrucian version appeared as the preface to John Heydon's Holy Guide.

== Plot summary ==
The novel depicts a mythical island, Bensalem, which is discovered by the crew of a European ship after they have lost their way in the Pacific Ocean somewhere west of Peru. The minimal plot serves the gradual unfolding of the island, its customs, but most importantly, its state-sponsored scientific institution, Salomon's House, "which house or college ... is the very eye of this kingdom."

Many aspects of the society and history of the island are described, such as the Christian religion – which is reported to have been born there as a copy of the Bible and a letter from the Apostle Saint Bartholomew arrived there miraculously, a few years after the Ascension of Jesus; a cultural feast in honour of the family institution, called "the Feast of the Family"; a college of sages, the Salomon's House, "the very eye of the kingdom", to which order "God of heaven and earth had vouchsafed the grace to know the works of Creation, and the secrets of them", as well as "to discern between divine miracles, works of nature, works of art, and impostures and illusions of all sorts"; and a series of instruments, process and methods of scientific research that were employed in the island by the Salomon's House.

The interlocutors include the governor of the House of Strangers, Joabin the Jew, and the Head of Salomon's House.

The inhabitants of Bensalem are described as having a high moral character and honesty, as no official accepts any payment from individuals. The people are also described as chaste and pious, as said by an inhabitant of the island:

But hear me now, and I will tell you what I know. You shall understand that there is not under the heavens so chaste a nation as this of Bensalem; nor so free from all pollution or foulness. It is the virgin of the world. I remember I have read in one of your European books, of an holy hermit amongst you that desired to see the Spirit of Fornication; and there appeared to him a little foul ugly Aethiop. But if he had desired to see the Spirit of Chastity of Bensalem, it would have appeared to him in the likeness of a fair beautiful Cherubim. For there is nothing amongst mortal men more fair and admirable, than the chaste minds of this people. Know therefore, that with them there are no stews, no dissolute houses, no courtesans, nor anything of that kind.

In the last third of the book, the Head of the Salomon's House takes one of the European visitors to show him all the scientific background of Salomon's House, where experiments are conducted in Baconian method to understand and conquer nature, and to apply the collected knowledge to the betterment of society. Namely: 1) the end, or purpose, of their foundation; 2) the preparations they have for their works; 3) the several employments and functions whereto their fellows are assigned; 4) and the ordinances and rites which they observe.

He portrayed a vision of the future of human discovery and knowledge. The plan and organisation of his ideal college, "Salomon's House", prefigures the modern research university in both applied and pure science.

The end of their foundation is thus described: "The end of our foundation is the knowledge of causes, and secret motions of things; and the enlarging of the bounds of human empire, to the effecting of all things possible".

In describing the several employments and functions to which the members of the Salomon's House are assigned, the Head of the college said:

“For the several employments and offices of our fellows, we have twelve that sail into foreign countries under the names of other nations (for our own we conceal), who bring us the books and abstracts, and patterns of experiments of all other parts. These we call merchants of light.

“We have three that collect the experiments which are in all books. These we call depredators.

“We have three that collect the experiments of all mechanical arts, and also of liberal sciences, and also of practices which are not brought into arts. These we call mystery–men.

“We have three that try new experiments, such as themselves think good. These we call pioneers or miners.

“We have three that draw the experiments of the former four into titles and tables, to give the better light for the drawing of observations and axioms out of them. These we call compilers.

“We have three that bend themselves, looking into the experiments of their fellows, and cast about how to draw out of them things of use and practice for man's life and knowledge, as well for works as for plain demonstration of causes, means of natural divinations, and the easy and clear discovery of the virtues and parts of bodies. These we call dowry–men or benefactors.

“Then after diverse meetings and consults of our whole number, to consider of the former labours and collections, we have three that take care out of them to direct new experiments, of a higher light, more penetrating into nature than the former. These we call lamps.

“We have three others that do execute the experiments so directed, and report them. These we call inoculators.

“Lastly, we have three that raise the former discoveries by experiments into greater observations, axioms, and aphorisms. These we call interpreters of nature."

Even this short excerpt demonstrates that Bacon understood that science requires analysis and not just the accumulation of observations. Bacon also foresaw that the design of experiments could be improved. (Note: Thus foreshadowing modern response surface methodology and optimal design.)

In describing the ordinances and rites observed by the scientists of Salomon's House, its Head said:

We have certain hymns and services, which we say daily, of Lord and thanks to God for His marvellous works; and some forms of prayer, imploring His aid and blessing for the illumination of our labors, and the turning of them into good and holy uses.

And finally, after showing all the scientific background of Salomon's House, he gave the European visitor permission to publish it:

And when he had said this, he stood up; and I, as I had been taught, kneeled down, and he laid his right hand upon my head, and said; "God bless thee, my son; and God bless this relation, which I have made. I give thee leave to publish it for the good of other nations; for we here are in God's bosom, a land unknown."

It is important to highlight the languages mentioned in the work: in one of the most revealing passages, when the European castaways arrive on the island of Bensalem, they receive a written message, and then the character in several languages:

- Ancient Hebrew
- Ancient Greek
- Scholastic Latin
- Spanish, a language that is also used by one of the inhabitants of the New Atlantis:
  "“After we had read the letter, and had delivered the same to the messenger, and shewed the sign of our health (which he likewise returned), he returned. He came again, within a short time, in a boat, with half-a-dozen of our people, and in the midst of the boat stood a man of a pleasing countenance, who, as soon as he was come within a flight-shot of the ship, spake aloud in the Spanish tongue, saying, 'Are ye Christians?'”
  This detail is not accidental: Bacon selects these languages for their cultural, religious and scientific weight in the history of Western civilization.

== The name "Bensalem" ==
"Bensalem" is composed of two Hebrew words: "ben" (בן)—"son", and "salem" (שלם)—"peace".

Thus, the name means "Son of Peace.”

== Interpretations ==
New Atlantis is a story dense with provocative details. There are many credible interpretations of what Bacon was attempting to convey. Below are a couple that give some sense of the rich implications of the text.

=== Bensalem's conversion to Christianity ===
Early in the story, the governor of the House of Strangers relates the incredible circumstances that introduced Christianity to the Island:

“About twenty years after the ascension of our Saviour it came to pass [c. A.D. 50], that there was seen by the people of Renfusa (a city upon the eastern coast of our island, within sight, the night was cloudy and calm), as it might be some mile in the sea, a great pillar of light; not sharp, but in form of a column, or cylinder, rising from the sea, a great way up toward heaven; and on the top of it was seen a large cross of light, more bright and resplendent than the body of the pillar. Upon which so strange a spectacle, the people of the city gathered apace together upon the sands, to wonder; and so after put themselves into a number of small boats to go nearer to this marvellous sight. But when the boats were come within about sixty yards of the pillar, they found themselves all bound, and could go no further, yet so as they might move to go about, but might not approach nearer; so as the boats stood all as in a theatre, beholding this light, as a heavenly sign. It so fell out that there was in one of the boats one of the wise men of the Society of Salomon's House (which house, or college, my good brethren, is the very eye of this kingdom), who having awhile attentively and devoutly viewed and contemplated this pillar and cross, fell down upon his face; and then raised himself upon his knees, and lifting up his hands to heaven, made his prayers in this manner:

"'Lord God of heaven and earth; thou hast vouchsafed of thy grace, to those of our order to know thy works of creation, and true secrets of them; and to discern, as far as appertaineth to the generations of men, between divine miracles, works of nature, works of art and impostures, and illusions of all sorts. I do here acknowledge and testify before this people that the thing we now see before our eyes is thy finger, and a true miracle. And forasmuch as we learn in our books that thou never workest miracles, but to a divine and excellent end (for the laws of nature are thine own laws, and thou exceedest them not but upon great cause), we most humbly beseech thee to prosper this great sign, and to give us the interpretation and use of it in mercy; which thou dost in some part secretly promise, by sending it unto us.'

“When he had made his prayer he presently found the boat he was in movable and unbound; whereas all the rest remained still fast; and taking that for an assurance of leave to approach, he caused the boat to be softly and with silence rowed toward the pillar; but ere he came near it, the pillar and cross of light broke up, and cast itself abroad, as it were, into a firmament of many stars, which also vanished soon after, and there was nothing left to be seen but a small ark or chest of cedar, dry and not wet at all with water, though it swam; and in the fore end of it, which was toward him, grew a small green branch of palm; and when the wise man had taken it with all reverence into his boat, it opened of itself, and there were found in it a book and a letter, both written in fine parchment, and wrapped in sindons of linen. The book contained all the canonical books of the Old and New Testament, according as you have them (for we know well what the churches with you receive), and the Apocalypse itself; and some other books of the New Testament, which were not at that time written, were nevertheless in the book. And for the letter, it was in these words:

"'I, Bartholomew, a servant of the Highest, and apostle of Jesus Christ, was warned by an angel that appeared to me in a vision of glory, that I should commit this ark to the floods of the sea. Therefore I do testify and declare unto that people where God shall ordain this ark to come to land, that in the same day is come unto them salvation and peace, and good-will from the Father, and from the Lord Jesus.'

"There was also in both these writings, as well the book as the letter, wrought a great miracle, conform to that of the apostles, in the original gift of tongues. For there being at that time, in this land, Hebrews, Persians, and Indians, besides the natives, everyone read upon the book and letter, as if they had been written in his own language. And thus was this land saved from infidelity (as the remain of the old world was from water) by an ark, through the apostolical and miraculous evangelism of St. Bartholomew." And here he paused, and a messenger came and called him forth from us. So this was all that passed in that conference."

The traditional date for the writing of St. John's Apocalypse (the Book of Revelation) is the end of the 1st century AD. It is not only the presence of the full canon of Scripture long before it was completed or compiled, but also the all-too-convenient proximity of the scientist who will attest to its miraculous nature of this wonder that lends the story an air of incredibility.

Later the Father of Salomon's House reveals the institution's skill at creating illusions of light:

"We represent also all multiplications of light, which we carry to great distance, and make so sharp as to discern small points and lines. Also all colorations of light: all delusions and deceits of the sight, in figures, magnitudes, motions, colors; all demonstrations of shadows. We find also divers means, yet unknown to you, of producing of light, originally from divers bodies."

He also boasts about their ability to fake miracles:

"And surely you will easily believe that we, that have so many things truly natural which induce admiration, could in a world of particulars deceive the senses if we would disguise those things, and labor to make them more miraculous."

Renaker points out in the Latin translation of the second passage (which was published as part of Operum moralium et civilium tomus in 1638 by William Rawley, Bacon's amanuensis, secretary and chaplain, who was also behind the publication of New Atlantis in 1626) is stronger and literally translates to "we could impose on men's senses an infinite number of things if we wanted to present these things as, and exalt them into, a miracle." While this has been read as Bacon's suggesting that the story if not the "miracle" itself was an invention emanating from Salomon's House, this is perhaps not a safe inference. The relevance of the Brother of Salomon's House to the story of the island's conversion to Christianity is more an indication that the institution itself has reached a point in its knowledge from which it can ascertain whether an occurrence is natural or not. It is this knowledge (and its humble application) that allows for the revelation itself to be delivered.

The skill of creating illusions coupled with the incredibility of the story of the origin of Bensalem's Christianity makes it seem that Bacon was intimating that the light show (or at least the story of its occurrence) was an invention of Salomon's House.

The presence of "Hebrews, Persians, and Indians" in Bensalem at the time implies that Asian people were already in the first century engaged in sailing across the Pacific—which is historically inaccurate, but might have seemed plausible at the time of writing.

=== Who rules Bensalem? ===
The Father of Salomon's House reveals that members of that institution decide on their own which of their discoveries to keep secret, even from the State:

"And this we do also: we have consultations, which of the inventions and experiences which we have discovered shall be published, and which not; and take all an oath of secrecy for the concealing of those which we think fit to keep secret; though some of those we do reveal sometime to the State, and some not."

This would seem to imply that the State does not hold the monopoly on authority and that Salomon's House must in some sense be superior to the State.

In the introduction to the critical edition of New Atlantis, Jerry Weinberger notes that Joabin is the only contemporary character (i.e., living at the time of the story) described as wise—and wise in matters of government and rule at that. Weinberger speculates that Joabin may be the actual ruler of Bensalem. On the other hand, prejudice against Jews was widespread in his time, so the possibility cannot be excluded that Bacon was calling Joabin wise for the same reason that he felt the need elsewhere to call him "the good Jew": to make clear that Joabin's character was benign.

=== Social ritual of the Bensalemites ===
While Bacon appears concerned with the House of Salomon, a portion of the narrative describes the social practices of the Bensalemites, particularly those surrounding courtship and family life. An example of these rituals is the Adam and Eve pools. Here betrothed send surrogates to observe the other bathing to discover any deformities. Here Bacon alludes to Sir Thomas More's Utopia (1516), where More describes a similar ritual. However, the crucial difference is rather than surrogates, the young couple observe each other naked. Bacon's character Joabin remarks on this difference: "I have read in a book of one of your men, of a Feigned Commonwealth, where the married couple are permitted, before they contract, to see one another naked."

== Prayers ==
(See Bacon's Prayers in Wikisource).

In describing how the scientists of New Atlantis worked, Bacon wrote:

We have certain hymns and services, which we say daily, of Lord and thanks to God for His marvellous works; and some forms of prayer, imploring His aid and blessing for the illumination of our labors, and the turning of them into good and holy uses.

In Bacon's Theological Tracts, there are two prayers, named "The Student's Prayer" and "The Writer's Prayer" which may be a demonstration of how scientists could pray as described in The New Atlantis.

== Influences ==
New Atlantis and other writings of Bacon inspired the formation of the Royal Society. Jonathan Swift parodied them both in book III of Gulliver's Travels.

In recent years, New Atlantis influenced B. F. Skinner's 1948 Walden Two.

This novel may have been Bacon's vision for a Utopian New World in North America. In it he depicted a land where there would be freedom of religion—showing a Jew treated fairly and equally in an island of Christians. It has been argued that this work had influenced others reforms, such as greater rights for women, the abolition of slavery, elimination of debtors' prisons, separation of church and state, and freedom of political expression, although there is no hint of these reforms in The New Atlantis itself. His propositions for legal reform (which were not, however, implemented in his lifetime), are considered to have formed one of the influences behind the Napoleonic Code, and could therefore have exercised an indirect influence upon the drafting of other liberal constitutions—most notably the American Constitution—that came into being after Bacon's death.

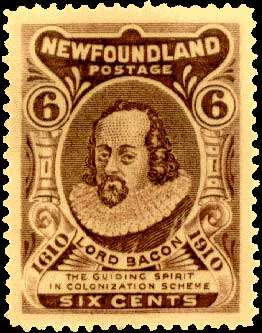
A Newfoundland stamp which reads "Lord Bacon – the guiding spirit in colonization scheme"

Francis Bacon played a leading role in creating the English colonies, especially in Virginia, the Carolinas, and Newfoundland in northeastern Canada. His government report on "The Virginia Colony" was submitted in 1609. In 1610 Bacon and his associates received a charter from the king to form the Tresurer and the Companye of Adventurers and planter of the Cittye of London and Bristoll for the Collonye or plantacon in Newfoundland and sent John Guy to found a colony there. In 1910 Newfoundland issued a postage stamp to commemorate Bacon's role in establishing the province. The stamp describes Bacon as "the guiding spirit in colonization scheme" of 1610. Moreover, some scholars believe he was largely responsible for the drafting, in 1609 and 1612, of two charters of government for the Virginia Colony. Thomas Jefferson, the third President of the United States and author of the Declaration of Independence, wrote: "Bacon, Locke and Newton. I consider them as the three greatest men that have ever lived, without any exception, and as having laid the foundation of those superstructures which have been raised in the Physical and Moral sciences". Historian and biographer William Hepworth Dixon stated that "The United States can also claim among their muster-roll of Founders the not less noble name of Francis Bacon." It is also believed by the Rosicrucian organisation AMORC that Bacon would have influenced a settlement of mystics in North America, stating that The New Atlantis inspired a colony of Rosicrucians led by Johannes Kelpius to journey across the Atlantic Ocean in a chartered vessel called Sarah Mariah, and move on to Pennsylvania in the late 17th century. According to their claims, these Rosicrucian communities "made valuable contributions to the newly emerging American culture in the fields of printing, philosophy, the sciences and arts".

New Atlantis was quoted by pioneering British electronic music composer Daphne Oram in the Appendix of her 1972 book An Individual Note, specifically the section ‘Wee have also Sound-Houses’, which she equated to the function and design of contemporary recording studios.

Wee have also Sound-houses, wher wee practise and demonstrate all Sounds, and their Generation. Wee have Harmonies which you have not, of Quarter-Sounds, and lesser Slides of Sounds. Diverse Instruments of Musick likewise to you unknowne, some sweeter then any you have; Together with Bells and Rings that are dainty and sweet. Wee represent Small Sounds as Great and Deepe; Likewise Great Sounds, Extenuate and Sharpe; Wee make diverse Tremblings and Warblings of Sounds, which in their Originall are Entire. Wee represent and imitate all Articulate Sounds and Letters, and the Voices and Notes of Beasts and Birds. Wee have certaine Helps, which sett to the Eare doe further the Hearing greatly. Wee have also diverse Strange and Artificiall Eccho’s, Reflecting the Voice many times, and as it were Tossing it: And some that give back the Voice Lowder then it come, some Shriller, and some Deeper; Yea some rendring the Voice, Differing in the Letters or Articulate Sound, from that they receyve. Wee have also meanes to convey Sounds in Trunks and Pipes, in strange Lines and Distances.

Oram placed a typewritten copy of this passage on the wall of the BBC Radiophonic Workshop in London, which she co-founded in 1958. Oram also wrote her own version of it in 1960 entitled Atlantis Anew.

We have also soundhouses, where we practise the healing powers of sound; where we analyse each human being’s innate waveform and induce those harmonics to resonate which have fallen out of sorts… ”.

== See also ==
- Design of experiments
- Los Horcones (an experimental community inspired by Walden Two)
- Royal Society
- Scientocracy
- Technocracy
- The City of the Sun (1602), a similar early utopian novel by the Italian Dominican and philosopher Tommaso Campanella
