= Rudy Seánez =

American baseball player (born 1968)

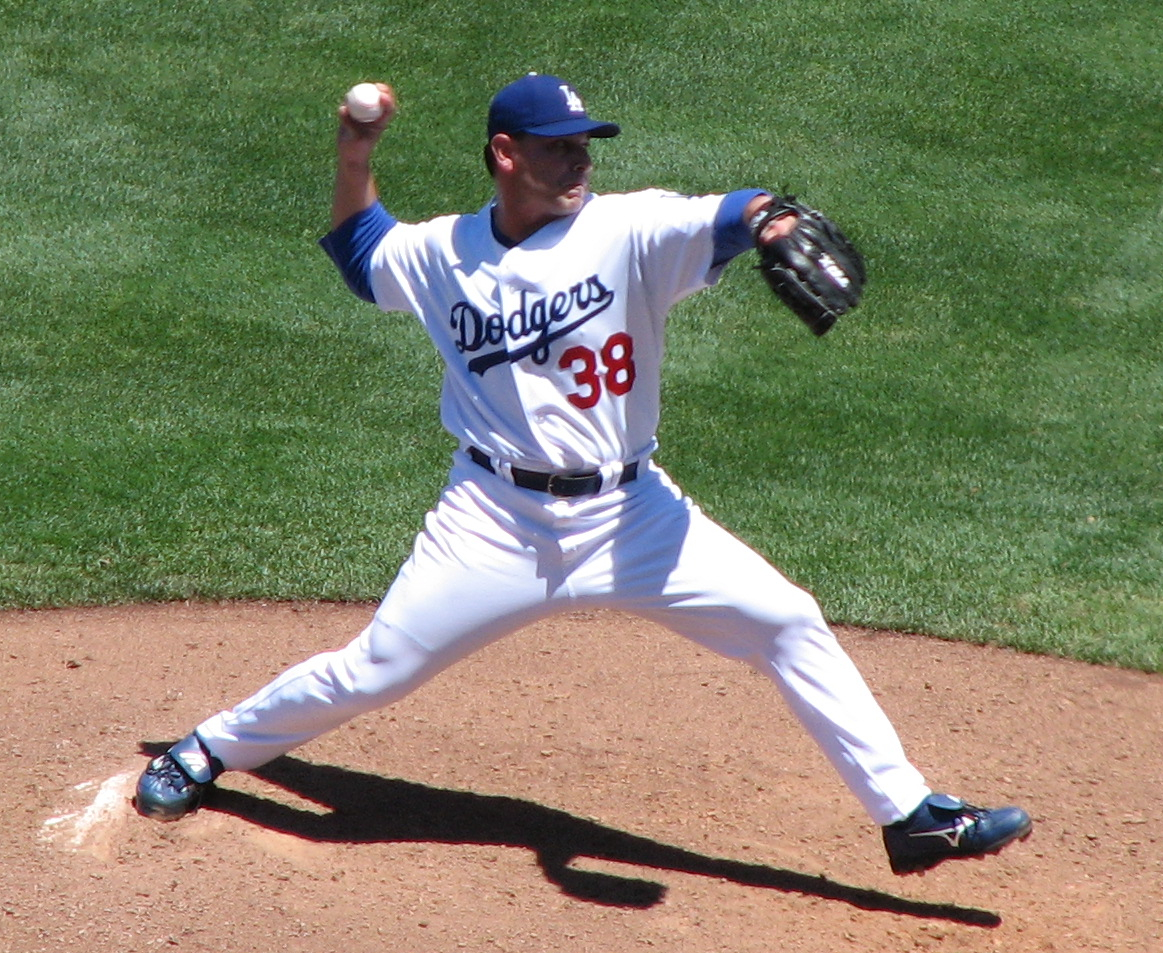
- Seánez with the Los Angeles Dodgers in 2007
- Pitcher
- Born: October 20, 1968 (age 57); Brawley, California, U.S.
- Batted: Right Threw: Right

MLB debut
- September 7, 1989, for the Cleveland Indians

Last MLB appearance
- September 28, 2008, for the Philadelphia Phillies

MLB statistics
- Win–loss record: 41–30
- Earned run average: 4.10
- Strikeouts: 574
- Stats at Baseball Reference

Teams
- Cleveland Indians (1989–1991); San Diego Padres (1993); Los Angeles Dodgers (1994–1995); Atlanta Braves (1998–2000); San Diego Padres (2001); Atlanta Braves (2001); Texas Rangers (2002); Boston Red Sox (2003); Kansas City Royals (2004); Florida Marlins (2004); San Diego Padres (2005); Boston Red Sox (2006); San Diego Padres (2006); Los Angeles Dodgers (2007); Philadelphia Phillies (2008)

Rudy Caballero Seánez [Seh-ah-nez] (born October 20, 1968), is an American former professional baseball relief pitcher, who played in all or parts of 17 Major League Baseball (MLB) seasons, over a 20-year span (1989–2008).

Seánez, who is of Mexican American descent, was originally drafted by the Cleveland Indians in 1986. Over the course of his long big league career, he has played for many teams, including the Cleveland Indians, San Diego Padres (four separate stints), Los Angeles Dodgers (twice), Atlanta Braves (twice), Texas Rangers, Boston Red Sox (twice), Kansas City Royals, Florida Marlins, and Philadelphia Phillies. Seánez garnered one World Series ring, with the 2008 Phillies. He threw and batted right-handed.

== Early life ==
Seanez attended Brawley Union High School in Brawley, California, and was a letterman in football and baseball. He was drafted out of high school by the Cleveland Indians in the 4th round of the 1986 MLB draft.

== Career ==
Seánez made his major league debut on September 7, 1989, for the Indians against the Toronto Blue Jays. He worked 2 scoreless innings in relief during the Indians 17-9 loss to the Blue Jays.

On September 29, 2004 while pitching for the Florida Marlins Seánez recorded the final out at Montreal's Olympic Stadium when he got Terrmel Sledge to pop out to third base to end the final Montreal Expos home game before the team became the Washington Nationals in 2005

Seánez' best season came in 2005 with the San Diego Padres. He posted a 7–1 record with a 2.69 ERA, setting career highs in wins (7), games pitched (57), innings (60.1) and strikeouts (84). With only 22 walks issued, Seánez averaged nearly four strikeouts per walk. He limited opponents to a .222 batting average and compiled a WHIP of 1.18. He also ranked second among National League relievers with 12.5 strikeouts per nine innings and tied for second in the league with seven relief wins.

In a 16-season career, Seánez is 41–30 with 12 saves and a 4.12 ERA in 515 appearances, all in relief. Seánez showed ability to overcome numerous injuries, combining weightlifting with mixed martial arts during his off-season workout regimen. Seánez also trained with professional Ultimate Fighting Championship fighters and sports several tattoos.

Seánez was an aggressive pitcher who challenged hitters with his 96 mile-per-hour fastball. His slider and changeup were also effective, and he was capable against batters from both sides of the plate. He did a better job than many middle relievers at holding on base runners, and was a competent fielder despite a history of back problems.

In 2008, after 20 years in the big leagues, Seanez earned his first World Series ring as a member of the Philadelphia Phillies. He was not included on the club's postseason roster, but did travel with the team and was in uniform for all of the team's playoff games.

On May 18, 2009, he passed a physical and signed a minor league deal to the Los Angeles Angels of Anaheim. He was released on July 18.

== Retirement ==
In November 2010, he retired from baseball. He currently owns Seanez Sports Academy. The 15,776 square foot facility includes cages for batting and pitching. There is also an open area for agility training, and a sports performance gym.
