= William Crawley (disambiguation) =

William Crawley is a Northern Irish journalist.

William Crawley may also refer to:

- William Crawley (priest) (1803–1896), Anglican priest
- William Crawley-Boevey (born 1960), English mathematician
- Bill Crawley (fl. 1970–2008), American academic historian

== See also ==
- William Cawley (disambiguation)
- Bill Crowley (disambiguation)
