= Brawley Union High School =

Public high school in California, United States

Location
- 480 N. Imperial Ave. Brawley, CA 92227-1625; United States; 32°58′58″N 115°32′4″W

Information
- Motto: Unity in Diversity
- School district: Brawley Union High School District
- CEEB code: 050365
- NCES School ID: 060582000524
- Principal: Jesse Sanchez
- Teaching staff: 80.39 (FTE)
- Grades: 9-12
- Gender: co-educational
- Enrollment: 1,863 (2024–2025)
- Student to teacher ratio: 23.17
- Colors: Blue and Gold
- Mascot: Wildcat
- Yearbook: 2024 - 2025 Small town, Big dreams
- Website: www.brawleyhigh.org/o/buhs

Brawley Union High School (BUHS) is a high school in Brawley, California.

== Notable alumni ==
- Mike Mohamed, class of 2006, NFL linebacker
- Sid Monge, class of 1970, MLB pitcher (1975-1984)
- Sergio Romo, class of 2001, MLB pitcher for the Seattle Mariners
- Jake Sanchez, Mexican League Baseball pitcher
- Rudy Seánez, class of 1986, MLB pitcher (1989–2008)
