= Robert J. Brawley =

American artist (1937–2006)

Robert Julius Brawley (1937 - April 14, 2006) was an American painter, known for his still life and figure works.

Brawley received a Bachelor of Fine Arts in 1963 and a Master of Fine Arts in 1965 from the San Francisco Art Institute. As a student, he was an abstract expressionist painter, but after happening upon the work of Flemish realists while studying at the Academy of Fine Arts, in Florence, Italy and traveling to Northern Europe to view more Netherlandish work, he turned toward representational painting, primarily still lifes and figure work. Many of his still lifes are symbolic and, although often described as a realist or hyperrealist, in a 1988 interview he remarked, "I don't think I'm a realist....I'm an illusionist."

His works are on display in the National Museum of American Art, Art Institute of Chicago, and the Nelson-Atkins Museum of Art in Kansas City, Missouri.

He was a professor, and chairman of the art department at the University of Kansas.

Brawley died in 2006 of cancer.

== Sources ==
- Newspaper Article, Lawrence Journal World
- Askart.com entry
