= Brawley Peaks =

Mountain in California, United States

- Location within California

Highest point
- Elevation: 2,832 m (9,291 ft)

Geography
- Country: United States
- State: California
- County: Mono County
- Range coordinates: 38°14′11.709″N 118°56′3.508″W
- Topo map: USGS Kirkwood Spring

The Brawley Peaks are a mountain range in Mono County, California.
