= Frawley =

Frawley is a surname. Notable people with the surname include:

== Arts and entertainment ==
- Barbara Frawley (1935–2004), Australian actress and voice artist
- James Frawley (1936–2019), American director and actor
- John Frawley (actor) (died 1999), Australian actor
- Maurice Frawley (1954–2009), Australian musician
- William Frawley (1887–1966), American actor best known for playing Fred Mertz on I Love Lucy

== Politics ==
- Arthur J. Frawley (c.1899–1969), American politician
- Des Frawley (1924–1996), Australian politician
- James J. Frawley (1867–1926), New York State Senator and Tammany Hall leader

== Sport ==
- Ciarán Frawley (born 1997), Irish rugby union player
- Craig Frawley (born 1980), Australian rugby league footballer
- Damien Frawley (born 1962), Australian rugby union player
- Dan Frawley (1882–1967), pioneer Australian rugby league footballer
- Dan Frawley (ice hockey) (born 1962), Canadian hockey player best known as captain of the Pittsburgh Penguins
- Danny Frawley (1963–2019), Australian rules footballer, coach and commentator
- James Frawley (Australian rules footballer) (born 1988)
- James Frawley (tennis) (born 1994), Australian tennis player
- John Frawley (tennis) (born 1965), retired Australian tennis player
- Lee Frawley (born 1954), equestrian
- Matt Frawley (born 1994), Australian rugby league player
- Mick Frawley (1885–1919), Australian rugby league footballer
- Rod Frawley (born 1952), Australian tennis player

== Other ==
- David Frawley, American author on Hinduism
- John Frawley (astrologer) (born 1955), English astrologer, writer and educator
- Patrick Frawley, Chairman Schick Safety Razor Company and founder of Schick-Shadel addiction programs

== See also ==
- Frawley Ranch, South Dakota
