= William Brawley =

William or Bill Brawley may refer to:

- William H. Brawley (1841–1916), U.S. Representative from South Carolina and U.S. federal judge
- William M. Brawley (born 1949), member of the North Carolina General Assembly
- "Big Bill" Brawley, a character in the film The Bruiser
