= William Rawley =

English chaplain (c. 1588 – 1667)

William Rawley (c. 1588 – 1667), born in Norwich, was the chaplain of several major 17th-century English figures, including the philosopher Francis Bacon, King Charles I, and King Charles II. In this role, he served as Bacon's literary executor, with the standing and means to preserve many of Bacon's papers and see to the posthumous publication of many of his written works.

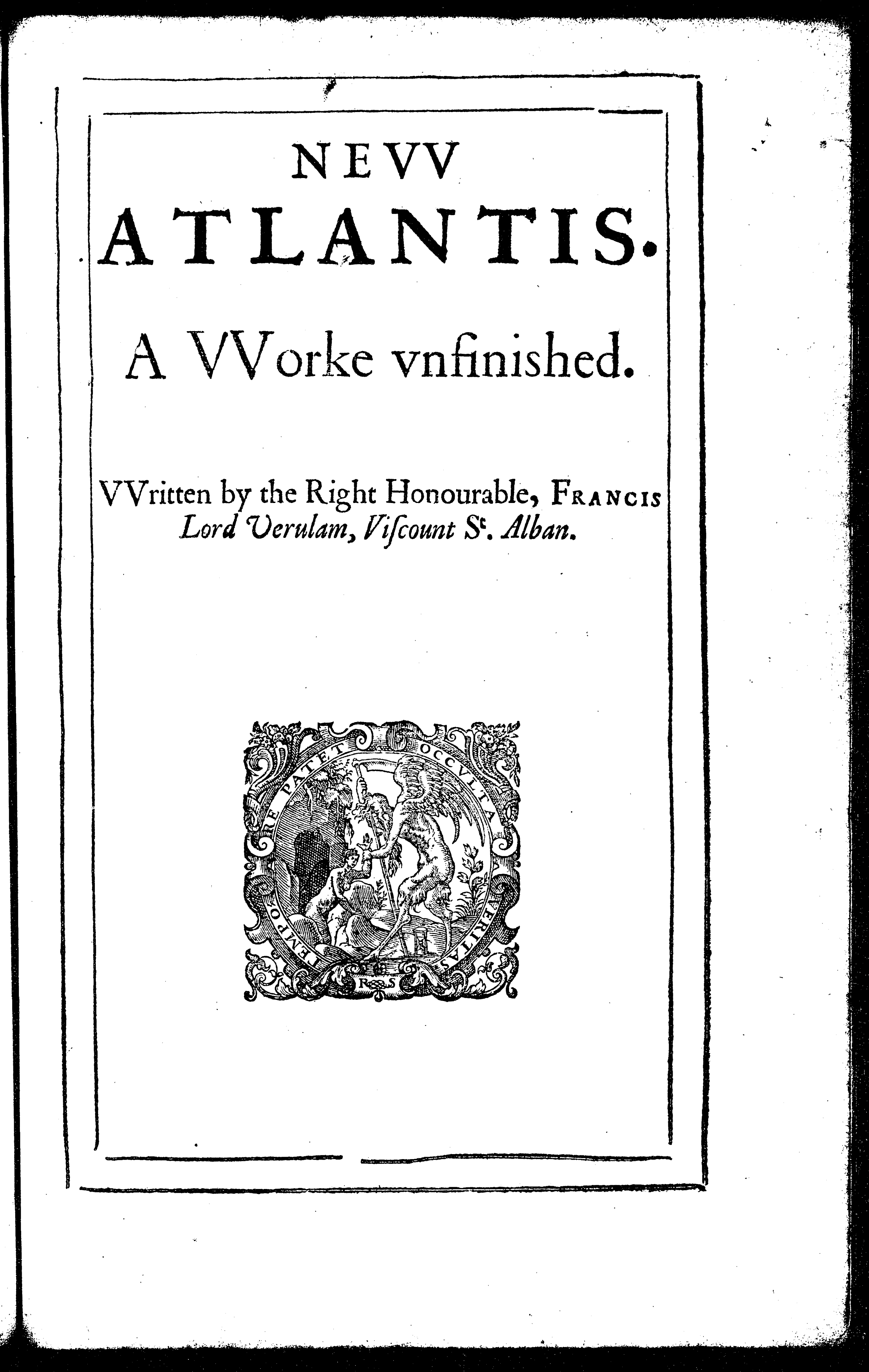
1628 edition of New Atlantis edited by Rawley.

== Literary executor ==
When Bacon died in 1626, the former Lord Chancellor bequeathed Rawley, who had been his private chaplain, his papers and a large sum of money. Bacon's estate was effectively bankrupt and no cash bequest changed hands, but the deceased philosopher's papers were considered worthless and the creditors allowed Rawley to take them. Rawley continued to admire Bacon's memory, and worked with associates, led by Thomas Meautys, to edit and publish many of the manuscripts. This required serious literary work, as Bacon had left many of his manuscripts incomplete. Baconian works published by Rawley include the English edition of New Atlantis (1628), Bacon's controversial work of utopian political philosophy.

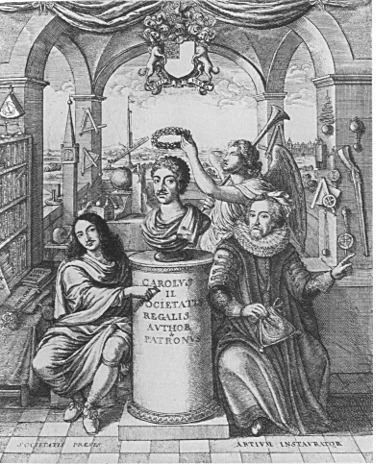
Frontispiece to A History of the Royal Society, depicting, in idealized allegory, the role of Sir Francis Bacon (on the right) in the foundation of the Society.

Catherine Drinker Bowen, one of Bacon's biographers, credits her protagonist with inspiring the creation of London's Royal Society, originally conceived as a group of disinterested scientists working under royal patronage and modeled after the scholars of the New Atlantis. Bowen suggests that Rawley's role as defender of Bacon's insights and literary memory helped encourage elite opinion during the reign of Charles II.
