= Brawley, California =

City in California, United States

- City
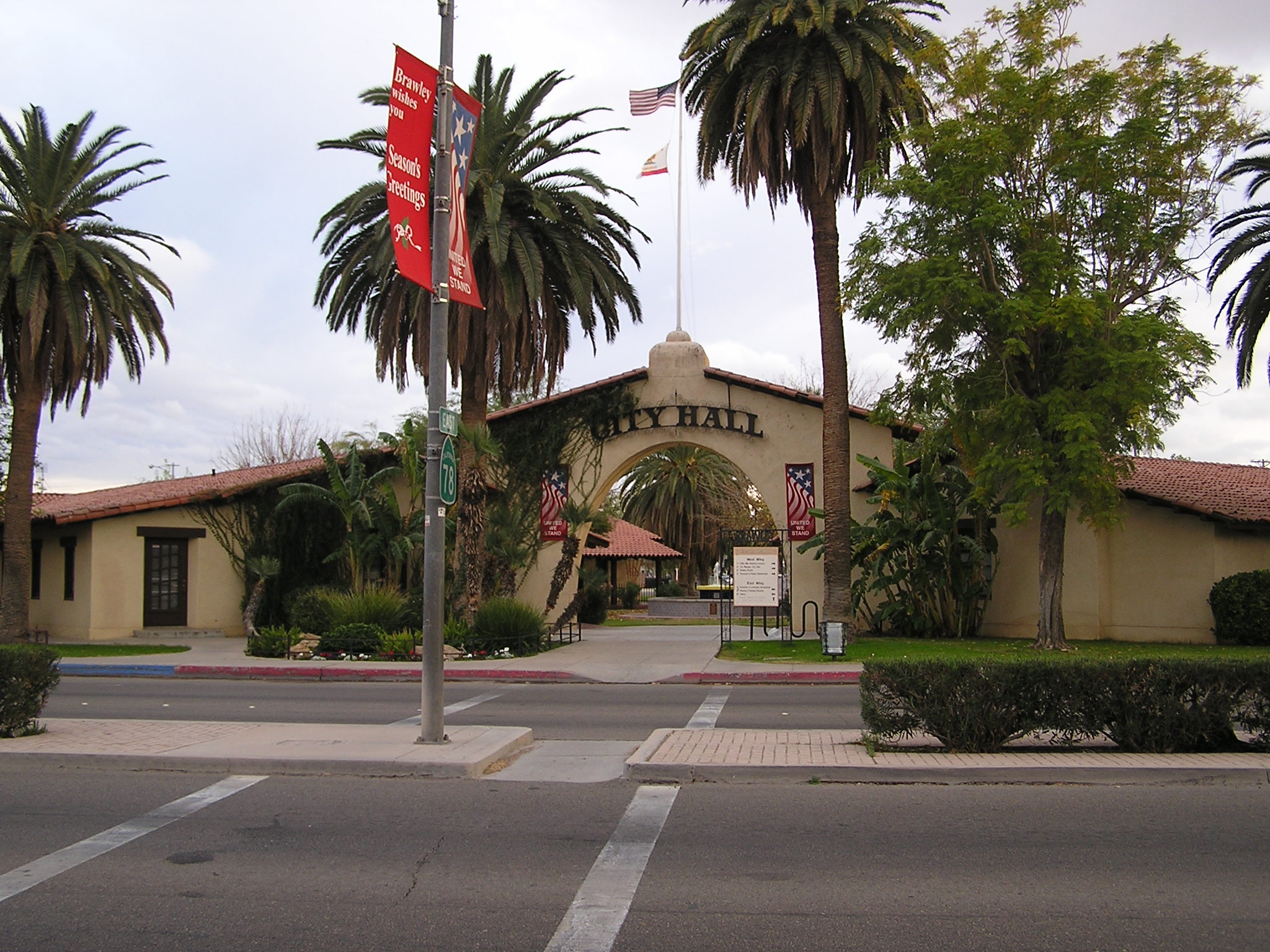
- City Hall of Brawley

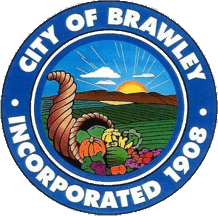
- Seal
- Interactive map of Brawley, California
- Location within California Location within the United States
- Coordinates: 32°58′43″N 115°31′49″W
- Country: United States
- State: California
- County: Imperial
- Incorporated: April 6, 1908

Area
  - Total: 8.12 sq mi (21.02 km^{2})
  - Land: 8.12 sq mi (21.02 km^{2})
  - Water: 0 sq mi (0.00 km^{2}) 0%
- Elevation: −112 ft (−34 m)

Population (2020)
  - Total: 26,416
  - Density: 3,254.2/sq mi (1,256.45/km^{2})
- Time zone: UTC−08:00 (PST)
  - Summer (DST): UTC−07:00 (PDT)
- ZIP Code: 92227
- Area codes: 442/760
- FIPS code: 06-08058
- GNIS feature IDs: 1656443, 2409893
- Website: www.brawley-ca.gov

Brawley (formerly Braly) is a city in Imperial County, California, United States within the Imperial Valley.

The population was 26,416 at the 2020 census, up from 24,953 at the 2010 census. Year-round agriculture is an important economic activity in Brawley. The town has a significant cattle and feed industry, and hosts the annual Cattle Call Rodeo. Summer daytime temperatures often exceed 105 °F (41 °C).

== History ==
The Imperial Land Company laid out the town in 1902 and named it Braly in honor of J.H. Braly, who owned the land. After Braly refused to permit the use of his name, the name was changed to Brawley. The first post office at Brawley opened in 1903.

Incorporated in 1908, it was a "tent city" of only 100 persons involved in railroads and the earliest introduction of agriculture. It had a population of 11,922 in 1950, but population growth was slow from the 1960s to the early 1990s.

== Geography ==
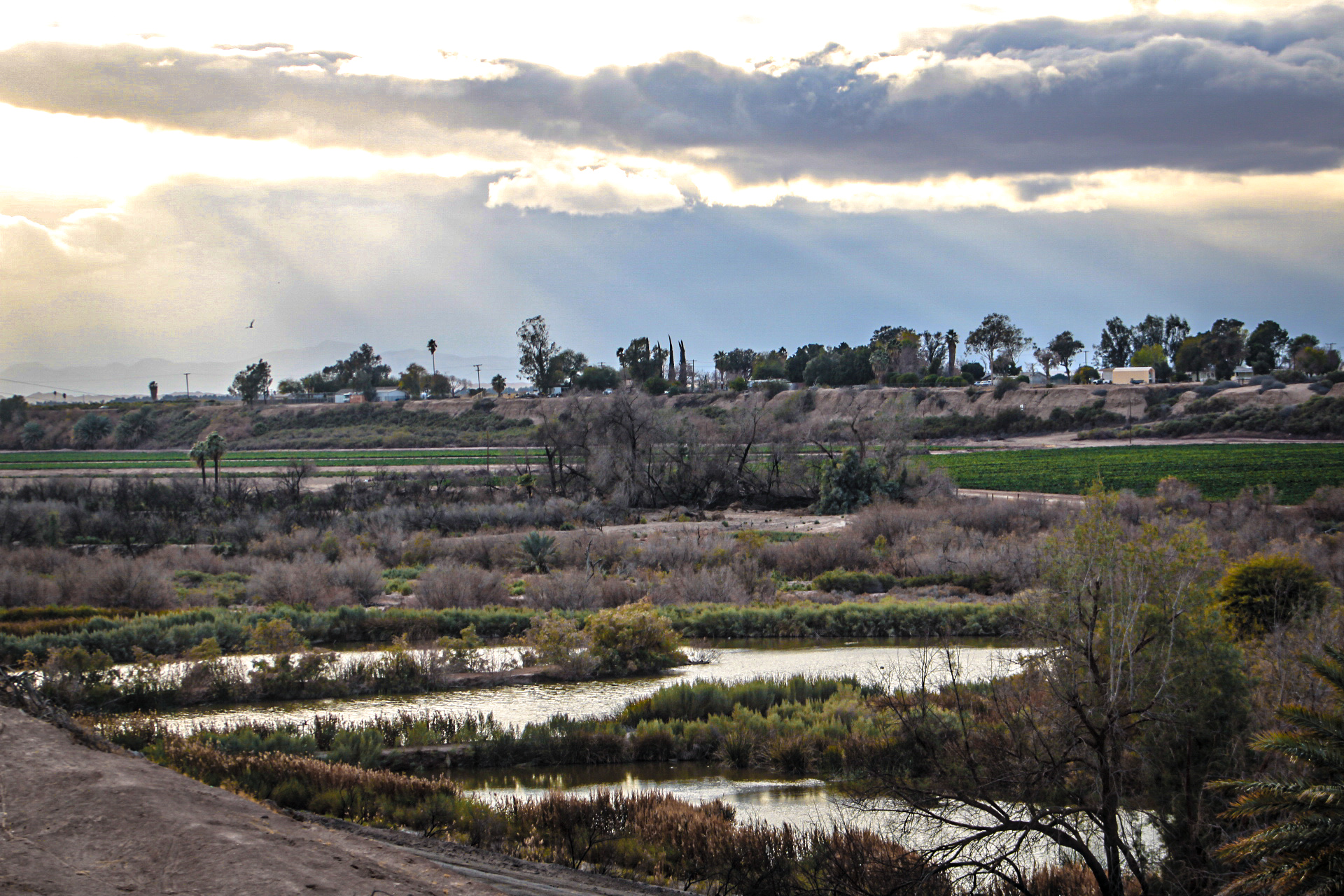
New River Brawley

Brawley is located in the Colorado Desert and Lower Colorado River Valley regions. The city's elevation, like other Imperial Valley towns, is below sea level.

It is 13 miles (21 km) north of El Centro, about 25 miles north of the US-Mexico border, about 70 miles west of Yuma, Arizona, 95 miles southeast of Palm Springs and 130 miles east of San Diego.

According to the United States Census Bureau, Brawley has a total area of 7.7 square miles (20 km^{2}). All is land within the city limits, except for the Alamo River and New River that seasonally flow through the city.

=== Climate ===
Average January temperatures in Brawley are a high of 71.7 °F or 22.1 °C and a low of 41.4 °F or 5.2 °C. Average July temperatures are a high of 108.2 °F or 42.3 °C and a low of 76.6 °F or 24.8 °C. On average, 177.0 afternoons during the year have highs of 90 °F or 32 °C or higher. The record high temperature was 122 °F (50.0 °C) on July 1, 1950, and the record low temperature was 4 °F (−15.6 °C) on January 1, 1919.

Average annual precipitation is 2.38 inches (6.0 cm) with an average of 15 days with measurable precipitation. December is the wettest month of the year, while June is the driest. The wettest year was 1939 with 8.18 inches (207.8 mm), while the driest year was 1953, in which no measurable precipitation fell in Brawley. The most rainfall in one month was 6.75 inches (171.5 mm) in September 1939. The most rainfall in 24 hours was 3.90 inches (99.1 mm) on October 10, 1932. A rare snowfall in December 1932 brought a total of 3.0 inches (0.076 m).

Climate data for Brawley, California, 1991–2020 normals, extremes 1910–2007
Month	Jan	Feb	Mar	Apr	May	Jun	Jul	Aug	Sep	Oct	Nov	Dec	Year
Record high °F (°C)	89 (32)	97 (36)	104 (40)	108 (42)	118 (48)	121 (49)	122 (50)	120 (49)	121 (49)	111 (44)	100 (38)	98 (37)	122 (50)
Mean daily maximum °F (°C)	71.7 (22.1)	74.8 (23.8)	81.2 (27.3)	87.2 (30.7)	94.9 (34.9)	104.0 (40.0)	108.2 (42.3)	108.2 (42.3)	103.9 (39.9)	93.1 (33.9)	80.3 (26.8)	70.0 (21.1)	89.8 (32.1)
Daily mean °F (°C)	56.6 (13.7)	59.6 (15.3)	65.5 (18.6)	70.7 (21.5)	77.8 (25.4)	86.2 (30.1)	92.4 (33.6)	93.1 (33.9)	87.6 (30.9)	76.6 (24.8)	64.4 (18.0)	55.3 (12.9)	73.8 (23.2)
Mean daily minimum °F (°C)	41.4 (5.2)	44.5 (6.9)	49.8 (9.9)	54.3 (12.4)	60.6 (15.9)	68.4 (20.2)	76.6 (24.8)	78.0 (25.6)	71.2 (21.8)	60.1 (15.6)	48.6 (9.2)	40.5 (4.7)	57.8 (14.4)
Record low °F (°C)	4 (−16)	25 (−4)	28 (−2)	35 (2)	40 (4)	35 (2)	55 (13)	59 (15)	50 (10)	30 (−1)	26 (−3)	20 (−7)	4 (−16)
Average precipitation inches (mm)	0.47 (12)	0.50 (13)	0.31 (7.9)	0.10 (2.5)	0.01 (0.25)	0.00 (0.00)	0.03 (0.76)	0.07 (1.8)	0.09 (2.3)	0.14 (3.6)	0.19 (4.8)	0.47 (12)	2.38 (60.91)
Average precipitation days (≥ 0.01 in)	2.8	3.1	2.5	0.6	0.4	0.0	0.2	0.7	0.4	0.6	1.1	2.1	14.5
Source 1: NOAA
Source 2: XMACIS2

== Demographics ==
Historical population
Census	Pop.	Note	%±
1910	881		—
1920	5,389		511.7%
1930	10,439		93.7%
1940	11,718		12.3%
1950	11,922		1.7%
1960	12,703		6.6%
1970	13,746		8.2%
1980	14,946		8.7%
1990	18,923		26.6%
2000	22,052		16.5%
2010	24,953		13.2%
2020	26,416		5.9%
U.S. Decennial Census

=== 2020 census ===
As of the 2020 census, Brawley had a population of 26,416 and a population density of 3,254.0 inhabitants per square mile (1,256.4/km^{2}). 99.3% of residents lived in urban areas, while 0.7% lived in rural areas. The census reported that 99.4% of the population lived in households, 0.3% lived in non-institutionalized group quarters, and 0.3% were institutionalized.

The median age was 32.7 years; 29.6% were under the age of 18, 9.4% were aged 18 to 24, 26.0% were aged 25 to 44, 21.9% were aged 45 to 64, and 13.1% were 65 years of age or older. For every 100 females there were 93.0 males, and for every 100 females age 18 and over there were 89.0 males.

There were 8,233 households, of which 45.1% had children under the age of 18 living in them; 48.1% were married-couple households, 6.6% were cohabiting couple households, 30.7% had a female householder with no partner present, and 14.6% had a male householder with no partner present. About 18.3% of all households were made up of individuals, and 8.7% had someone living alone who was 65 years of age or older. The average household size was 3.19. There were 6,413 families (77.9% of all households).

There were 8,597 housing units at an average density of 1,059.0 units per square mile (408.9 units/km^{2}), of which 8,233 (95.8%) were occupied; 51.8% were owner-occupied and 48.2% were occupied by renters. The homeowner vacancy rate was 0.9% and the rental vacancy rate was 3.4%.

Racial composition as of the 2020 census
Race	Number	Percent
White	8,317	31.5%
Black or African American	427	1.6%
American Indian and Alaska Native	370	1.4%
Asian	423	1.6%
Native Hawaiian and Other Pacific Islander	29	0.1%
Some other race	9,800	37.1%
Two or more races	7,050	26.7%
Hispanic or Latino (of any race)	22,750	86.1%

=== 2023 ACS estimate ===
In 2023, the US Census Bureau estimated that the median household income was $60,370, and the per capita income was $25,729. About 18.3% of families and 20.9% of the population were below the poverty line.

=== 2010 census ===
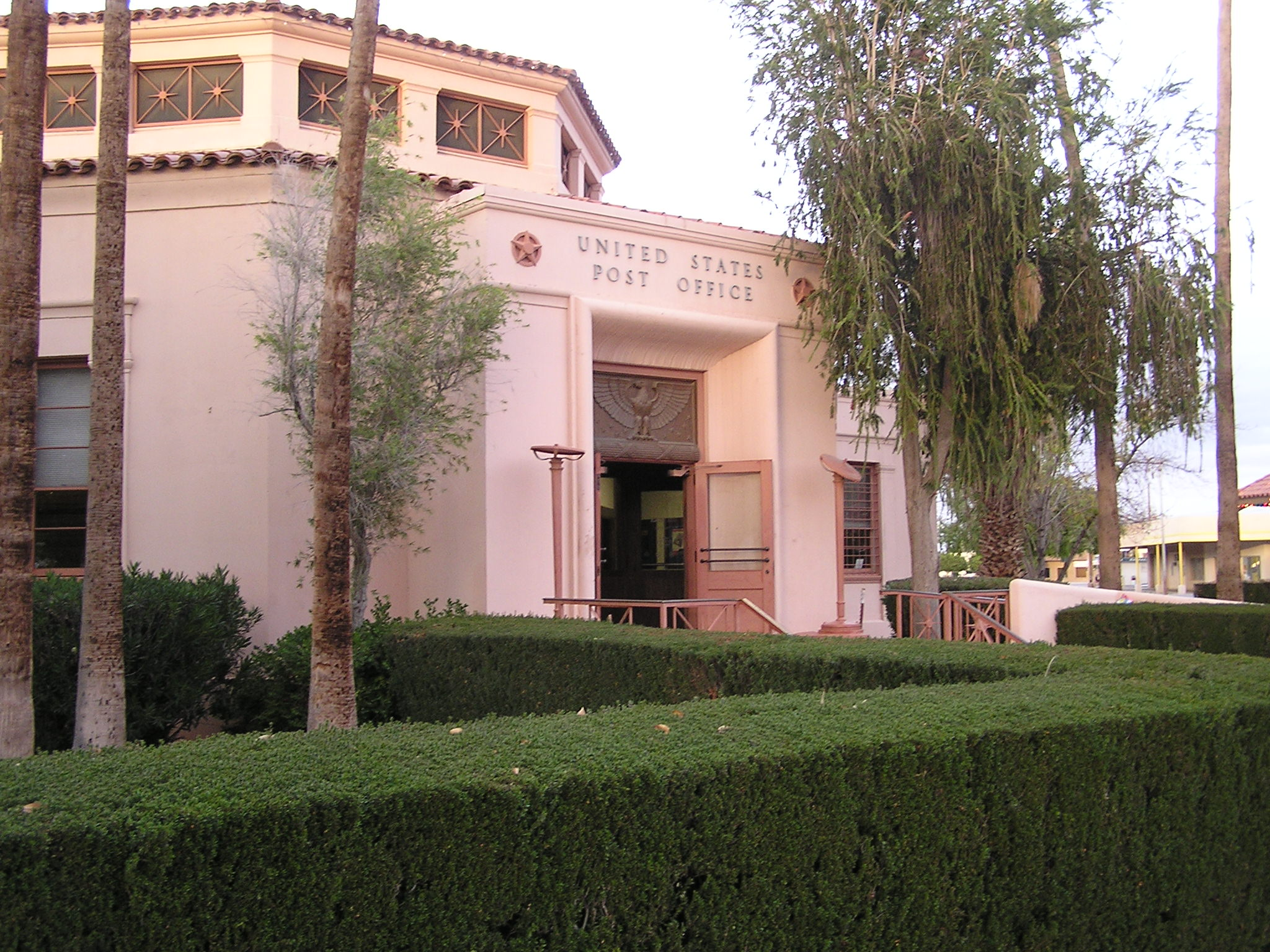
Octagonal post office in Brawley

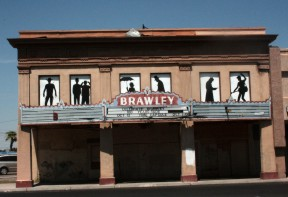
Theater in Brawley

At the 2010 census Brawley had a population of 24,953. The population density was 3,248.4 inhabitants per square mile (1,254.2/km^{2}). The racial makeup of Brawley was 13,570 (54.4%) White, 510 (2.0%) African American, 241 (1.0%) Native American, 349 (1.4%) Asian, 32 (0.1%) Pacific Islander, 9,258 (37.1%) from other races, and 993 (4.0%) from two or more races. Hispanic or Latino of any race were 20,344 persons (81.5%).

The census reported that 24,779 people (99.3% of the population) lived in households, 63 (0.3%) lived in non-institutionalized group quarters, and 111 (0.4%) were institutionalized.

There were 7,623 households, 3,827 (50.2%) had children under the age of 18 living in them, 3,932 (51.6%) were opposite-sex married couples living together, 1,560 (20.5%) had a female householder with no husband present, 543 (7.1%) had a male householder with no wife present. There were 589 (7.7%) unmarried opposite-sex partnerships, and 23 (0.3%) same-sex married couples or partnerships. 1,346 households (17.7%) were one person and 550 (7.2%) had someone living alone who was 65 or older. The average household size was 3.25. There were 6,035 families (79.2% of households); the average family size was 3.67.

The age distribution was 8,138 people (32.6%) under the age of 18, 2,670 people (10.7%) aged 18 to 24, 6,065 people (24.3%) aged 25 to 44, 5,572 people (22.3%) aged 45 to 64, and 2,508 people (10.1%) who were 65 or older. The median age was 30.2 years. For every 100 females, there were 94.3 males. For every 100 females age 18 and over, there were 90.2 males.

There were 8,231 housing units at an average density of 1,071.5 per square mile (413.7/km^{2}), of which 7,623 were occupied, 3,970 (52.1%) by the owners and 3,653 (47.9%) by renters. The homeowner vacancy rate was 2.0%; the rental vacancy rate was 8.0%. 12,950 people (51.9% of the population) lived in owner-occupied housing units and 11,829 people (47.4%) lived in rental housing units.

82.9% Brawley's residents today are of Mexican and Latino origins; the town contained White, East Indian, Chinese, Filipino and African American sections in the 20th century.

== Economy ==
Major employers in Brawley include Pioneers Memorial Hospital, and Clinicas de Salud del Pueblo. Spreckels Sugar Company is located outside of Brawley.

== Government ==
In the California State Legislature, Brawley is in the 18th senatorial district, represented by Democrat Steve Padilla, and the 36th Assembly district, represented by Republican Jeff Gonzalez.

In the United States House of Representatives, Brawley is in California's 25th congressional district, represented by Democrat Raul Ruiz.

Brawley is in the 4th Imperial County Board of Supervisors District and is represented by Ryan Kelley.

== Education ==
- High-school age students in both Brawley and neighboring Westmorland use the Brawley Union High School District, of which there is one high school, Brawley Union High School.
- Brawley also offers Desert Valley High School (10th, 11th and 12th grades), Renaissance (9th and 10th grade), and Del Rio (10th, 11th and 12th grade) all three high schools.
- Brawley is also home to Brawley Christian Academy, a private institution.
- Children from kindergarten through eighth grade use the Brawley Elementary School District. There are five schools in the Brawley Elementary School District: Barbara Worth Junior High School (serving 7th and 8th grades), Phil D. Swing Elementary School (serving kindergarten-6th grades), Miguel Hidalgo Elementary School (serving kindergarten-6th grades), J.W. Oakley Elementary School (serving kindergarten-6th grades), and Myron D. Witter Elementary School (serving kindergarten-6th grades).
- Brawley is located in the Imperial Community College District of which there is one junior college, Imperial Valley College.
- San Diego State University operates a satellite campus in Brawley.

== Infrastructure ==
Brawley maintains its own police and fire departments.

== Notable people ==
- The Bella Twins, professional wrestlers
- Fernando Eros Caro, pedophile and serial killer
- Helen Fabela Chávez, Labor Leader
- Alan Fowlkes, former pitcher for San Francisco Giants
- Harry Gibson, boogie woogie musician
- Joe Hoover, Major League Baseball shortstop, Detroit Tigers
- Al McCandless, United States Representative
- Mike Mohamed, NFL linebacker, Houston Texans
- Sid Monge, MLB pitcher
- Barbara O'Brien, Lieutenant Governor of Colorado
- Sergio Romo, MLB relief pitcher
- Don Rowe, MLB pitcher and coach, New York Mets
- Howard Rumsey, musician
- Rudy Seánez, MLB relief pitcher
- Jim Skipper, NFL running backs coach, Carolina Panthers
- Steve Taylor, contemporary Christian singer
- Eddie Zuko, musical artist
