= Ambrose Smith =

London mercer and silkman who supplied Elizabeth I

Ambrose Smith or Smythe (died 1584) was a London mercer in Cheapside and silkman who supplied Elizabeth I

Smith was a son of John Smith (died 1545) of Withcote, near Oakham, in Leicestershire, and Dorothy Cave, a sister of Ambrose Cave. John Leland visited their "right goodly house" at Withcote in 1539, "one of the fairest houses in Leicestershire".

His older brother Roger Smith (died 1603) inherited the estate, but Ambrose bought it from him in 1575. Roger Smith married Frances Griffin, a daughter of Thomas Griffin of Dingley.

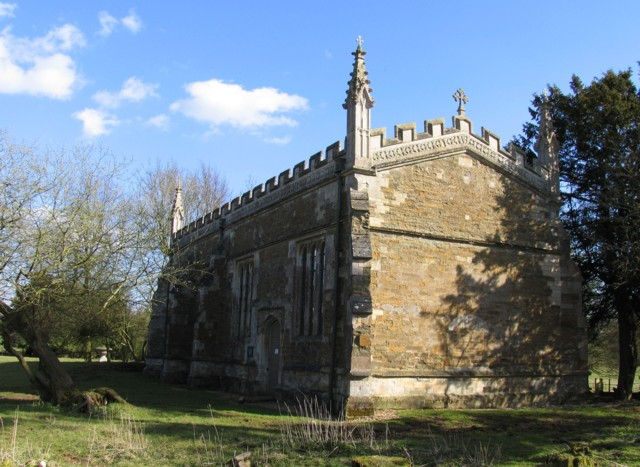
Withcote Chapel remains from the Tudor mansion of the Smith family, the stained glass windows were commissioned by Ambrose Smith's grandmother and her second husband Roger Ratcliffe

Ambrose Smith supplied velvet, satin, taffeta, and sarsenet to Queen Elizabeth.

He sold fabrics to Robert Dudley, 1st Earl of Leicester and Amy Robsart, some for the use of their Spanish tailor. Thomas Butler, 10th Earl of Ormond owed him money in 1580. Ambrose Smith died in 1584.

== Marriage and family ==
Ambrose Smith married Jane Cooe or Coe, daughter of John Coe of Coxhall, or Coggeshall, Essex. Their children included:

- Henry Smith of Withcote, who married Anne, a daughter of Henry Skipwith. They were the parents of Henry Smith (regicide).
- Dorothy Smith, who married (1) Benedict Barnham, (2) John Pakington, (3) Robert Needham, 1st Viscount Kilmorey, (4) Thomas Erskine, 1st Earl of Kellie. She was the mother of Alice Barnham who married Francis Bacon.
- Elizabeth Smith, who married Martin Calthorpe of Antingham, Norfolk (died 1615), son of the Lord Mayor of London, Martin Calthorp and Jane Heath.
- Francis Smith, who married Elizabeth Taylor, daughter of the haberdasher John Taylor
- Isabell Smith, after her father's death, in 1587, her husband wrote to Francis Walsingham for assistance.
- Margaret Smith, who married Thomas Wilkes
- Sir William Smith, who married Elizabeth Skinner, daughter of Thomas Skinner.

Ambrose's brother, Erasmus Smith of Husbands Bosworth, was the father of Henry Smith (1560-1591), and grandfather of the merchant Erasmus Smith (1611–1691).
