= John Pakington (died 1625) =

Courtier of Elizabeth I and James I

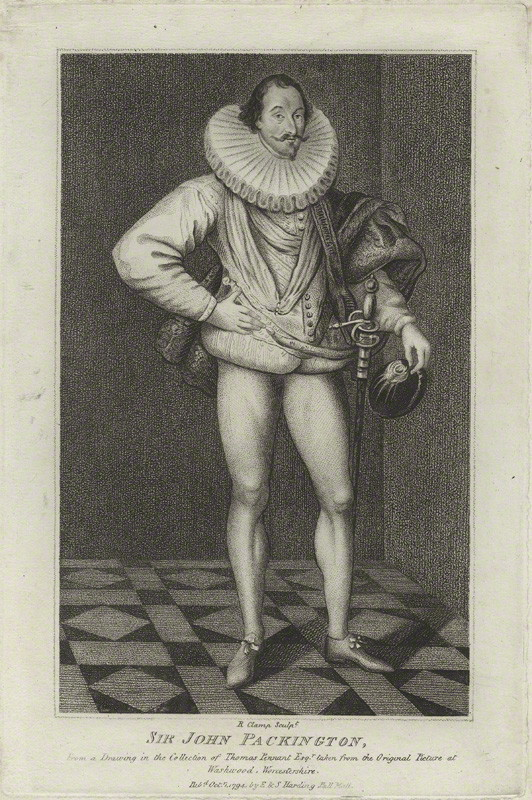

Sheriff of Worcestershire
- In office 1595, 1607

Personal details
- Born: 1549
- Died: 18 January 1625
- Spouse: Dorothy Smith
- Children: 3, including John
- Parents: Thomas Pakington (father); Dorothy Kitson (mother)
- Nickname: Lusty Pakington

Sir John Pakington (1549 – 18 January 1625) of Aylesbury was a courtier in the reigns of Elizabeth I and James I. He was a favourite of Elizabeth's who nicknamed him "Lusty Pakington" for his physique and sporting abilities. Away from court he held a number of official positions including Sheriff of Worcestershire in 1595 and in 1607.

== Biography ==
John Pakington was the eldest son of Sir Thomas Pakington (died 2 June 1571) of Hampton Lovett, Worcestershire, and Dorothy (1531–1577), the daughter of Sir Thomas Kitson of Hengrave Hall, Suffolk, by his second wife, Margaret Donnington. John was educated at Christ Church, Oxford, was graduated B.A. on 13 December 1569, and was a student of Lincoln's Inn in 1570.

Pakington attracted the notice of Queen Elizabeth in her progress to Worcester in August 1570, when she invited him to court. In London, he lived for a few years in great splendour, and outran his fortune. He was remarkable both for his wit and the beauty of his person. The Queen, who took great pleasure in his athletic achievements, nicknamed him "Lusty Pakington". It is said that he once laid a wager with three other courtiers to swim from the Palace of Westminster to London Bridge, but the Queen forbade the match.

From 1587 to 1601, Pakington was deputy-lieutenant for Worcester. In 1587, he was knighted. In 1593, he was granted by the crown a patent for starch.

The Queen, to help him in his financial difficulties, made him bow-bearer of Malvern Chase, and is said to have given him a valuable estate in Suffolk; but when he went to the place and saw the distress of the widow of the former owner, he begged to have the property transferred to her. Strict economy and a period of retirement enabled him to pay his debts, and a wealthy marriage in 1598 (see below) greatly improved his position. Pakington devoted much attention to building, and to improving his estates in Worcestershire.

The central portion of the house at Westwood, which after the Civil War became the residence of the family, was Pakington's work. He also constructed a lake at Westwood, which unfortunately encroached on the highway. His right to alter the road being questioned, he impetuously had the embankments cut through, and the waters of his lake streamed over the country and coloured the Severn for miles.

Pakington was Sheriff of Worcestershire in 1595 and in 1607. In June 1603, he entertained James I with great magnificence at his house at Aylesbury. In 1607, Pakington, as justice of the peace for Worcestershire, resisted the jurisdiction claimed by the council of Wales over the county.

Pakington died in January 1625, and was buried at Aylesbury.

== Family ==
In November 1598, Pakington married Dorothy (died 1639), daughter of Ambrose Smith (Queen Elizabeth's silkman), and widow of Benedict Barnham. With her he had two daughters and a son.

Of their three children, Anne, their elder daughter, married at Kensington, on 9 February 1619, Sir Humphrey Ferrers, son of Sir John Ferrers of Tamworth Castle, Warwickshire; and, after his decease, Philip Stanhope, 1st Earl of Chesterfield. Their second daughter, Mary, married Sir Richard Brooke of Nacton in Suffolk.

The only son, John (1600–1624), was created a baronet in June 1620, and sat in parliament for Aylesbury in 1623–1624. He married Frances, daughter of Sir John Ferrers of Tamworth, with whom he had two children, including his heir Sir John Pakington, 2nd Baronet (1620–1680).

The union between Sir John and Lady Pakington was not a happy one. Early in 1607 Sir John "and his little violent lady … parted upon foul terms". In 1617, she appealed to the law, and Pakington was forced to appear before the court of high commission, and was committed to gaol. It was the unpleasant duty of the Attorney General, Francis Bacon (who had married Lady Pakington's daughter, Alice Barnham), to give an opinion against his mother-in-law. Dorothy outlived her husband and married a further two times.

== Sources ==
- Corder, Joan, ed. (1981). The Visitation of Suffolk, 1561. Vol. I. London: Whittaker and Co. pp. 58–62. ISBN 9780950020747.
- This article incorporates text from a publication now in the public domain: Porter, Bertha (1895). "Pakington, John (1549-1625)". In Lee, Sidney (ed.). Dictionary of National Biography. Vol. 43. London: Smith, Elder & Co. pp. 88–89.
  - Burke's Peerage, art. 'Hampton'
  - Stow's Survey, vol. i. bk. iii. p. 29;
  - Wotton's Baronetage, ed. Edward Kimber and Richard Johnson, i. pp. 180–186;
  - Bacon's Works, ed. Spedding, Ellis, Heath, vii. 569–85, xi. 13–14;
  - Lipscomb's Buckinghamshire, iii. 375;
  - Nash's Worcestershire, vol. i. p. xviii;
  - Metcalfe's Knights, pp. 113, 221;
  - Foster's Alumni Oxon. 1500–1714;
  - Nichols's Progresses of Queen Elizabeth, iv. 76 et seq.;
  - Strype's Ecclesiastical Memorials, vol. iii. pt. ii. p. 181;
  - Cal. of State Papers, Dom. Ser. 1603–10 p. 398, 1611–18 p. 475;
  - Official List of M.P.'s, vol. i. pp. xxix, 456;
  - Orridge's Citizens of London, pp. 168–70;
  - Hepworth Dixon's Personal Hist. of Lord Bacon, pp. 139, 145, 146, 154, 243–244;
  - Lloyd's State Worthies, pp. 616–17 (a glowing character of Pakington);
  - Gent. Mag. 1828, pt. ii. p. 197;
  - Bishop of London's Marriage Licences (Harl. Soc. Publ. xxv.), p. 256;
  - Registers of Kensington (Harl. Soc. Publ. xvi.), p. 67.

Political offices
Preceded by Sir John Lyttelton	Custos Rotulorum of Worcestershire bef. 1594 – 1623	Succeeded by Sir John Pakington, 1st Bt
