= Roger Ratcliffe =

English courtier (died 1537)

Roger Ratcliffe (died 1537) was an English courtier.

== Career ==
Ratcliffe was in the service of Margaret, Countess of Richmond, and in February 1510 was rewarded with the office of Bailiff of Fremington in Devon. He had joined the household of Catherine of Aragon as a gentleman usher of her chamber, with George Fraunces. He was granted the lands of Withcote and Sewey, the properties of his wife's first husband, and made Ranger of Rutland Forest. In 1520 he attended her at the Field of the Cloth of Gold as a gentleman usher.

By 1522 his brother Geoffrey Ratcliffe held lands at Rockingham. Roger Ratciffe was described as a gentleman usher of the privy chamber to Henry VIII with Anthony Knyvett in the Eltham Ordinance of 1526.

He went to Scotland in 1524 with Doctor Magnus to meet the king's sister Margaret Tudor. Ratcliffe's role was to amuse her son, the young James V of Scotland. They brought Henry's gift to Margaret, a length of cloth of gold, and a sword for James. They saw the king dance, sing, ride, run with a spear, and his other excellent "princely actes and doinggs". The mission was managed by Cardinal Wolsey.

Ratcliffe was Sheriff of Leicestershire and Warwickshire in 1529.

He died in 1537.

== Family ==
Ratcliffe married Catherine, widow of William Smith alias Heriz, and daughter of William Ashby. She brought him the property of Withcote, where her first husband had commenced building a mansion and chapel. After his death, Withcote was inherited by his stepson John Smith and his son Roger, and Ratcliffe left him his bed of velvet and chamlet silk paned.

It is thought that Mary, Queen of Scots stopped at Withcote, then owned by Henry Smith, a son of Roger Smith's younger brother, the London mercer and silkman Ambrose Smith, on her way to Fotheringhay Castle. Ambrose Smith had supplied velvet, satin, and taffeta to Elizabeth I. Henry Smith's sister was Dorothy, Lady Pakington, in 1586 Mrs Barnham. She later married a Scottish courtier, the Earl of Kellie.

The preacher and author Henry Smith (1560-1591) was a son of Erasmus Smith of Husbands Bosworth, and a nephew of Ambrose Smith. His nephew was the merchant Erasmus Smith (1611–1691).

== Withcote Hall and Chapel ==
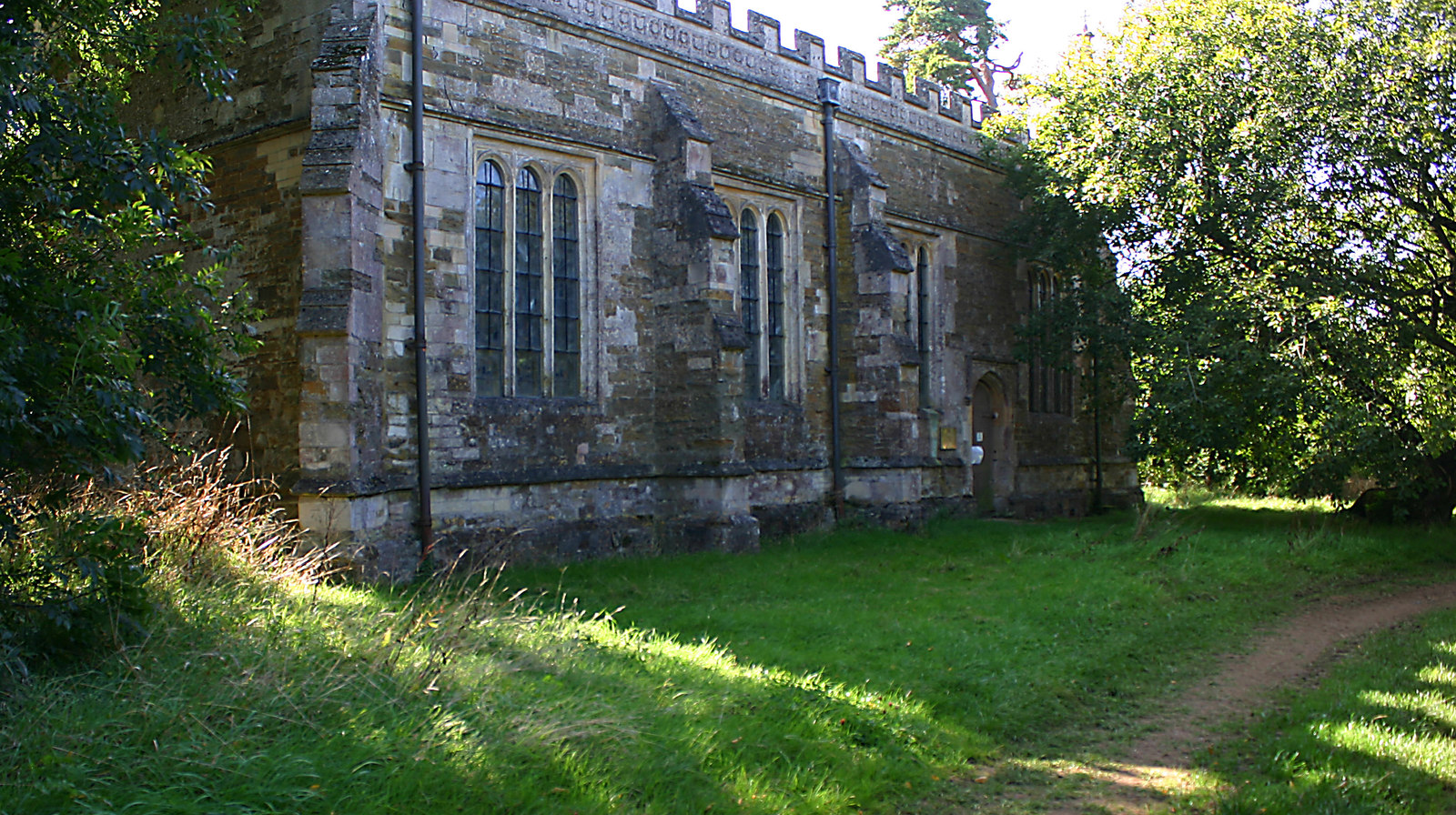
Withcote Chapel, Churches Conservation Trust

Ratcliffe completed building work at Withcote Hall in Leicestershire, near Oakham, now demolished. Around the year 1534 Henry VIII allowed him to bring building materials from Rockingham Castle, where his brother Geoffrey had a lease of the site. This was recorded in a family memorial of Edward Watson, who acquired Rockingham in 1544. John Leland mentioned "Mr Radeclif's right goodly house" at Withcote in 1539, "one of the fairest houses in Leicestershire", occupied by John Smith who had married Dorothy Cave, a sister of Ambrose Cave and Bryan Cave.

The famous stained glass windows in the chapel at Withcote have been attributed to the Flemish glazier Galyon Hone. They include the phoenix and castle badge of Jane Seymour and the heraldry of Ratcliffe and his family. It used to be thought that Ratcliffe had acquired the glass from Owston or Osulveston Priory, but it seems more likely that he employed the court glazier to complete the chapel. Ratcliffe's will lists textile furnishings for the parish church of Withcote. After Ratcliffe's death, in 1538 Owston Abbey was granted to John Harington, esquire of the king's body.
