= John Garrard =

City of London merchant and landowner

Sir John Garrard
- Born: c. 1546
- Died: 7 May 1625
- Occupations: City of London merchant; Lord Mayor of London
- Spouse: Jane Partridge
- Children: John, Benedict, Anne, Elizabeth, Ursula, and others.

Sir John Garrard, sometimes spelled Gerrard (c. 1546 – 7 May 1625), was a merchant and alderman of the City of London, six times Master of the Worshipful Company of Haberdashers, a Buckinghamshire landowner, and Lord Mayor of London for the year 1601 to 1602.

== Life ==
Garrard was a younger son of Sir William Garrard or Garret, Haberdasher (1518-1571), of Dorney Court, Buckinghamshire, who bought the manor of Dorney in 1542, and became Lord Mayor of London in 1555. His mother was Isabel, daughter of Julian Nethermill, of Coventry, and his paternal grandfather was John Gerrard, alias Garret, of Sittingbourne.

He was born about 1546, if his tomb correctly recorded his age at death. His father, Sir William, died in 1571, to be succeeded by the elder son, another (Sir) William Garrard (died 1607). This William, who married a daughter of Sir Thomas Rowe, inherited the estate at Dorney.

John Garrard was admitted to the Worshipful Company of Haberdashers. He married Jane, the daughter of Richard Partridge, a citizen of the City of London, and with her had thirteen children, including John (born about 1585), Benedict, Anne, Elizabeth, Ursula, Jane (baptized 1602), and at least two other daughters, these eight surviving infancy. At least four other children died young: a son named John, who was born and died in 1597; Margaret (the twin of Jane), who was baptized in May 1602 and died in June 1603; another John, who was baptized in December 1604; and a son, Thomas.

=== Civic career ===
Having served as Treasurer to St Thomas' Hospital from 1582 to 1591, and as Auditor in 1591-1592, in June 1591 John Garrard was appointed Treasurer, with Benedict Barnham, for the sum of £7,400 to be raised by the City for the furnishing of six ships of war and a pinnace, towards the expedition of Sir Walter Ralegh of 1591-1592. In 1592-1593 he was elected to his first term as Master of the Haberdashers, and in the same year, being then elected alderman for Aldgate ward, was immediately chosen one of the two Sheriffs of the City of London (during the mayoralty of Sir William Rowe).

Becoming Master for his second term in 1601-1602, at Michaelmas 1601 he was elected Lord Mayor of London (the term of office being for one year), and was knighted in 1602. In 1603 William Smith, Rouge Dragon Pursuivant, noted: "He dwelleth in St Martin's Lane, between Canwickstrete and the Olde Swanne." In 1606 he exchanged the ward of Aldgate for that of Candlewick, representing the latter until his death in 1625. Garrard was elected Master of his Company again for 1607-1608, 1611-1612, 1614-1615 and 1617-1618. President of St Thomas' Hospital from 1606 to 1622, he was appointed Surveyor-General of Hospitals in 1611.

William Jones (died 1615), citizen and Haberdasher, a merchant of Hamburg, placed £6,000 during his lifetime and by his will a further £3,000 in the hands of the Haberdashers Company towards the foundation of Monmouth Free Grammar School, and for almshouses for twenty poor old diseased, blind or lame people, in Monmouth. As trustees on behalf of the Company, Sir John Garrard and Sir Thomas Rowe, aldermen, and Robert Offley and Martin Bond, citizens and Haberdashers, obtained a licence from King James I in 1614 to purchase land to the value of £200 a year towards this charity. They purchased the manor of Hatcham-Barnes, in Deptford St Paul (formerly an endowment of Dartford Priory, a nunnery), which long remained a part of Jones's Monmouth Charity.

Sir John's name heads the list of "Honourable Senators" among the patrons of the new parish church of Trinity Christ-church, also called the "Temple of St James" (i.e. St James Duke's Place), built in the ruins of Holy Trinity Priory in Aldgate, who were present at the official consecration on the morrow of New Year's Day (i.e. 26 March) in the mayoralty of Sir Peter Probie (1622-1623). A prime mover in the development was Sir Edward Barkham, lord mayor 1621-1622, whose eldest daughter Elizabeth had married Sir John Garrard's son John in 1611. Another benefactor was Sir Thomas Rowe. The church was new-built to accommodate the inhabitants of "The Duke's Place", who had formerly resorted to the old St Katherine Christchurch nearby.

=== Estates ===
According to Cussans, the manor of Lamer, near Wheathampstead, was sold to Sir William Garrard by a member of the Boteler family during the reign of Edward VI. John Nichols stated that King James I visited alderman Sir John Garrard at his seat of Lamer, on 19 July 1608. Sir John refers to his house of Lamer in his will of 1625. Lamer, or Delamer, became the seat of the Garrard baronets, the first of whom, John Garrard son of the lord mayor John, was knighted in 1614 and created baronet in 1623. This younger John held the manor of Wheathampstead, together with its mill, by lease from the Dean and Chapter of Westminster. The term of three lives, referred initially to himself, of Dame Elizabeth his wife, and of his brother Benedict: following Elizabeth Garrard's death (1632), the lifetime of their son John Garrard was added to the term of the contract. Bride Hall, Wheathampstead, was put into the hands of trustees for Sir John in 1608. Sir John Garrard jun., Bart., son of Sir John Garrard, had licence of entry upon lands in Hertfordshire and elsewhere on 20 June 1626 for 1 May 1627.

The manor of Southfleet in Kent had been acquired by Sir William Garrard (senr.) in 1545-46. In 1603 (29 January 45 Eliz), Sir William Gerrard (junr.) of Dorney secured a definitive decree of possession of the manor of Southfleet, which he had previously enjoyed for fifty-seven years (claiming from the 36th and 37th years of Henry VIII, when the King had conveyed the manor to Sir William Petre, who in 1 Edward VI conveyed it to Sir William Garrard), against the Dean and Chapter of Rochester. Lord Keeper Egerton made an example of the defendants, whom he considered had deliberately and craftily concealed an inconsistency in the original enrolment in order to deprive Garrard of his title. Sir William Garrard junr. died in 1607, differences with his son Thomas remaining unresolved: Sir John Garrard disposed of Southfleet to Sir William Sedley (died 1618) of Aylesford.

=== Death and monument ===
On 24 January 1616, Garrard's wife died; Garrard himself died on 7 May 1625, to be buried with his wife, and like his father, in the church of St Magnus-the-Martyr, London. A monument to him, erected by his son Benedict Gerrard in 1629, survives there, and bears the following inscription:

Here lieth interred the Bodies of Sir John Gerrard, Knt., and Dame Jane, his wife, who was Daughter to Richard Partridge, Citizen and Haberdasher of London, by whom he had 13 children; five whereof died young. They lived comfortably together, 43 years. He was Lord-Mayor of London, in the year 1601. She departed this Life the 24 Jan. 1616; and he left this world, the 7 of May 1625, being 79 years old, leaving only 2 Sons and six Daughters behind him. This Monument was erected at the Charges of Benedict Gerrard, Gent., his youngest Son, 1629.

The younger son, Benedict, was appointed executor in his father's will. The will refers to houses and tenements nearby to his great mansion in St Martin's Lane, and to a tenement in Soper Lane, and also to the manor of Exhall and to lands and tenements in Coventry and elsewhere in Staffordshire and Warwickshire which had come to him from the Nethermyll family. He clearly refers to his house called Lamer and other his lands in Hertfordshire, the contents of which he has already bargained and sold to his son Sir John Garrard the younger.

A full-length portrait by Daniel Mytens is in the Guildhall Art Gallery.

=== Garrard of Lamer ===
His son and heir Sir John Garrard, or Gerrard, was created the first baronet in 1623 (see Garrard baronets).

== Arms ==
Garrard's arms were blazoned "argent, on a fess gules, a lion passant, argent; a crescent for difference".

In the church of Ifield, Kent (near Northfleet), in the east window, the arms were represented quarterly as follows:

- 1 and 4: Argent, on a fess sable, a lion of the field
- 2 and 3: Argent, a chevron between three crescents azure, differenced with a mullet or. (Nethermyll)
- Over all, a crescent gules.
- Crest: On a wreath, a leopard seiant proper.

"These are the arms of Sir John Garrard, lord mayor of London in the reign of queen Elizabeth; and are likewise in the windows of Ifield Court."

Civic offices
Preceded by Benedict Barnham; William Ryder	Sheriffs of the City of London; 1593–1594; With: Robert Taylor	Succeeded by Paul Banning; Peter Hanton
Preceded by William Ryder	Lord Mayor of London; 1601	Succeeded by Robert Lee
