= Robert Needham =

Robert Needham may refer to:

- Robert Needham, 1st Viscount Kilmorey (c. 1565–1631), English politician, MP for Shropshire
- Robert Needham, 2nd Viscount Kilmorey (c. 1591–1653), MP for Newcastle-under-Lyme, 1614, son of the above
- Sir Robert Needham (Haverfordwest MP), MP for Haverfordwest, 1645–1648

== See also ==
- Robert Nedham (1703–1762), British-Jamaican plantation owner and MP for Old Sarum, 1734–1741
- Robert Needham Cust (1821–1909), British administrator and judge in India
- Robert Needham Philips (1815–1890), English textile merchant and manufacturer
