= The More =

16th-century palace in Batchworth, Hertfordshire, England

Coordinates: 51.634014°N 0.438408°W

The More (also known as the Manor of the More) was a 16th-century palace in the parish of Rickmansworth, Hertfordshire, England, where Catherine of Aragon lived after the annulment of her marriage to Henry VIII. It had been owned by Cardinal Wolsey. It lay at the northeast corner of the later More Park estate on the edge of the Colne flood plain. The Treaty of the More was celebrated here by Henry VIII and the French ambassadors. In 1527, the French ambassador, Jean du Bellay, thought the house more splendid than Hampton Court. Nothing now remains above ground. The site is a scheduled ancient monument.

== History ==
The site was inhabited by the 12th century. The house came to Wolsey as a possession of the Abbey of St Albans in 1515 and passed to Henry VIII in 1531. By the mid-16th century, there was a timber-framed long gallery 15 feet broad and 253 feet in length. Most of the house was made of brick. Catherine of Aragon came to live at the More in the winter of 1531–32. The house was redecorated by the painter John Hethe with the Queen's badges (the ciphers of Anne Boleyn) in 1534. In 1541, Hethe painted the king's bedchamber with blue bice and fine colours. Stained glass was installed by Galyon Hone. Provision was made in 1542 for the King's archery and two deer barns were built. There were two grandstands to watch the hunting. It seems that the building was abandoned after 1556 and may have had inadequate foundations.

The royal inventory of 1547 listed 157 items at the More in the care of Richard Hobbes. Ten of the suites of tapestry had borders with Wolsey's coat-of-arms. Two crimson velvet chairs were embroidered and carved with Anne Boleyn's initials.

Remedial work was attempted between 1547 and 1552. A detailed survey was taken in 1568. In 1576, Francis Russell, 2nd Earl of Bedford leased the house. He apparently decided the house was not worth restoring and in 1598 it was recorded as being in ruins. The house was finally demolished in 1661.

In about 1617, Edward Russell, 3rd Earl of Bedford built a new house on the hill to the southwest, within the deer park. Lucy Russell, Countess of Bedford, described her building and improvements at Moor Park in a letter to a friend: "...my works at the More, where I have been a patcher this summer, and I am still adding some trifles of pleasure to that place I am so much in love with, as, if I were so fond of any man, I were in hard case." This house was replaced by the present Moor Park.

The site was partly excavated between 1952 and 1955. It is currently buried under a metre of imported top soil placed to provide a level playing field for Northwood Preparatory School, renamed Merchant Taylors' Prep, which lies immediately to the east. Two stone pillars with Renaissance period carvings were discovered while scrub was being cleared in the school grounds in 2010. The site was also the subject of an episode of the archaeology TV programme Time Team in 2012.

== Bibliography ==
- Historic England. "Details from listed building database (1015595)". National Heritage List for England. (Legacy Scheduled Monument Number 29381.)
- English Heritage (PastScape) Defra or Monument number(s) 395304.
- County Historic Environment Record (or Sites and Monuments Record) number(s) 829; 10919.
- Renn, D.F., 1971, Medieval Castles in Hertfordshire (Chichester: Phillimore) p. 22
- Salter, Mike, 2002, The Castles of The Thames Valley and The Chilterns (Malvern: Folly Publications) p. 49 (slight)
- Thurley, Simon, 1993, The Royal Palaces of Tudor England (Yale University Press) p. 44, 50, 58, 74, 78, 114–5, 173, 192, 193
- Keevill, Graham D., 2000, Medieval Palaces, An Archaeology (Stroud; Tempus) p. 30, 62–4, 70, 154, 163
