= Edward Barkham (Lord Mayor) =

English merchant; Lord Mayor of London (r. 1621)

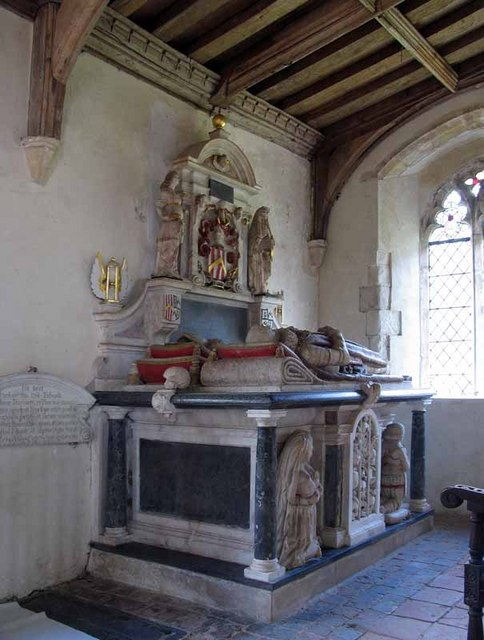
Monument with effigy of Sir Edward Barkham and his wife, St George's Church, South Acre, Norfolk. Arms of Barkham: Argent, three pales gules overall a chevron or

Sir Edward Barkham (c. 1552 - 15 January 1633/34) was an English merchant who was Lord Mayor of London in 1621. He derived from the Barkham family of South Acre, Norfolk.

== Origins and young life ==
Edward Barkham, the future lord mayor, was the son of Edward Barkham (died 1599/1600) of South Acre, Norfolk, and his second wife, Elizabeth Rolfe. He had an elder half-brother, Thomas, by his father's first marriage, and a full brother named Robert, and also two sisters, Margaret (died 1625), who married Henry Gallard (died 1614) of Norwich, and Mary, who married Edmond Hudson of Castle Acre. Edward was born in about 1552.

Barkham married Jane, daughter of John Crouch (died 1605, aged 86) of Corneybury, Layston, Hertfordshire, and his wife Joan, daughter and heir of John Scott of London. John Crouch, or Crowch, and his wife have a monument with a lengthy and informative inscription reciting the names and marriages of their surviving children, which was set up in the (now deconsecrated) church of St Bartholomew, Layston. The chapel of Alswick in Layston was, before the Dissolution of the monasteries, a possession of Holy Trinity Priory in Aldgate, London, and was held together with the manor of Corneybury and the church of St Bartholomew at Layston. This connection is probably significant in the light of Barkham's later role in rebuilding a church at the site of the former Aldgate priory (see below). He and his wife had many children: his eldest son, Edward, was born c. 1591.

== Civic career ==
Barkham was a city of London merchant belonging to the Worshipful Company of Leathersellers. He was Master of the Leathersellers Company from 1605 to 1606, and from 1608 to 1609. On 28 February 1611, he was elected an alderman of the City of London for Farringdon Within ward. He was Sheriff of London from 1611 to 1612, a service which paved the way for his future election as lord mayor.

Owing to the customary requirement that the lord mayor should be a member of one of the "Great Twelve" livery companies, it became necessary for Barkham to negotiate the transfer of his membership from the Leathersellers to the Worshipful Company of Drapers. Although it was prestigious for a Company to be represented by the lord mayor, it also incurred notable expenses, and the Drapers were reluctant to make the admission, having very recently admitted two others for the same cause. However Barkham's move was made, late in 1621, and he was duly elected to the mayoralty. On 29 October his inauguration was celebrated with a pageant devised by Thomas Middleton. Exercising his mayoral prerogative, Barkham moved as alderman to the Cheap ward in that year. He was knighted on 16 June 1622 and became Master of the Drapers Company for the year 1622 to 1623.

On 3 July 1622 Sir Edward Barkham, Lord Mayor, and Sir Heneage Finch, Recorder, at a motion of the Court of the Virginia Company of London, "...in regarde of their well wishinge of this Plantacon and readines to doe this Companie seruice this Court haue made them free [and] of the Counsell." This admission was simultaneous with those of Lord Marquess Hamilton, Dr Donne, Sir Edward Conway, Sir Henry Mildmay and Sir Thomas Coventry.

He was a prime mover in the development of the new parish church of Trinity Christ-church, also called the "Temple of St James" (i.e. St James Duke's Place), built in the ruins of Holy Trinity Priory in Aldgate. The church was new-built to accommodate the inhabitants of "The Duke's Place", who had formerly resorted to the old St Katherine Christchurch nearby. It was (says Anthony Munday) officially consecrated in a civic ceremony on the morrow of New Year's Day in the mayoralty of Sir Peter Probie (1622–1623). Barkham's arms appeared in glass together with those of the City in the east window, and a lengthy verse inscription celebrating his re-edification of the church was attached to the south wall of the chancel.

Between 1594 and 1601 Edward Barkham, citizen and Leatherseller, purchased the manor of Quarmby, in West Yorkshire, from the Blyth family: the manor and its mansion remained in his hands until his death in 1634, when it was sold by the first baronet to Thomas Thornhill of Fixby. Extensive land acquisitions were made by Sir Edward and his successors in Wainfleet All Saints, Wainfleet St Mary, Ingoldmells and Friskney, Lincolnshire, from the 1590s onwards. These are itemized in an Estate Book which is the subject of a recent research project. Early surveys were conducted in 1609 (Adlard Hubberd) and 1610 (the Landlawer). The second son, Sir Robert Barkham of Wainfleet, obtained a baronetcy in the 1660s. He held a share of interest in the estates at Tottenham acquired by his father.

== Death and monument ==
Sir Edward died on 15 January 1633/4, in his 82nd year, at his house in the parish of St Mary Bothaw near Dowgate, and his body was conveyed to South Acre in Norfolk for burial, where he had erected a monument for himself and his wife during his lifetime. The monument at South Acre has no surviving inscription but is certainly to the lord mayor, because his recumbent effigy is shown wearing the magisterial gown and chain over a suit of armour. Francis Blomefield, who described the monument, made the mayor (who was knighted on 16 June 1622) to be the same Edward Barkham who was created 1st baronet in 1623, (an identification which is repeated elsewhere). However, as the Funeral Certificate makes entirely clear, that baronetcy was in fact first granted (on 28 June 1623) to the younger Sir Edward (1591–1667), son and heir of the persons above commemorated, and he was knighted two days later, at Greenwich. Many have been misled by this confusion.

== Family ==
Barkham married Jane, daughter of John Crouch (died 1605, aged 86) of Corneybury, Layston, Hertfordshire, and his wife Joan, daughter and heir of John Scott of London. His children are shown in the London Visitation of 1633–1635 as follows:

- Sir Edward Barkham, 1st Baronet, of South Acre (1591–1667), MP, married Frances, daughter of Sir Thomas Berney of Reedham, Norfolk. (issue)
- John Barkham (2 son), died an infant.
- (Sir) Robert Barkham (died 1661), of Tottenham and of Wainfleet, Lincolnshire; he married Mary Wilcocks of London and they had issue a son Edward and four daughters.
- John Barkham (4 son), died young without issue.
- Thomas Barkham (5 son), died young without issue.
- Hugh Barkham (6 son), died young without issue.
- Jane Barkham (eldest daughter), died young without issue.
- Elizabeth Barkham, married Sir John Garrard's son John (afterwards Sir John Gerrard, 1st Baronet, of Lamer, Wheathampstead, Hertfordshire) in 1611. (issue)
- Susanna Barkham (died 1622), married Robert Walpole (1593–1663) of Houghton juxta Harpley, Norfolk. They are buried at Houghton. Their son was Edward Walpole (died 1668), grandfather of Prime Minister Robert Walpole.
- Jane Barkham, married Sir Charles Caesar of Benington, Hertfordshire. (issue)
- Margaret Barkham (died 1640), married Sir Anthony Irby (died 1682) of Boston, Lincolnshire. Monument to Margaret and three daughters at Tottenham High Cross.

His wife Jane (Crouch) and son Edward were executors of his last will and testament.

Civic offices
Preceded by Sir Francis Jones	Lord Mayor of the City of London; 1621	Succeeded by Peter Probie
