= Dorothy Smith, Lady Pakington =

The Right Honourable The Countess of Kellie
- Born: Dorothy Smith
- Died: 1639
- Spouses: Benedict Barnham (m. 1583; died 1598) Sir John Pakington (m. 1598; died 1625) Robert Needham, 1st Viscount Kilmorey (m. 1629; died 1631) Thomas Erskine, 1st Earl of Kellie (m. 1631; died 1639)
- Children: 11, including Alice and John
- Father: Ambrose Smith

Dorothy Erskine, Countess of Kellie (née Smith, formerly Barnham, Pakington, and Needham; died 1639) was a public figure. While married to John Pakington, a favourite of Queen Elizabeth I, she was involved in a matrimonial dispute that was heard in front of the Attorney General, Francis Bacon who was also her son-in-law.

== Biography ==
Dorothy was the daughter of Ambrose Smith of Withcote, Leicestershire, and of Cheapside (silkman to Queen Elizabeth), by his wife Jane Cooe. She married Benedict Barnham at St Clement Eastcheap on 28 April 1583. They had eight children. Three girls and a boy died in infancy. The remaining four girls lived to marry. Elizabeth, the eldest married Mervyn Tuchet, 2nd Earl of Castlehaven, Alice married Sir Francis Bacon in 1606, Dorothy married Sir John Constable of Gray's Inn and of Dromby, Yorkshire, and Bridget married Sir William Soame of Thurlow, Suffolk.

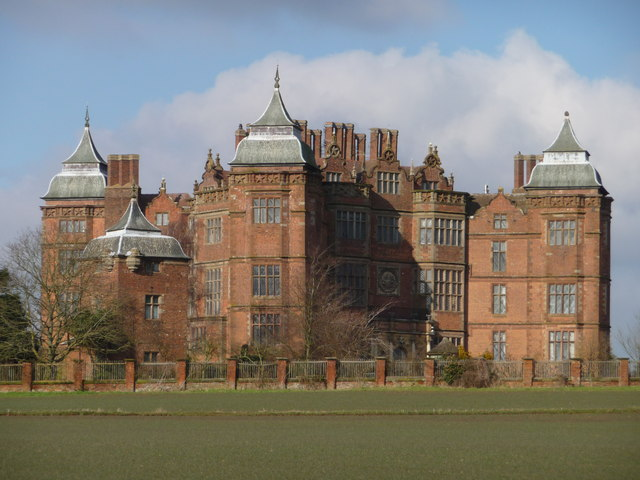
Westwood House home of John Pakington

When Barnham died in 1598 he left an estate of £20,000 of whom the chief beneficiaries were Dorothy and her daughters. Within two years Dorothy had remarried. Her second husband was Sir John Pakington (a favourite of Queen Elizabeth) whom she married in November 1598. His home was at Hampton Lovett and he built Westwood House near Droitwich. They had two daughters and a son.

Anne, Dorothy's elder daughter by her second husband, married at Kensington, on 9 February 1619, Sir Humphrey Ferrers, son of Sir John Ferrers of Tamworth Castle, Warwickshire; and, after his decease, Philip Stanhope, 1st Earl of Chesterfield. Her second daughter by her second marriage, Mary, married Sir Richard Brooke of Nacton in Suffolk. The only son of the second marriage, John (1600–1624), was created a baronet in June 1620, and sat in Parliament for Aylesbury in 1623–1624. He married Frances, daughter of Sir John Ferrers of Tamworth, with whom he had two children, including his heir Sir John Pakington, 2nd Baronet (1620–1680)

The union between Dorothy and Sir John was not a happy one and early in 1607 Pakington "and his little violent lady … parted upon foul terms". King James wrote to the Archbishop of Canterbury about the case. He had sent letters to John Pakington urging him to reconcile with his wife. Pakington insisted his wife was at fault. The King hoped the Archbishop, who was overseer or administrator of Benedict Barnham's will, would be able to bring them back together.

Dorothy moved to London, and her troubles were increased with manoeuvres to marry off her daughters. In November 1607 she wrote to the Earl of Salisbury from her lodging in Drury Lane thanking him for taking care of two of her daughters. He was Master of the Court of Wards. Salisbury had also helped in the case of her daughter Dorothy aged 12 who Francis Bacon had contracted to marry John Constable, who had recently been knighted. Bacon had written her an "insolent letter of contempt".

In 1617, she appealed to the law, and Pakington was forced to appear before the court of high commission, and was committed to gaol. It was the unpleasant duty of the Attorney General, Francis Bacon (who had married Lady Pakington's daughter, Alice Barnham), to give an opinion against his mother-in-law.

In 1628, Dorothy quarrelled with her sons-in-law respecting the administration of her husband's estate, which was transferred to the sons-in-law in February 1629. In or about 1629 Dorothy took a third husband, Robert Needham, 1st Viscount Kilmorey, who had already married three times, and who died in November 1631.

Subsequently she became the third wife of Thomas Erskine, 1st Earl of Kellie. He died on 12 June 1639, and she is believed to have died that same year.
