= Treaty of the More =

1525 treaty between England and France

The Treaty of the More was concluded on 30 August 1525 between Henry VIII and the interim French government of Louise of Savoy. Although the treaty was sporadically interrupted by hostilities in the 1530s, overall peace was maintained until 1544. It was celebrated by Henry and the French ambassadors at the More, Hertfordshire, a castle owned by Henry's chief minister, Cardinal Wolsey.

England, with Wolsey negotiating, agreed to give up some territorial claims against France, receiving in return a pension from the French of £20,000 a year. France settled what was owed to Henry VIII's sister, Mary, dowager queen of France. England also agreed to work to secure the release of King Francis I of France, then held prisoner by Charles V, Holy Roman Emperor and King of Spain.The negotiations in 1525 marked a shift in Cardinal Thomas Wolsey’s foreign policy. Instead of continuing England’s alliance with the Emperor, Wolsey sought better relations with France after the Battle of Pavia. Historian Garrett Mattingly describes the Treaty of the More as an “early non-aggression pact” that aimed to keep England out of continental wars and maintain balance between France and the Holy Roman Empire. The treaty also reduced tensions with Scotland and showed Wolsey’s preference for peace and financial stability over military expansion. Heightened tensions between the Spanish and French were beneficial to England. The treaty allowed the English to act as an intermediary in trade between the French and the Habsburg Netherlands.

England had been troubled by the threat of a renewal of the "Auld Alliance" between France and Scotland, and France agreed to prevent the Scottish John Stewart, Duke of Albany's return to Scotland.
