= Thomas Wilkes =

Member of the Parliament of England

Sir Thomas Wilkes (c.1545 – 2 March 1598 (N.S in Rouen)) was an English civil servant and diplomat during the reign of Elizabeth I of England. He served as Clerk of the Privy Council, Member of Parliament for Downton and Southampton, and English member of the Council of State of the Netherlands, and on many diplomatic missions for the English government.

== Personal life ==
Little is known of Wilkes' early years. He may have been a native of Sussex. Apparently, he spent eight years in Continental Europe on the Grand Tour after 1564, before he became a probationer-fellow at All Souls College, Oxford in 1572, where he graduated B.A. in February 1573 (N.S.). Wilkes married Margaret Smith, daughter of Ambrose Smith (a London Mercer) and Joan Coe, about 1578, with whom he had a daughter. After her death in 1596 he remarried Frances Savage, daughter of Sir John Savage.

== Career ==
Shortly after graduation, and still a probationer of All Souls, he joined the embassy of Dr. Valentine Dale to France as Dale's secretary. (This caused some difficulty with the College that had to be resolved by Sir Francis Walsingham). In 1574, Queen Elizabeth instructed him to secretly contact the Prince de Condé and the Duke d'Alençon, who had been arrested by the French Queen-mother, Catherine de Medici, to reassure them of her support. Catherine found out and tried to apprehend Wilkes. When he managed to escape to England Queen Elizabeth ordered him to resolve the diplomatic incident or never come back. He returned to France and managed to convince Catherine of his innocence which allowed him to remain in France as an English diplomat.

In February 1575, he was tasked with a mission to the Elector Palatine to convince him to send an army into France to aid the Huguenots under the Prince de Condé. Wilkes followed this army on its campaign in France until the Peace of Monsieur in 1576. He returned to England highly recommended by both Condé and Alençon. He became a Clerk of the Privy Council in July 1576, which office he would hold intermittently till his death.

Soon afterward he was awarded the office of Queen's printer, which he quickly sold to Christopher Barker to augment his income of 40 pounds a year. Later he would receive similar privileges as a reward, which he often quickly sold on. Examples are the salt monopoly for the English east coast he received in 1585 and the lease of Downton rectory, that he eventually sold on to the Raleigh family.

In 1577, Wilkes was sent to Spain and The Netherlands in connection with an attempt to intervene in the Dutch Revolt. He was to assure king Philip II of Spain of Elizabeth's good intentions and to convince him that the new governor-general in the Habsburg Netherlands, Don Juan would best be recalled. Though he was received cordially at the Spanish court, his advice was not taken. On the return voyage he visited both Don Juan and the Prince of Orange in the Netherlands to receive their respective views and report back to Elizabeth.

In 1579, an arrangement was made for a six-monthly rotation of the clerks of the Privy Council, Wilkes' turns being May–August and November–December, but he was available for special commissions during the remainder of the year. In his capacity as clerk of the Privy Council Wilkes undertook many tasks, big and small. In 1581 for instance, he engaged in the interrogation under torture of the Jesuit priest Edmund Campion in this context, and in 1583 he investigated the conspiracy of Arden, Somerville, and Hall.

In the mid-1580s, Wilkes embarked on a career as a Member of Parliament. In 1584 he was returned by Downton and in 1586 Southampton offered him a seat, though he had himself reelected by Downton that year (possibly because he was about to be sent abroad again). Southampton elected him in 1589 and 1593, however. Apparently, he did not attend the first three Parliaments he was elected to (or no activity is known), but in 1593 he was put on several committees, among which the subsidy committee.

In 1586, Wilkes was sent to the Dutch Republic to accompany the Earl of Leicester and keep an eye on him. Wilkes maintained a secret correspondence with the Queen's Secretary of State and spymaster, Sir Francis Walsingham, in which Leicester was known as Themistocles, that grew increasingly critical of the policies of the Earl. In 1587, Wilkes was appointed to the Dutch Council of State as the successor to Henry Killigrew. In his capacity as a member of the Council, he addressed the States of Holland with a "Remonstrance" in which he defended the policy of the Earl to oppose the Regenten and promote the democratic (and extreme Calvinist) factions with an appeal to popular sovereignty "by default of a legal Prince." This prompted the States to a response, written by François Vranck, that would become an important ideological statement of the principles of the (largely unwritten) "constitution" of the Dutch Republic. Though Wilkes' approach was rejected, his intervention thus occasioned an important development in the founding of the Dutch Republic. Meanwhile, relations with Leicester (who had become aware of the criticism behind his back from Wilkes and his colleague Lord Buckhurst) grew increasingly tense and in June 1587, Wilkes returned to England without permission from the Queen, who had him imprisoned for a while in the Fleet Prison. Though he was soon released his disgrace lasted for two years.

Only in August 1589 was Wilkes able to take up his work as clerk of the Privy Council again (apparently he was even briefly considered as Secretary of State after the death of Walsingham in 1590. In the last years of his life, he was often sent on important diplomatic missions. So was he employed in a mission to France in March–July 1592 during which the new king Henri IV (formerly the Prince de Condé) knighted him for his services (his was therefore a foreign knighthood). At the end of this mission he managed to conclude an alliance with France despite the conversion of the king to Catholicism.

In September 1594, he was entrusted with a mission to Brussels to obtain from the government of the Spanish Netherlands the extradition of a number of people implicated in the conspiracy of the Queen's physician, dr. López, but this mission was aborted for diplomatic reasons.

== Death ==
In February 1598, Wilkes was sent on another diplomatic mission to France with Sir Robert Cecil. Before he left for France he made his will, which shows that despite (or maybe because of) his sale of the offices he had been awarded, he had not been able to amass a great fortune. He left only small bequests to his infant daughter and servant, the residue of the estate going to his new wife.

Wilkes was already ill (possibly of an accident) when Cecil and he landed at Dieppe. Wilkes died from his illness a few weeks later, on 2 March 1598 (N.S.) in Rouen.

Besides the Remonstrance referred to above, Wilkes left A Briefe and Summary Tractate shewing what appertaineth to the Place, Dignity, and Office of a councilor of estate in a Monarchy or other Commonwealth, dedicated to Sir Robert Cecil, as a work of political philosophy.
