= Robert Leslie Ellis =

English polymath (1817-1859)

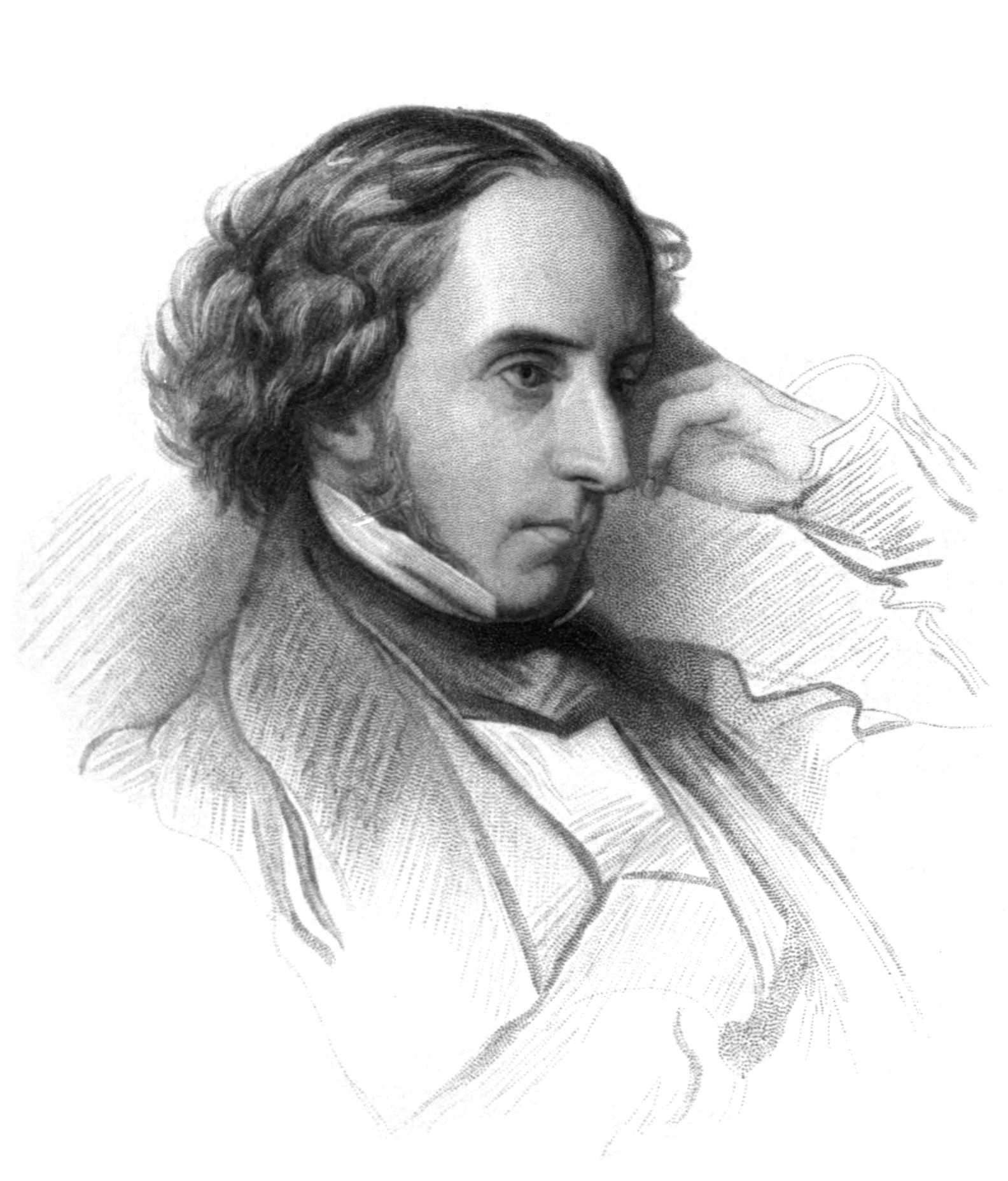
- Robert Leslie Ellis, seated portrait
- Born: 1817
- Died: 1859 (aged 41–42)
- Education: Trinity College, Cambridge; Inner Temple
- Occupation: Literary editor
- Title: Reverend

Robert Leslie Ellis (25 August 1817 – 12 May 1859) was an English polymath, remembered principally as a mathematician and editor of the works of Francis Bacon.

== Biography ==
Robert Leslie Ellis was the youngest of six children of Francis Ellis (1772–1842) of Bath and his wife Mary née Kilbee (1777–1847). He was named after his paternal grandfather Robert Ellis and his wife Penelope née Leslie with ‘Leslie’ being a second surname not a forename.

Educated privately, he entered Trinity College, Cambridge, in 1836, graduating as Senior Wrangler in 1840 and elected Fellow of Trinity shortly afterwards. Although he had also entered the Inner Temple in 1838, was called to the bar in 1840, and later helped William Whewell (his eventual brother-in-law via sister 'Fanny') with jurisprudence, Ellis never practised law. He hoped unsuccessfully for the Cambridge chair of civil law.

Inheriting substantial Irish estates when his father died, estates that had been inherited by his father from his uncle Henry Ellis, Robert Leslie Ellis contemplated entering Parliament as a Whig under Sir William Napier's patronage. Yet his courtship of one of Napier's daughters ended in some confusion: Ellis never married, and never stood for Parliament.

As a mathematician, Ellis founded the Cambridge Mathematical Journal with D. F. Gregory in 1837. He corresponded with Augustus De Morgan on the conjectured four color theorem.

Continental travel failed to restore Ellis' health. An attack of rheumatic fever at Sanremo in 1849 left him an invalid, and he returned to Cambridge, living at Anstey Hall, Trumpington, next to his friend John Grote, vicar of Trumpington. From his sickbed Ellis kept up contact with the young Trinity mathematician William Walton, and dictated his thoughts on a wide range of topics, including etymology, bees' cells, Roman money, the principles of a projected Chinese dictionary, and Boole's The Laws of Thought (1854).

== Works ==
Ellis took on the editing of Francis Bacon's works with two other Trinity fellows, Douglas Denon Heath and James Spedding. Dramatic deterioration of Ellis's health from 1847 left his work on the general prefaces to Bacon's philosophy unfinished. Spedding and Heath completed the Works in seven volumes, published 1857–1859.

Ellis's own major mathematical contributions were on functional and differential equations, and the theory of probability (On the foundations of the theory of probabilities, read to the Cambridge Philosophical Society on 14 February 1842; published in the fourth volume of the Proceedings of the Cambridge Philosophical Society of 1844). Philosophically, Ellis, like George Boole and later John Venn, defended an objective rather than subjective theory of probability.

William Walton edited a posthumous collection of both published and unpublished writings, in The mathematical and other writings of R. L. Ellis (1863): this was prefaced by a biographical memoir by Harvey Goodwin. Correspondence and notebooks of Ellis are amongst the Mayor Papers and Whewell Papers at Trinity College, Cambridge.

Leslie translated Dante, Roman law texts and Danish ballads; a gentle melancholia suffuses the lines of his own poetry which he left in manuscript.
