= William Ryder (mayor) =

English merchant and politician

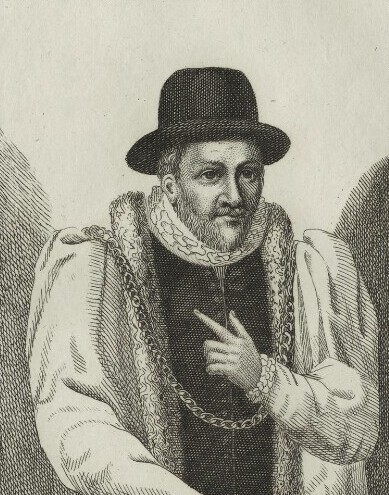
c. 1797 engraving of Ryder by William Richardson

Sir William Ryder (died 30 August 1611) was an English merchant and politician who served as the Lord Mayor of London in 1600. As mayor, he played a prominent role in quashing the abortive rebellion led by the Earl of Essex, by publicly proclaiming Essex a traitor, which immediately caused much of his support to melt away.

Ryder was a member of the Haberdasher's Company, one of the livery companies of London. He served as Sheriff of the City of London in 1592, Alderman in 1595, and Lord Mayor of London for 1600–1601. He married Elizabeth, the daughter of Richard Stone. He had a son Ferdinando, who predeceased him, and two daughters: Mary, wife of Sir Thomas Lake, Secretary of State, and Susan, third wife of Sir Thomas Caesar, MP and Baron of the Exchequer. He was knighted in 1601. Upon the death of his brother Edward Ryder in 1609, he acquired the manor of Leyton Grange in Essex; this manor had previously been owned by Sir Oliver Cromwell, uncle of the Lord Protector. He died in 1611, and the manor passed to his daughters at his death.

Civic offices
| Preceded by Nicholas Mosley; Robert Broke | Sheriffs of the City of London; 1592–1593; With: Benedict Barnham | Succeeded by John Garrard; Robert Taylor |
| Preceded by Nicholas Mosley | Lord Mayor of London; 1600–1601 | Succeeded by John Garrard |
