= Sauvey Castle =

Castle in the United Kingdom

- Withcote, Leicestershire
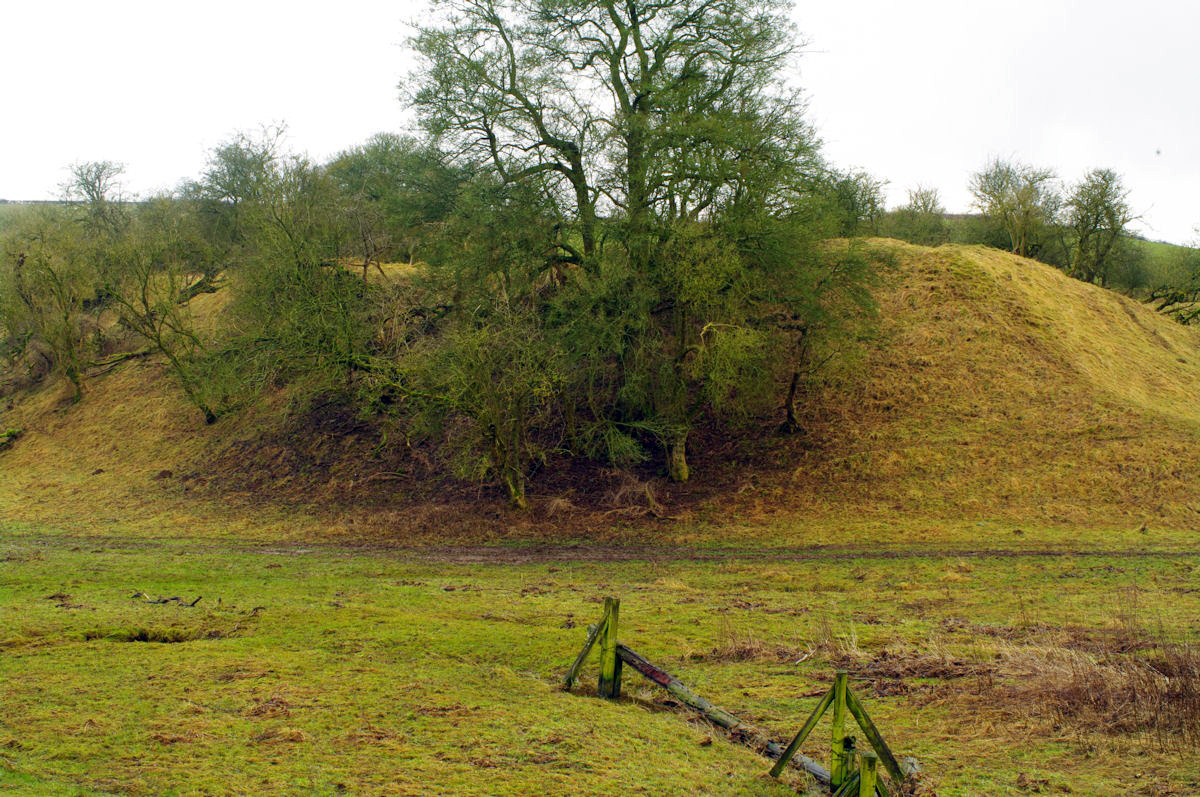
- Surviving earthworks

Site information
- Open to the public: No

Location
- Coordinates: 52.638977°N 0.837072°W

Sauvey Castle is a medieval castle, near Withcote, Leicestershire, England. It was probably built by King John in 1211 as a secluded hunting lodge in Leighfield Forest. It comprised a ringwork or shell keep, with an adjacent bailey; earthwork dams were constructed to flood the area around the castle, creating a large, shallow moat. The castle was occupied by the Count of Aumale in the early reign of Henry III, but it then remained in the control of the Crown and was used by royal foresters until it fell into disuse in the 14th century. By the end of the 17th century, its walls and buildings had been dismantled or destroyed, leaving only the earthworks, which remain in a good condition in the 21st century.

== Construction ==
Historians are divided as to when Sauvey Castle was constructed; most suggest that it was built by King John in 1211 when he acquired the surrounding lands, although some sources argue it was built during the reign of King Stephen, between 1135 and 1153. (Note: The historians Leonard Cantor, Nigel Pounds, Robert Higham, Philip Barker and the Heritage Gateway website prefer an early 13th-century date for the foundation of the castle; the Historic England agency and the Pastscape website, also managed by Historic England, prefer a date in the reign of King Stephen, between 1135 and 1153.) The castle was located in a secluded part of Leighfield Forest, part of the wider Forest of Rockingham, and, if built by John, was intended for use as a hunting lodge. Its name in Norman French was Salveé, meaning "dark island".

The castle lies on raised ground along a valley, with two tributaries of the River Chater running past it to the north and south. It comprises an oval enclosure 60 by 40 metres (200 by 130 ft) across, variously described as a shell keep or a ringwork, separated by a deep ditch from a rectangular bailey to the west, 100 by 70 metres (330 by 230 ft) in size. The bailey had a guardhouse at its north-east corner, overlooking the entrance. Buildings were constructed around the south side of the enclosure, with a chapel in the middle. The castle was built largely from stone, with a curtain wall around the enclosure.

A ditch was cut along the western site of the castle, between 20 metres (66 ft) and 60 metres (200 ft) wide, and an earth bank, or dam, 6 metres (20 ft) high was built to the south-east; these allowed the area around the castle to be flooded, forming a large, shallow lake or moat. A similar design of moat can be seen at Ravensworth Castle. Fishponds were constructed as part of the complex, linked to the moat.

== History ==
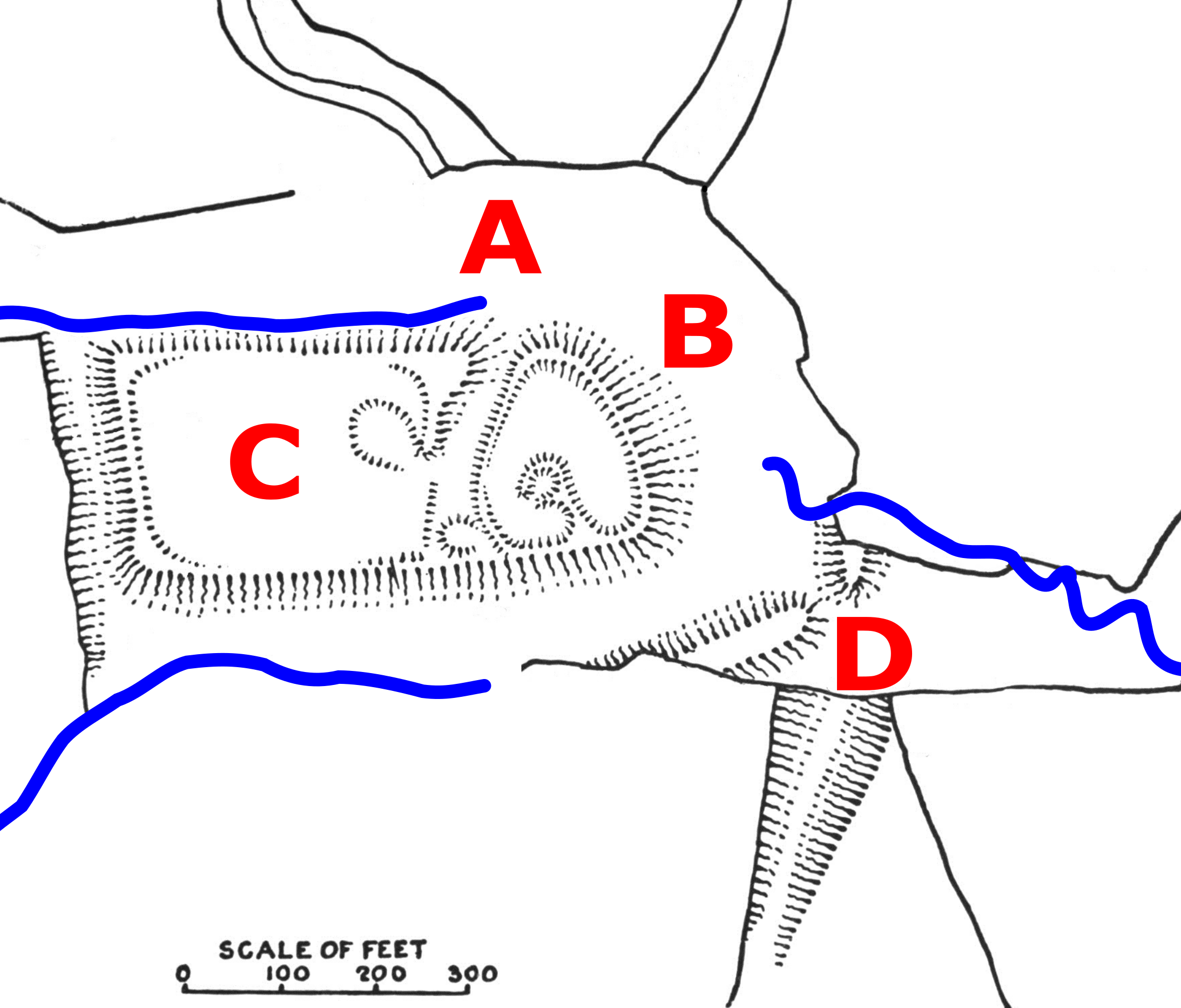
Plan of castle: A - moated area; B - bailey; C - ringwork or shell keep; D - dam

The first records of Sauvey Castle date around 1216, during the First Barons' War, when the government of the young Henry III ordered the royal castle to be surrendered to William de Fors, the Count of Aumale. The count established a power base in the region, but in 1218 William Marshal, the regent, ordered him to return it to the Crown; the count declined. Further demands followed until, in 1220, royal forces besieged and took the count's castle at nearby Rockingham. In a face-saving solution, the count finally returned Sauvey to the King, supposedly of his own free will, in exchange for the cancellation of any debts that he might have owed to the Crown.

The castle was occupied by royal foresters during the 13th century, usually the keepers of Leighfield, and the castle carried with it the rights to the neighbouring manor of Withcote. In the mid-13th century, the castle carried a small "farm" - an annual fee owed to the Crown by its holder - of £3. (Note: It is impossible to accurately compare medieval incomes or prices with modern equivalents. For comparison, the average baron in 1220 had an annual income of around £200.) In the 1240s Henry III ordered the sheriff of Leicester to build a timber chapel in Sauvey Castle, using wood from Rockingham Forest and reusing stones from a collapsed stable.

After 1246, the castle declined in importance, although during the instability and revolts of 1258, Henry III ordered Sauvey to be used as the shrieval, or sheriff's, castle for the counties of Leicestershire and Warwickshire, which lacked their own shrieval castles. In 1289, the keeper of Rockingham Forest removed stonework and lead from the property, for reuse at Rockingham Castle.

The castle was last referred to in active use in 1316, after which it was probably allowed to decay; further stonework was taken by the keeper of Rockingham Forest in 1373, by which time the castle had probably been abandoned. By the 15th century, Sauvey formed a subsidiary property of Withcote manor - a reversal of the old land holding pattern. Its structures had mostly been dismantled or destroyed by 1622 and had gone entirely by the end of the century.

The site is protected under UK law as a Scheduled Ancient Monument. It remains in a good condition and Historic England regard the castle's earthworks and moat design as distinctive, with "few parallels nationally".

== Bibliography ==
- Cantor, Leonard (1977–1978). "The Medieval Castles of Leicestershire". Transactions of the Leicestershire Archaeological and Historical Society. 53: 30–41.
- Carpenter, D. A. (1990). The Minority of Henry III. Berkeley, US and Los Angeles, US: University of California Press. ISBN 978-0-520-07239-8.
- Creighton, O. H. (1997). "Early Leicestershire Castles: Archaeology and Landscape History" (PDF). Transactions of the Leicestershire Archaeological and Historical Society. 71: 21–36.
- Creighton, O. H. (2002). Castles and Landscapes: Power, Community and Fortification in Medieval England. London, UK: Equinox. ISBN 978-1-904768-67-8.
- Higham, Robert; Barker, Philip (2004). Timber Castles. Exeter, UK: University of Exeter Press. ISBN 9780859897532.
- Pounds, Norman John Greville (1990). The Medieval Castle in England and Wales: A Social and Political History. Cambridge, UK: Cambridge University Press. ISBN 978-0-521-45828-3.
- Speight, Sarah (2004). "Religion in the Bailey: Charters, Chapels and the Clergy". Château Gaillard: Études de castellologie médiévale. 21: 271–280.
