= John Underhill (courtier) =

English courtier

Sir John Underhill (1574–1679) was an English courtier. He was the son of Thomas Underhill of Loxley and Nether Pillerton in Warwickshire, and grandson of Thomas Underhill, who entered Lincoln's Inn.

He was born at Ettington Manor in 1574. Later he served as a gentleman usher for Sir Francis Bacon in 1617 at York House, which was the residence of the Keeper of the Seals while King James I was on his Northern tour. John Underhill was the son of Thomas Underhill (1516–1571) and Ann Wood, and the grandson of Thomas Underhill (1485–1520) and Anne Wynter.

John Underhill would go on to marry Alice Barnham, Viscountess of St. Alban, the recent widow of Sir Francis Bacon, on April 10, 1626 at St. Martin’s-in-the-Fields, the same place Francis Bacon had been baptized sixty-five years previously. The two are reputed to have maintained a relationship for some time. This was a scarce eleven days after Sir Francis’ death. Underhill was later knighted for unknown services only two months later. The Viscountess separated from Underhill in 1639. She later died on 29 June 1650. Sir John Underhill was laid to rest on April 14, 1679, at St Giles in the Fields in London.

== Sources ==
- Bulletin of the Underhill Society of America Education and Publishing Fund, 1967
