= Withcote Chapel =

Coordinates: 52.6440°N 0.8254°W

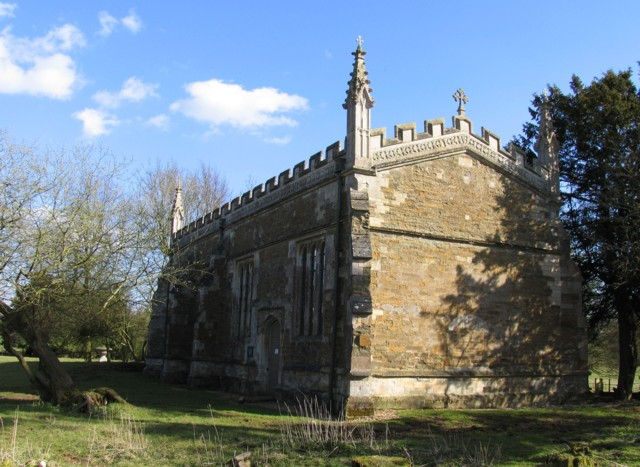
- Withcote Chapel from the northwest

- Location in Leicestershire
- Location: Withcote, Leicestershire
- Country: England
- Denomination: Anglican
- Website: Churches Conservation Trust

Architecture
- Functional status: Redundant
- Heritage designation: Grade I
- Designated: 29 December 1966
- Architectural type: Church
- Style: Gothic
- Groundbreaking: Early 16th century
- Completed: 1744

Specifications
- Materials: Ironstone with limestone dressings, and lead roofs

Withcote Chapel is a redundant Anglican church in the parish of Withcote, Leicestershire, England (grid reference SK795057). It is recorded in the National Heritage List for England as a designated Grade I listed building, and is under the care of the Churches Conservation Trust. Alec Clifton-Taylor includes the church in his list of 'best' English parish churches.

== History ==
The chapel was built in the early 16th century. It was originally the private chapel for Withcote Hall, but later became a parish church. It underwent external restoration and internal refurbishment in 1744, at which time the embattled parapet and the corner pinnacles were added.

== Architecture ==
Withcote Chapel is constructed in ironstone with limestone dressings, and has lead roofs. The plan is a simple rectangle of four bays, with no differentiation between the nave and the chancel. There are buttresses along the sides and at the corners. An embattled parapet runs along the sides and over the gabled ends. On each corner is a crocketted pinnacle. The windows are all square-headed and contain three round-headed lights. There are doorways on the north and south sides, and signs of a blocked west doorway.

Almost all the internal fittings date from the 18th century. The seating is arranged along the sides in the style of a college chapel. The reredos is in Renaissance style, and is in three parts. The centre is flanked by fluted Corinthian columns. The sides are canted with similar columns and with pediments. On top of each side-piece is a marble monument.

The stained glass dates from between 1530 and 1540 and has either been moved here from elsewhere, or was commissioned by Roger Ratcliffe, owner of Withcote Hall. It is attributed to Galyon Hone, a glazier who worked for Henry VIII. The windows in the north wall depict the apostles, and those on the south show Old Testament figures including prophets. In the east window, there are depictions of saints and the Crucifixion. Around the chapel are heraldic panels, one including the arms of Jane Seymour.

== See also ==
- List of churches preserved by the Churches Conservation Trust in the English Midlands
