= Benedict Barnham =

Member of the Parliament of England

Member of Parliament for Yarmouth
- In office 1597–1601 Serving with John Snow
- Preceded by: Robert Dillington
- Succeeded by: William Cotton

Master of the Drapers' Company
- In office 1592–1593
- In office 1596–1597

Sheriff of London
- In office 1591–1592 Serving with William Ryder
- Preceded by: Robert Broke
- Succeeded by: Robert Taylor

Alderman of Bread Street
- In office 14 October 1591 – 3 April 1598

Member of Parliament for Minehead
- In office 1588–1589 Serving with John Luttrell
- Preceded by: Robert Crosse
- Succeeded by: James Quirke

Benedict Barnham (baptised 1559 – 1598) was a London merchant, alderman and sheriff of London and MP. (Note: The following entry appears in Oxford Alumni, 1500–1886, 1500–1714, Volume I: Barnham, Benedict, of St. Alban Hall in or before 1572 (s. Francis, of London, merchant and alderman), M.P. Minehead 1588-9, and Yarmouth, Isle of Wight, 1597-8, alderman of Breadstreet Ward 1591, sheriff of London and Middlesex 1591, F.S.A. 1592, died 3 April 1598, aged 39. See Remembrancia of London, 80; Foster's Parliamentary Dictionary; & D.N.B.) (Note: According to Boyd's Inhabitants of London, Benedict Barnham, citizen, draper, alderman and sheriff, freed two apprentices: 1) Abraham Cartright, citizen & draper, 16 September 1590 and 2) Edmond Hill, citizen and draper, 15 July 1603. Since Benedict died in 1598, the second entry is suspect. Perhaps Edmond Hill completed the full term of his apprenticeship under Benedict's heirs.)

== Life ==
Barnham was born the fourth son of the merchant Francis Barnham (died 1575), a draper, alderman and sheriff of London in 1570, and Alice (1523–1604) daughter of William Bradbridge (d. 1546). He was baptised in 1559. Barnham along with his elder brother Martin (baptised 1548, died 1610) was educated at St Alban Hall, Oxford, but left apparently without a degree.

Barnham became a liveryman of the Drapers' Company. He was elected Member of Parliament for Minehead in 1589. On 14 October 1591 he was chosen alderman of Bread Street ward (a position he held for the rest of his life). In the same year he was third warden of the Drapers' Company, but surrendered this post on election as sheriff for the year 1591 and 1592 (At 32 he was considered young to be sheriff but thirteen men more senior than he had declined to serve owing to the financial demands of the office). He served two terms as Master of the Drapers' Company in 1592–1593 and 1596–1597. In 1597 he sat in Parliament for the second time, this time representing Yarmouth, Isle of Wight.

Barnham was a member of the Elizabethan College of Antiquaries. He died 3 April 1598, aged 39, and an elaborate monument was erected above his grave in St Clement Eastcheap.

Barnham was acquiring estates by 1575 (Note: For example in 1592 Robert, eldest son of the Earl of Sussex, had mortgaged the manor of Drayton in Hampshire to Alice and Benedict Barneham for the sum of £1,054, but three months later the enrolment was cancelled and the earl redeemed the manor for £1,024 (Page 1908, pp. 148–151). He conveyed it to Richard Garth later that same year, in whose family it remained for about forty years.) and by his death he held property in London, and land in Essex, Hampshire and Kent valued at £20,100. The chief beneficiaries were his wife and daughters, but Wood tells that he left £200 to St. Alban's Hall, Oxford, to rebuild "its front next the street", and that "as a testimony of the benefaction his arms were engraved over the gateway and on the plate belonging to the house".

== Family ==
Barnham married Dorothy (died 1639), daughter of Ambrose Smith of Cheapside (the silkman to Queen Elizabeth), at St Clement Eastcheap on 28 April 1583. They had eight children. Three girls and a boy died in infancy. The remaining four girls lived to marry: Elizabeth the eldest married Mervyn Tuchet, 2nd Earl of Castlehaven, Alice married Sir Francis Bacon in 1606, and Bridget married Sir William Soame of Thurlow, Suffolk.

Dorothy survived her husband, and became, a year or two after his death, the wife of Sir John Pakington.

== Notes ==
Civic offices
Preceded by Nicholas Mosley; Robert Broke	Sheriffs of the City of London; 1592–1593; With: William Ryder	Succeeded by John Garrard; Robert Taylor
