= St James Duke's Place =

Former church-site in London

Coordinates: 51°30′49″N 00°04′40″W

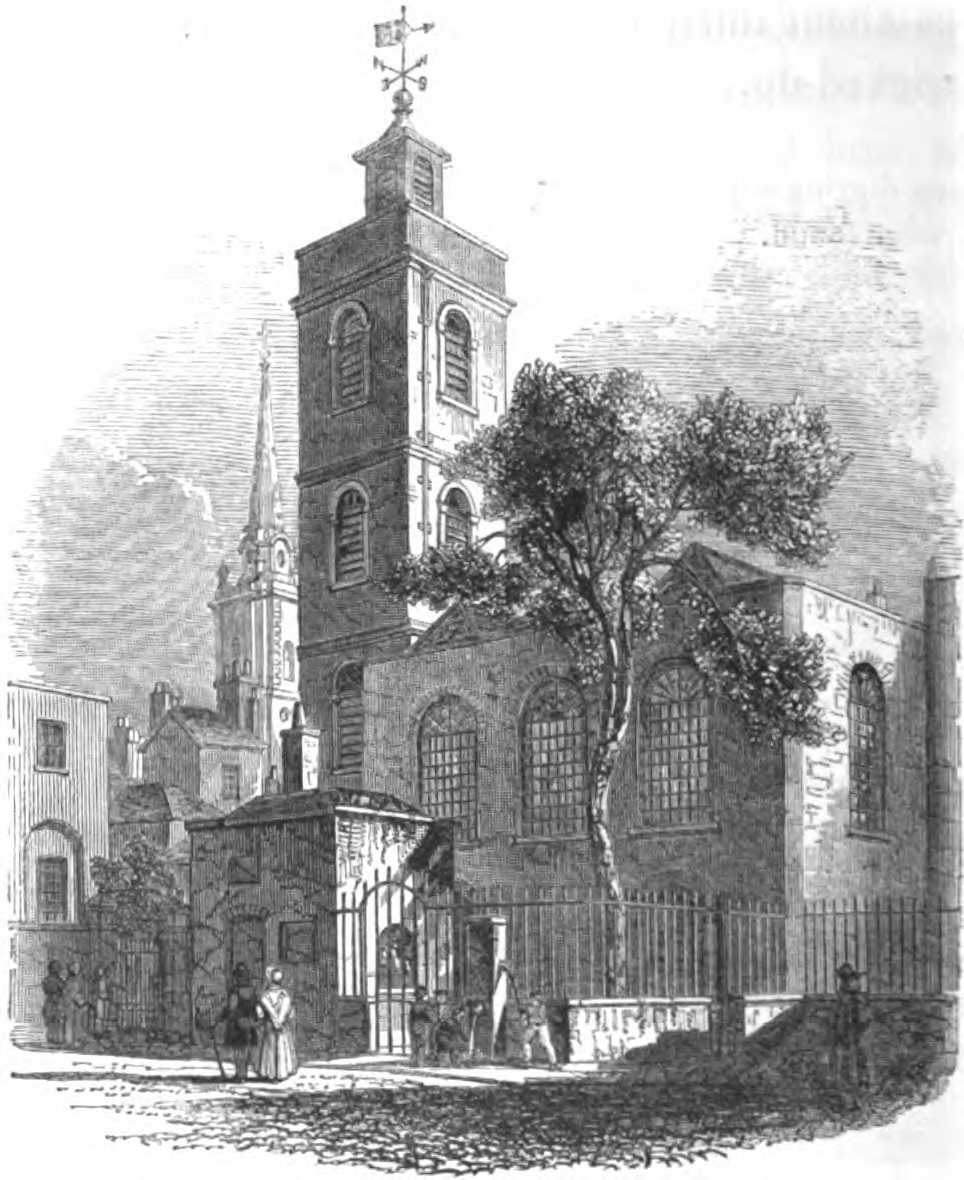
- St James Duke's Place
- Location: City of London
- Country: England
- Denomination: Church of England

Architecture
- Style: Georgian
- Years built: 1727
- Demolished: 1874

St James Duke's Place was an Anglican parish church in the Aldgate ward of the City of London. It was established in the early 17th century, rebuilt in 1727 and closed and demolished in 1874.

== History ==
The area which was to become Duke's Place was occupied until its dissolution in 1531 by the Priory of Holy Trinity, Christ Church. Henry VIII then gave the land to Sir Thomas Audley who cleared it and built houses on the site, although fragments of the medieval buildings still survived at the beginning of the nineteenth century. The area was eventually inherited by Audley's son-in-law, the Duke of Norfolk, from whom the name "Duke's Place" is derived.

In the early 17th century the residents of the former priory precinct, finding worship at St Katherine Cree "uncongenial" sought permission from the king, James I to build a parish church for themselves. Permission was granted, and the new church, dedicated to St James in tribute to the king, was consecrated on 2 January 1622. The patronage of the new church belonged to the lord mayor and commonalty of London, and the parish claimed exemption from the Bishop of London in ecclesiastical matters. It was notable in the late 17th century as a "marriage factory", with multiple ceremonies each day.

The church survived the Great Fire of London, but fell into disrepair and was rebuilt in 1727, retaining much of the original woodwork. George Godwin, writing in 1839, called it "a plain warehouse like construction of brick, quite unworthy of description". It was 65 feet long and 42 feet wide, and divided into nave and aisles by wooden columns supporting entablatures and a flat ceiling. The stained glass in the east window, included the arms of Sir Edward Barkham, the Lord Mayor who had been instrumental in the establishment of the church. There was a tower; Godwin suspected its trefoil openings were survivals from the priory building. An organ ("exceedingly small", according to Godwin ) was installed in 1815 and the church restored in 1823.

The poverty of the area and its increasing Jewish population made it increasingly difficult to raise funds to maintain the church; Godwin described it as being "in a very dirty and dilapidated state". In 1874, under the 1860 Union of Benefices Act, it was demolished and the parish joined to that of St Katherine Cree. The site of the church is now occupied by the Sir John Cass School.
