= Henry Smith (regicide) =

English MP and one of the regicides of King Charles I

Member of Parliament for Leicestershire
- In office 1640–1649

Personal details
- Born: 1620 Withcote, Leicestershire, England
- Died: 1668 (aged 47–48) Mont Orgueil Castle, Jersey
- Spouse: Miss Holland
- Education: Oxford University; Lincoln's Inn
- Occupation: Member of Parliament, regicide
- Known for: 19th of the 59 signatories on the death warrant of the King

Henry Smith (1620–1668) was an English member of parliament and one of the regicides of King Charles I.

== Family background ==
He was born in Withcote, Leicestershire in 1620; son of Henry Smith born in 1589 and Frideswide (Fritzjoyce) Wright. His grandfather, Roger Smith, hosted Mary, Queen of Scots, at Withcote on 24 September 1586 as she travelled to Fotheringhay Castle. Henry Smith studied at Oxford University and Lincoln's Inn. He married Miss Holland.

== Parliament and Charles I ==
In 1640 he was elected MP for Leicestershire. In January 1649, as a commissioner of the High Court of Justice for the trial of Charles I at the trial of King Charles, he was 19th of the 59 signatories on the death warrant of the King.

After the Restoration in 1660 he was brought to trial for regicide and was sentenced to death. He successfully appealed the sentence which was then commuted to life imprisonment. He was held at the Tower of London until 1664, and was then transported to Jersey where he is thought to have died in 1668 in Mont Orgueil castle.
