= Robert Needham, 2nd Viscount Kilmorey =

Robert Needham, 2nd Viscount Kilmorey (c. 1587/88 – 12 September 1653) was an English Royalist and supporter of Charles I during the English Civil War.

== Biography ==
Robert Needham was born about 1598, the son of Sir Robert Needham, 1st Viscount Kilmorey and Jane Lacy (daughter of John Lacy of Borston or Borseton). (Note: In the reign of King James I of England the Needham family were actively involved as "planters" in the Plantation of Ulster. For his support his father was granted the Feudal Barony of Orhera in County Armagh in 1613 and was created Viscount Kilmorey by Charles I in 1625.)

Needham was educated at Shrewsbury School. He was a Member of Parliament of the Addled Parliament for Newcastle-under-Lyme Staffordshire in 1614. In the same year he was granted the freedom of Shrewsbury. He was a Justice of the Peace in Lancashire by 1627 and held the post until at least 1630.

Needham succeeded his father in 1631, inheriting his titles as 2nd Viscount Kilmorey, and 2nd Feudal Baron of Orhera, and his English estate of Shavington Hall at Adderley, Shropshire. His name appears among those having a proxy in the Irish House of Lords on 30 July 1634.

Kilmorey supported the Royalist cause in the English Civil War. He served on Commission of Array for both Cheshire and Shropshire. With the outbreak of war he joined the Chester garrison which was commanded by his son-in-law John, Lord Byron. Although his younger son was captured in a skirmish in 1645, and that it was falsely rumoured that his wife Frances had been killed, Kilmorey escaped at the end of the siege (late January) and made his way to Oxford, which was still held by a large Royalist garrison, where he surrendered when the city surrendered (24 June 1646).

Needham was fined £3,560 for being a "Delinquent (Royalist)" which substantially below other comparatively wealthy Royalists and the Cheshire committee said as much, it perhaps reflected the damage to his estate as it was situated in a war zone. He was able to reduce this still further to £2,360 by promising to pay an annual £90 stipend to the minister who lived a rectory of Wrenbury, Cheshire. He is not recorded as taking part in the Second Civil War. During the Third Civil War he was arrested when Charles II led a predominantly Scottish army through Cheshire on the way to defeat at the Battle of Worcester (3 September 1651). He lived quietly and died two years later at Dutton, Cheshire on 12 September 1653. His estates passed to his son and heir Robert, the 3rd Viscount who six years later was to be a participant in Booth's Rebellion.

== Family ==
Robert Needham married Frances Anderson, daughter of Alderman Sir Henry Anderson of London and Elizabeth Bowyer and they had one son and two daughters including:

- Robert
- Frances

In about 1623 he married Eleanor, daughter of Thomas Dutton of Dutton. Eleanor was the widow of Gilbert, Lord Gerard of Gerrard's Bromley, Staffordshire. Robert and Eleanor had twelve children including a son Charles, and Eleanor (died 1663), second wife of John Byron, 1st Baron Byron, one of the great beauties of the English Court and according to the diarist Samuel Pepys the 17th mistress of Charles II.

== Notes ==
Peerage of Ireland
Preceded by Robert Needham	Viscount Kilmorey; 1631–1653	Succeeded by Robert Needham
