= Thomas Erskine, 1st Earl of Kellie =

Scottish peer

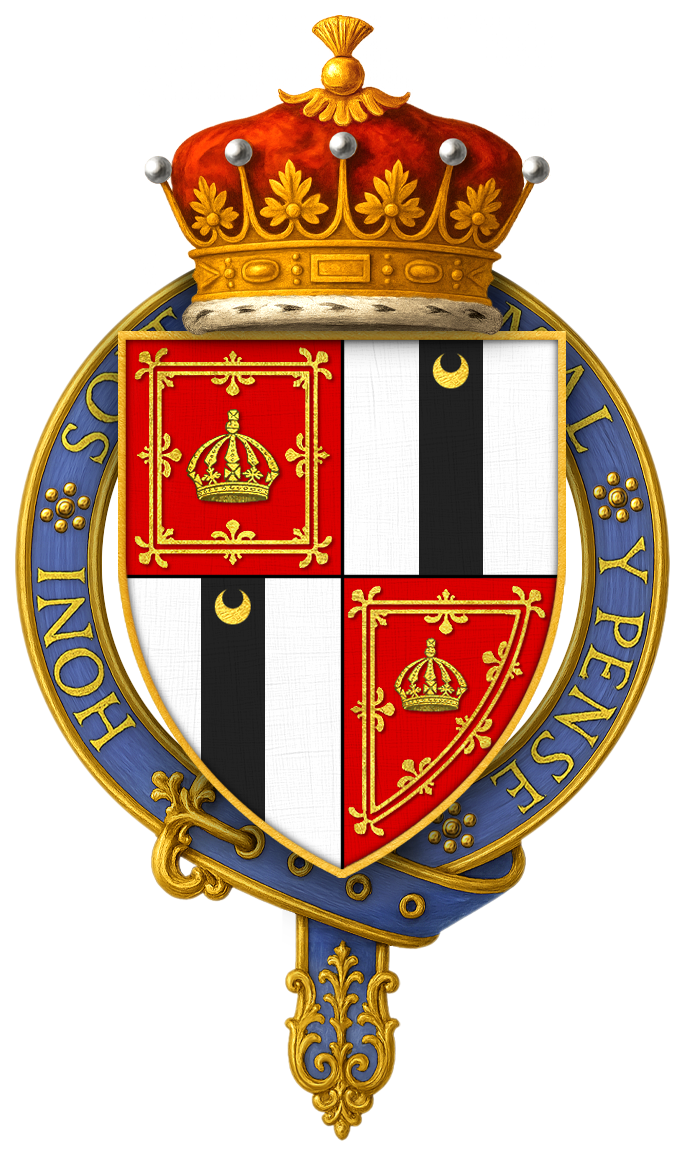
Arms of Sir Thomas Erskine, 1st Viscount of Fentoun, KG

Thomas Erskine, 1st Earl of Kellie (1566 – 12 June 1639) was a Scottish peer.

== Biography ==
Thomas Erskine was the eldest surviving son of Sir Alexander Erskine of Gogar and Margaret Home, a daughter of George Home, 4th Lord Home and Mariotta Haliburton.

Thomas was a school classmate and lifelong personal friend of James VI of Scotland (later James I of England). He was a server at the king's table, a "sewar". In 1585 he was made a Gentleman of His Majesty's Bedchamber.

James VI married Anne of Denmark by proxy in 1589 and while waiting for his bride to come to Scotland, wrote a series of poems in Scots now known as the Amatoria. Some manuscript copies include Erskine's name as "Sr Thomas Areskine of Gogar". It has been suggested that Erskine collaborated with the king in writing the poems, or was involving in circulating them.

In November 1592 Erskine was identified with the friends of Duke of Lennox, Sir George Home, Colonel William Stewart, the Laird of Dunipace, and James Sandilands, as a supporter of the king's former favourite James Stewart, Earl of Arran, working for his rehabilitation to the disadvantage of the Chancellor, John Maitland and the Hamilton family. The English diplomat Robert Bowes called this group the "four young and counselling courtiers."

In January 1593 James VI set a tax anticipating the expenses of the birth and baptism of Prince Henry and appointed Erskine Collector General of this tax. At the tournament during the baptism festivities, Erskine performed in a team with the King, dressed as Knights of Malta.

James VI gave his courtiers gifts of jewelry at New Year. In January 1596 Erskine received a "tablet" or locket set with rubies and diamonds and a gold ring set with a table diamond. Erskine had his own chamber in the royal lodgings at Holyrood Palace, and 800 door nails were bought to fix the panelling in September 1599, and the roof was fixed in October.

He was with the king on the occasion of the Gowrie Conspiracy in 1600, when James rode from Falkland Palace to the house of the Ruthven brothers in Perth, where he was supposedly to be kidnapped or assassinated. Erskine was awarded a third of the land confiscated from the Ruthvens and given the title Lord Erskine of Dirletoun in 1604. He was made a Privy Councilor in 1601 and accompanied the Duke of Lennox on a diplomatic visit to France.

James VI maintained a "secret correspondence" with some of Queen Elizabeth's courtiers, hoping thereby to facilitate his succession to the throne of England. A letter to Sir Robert Cecil was sealed with Erskine's heraldry, and his initials as "T. A" for Thomas Areskine.

== At court in England ==
Thomas Erskine travelled with James to England when James ascended the English throne in 1603. Lady Anne Clifford described a visit to the king at Theobalds in May 1603, noting that the fashion of the court had changed, "we were all lowzy by sittinge in Sir Thomas Erskin's chamber." The French ambassador the Marquis de Rosny identified Erskine as an influential courtier, and gave him a hatbadge or enseigne in the form of a gold heart set with diamonds.

According to the Marquis de Rosny, Erskine was a member of a conspicuous bedchamber faction at court which included the Earl of Mar and Edward Bruce. The Duke of Lennox and his followers formed a separate Scottish group and envied the influence of the bedchamber Scots.

Erskine was made Captain of the Guard (1603–1617), Groom of the Stool in 1604, and created Viscount Fenton (or Fentoun) in 1606. On 10 August 1604, when King James was away from London at the hunt, he sent Erskine from Bletsoe to greet the Spanish ambassador, Juan Fernández de Velasco y Tovar, 5th Duke of Frías, Constable of Castile, and apologise for his absence.

Erskine wrote frequently to the Earl of Mar in Scotland with political and court news. He described Anne of Denmark's nosebleed at Oatlands in September 1604, which lasted a day, the "first 12 hours in such abundance as you would not believe". In June 1612 he described efforts to reduce the costs of the royal households:

There is much pain taken to draw his Majesty's estate in a right form; the expense is so great and so much more than the receipt, that his Majesty will be forced to retrench both in his own house, the Queen's, and the Prince his house, and this they go about presently. How it shall please women and young folks as yet I can say any thing.

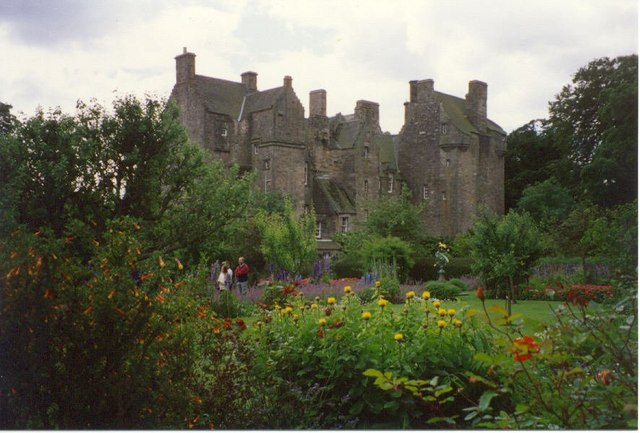
Kellie Castle, Fife, Scotland, National Trust for Scotland

He was at Whitehall Palace on 27 December 1612 when contracts were exchanged for the marriage Princess Elizabeth and Frederick V of the Palatinate, and wrote to Mar that "The marriage is appointed to be on Saint Valentine's day and by mere accident".

Erskine acquired Kellie Castle from the 5th Lord Oliphant in 1613 and was given the barony of Kellie. On 23 April 1615 he was made a Knight of the Garter. He had lodgings at Theobalds House near London. When the Dutch ambassador Noel Caron came to Theobalds on 16 March 1616, he waited first in Lord Fenton's lodging before seeing King James in the Privy Gallery.

Fenton had a dispute with his brother, Sir George Erskine of Innerteil. In June 1616, George Erskine sent a letter written in Italian to Anne of Denmark, trying to prevent Fenton obtaining a "tack" of lands at Carnbee, beside Kellie Castle. She and the translator revealed the contents to Fenton. Fenton was made Earl of Kellie in March 1619.

When King James died in March 1625 the Privy Council drafted a proclamation. Kellie reminded them that James had preferred the title "King of Great Britain", and he assured the council that using "King of England and Scotland" would not please the people of Scotland. Charles I made a gift of the silver plate used by his late father in his bedchamber to the Earl of Kellie on 5 April 1625. Kellie was present at the private burial of King James at midnight on 5 May 1625 with Francis Stuart and Robert Gordon of Gordonstoun.

The Earl of Kellie died intestate in London in 1639 and was buried at Pittenweem, Fife.

Thomas's son Alexander predeceased his father in 1633. He was succeeded by his grandson, Thomas Erskine, 2nd Earl of Kellie.

== Family ==
The Earl of Kellie married three or four times. His first marriage, on 30 November 1587 was to Ann Ogilvie, daughter of Sir Gilbert Ogilvie of Powrie and sister of the political intriguer John Ogilvy of Powrie. A younger brother, James Erskine, married Marie, a daughter of Adam Erskine, Commendator of Cambuskenneth on 17 May 1594.

He is sometimes said to have married secondly in 1604 Elizabeth Pierrepoint, daughter of Sir Henry Pierrepoint,

Several sources note his second wife was Elizabeth Norreys, widow of Edward Norreys, following a letter of the Earl of Worcester. William Fowler, the secretary of Anne of Denmark, composed anagrams of her name.

He married thirdly, or fourthly, the thrice-widowed Dorothy, daughter of Ambrose Smith of Cheapside.

== Notes ==
Peerage of Scotland
New creation	Earl of Kellie; 1619–1639	Succeeded by Thomas Erskine
