= Peter Probie =

English politician

Arms of Proby: Ermine, on a fess gules a lion passant or

Sir Peter Probie (died March 1625) was an English politician who sat in the House of Commons at times between 1593 and 1598. He was Lord Mayor of London in 1622.

He was the second son of Ralph Probie and Alice Bernard of Brampton, Cambridgeshire. He was born in Chester, but when he was a boy the family moved to Brampton, where his mother's family were influential local landowners. (They were still very prominent in the 1660s, when Samuel Pepys in his famous Diary describes his friendship with the Bernards of the day.) Peter's elder brother Ralph died childless in 1605 and Peter inherited the family estates.

Probie was a member of the Worshipful Company of Barber-Surgeons and had been Secretary Walsingham's barber. He owed his rise to the patronage of Sir Thomas Heneage, Chancellor of the Duchy of Lancaster, and named his eldest son Heneage.

In 1593, Probie was elected Member of Parliament (MP) for Kingston upon Hull and for Liverpool in 1597.

On 10 May 1614, Probie was elected an alderman of the City of London for Queenhithe ward. He was Sheriff of London from 1614 to 1615. In 1615 he was Master of the Barber-Surgeons Company. He was Governor of the Irish Society from 1616 to 1622. He translated to the Worshipful Company of Grocers on 4 July 1622 and was later elected Lord Mayor of London. He was knighted on 8 June 1623. Also in 1623, he became alderman of Broad Street.

He married Elizabeth Thoroughgood, daughter of John Thoroughgood of Chivers, Essex, and widow of Edward Henson of London. As well as Heneage they had four younger sons and a daughter. It was a happy marriage and he left her generously provided for. She died in 1644.

Civic offices
Preceded by Sir Edward Barkham	Lord Mayor of the City of London; 1622	Succeeded by Martin Lumley
