= Withcote =

Coordinates: 52.644125°N 0.82647°W

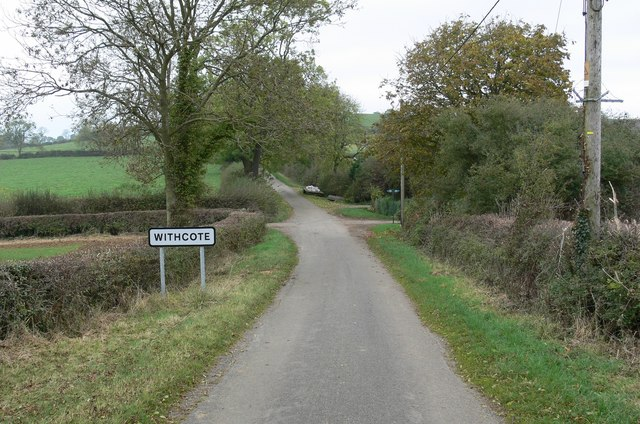

- Location within Leicestershire
- Civil parish: Withcote
- District: Harborough
- Shire county: Leicestershire
- Region: East Midlands
- Country: England
- Sovereign state: United Kingdom
- Post town: Oakham
- Postcode district: LE15
- Police: Leicestershire
- Fire: Leicestershire
- Ambulance: East Midlands
- UK Parliament: Harborough

Withcote is a small parish currently comprising a number of scattered dwellings in Harborough, a local government district of Leicestershire. The population is included in the civil parish of Braunston-in-Rutland.

== Buildings ==
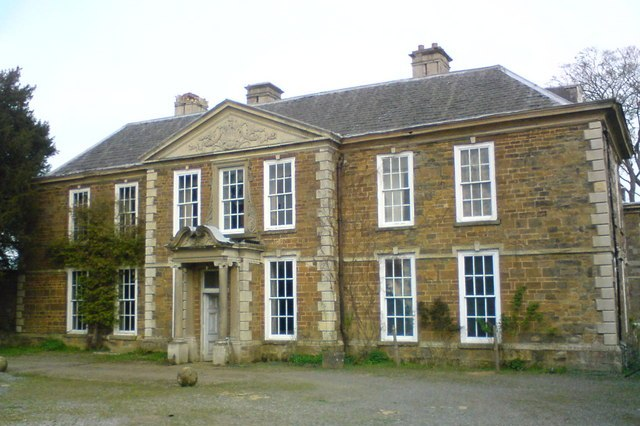
Withcote Hall

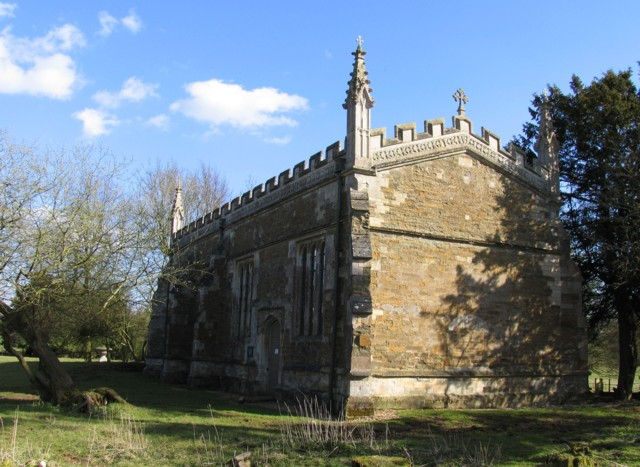
Withcote chapel

Withcote Hall is a Grade II* listed building that is on Historic England's Heritage at Risk Register as being unoccupied and in a very bad state It is an early C18 country house, incorporating an earlier building. In the sixteenth century the house built by Roger Ratcliffe was described by John Leland as "one of the fairest houses in Leicestershire".

The Tudor Withcote Chapel adjoins the Hall and is protected by the Churches Conservation Trust. It contains some stained glass attributed to Galyon Hone; a glazier to Henry VIII. Mary, Queen of Scots, stayed at Withcote on 24 September 1586 on her way to Fotheringhay Castle.

Sauvey Castle, an early medieval ringwork and bailey castle and is a Scheduled Ancient Monument, is also in this parish.

Close by is Launde Abbey which contains the Tudor monument to Gregory Cromwell, son of Thomas, who dissolved the monastery and built himself a mansion there.

== Notable residents ==
- Henry Smith (1620–1668) was born here, an English Member of Parliament and one of the regicides of King Charles I.
- Henry Poole (died 1559), High Sheriff of Leicestershire: originally from Derbyshire, he acquired Withcote Hall by marriage into the Smith family and made it his principal residence.
