= James Spedding =

English author and editor

James Spedding (28 June 1808 – 9 March 1881) was an English writer, chiefly known as the editor of the works of Francis Bacon.

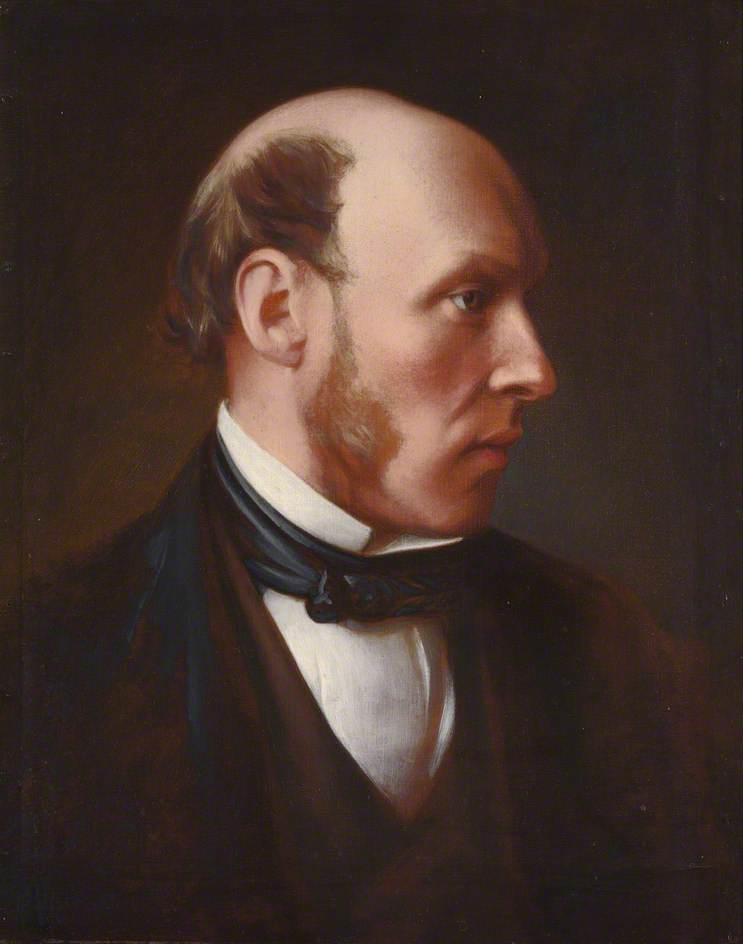
James Spedding

== Life ==
He was born in Cumberland, the younger son of a country squire, and was educated at Bury St Edmunds and Trinity College, Cambridge; where he took a second class degree in the classical tripos, was a Cambridge Apostle, and was junior optime in mathematics in 1831. In 1835 he entered the Colonial Office, but he resigned this post in 1841. In 1842 he was secretary to Lord Ashburton on his American mission, and in 1855 he became secretary to the Civil Service Commission; but from 1841 onwards he was constantly occupied in his researches into Bacon's life and philosophy. On 1 March 1881 he was knocked down by a cab in London, and on the 9th he died of erysipelas.

Spedding's major edition of Bacon's works was begun in 1847 in collaboration with Robert Leslie Ellis and Douglas Denon Heath. In 1853 Ellis had to leave the work to Spedding, with the occasional assistance of Heath, who edited most of the legal writings. The Works were published in 1857–1859 in seven volumes, followed by the Life and Letters (1861–1874). Taken together these works contain practically all the material which exists in connection with the subject, collected and weighed with care and impartiality.

In 1853, Delia Bacon approached Spedding with her belief that Francis Bacon was instrumental in the authorship of Shakespeare's works (see Shakespearean authorship). Spedding's initial reaction was "speechless astonishment"; but on later occasions he clearly expressed his disfavour of the Baconian hypothesis, and explained some of the common-sense reasons against it. Spedding was the first person to recognise the hand of John Fletcher in Shakespeare's Henry VIII—his "Who Wrote Henry VIII?" appeared in 1850; he was also one of the first people to perceive Shakespeare's hand in the additions to Sir Thomas More.

Spedding humorously emphasised his devotion to Bacon in the title of one of his non-Baconian works, Reviews and Discussions, Literary, Political and Historical, not relating to Bacon (1879).

== Selected publications ==
=== Works of Francis Bacon ===
- Volume 1 (1860)
- Volume 2
- Volume 3
- Volume 4
- Volume 5
- Volume 6
- Volume 7
- Volume 8
- Volume 9
- Volume 10
- Volume 11
- Volume 12
- Volume 13
- Volume 14
- Volume 15
