= Douglas Heath =

British lawyer and judge (1811–1897)

Douglas Denon Heath (1811–1897) was an English barrister and judge, known also as a literary editor, classical scholar and writer on physics.

== Life ==
The second son of George Heath, serjeant-at-law and son of James Heath the engraver, and his wife, Anne Raymond Dunbar, he was born in Chancery Lane, London, on 6 January 1811, younger brother of John Moore Heath, and the older brother of Dunbar Isidore Heath, and Leopold Heath. After school at Greenwich, he spent most of 1826-7 with friends of his father's in France, including his godfather Vivant Denon. He went into residence at Trinity College, Cambridge, in October 1828, and read for a year with Henry Malden. Among his Cambridge friends was James Spedding, with whom he visited William Wordsworth and Alfred Tennyson. Heath obtained a scholarship at Trinity on 23 April 1830, and two years later graduated senior wrangler, and took the first Smith's prize. In the classical tripos of the same year (1832) he was placed ninth in the first class, in a strong year. He was elected to a Trinity fellowship on 2 October 1832.

Heath entered the Inner Temple, and was called to the bar in 1835. In 1838 his father gained him the reversion of his own post as county clerk of Middlesex. In 1846 the courts of the county clerk were abolished; Heath declined to retire on full salary and took on the work of a county court judge in the Bloomsbury district.

On his father's death in 1852, Heath became the owner of Kitlands, a small estate near Leith Hill, Surrey. He resided there, and Tennyson, Spedding, and William Hepworth Thompson visited. Marianne North painted at Kitlands for the collection at Kew Gardens.

Heath was one of the founders and benefactors of the Surrey county school at Cranleigh. He died unmarried at Kitlands on 25 September 1897, and was buried in Coldharbour churchyard. One of the early Cambridge Apostles, he was the last survivor of that early group.

== Works ==
For Spedding, Heath edited the legal remains of Bacon for the seventh volume of the major edition of the Works of Francis Bacon (1859, ed. Spedding, Ellis, and Heath). The several manuscripts of Bacon's professional writings were carefully collated, and many passages for the first time made intelligible.

After retiring from the law, Heath wrote papers on Secular Local Changes in the Sea Level and the Dynamical Theory of Deep Sea Tides and the Effects of Tidal Friction (Philosophical Magazine March 1866 and March 1867). In 1874 he published An Elementary Exposition of the Doctrine of Energy, on the conservation of energy.

Heath defended Aristotle against what he saw as misconceptions by George Grote and others. He wrote on the Arabicus Mons, and on the Cratylus of Plato. He also published papers on the veracity of Herodotus, and his views were strengthened by a journey up the River Nile as far as Dongola in 1874-5.

== Notes ==
Attribution

This article incorporates text from a publication now in the public domain: Lee, Sidney, ed. (1901). "Heath, Douglas Denon". Dictionary of National Biography (1st supplement). Vol. 2. London: Smith, Elder & Co.
