= Robert Needham, 1st Viscount Kilmorey =

English politician and peer in the Peerage of Ireland

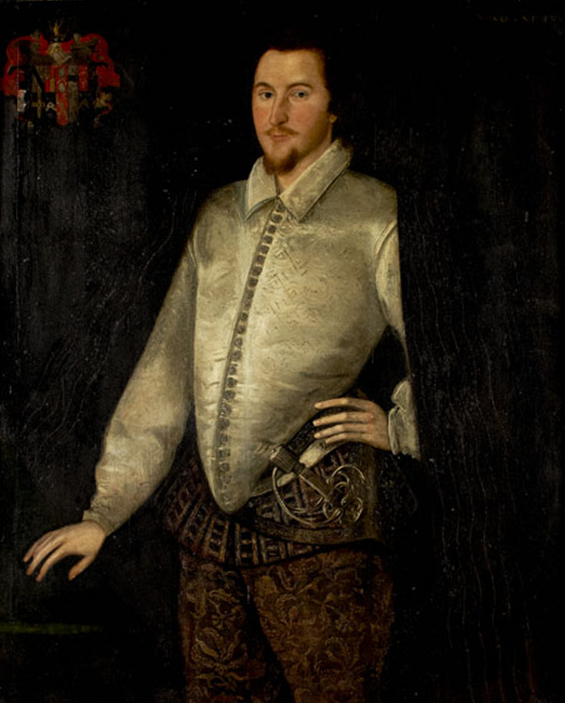
Sir Robert Needham in 1598

Robert Needham, 1st Viscount Kilmorey (c. 1565 – 1631) was an English politician and a peer in the peerage of Ireland.

== Biography ==
He was the eldest son of Robert Needham of Shavington Hall, near Adderley, in Shropshire, educated at Shrewsbury School (1577) and St John's College, Cambridge (1582) and trained in the law at the Inner Temple in 1583. He served in Ireland and was knighted by the Lord Deputy of Ireland in 1594. He succeeded his father in 1603, inheriting Shavington Hall at Adderley, Shropshire.

He was appointed a Justice of the Peace for Shropshire by 1596, a deputy lieutenant of the county in 1600 and High Sheriff of Shropshire for 1606–07. He was a member of the Council in the Marches of Wales in 1609 and vice-president of the council in 1614. He was a Member (MP) of the Parliament of England for Shropshire in 1593 and 1604. He was created Viscount Kilmorey in 1625.

He died in 1631 and was buried at Adderley. He was succeeded by his elder son, Robert.

== Family ==
Viscount Kilmorey was married four times:

- He married, firstly, Jane Lacy, daughter of John Lacy, circa 10 August 1586. They had a son Robert.
- He married, secondly, Anne Doyley before 14 October 1594.
- He married, thirdly, Catherine Robinson, daughter of John Robinson.
- He married fourthly 1629/31 the twice widowed Dorothy, daughter of Ambrose Smith of Cheapside.

== Estate ==
In 1613, Needham received a grant of the Barony of Orhera (also known as Orier Bar) and other lands in County Armagh from King James I, recognizing his service and loyalty. This grant established him as the 1st Feudal Baron of Orhera, County Armagh. He was created Viscount Kilmorey in the Peerage of Ireland by King Charles I on 18 April 1625.

== Family ==
Needham was married four times. His first marriage was to Jane Lacy, daughter of John Lacy, around 10 August 1586, with whom he had a son, Robert. He subsequently married Anne Doyley before 14 October 1594, then Catherine Robinson, daughter of John Robinson, and finally, between 1629 and 1631, he married Dorothy, daughter of Ambrose Smith of Cheapside, who had been widowed twice before.

Needham's will, dated 22 December 1630 and probated on 2 March 1631/1632, mentions his wife Dorothy, his son Robert, his sisters Dorothy Chetwood, Mary Vernon, Jane Hocknell, and Maude Aston, as well as his grandchildren Robert Needham, Charles Needham, George Needham, Eleanor Needham, Mary Needham, Susanna Needham, and Frances Cotton. His sons-in-law, Sir Rowland Cotton and Sir William Owen, are also referenced.

== Sources ==
- Bendall, Sarah (May 2010) [2004]. "Barnham, Benedict". Oxford Dictionary of National Biography (online ed.). Oxford University Press. doi:10.1093/ref:odnb/1488. (Subscription, Wikipedia Library access or UK public library membership required.)
- J.J.C. (1981). "Needham, Robert (c.1565-1631), of Shavington, Salop.". In Hasler, P.W. (ed.). The History of Parliament: the House of Commons 1558-1603. Boydell and Brewer.
- Mosley, Charles, ed. (2003), Burke's Peerage, Baronetage & Knightage, vol. 2 (107th in 3 volumes ed.), Wilmington, Delaware, U.S.: Burke's Peerage (Genealogical Books) Ltd, p. 2159
- Cokayne, G.E., ed. (2000), The Complete Peerage of England, Scotland, Ireland, Great Britain and the United Kingdom, Extant, Extinct or Dormant, vol. VII (reprint in 6 volumes ed.), Gloucester, U.K.: Alan Sutton Publishing, p. 261

Parliament of England
Preceded by Walter Leveson; Richard Leveson	Member of Parliament for Shropshire; 1593–1597; With: Francis Newport	Succeeded by Sir Henry Bromley; Thomas Leighton
Preceded by John Egerton; Roger Owen	Member of Parliament for Shropshire; 1604–1614; With: Sir Richard Leveson 1604–1605; Sir Roger Owen 1606–1614	Succeeded by Sir Roger Owen; Sir Richard Newport
Peerage of Ireland
New creation	Viscount Kilmorey; 1625–1631	Succeeded by Robert Needham

|}
