= Clan Mar =

Lowland Scottish clan

- Marr
- Crest: On a chapeau Gules furred Ermine, two wings, each of ten pen feathers, erected and addorsed, both blazoned as in the Arms.
- Motto: Pans Plus (Think More)

Profile
- Region: Lowlands
- District: Aberdeenshire

Chief
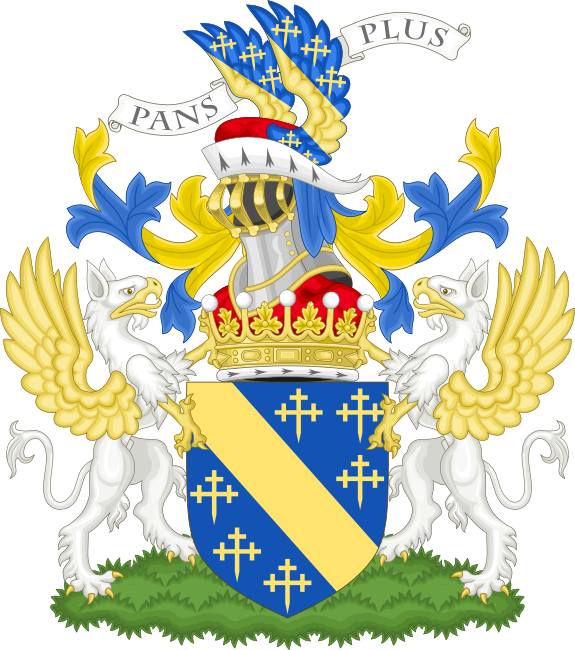
- Margaret of Mar
- The 31st Countess of Mar
- Seat: Great Witley, Worcestershire
- Historic seat: Kildrummy Castle
Septs of Clan Mar
Marr, Marrs, Mair, Mairs, Mayers, Morren, Strachan, Tough, Mahr.
Allied clans
Clan Bruce

Clan Mar is a Scottish clan of the Scottish Lowlands. It is also officially known as the Tribe of Mar. The chiefs of the Clan Mar were the original Earls of Mar, although this title later went via an heiress to the Douglases in the late 14th century, and then to the Stewarts before going to the Erskines. The current chief of Clan Mar is Margaret of Mar, Countess.

== History ==
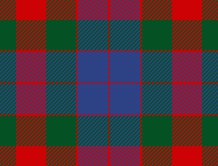
Mar tartan

=== Origins of the Clan ===
One of the seven ancient provinces or kingdoms of Scotland that was ruled by a mormaer, which was an ancient Pictish equivalent of an earl, was the Mormaerdom of Mar. The territory of the Earldom of Mar was in Aberdeenshire, between the River Dee and the River Don.

Donald, Mormaer of Mar fought alongside the High King of Ireland, Brian Boru, against the Viking invaders at the Battle of Clontarf in 1014. In a charter of 1114, erecting Scone Abbey, Rothri, Mormaer of Mar is named and is given the Latin title Comes which equates to the modern rank of Earl.

Sometime before 1152 Morggán (or Morgund) witnessed a charter to Dunfermline Abbey. Uilleam (William) was one of the Regents of Scotland and in 1264 he was the Great Chamberlain of the Realm. William's son was Domhnall (Donald) I who was knighted at Scone in September 1270 by Alexander III of Scotland. Donald witnessed the contract of marriage between Eric II of Norway and Margaret of Scotland. Donald also acknowledged Eric's daughter, Margaret, Maid of Norway as the lawful heir to the throne. However, Margaret died in Orkney en route to claim her kingdom.

=== Wars of Scottish Independence ===
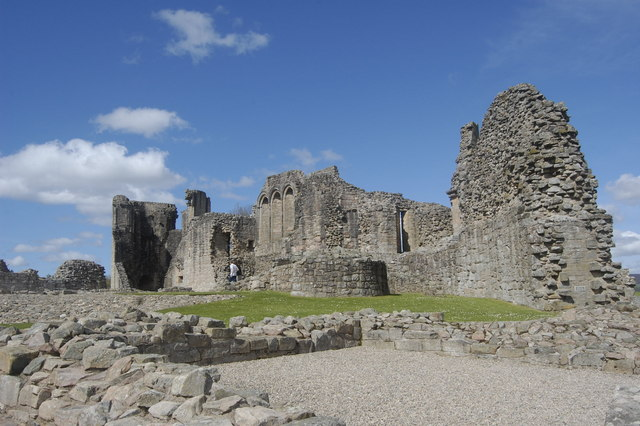
The ruins of Kildrummy Castle which was the seat of early chiefs of Clan Mar. It is believed to have been built during the lordships of Uilleam (William) and Domhnall (Donald) I.

The Earls of Mar supported Robert the Bruce's claim to the throne. Donald's eldest daughter was Isabella of Mar who was the first wife of Robert the Bruce. Isabella's brother was Gartnait (Gratney) who married Bruce's sister, Christina Bruce. Gratney was succeeded by his son, Domhnall (Donald) II. This Donald was captured at the Battle of Methven in 1306. He was then taken as a hostage to England and was not released until after the Scottish victory at the Battle of Bannockburn in 1314, when several other hostages including the wife, sister and daughter of Robert the Bruce were exchanged for the Earl of Hereford. Mar was chosen as Regent of Scotland in 1332 but he only held the title for ten days. On the eve of his election to the post, Edward Balliol marched with his English troops to Perth while Mar gathered his troops to confront the invaders. In the dead of night the English fell upon the Scots army while they were asleep and totally routed them. The Earl of Mar was among those who were killed.

Donald's son, the next earl, Thomas, died without issue and the title passed to Margaret, Countess of Mar who was his sister. From Margaret the title passed to her daughter, Isabel Douglas, Countess of Mar. Isabella's second husband was Alexander Stewart, Earl of Mar, son of Alexander Stewart, Earl of Buchan, the feared Wolf of Badenoch.

=== 15th to 16th centuries ===
Isabel Douglas, Countess of Mar died without issue and the claim to the Earldom of Mar passed to Robert Erskine, 1st Lord Erskine who was descended from Elyne, daughter of Gartnait (Gratney). Robert Erskine was recognized retrospectively as an Earl of Mar by the Earldom of Mar Restitution Act 1885 (48 & 49 Vict. c. 48).

=== 17th century and Civil War ===
In 1615 Chief John Erskine was appointed governor of Edinburgh Castle. He supported Charles I of England. Lord Erskine fought for the royalists at the Battle of Kilsyth in 1645. The family estates were forfeited for their support of the royalists but were later restored by Charles II of England in 1660.

=== 18th century and Jacobite risings ===
Chief John Erskine (known as "Bobbing John") supported the House of Stuart and the Jacobite cause during the uprisings. He had his honours forfeited for supporting the Jacobite cause. These honours were restored by the Mar Peerage Restoration Act 1824 (5 Geo. 4. c. 59).

== Clan Chief ==
The current chief of Clan Mar is Margaret, Countess of Mar who descends from the Earls of Mar, first creation (1404) (as deemed by Act of Parliament in 1885). She is chief of the name and arms of Mar.

The Clan Erskine has a separate chief; James Erskine, Earl of Mar and Kellie, who descends from the Earls of Mar, seventh Creation (1565) (as deemed by the House of Lords in 1875). He is chief of the name and arms of Erskine.

== Clan Castle ==
- Kildrummy Castle in Kildrummy, Aberdeenshire was the main strong-hold of the earldom of Mar. It is believed to have been built during the lordships of Uilleam (William) and Domhnall (Donald) I.

== See also ==
- Earl of Mar
- Scottish clan
