= Isabella of Mar =

- Countess of Carrick
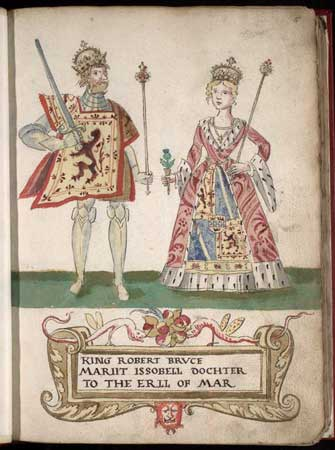
- Isabella and her husband, Robert the Bruce, as depicted in the 1562 Forman Armorial. The armorial depicts her husband as King of Scotland.
- Born: c. 1277
- Died: 12 December 1296 (aged 18–19)
- Spouse: Robert the Bruce, Earl of Carrick (m. 1296)
- Issue: Marjorie Bruce
- House: Clan Mar
- Father: Domhnall I, Earl of Mar
- Mother: Helen, widow of Máel Coluim II, Earl of Fife

Isabella of Mar (fl. c. 1277 – 12 December 1296) was the first wife of Robert Bruce VII, Earl of Carrick. Isabella died before her husband was crowned (as Robert I) King of Scotland. She and her husband were the grandparents of Robert II, King of Scotland, founder of the Royal House of Stuart.

Isabella was the daughter of Domhnall I, Earl of Mar (died 1297 - 1302) and Helen, widow of Máel Coluim II, Earl of Fife. It has been suggested that Isabella's mother was a daughter of Llywelyn ab Iorwerth. This is because Máel Coluim II had indeed "married a daughter of Llywelyn," but she was unnamed; Helen, mother of Isabella of Mar, became conflated with this unnamed daughter of Llywelyn ab Iorwerth because of the fact both were married to Máel Coluim II, Earl of Fife at some point. Genealogical insights indicate that the daughter of Llwyelyn the Earl of Fife married was actually Susanna, and that his widow Helen, who married Domhnall I after 1266, was an entirely different person.

Isabella's father was evidently an adherent of Robert Bruce V, Lord of Annandale (died 1295), a man who staked a claim to the Scottish throne. The close relationship between Domhnall's family and the Bruces is evidenced by two marriages; the first between Isabella and Robert, and the second between Domhnall's son and comital successor, Gartnait (died c.1302), and a sister of Robert Bruce VII.

The marriage of Robert Bruce VII and Isabella probably took place in the 1290s. The union produced a single child, a daughter named Marjorie (died 1316), who was born in about 1296. Robert and Isabella's daughter, Marjorie, married Walter Stewart, Steward of Scotland, and their son eventually reigned as Robert II, King of Scotland (died 1390).

Six years after Isabella's death in childbirth, Robert Bruce VII married his second wife, Elizabeth de Burgh (died 1327).

== The "Great Cause" ==
As the daughter of an Earl, Isabella's life was deeply entwined with the politics of her kingdom. In 1286, a few years after her birth, King Alexander III was found dead on the shores near Kinghorn. His heir, Margaret of Norway, was too young to take the throne at this time, but four years later in 1290, she was brought to Orkney, where she died at 7 years old. What followed was Scotland's most notorious succession dispute, one that eventually led to Bruce's ascension and the Scottish Wars of Independence. After Margaret's death, the Scottish nobles formed factions in support of the two primary families vying for the throne, the House of Balliol and the House of Bruce. The fate of Isabella, her kingdom, and the future Stewart dynasty all hinged on these two houses.

=== Clan Mar and the House of Bruce ===
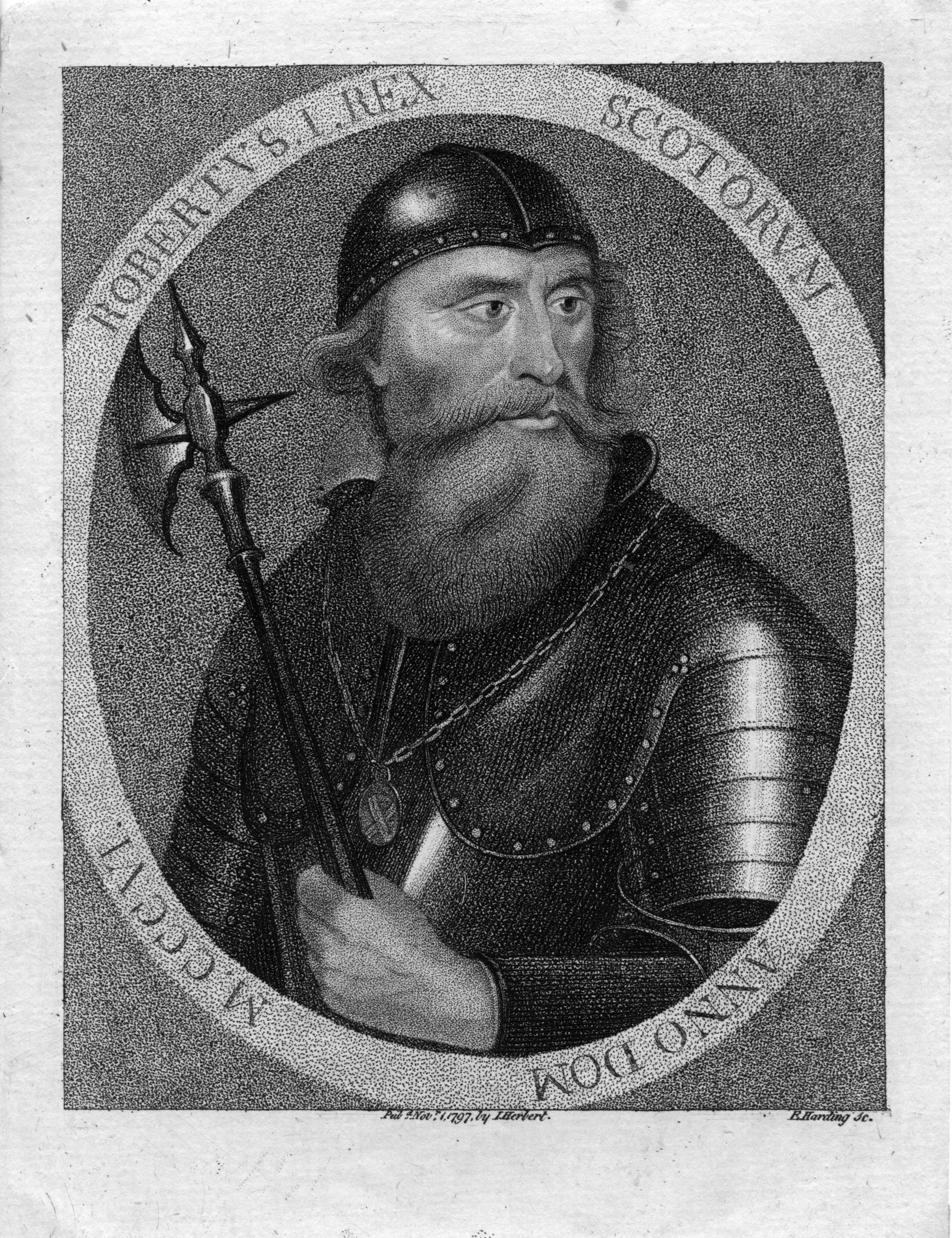
A late eighteenth century portrait of Robert I by Edward Harding

At around the same time, Isabella's father, Domhnall I, Earl of Mar, was seeking a strong ally that could protect his clan from covetous neighbors. When the succession crisis first arose, Domhnall was already amid a clan dispute with John Comyn of Badenoch. Domhnall claimed that the Comyns had pillaged his lands, and he was thus eager for an excuse to take up arms against this powerful neighbor. As the Comyns were staunch supporters of John Balliol's claim to the throne, Domhnall found a natural ally in Clan Bruce. As the chronicler, John of Fordun, wrote "all the Comyns and their whole abettors stood by Balliol; but the earls of Mar and Atholl, with the whole strength of their power, cleaved, in the firm league of kinship, to the side of Robert of Bruce." Domhnall summoned an army within a mere fortnight of Margret's death, eager and ready to support his newfound ally. This succession dispute, or "Great Cause," was what initially brought Isabella's Clan Mar and the House of Bruce together as allies.

Isabella's father sought to use Isabella to strengthen ties with the powerful Bruce family. And though Clan Mar had no shortage of enemies prior to Margret's death, the succession dispute and their siding with Bruce had brought them new opponents. There was thus a great pressure on the part of Domhnall to sow a strong bond with new allies who could protect the Mars from their growing list of enemies, and in this age of diplomatic marriage, that meant that Isabella was to wed into an allied clan. The premier choice for Isabella's spouse was the young Robert the Bruce, the Earl of Carrick and future King of Scots—and also the grandson of Robert de Brus, 5th Lord of Annandale, who was vying for the throne at that time. In the late thirteenth century, the 5th Lord of Annandale was nearing the end of his life, and thus, Domhnall saw the young Earl of Carrick as a potential future king. By pursuing a marriage between Isabella and Bruce, Domnall was not only strengthening his bond with allies, which was his primary goal but was also marrying into a powerful family that might one day rule the kingdom. Isabella, like many European noblewomen in the medieval age, was used as a diplomatic pawn by her ambitious father.

The House of Bruce's interest in Isabella was politically motivated as well, though their interest existed before the succession dispute. To the North of the Earldom of Mar laid the lordship of Garioch. Garioch was a land divided between four different co-heirs, including the House of Bruce. Two of the other co-heirs were John Balliol and John Hastings, who would later fight Bruce for the throne. In April 1290, Bruce made an agreement with Nichlas Biggar, a minor nobleman who held a legal claim to Garioch. This arrangement granted Bruce the two-thirds of the lordship which Balliol and Hastings held; yet, in the end, the arrangement was insubstantial for attaining the lordship, so Bruce turned his eyes south to Clan Mar. As historian Michael Brown wrote:

As Earl Donald's [Domnall's] earldom bordered the Garioch and since he held lands in the lordship as Balliol's vassal, Donald had a direct interest in the process. These overlapping landed concerns may have fuelled the growing political alignment between Mar and Bruce which was, once again, formalised through marriage.

Even before the succession dispute, the House of Bruce sought a marriage with Clan Mar to strengthen their claim on the lordship of Garioch. Their interests would only "overlap" further with Margret's death and Balliol's rival claim. The marriage between Isabella and Bruce was thus politically motivated—the two clans shared enemies and sought to strengthen their political ties through the marriage.

== Robert the Bruce and Marjorie Bruce ==
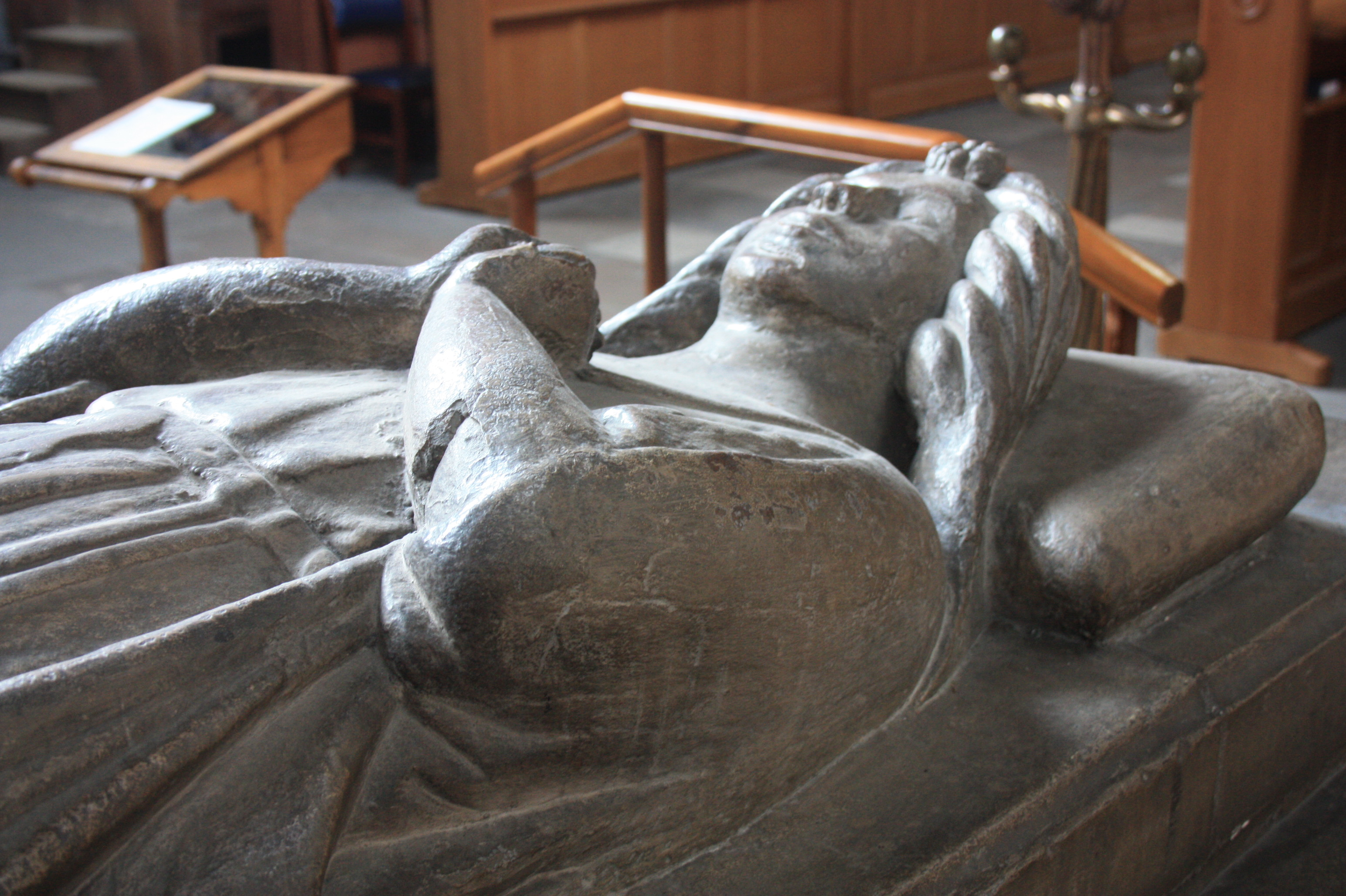
A depiction of Marjorie Bruce on her tomb in Paisley Abbey.

Isabella died shortly after her marriage with Robert the Bruce, but not before delivering her daughter, Marjorie Bruce. The details of Isabella's death, like her life, are obscured by a lack of primary sources; however, it is likely she died during-—or shortly after—Marjorie's birth in 1296. Death during childbirth was far from uncommon in the medieval age. As medievalist, Jennifer Edwards, has noted, childbirth in the medieval age was "dangerous for all women [...] Pregnancy and childbirth were recognized as perilous, as well as uncomfortable, times." However, Isabella's early death—at around the age of 19—was atypical, even for the medieval age. Most women who died during childbirth were much older than Isabella; as a point of comparison, modern scholars have estimated that the average age of Norwich women in the 11th century was only 33. This was due to the frequency of childbirth—as Edwards explained, "this statistic does correlate with the time when women were most likely on a second, third, or subsequent pregnancy and thus most at risk of death in childbirth." So, while death during childbirth was not unusual, Isabella's death during her first pregnancy was premature, even for the time.

The year of Marjorie's birth (1296) was a chaotic time for her father, as on 26 March 1296 seven Scottish earls loyal to Comyn launched a surprise attack on Carlisle, Bruce's principal residence at the time. The attack failed, but it proved to be a catalyst to English King Edward's growing frustration with the Scots. In 1296, John Balliol successfully beat Bruce to the throne after being elected by a group of noblemen selected by Edward. But Balliol did not remain loyal to Edward for long, and soon made an alliance with his most powerful enemy—the French. Edward saw the creation of this "Auld Alliance" as a betrayal, and with the recent attack on Carlisle—which Edward considered an attack on England itself—he lost all patience with the Scots. He marched his armies north in March 1296, beginning the Scottish Wars of Independence, and winning substantial victories at Berwick and Dunbar, eventually deposing the then King of Scots, John Balliol. By July 1297, Bruce had joined in the revolt, fighting the English and coaxing Edward towards negotiations. After numerous defeats, Edward signed a treaty in exchange for an oath of allegiance, and due to Bruce's habit of turning coat, Edward ordered that Bruce provide the infant Marjorie as a hostage—as collateral for her father's loyalty. The details of what occurred next are sparse, but Bruce never delivered Marjorie. Why Edward did not retaliate against this blatant disobedience is unknown. The Guardian of Scotland at that time, William Wallace, did not sign the treaty and was still in open revolt. Wallace received a devastating loss from Edward at Falkirk, and with that, the revolt was extinguished. Edward then marched back to England, seemingly content with his victories and made no further demands for Marjorie.

Bruce remained nominally loyal to Edward until 10 February 1306, when he murdered his rival, John Comyn, at the high altar of the Chapel of Greyfriars Monastery in Dumfries. With his rival defeated, Bruce broke his allegiance to Edward and attacked the English garrisoned at Dumfries Castle. Later that year, on 25 March 1306, Bruce was officially crowned King of Scots. Edward marched North that spring to depose his former ally.

Though Bruce lost most of his initial battles as King, he remained elusive and escaped Edward's grasp time and time again. In June 1306, Edward's forces dealt Bruce a devastating defeat at the Battle of Methven. To keep his family out of Edward's hands, Bruce sent word to his brother, Neil, and to the Earl of Atholl requesting that they take Marjorie and his wife to Kildrummy Castle until it was safe. They lived there briefly for a few months until September 1306, when Edward II, Prince of Wales, personally led an assault on the castle. The outnumbered Scots received yet another devastating defeat, but this time there was nowhere to run and the Scottish lords at Kildrummy were captured and executed, including Neil Bruce. The Earl of Atholl, however, managed to escape and took Robert's wife, his sister, and Marjorie into hiding. They were betrayed days after their flight by Uilleam II, Earl of Ross, a supporter of Balliol, who handed Atholl and the Bruces over to the English. The Earl of Atholl was executed, but Queen Elizabeth and the twelve-year-old Marjorie and were taken alive and held hostage for nearly a decade.

The details of Marjorie's captivity are also sparse. A cage was built for her outside the Tower of London, likely designed for the same purpose as the one made for Isabella MacDuff, the Countess of Buchan who oversaw Bruce's coronation. MacDuff's cage was set in the public's view outside Berwick Castle as a warning to rebels and, possibly, as a ploy to coax Bruce out of hiding. According to the chronicle, Flores Historiarum, Edward ordered:

Because she has not struck with the sword, she shall not die by the sword; but, on account of the unlawful coronation which she performed, let her be closely confined in an abode of stone and iron, made in the shape of a crown, and let her be hung up out of doors in the open air at Berwick, that both in her life and after her death she may be a spectacle and eternal reproach to travellers.

Marjorie's aunt, Mary Bruce, was held in a similar cage outside Roxburgh Castle, and endured exposure and public humiliation as MacDuff did. Marjorie however, in the end, was spared this ordeal. Perhaps Edward felt Mary's and MacDuff's humiliation sufficed enough, though, there is no evidence to definitively say why Edward decided to spare Marjorie from her cage; instead, Edward sent her to the Gilbertine convent in Watton, where she lived in virtual isolation for the next seven years.

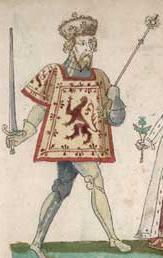
16th century depiction of Robert II

Bruce fought another seven hard years for his family and crown, culminating in the Battle of Bannockburn which saw a Scottish victory over an English army more than triple their size. During the fight, the English Humphrey de Bohun, 4th Earl of Hereford, was captured. Bruce leveraged this powerful Earl for Marjorie's release, and in October 1314, the two sides met and exchanged the English Earl for the Scottish Princess. Of course, Bruce himself was not there for the exchange; instead, he sent the young Walter Stewart—the 6th High Steward of Scotland and hero of Bannockburn—in his stead to the Anglo-Scottish border to retrieve Marjorie and her family. Walter and Marjorie—who were about the same age—evidently took a liking to each other, as the following year (1315), the two married; and with that, the lines of Bruce and Stewart merged.

=== Robert II and the Stewart Dynasty ===
Marjorie conceived a child shortly after her marriage with Walter Stewart, but she did not live to see her child grow. There are different accounts of what followed, with the traditional one being that Marjorie was taking a ride to Renfrewshire in the latter stages of her pregnancy when her horse spontaneously bucked her off and onto the road, sending Marjorie into premature labor and, like her mother, to her untimely demise at the young age of twenty. However, her child, Robert II, was alive and healthy.

While Robert the Bruce did remarry to Elizabeth de Burgh and fathered a young son with her, David II, David was last of the House of Bruce to hold the crown. Though David married several women during his reign and had even more mistresses, he died without children in the year 1371. Since David was the only male heir of Robert's, Isabella's descendants became the next in line for the throne. The grandson of Isabella and son of Marjorie Bruce, Robert II, succeeded to the throne in place of his childless uncle, continuing the Bruce lineage as the first Stewart to hold the crown.

== Sources ==
- Barrow, GWS (2004). "Stewart family (per. c.1110–c.1350)". Oxford Dictionary of National Biography (online ed.). Oxford University Press. doi:10.1093/ref:odnb/49411. (Subscription, Wikipedia Library access or UK public library membership required.)
- Barrow, GWS (2008). "Robert I [Robert Bruce] (1274–1329)". Oxford Dictionary of National Biography (online ed.). Oxford University Press. doi:10.1093/ref:odnb/3754. (Subscription, Wikipedia Library access or UK public library membership required.)
- Paton, H; Reid, NH (2004). "Donald, sixth earl of Mar (d. in or after 1297)". Oxford Dictionary of National Biography (online ed.). Oxford University Press. doi:10.1093/ref:odnb/18020. (Subscription, Wikipedia Library access or UK public library membership required.)
