= Isabel Bruce =

Queen of Norway from 1293 to 1299

Queen consort of Norway
- Tenure: 1293–1299
- Born: 1272; Carrick, Scotland
- Died: 1358 (aged 85–86); Bergen, Norway
- Spouse: Eric II of Norway (m. 1293; died 1299)
- Issue: Ingeborg Eriksdottir of Norway
- House: Bruce
- Father: Robert de Brus, 6th Lord of Annandale
- Mother: Marjorie, Countess of Carrick

Isabel Bruce (Isabella de Brus or Isobail a Brus, or Isabella Robertsdotter Brus) (c. 1272–1358) was Queen of Norway as the wife of King Eric II.

== Background ==
Arms

Isabel was born in Carrick, Scotland. Her parents were Robert de Brus, 6th Lord of Annandale and Marjorie, Countess of Carrick. Her brothers included Robert the Bruce, future King of Scots, and Edward Bruce who would be High King of Ireland briefly. In 1293 at the age of 21, she traveled to Norway with her father and was married at Bergen to King Eric. Her dowry for the marriage was recorded at the time by Norwegian nobleman Audun Hugleiksson who noted she brought: precious clothes, 2 golden boiler, 24 silver plate, 4 silver salt cellars and 12 two-handled soup bowls (scyphus) to the marriage.

Isabel was king Erik's second wife, he having previously been married to the daughter of King Alexander III of Scotland, Margaret of Scotland, who died in childbirth in 1283. Upon the death of King Alexander three years later, his granddaughter, Eric's daughter Margaret, Maid of Norway became heir to the throne of Scotland. King Eric arranged the marriage of his daughter to the English King Edward I's son Edward, which became moot upon the child's death in 1290. The death of Queen Margaret left Scotland without a monarch, and at the mercy of Edward I of England.

Soon, John Balliol tried to take the Scottish crown with the aid of John Comyn, the Red Comyn. The Bruce family captured strongholds in Galloway, and fighting in the name of the Maid of Norway (Margaret), suppressed the rebellion with many important families like the Stewards supporting them. At the time of Isabel's marriage in 1293, her brother was one of the claimants to the Scottish throne. The Bruces were aligned with King Edward against King John Balliol and his Comyn allies. In 1306, Robert the Bruce was chosen to be King of Scotland. Scottish historian G.W.S. Barrow observed that King Eric's renewed contacts with Scotland "increased the ties of friendship which bound him to the English king."

== Activity ==
Isabel was widowed, at age 26, at the death of King Eric in 1299. Erik was succeeded by his brother, King Haakon V of Norway who reigned until his own death in 1319. Isabel never remarried, despite surviving her husband by 59 years. Their marriage did not produce a male heir, though it did produce a daughter, Ingeborg Eriksdottir of Norway, who, having firstly been engaged to Jon II, Earl of Orkney, married Valdemar Magnusson of Sweden, Duke of Finland, in 1312. Isabel herself arranged both engagements.

She did not return to Scotland, but lived in Bergen, Norway, the rest of her life, and died there. As a queen consort, there is little information about her life, but her life as a queen dowager is better documented. Queen Isabel participated in many official events and ceremonies and did not lack influence. She was present with the royal couple at the inauguration in 1305 of Bishop Arne Sigurdssön, the new Bishop of Bergen. She had a good relationship with the clerical powers in Bergen, made donations and in 1324, received several houses from the church. It has been suggested, that she participated as a mediator in the negotiations between Norway and Scotland regarding Orkney and Shetland during 1312 under which the Treaty of Perth was reaffirmed. In 1339, the king pardoned a prisoner at her request. She exchanged letters with her sister Christina Bruce and sent soldiers in her support. In 1357, she was one of the heirs of her daughter Ingebjorg, Duchess of Uppland, Öland and Finland.

== Other sources ==
- Blakely, Ruth Margaret (2005) The Brus Family in England and Scotland, 1100-1295 (Boydell Press) ISBN 978-1-84383-152-5
- Penman, Michael (2014) Robert the Bruce: King of the Scots (Yale University Press) ISBN 978-0-30014-872-5

Preceded by Margaret of Scotland	Queen consort of Norway; 1293–1299	Succeeded by Eufemia of Rügen
