= Treaty of Birgham =

1289 and 1290 treaties between England and Scotland

The Treaty of Birgham, also referred to as the Treaty of Salisbury, comprised two treaties in 1289 and 1290 intended to secure the independence of Scotland after the death of Alexander III of Scotland and accession of his three-year-old granddaughter Margaret, Maid of Norway in 1286. They were negotiated and signed by the Guardians of Scotland, who were ruling in Margaret's name due to her age.

The first treaty was concluded in Salisbury in November 1289 and relates to the arrangements by which Edward I of England would secure the transport of the Maid of Norway from her homeland to Edward's own custody until Scotland was made safe for her to take up her right as queen. The Maid's father, Eric II of Norway, while keen for his daughter to take up her right in Scotland, had been concerned for her safety given the political instability in Scotland. Edward I was able to broker her transfer from Norway, assuaging Eric's fears with his own personal guarantees for the infant girl's safety and also settling the matter of the outstanding dowry payments which Alexander III still owed to Eric for the marriage of his daughter, also named Margaret, to the Norwegian king. Guaranteed by Edward I, the purpose of the treaty was to put to rest the competing claims for the Crown of Scotland by the House of Balliol and the House of Bruce.

The second treaty was drawn up at Birgham (Berwickshire) on 18 July 1290 and ratified at Northampton on 28 August 1290. Under the condition that Margaret would marry Edward's son, Scotland was to remain "separate and divided from England according to its rightful boundaries, free in itself and without subjection." The treaty specified that even though a wife's possessions should become her husband's upon marriage, in this case it would not. It stated upon Margaret and Edward's marriage that the Church of Scotland and Church of England were to be made separate, that the owner of lands in Scotland shall not have them disinherited. It made sure that the Parliament of England and Parliament of Scotland were to remain separate and not be held outside of their respective country.

The treaty proved ineffectual, both because Margaret died en route to Scotland in 1290, and because English negotiators had included enough reservations to render the independence clauses useless. In 1291 Edward summoned the Scottish nobles to meet him at Norham-on-Tweed and styled himself overlord of Scotland ('Lord Paramount of Scotland') and challenged claimants to the Scottish throne to recognise himself as a feudal superior as a condition of his agreeing to arbitrate the various claims.
