= Alexander, Prince of Scotland =

Heir apparent to Alexander III (1264–1284)

Alexander of Scotland
- Born: 21 January 1264
- Died: 28 January 1284 (aged 20)
- Burial: Dunfermline Abbey
- Spouse: Margaret of Flanders
- House: Dunkeld
- Father: Alexander III of Scotland
- Mother: Margaret of England

Alexander (21 January 1264 – 28 January 1284) was an heir apparent to the throne of the Kingdom of Scotland who never acceded due to his early death.

== Early life ==
Alexander was born on 21 January 1264. He was the second child and elder son of King Alexander III of Scotland and Margaret of England, preceded by a daughter named Margaret and followed by a son called David. The Scottish crown was determined that the young Alexander should be adequately established. In 1270, he was made Earl of Fife for the duration of the minority of the heir to the earldom, Duncan III, who was then eight years old. Probably sometime after 1275, Alexander was also made Lord of Mann, which gave him revenue and a "quasi-royal position of dignity" while also assuring the people of the island that the recently established Scottish rule would be efficient.

== Marriage ==
Alexander's mother, Queen Margaret, died in 1275. It is evident from the letters of Alexander and his sister that the family remained close to their maternal uncle King Edward I of England. Alexander's brother, David, died in 1281, the year when their sister married King Eric II of Norway. King Alexander did not seek a second wife for about ten years, focusing instead on arranging a suitable marriage for his surviving son, the young Alexander. In 1281, the King started negotiating with Guy, Count of Flanders, about his son's marriage to the Count's daughter, also named Margaret. The couple were married on 14 November 1282 at Roxburgh and the marriage was celebrated the following day.

== Death ==
Alexander's sister died in Norway whilst giving birth in 1283, leaving Alexander as the sole surviving child of the King of Scotland. A week after his twentieth birthday, on 28 January 1284, the young Alexander also died. He was buried at Dunfermline Abbey. By April it was clear that his widow was not pregnant and that his sister's daughter, Margaret, Maid of Norway, was the new heir presumptive. King Alexander hastened to contract a second marriage, choosing Yolanda of Dreux, but died in 1286.

== Bibliography ==
- Barrow, G. W. S. (1990). A Kingdom in Crisis: Scotland and the Maid of Norway. Vol. 69. Edinburgh University Press. pp. 120–141.
- Chisholm, Hugh, ed. (1911). "Dunfermline" . Encyclopædia Britannica. Vol. 8 (11th ed.). Cambridge University Press. pp. 678–679.
- Duncan, Archibald Alexander McBeth (2002). The Kingship of the Scots, 842-1292: Succession and Independence. Edinburgh University Press. ISBN 0748616268.
- Fegley, Randall (2002). The Golden Spurs of Kortrijk: How the Knights of France Fell to the Foot Soldiers of Flanders in 1302. McFarland & Co. ISBN 0786480548.
- Prestwich, Michael (1988). Edward I. University of California Press. ISBN 0520062663.
