= Margaret of Norway =

Margaret of Norway may refer to:

- Margaret of Scotland, Queen of Norway (1261–1283)
- Margaret, Maid of Norway (1283–1290), disputed queen regnant of Scots
- Margaret I of Denmark (1353–1412), queen regnant of Norway, regent of Denmark and Sweden, and founder of the Kalmar Union
- Margaret of Denmark (1456–1486), queen consort of Scotland
