= Domhnall, Earl of Mar =

Domhnall, Earl of Mar may refer to:

- Domhnall I, Earl of Mar
- Domhnall II, Earl of Mar
