= False Margaret =

Norwegian woman who impersonated Margaret, Maid of Norway

False Margaret (or Margareth or Margareta) (c. 1260 – 1301) was a Norwegian woman who impersonated Margaret, Maid of Norway.

The real Margaret had died in 1290 at Orkney, and her father, King Eric II, died in 1299, succeeded by his brother King Haakon V. The following year a woman arrived at Bergen, Norway in a ship from Lübeck, Germany, claiming to be Margaret, and accused several people of treason. She claimed that she had not died in Orkney, had been sold by Tore Haakonsson's wife Ingeborg, and sent to Germany, where she had married. The people of Bergen and some of the clergy there supported her claim, even though the late King Erik had identified his dead daughter's body, and even though the woman appeared to be about 40 years old, whereas the real Margaret would have been 17.

She was burned at the stake for treason at Nordnes in Bergen in 1301, and her husband was beheaded. She may have been used by Audun Hugleiksson as a pawn in the plot against the Maid's uncle, Haakon V.

The story of the betrayed Princess was spread through popular ballads in Norway and Scotland. Some years later a small St Margaret Church (Margaretaskirk) was built in Bergen near the place of execution, although this was frowned on by the authorities, and it became the centre of a local martyr cult. The eventual fate of the church is uncertain, but it was probably demolished around the time of the Reformation.

== Sources ==
- Helle, Knut (1990). "Norwegian Foreign Policy and the Maid of Norway". The Scottish Historical Review. 69. Edinburgh University Press: 142–156.
