= Domhnall I, Earl of Mar =

13th-century Scottish noble

- Died: between 1297 and 1302
- Spouse: Elen ferch Llywelyn (the Younger)
- Issue: Gartnait, Earl of Mar; Isabella of Mar
- Father: Uilleam of Mar

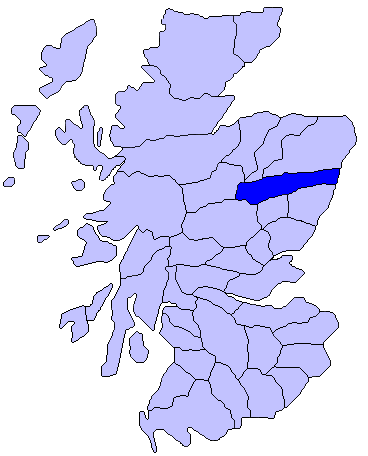
Location of Mar within Scotland

Domhnall I, Earl of Mar, also known by the name Domhnall mac Uilleim (Anglicized as "Donald, William's son"), was the seventh known mormaer of Mar in medieval Scotland, ruling from the death of his father, Uilleam of Mar, in 1276 until his own death sometime between 1297 and 1302. If Gille Críst is excluded, Domhnall I is considered the sixth mormaer or Earl of Mar.

In 1284, he joined with other Scottish noblemen who acknowledged Margaret of Norway as the heir to King Alexander III. Domhnall was later a strong supporter of the Bruce cause during the crisis of the late 13th century. He was at Norham in 1292, probably in the camp of Robert de Brus, then Earl of Carrick.

== Family ==
Domhnall married Helen after 1266 (sometimes called Ellen or Elen), the widow of Maol Choluim II, Earl of Fife. It has been claimed that she was a daughter of Llywelyn the Great of Wales, though genealogical inconsistencies make it more likely that this was actually an unnamed first wife of the Earl of the Fife. By Helen, he had three sons and two daughters:

- Gartnait, his eldest son and successor, became the 8th Earl of Mar
- Duncan of Mar
- Alexander of Mar, imprisoned in the Tower of London on 12 December 1297 along with Edward Baliol, son of King John
- Isabella of Mar, married Robert I of Scotland as his first wife, mother of Marjorie Bruce, who married Walter Stewart, 6th High Steward of Scotland. Marjorie was the mother of Robert II of Scotland, the first king of Scotland from the Royal House of Stuart.
- Margaret of Mar (also called Marjory), married John of Strathbogie, 9th Earl of Atholl

The last surviving record of Domhnall dates to 1297, and the earliest record of his son Gartnait as Earl dates to 1305; therefore, it is believed that Domhnall died sometime between these two dates. A document dating to 1302 suggests that Domhnall had just died. The document contains terms of reconciliation between Edward I of England and Robert the Bruce, and stipulates that Robert should act as warden of Gartnait.

Preceded by Uilleam	Mormaer of Mar; 1276–1301	Succeeded by Gartnait
