= Christ Church, Bergen =

Cathedral in Bergen, Norway

Coordinates: 60.4003°N 5.31671°E

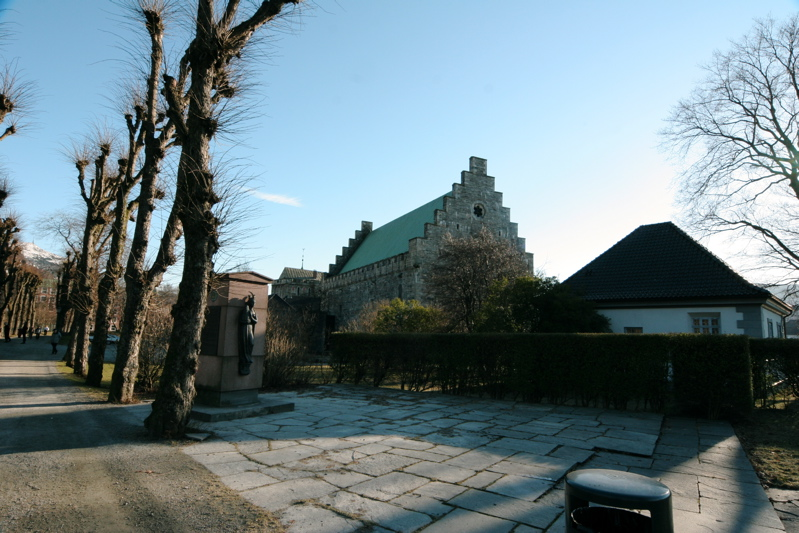
Christ Church floor plan at Bergenhus

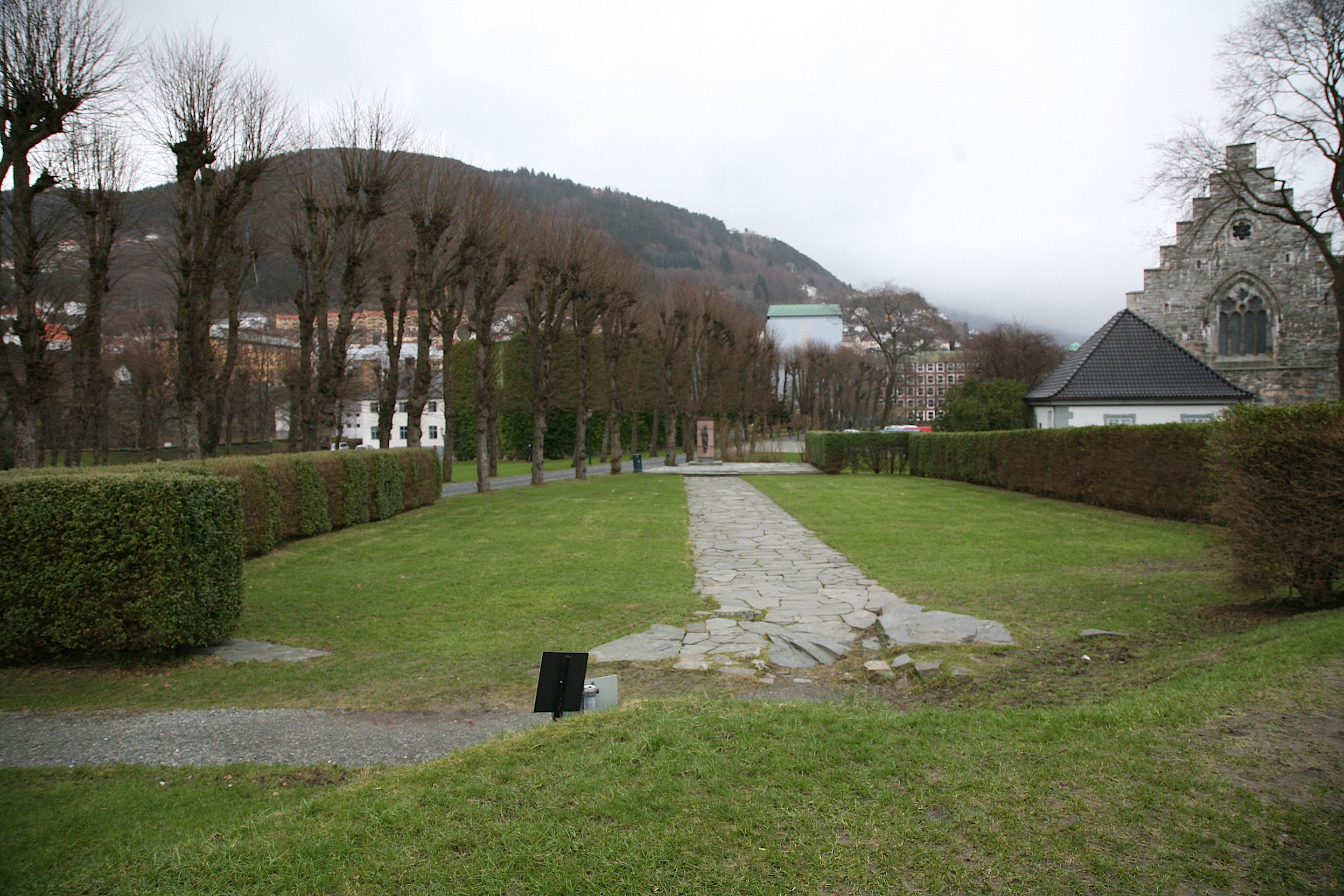
Christ Church site with hedge is placed where the outer walls are thought to have been

Christ Church on Holmen (Kristkirken på Holmen i Bergen) was the main medieval era cathedral of Bergen, Norway. Its site was near Haakon's hall (Håkonshallen) and Bergenhus Fortress (Bergenhus festning).

== History ==
Christ Church was built by King Olav Kyrre during the period 1066–1093. In 1170 the relics of Saint Sunniva were moved here from Selja and placed on the main altar. During Bergen's period as the capital of Norway in the 13th century, the area known as Holmen contained the royal residence in Bergen, as well as Christ Church, several other churches, the bishop's residence, and a Dominican monastery. Holmen and Christ Church formed the political centre of the country. The church itself was used for negotiations and the churchyard was used for hailing of kings and meetings of the realm. The first coronation in Scandinavia was held in Bergen in 1163 and several coronations were held in the church when it was finished. The kings were also married and buried in the church.

In 1531, the church was levelled to the ground by order of Eske Bille who was Commander of Bergenhus Fortress from 1529 to 1537. A similar fate happened to the city's Apostel Church. Both churches and other buildings were removed in order to strengthen the defense of the city and port and with the consent of Bishop Olav Torkelsson.

== Coronations ==
- Magnus V in 1163 or 1164
- Sverre on 29 June 1194
- Haakon IV and Margaret Skulesdatter on 29 July 1247
- Magnus VI and Ingeborg of Denmark on 14 September 1261
- Eric II in 1280
- Margaret of Scotland in 1281

== Burials ==
- Saint Sunniva in 1170
- Sverre in 1202
- Haakon III in 1204
- Haakon IV in 1263
- Margaret of Scotland in 1283
- Margaret, Maid of Norway, in 1290
- Eric II in 1299
