= Koengen =

Concert venue in Bergen, Norway

Coordinates: 60.400°N 5.320°E

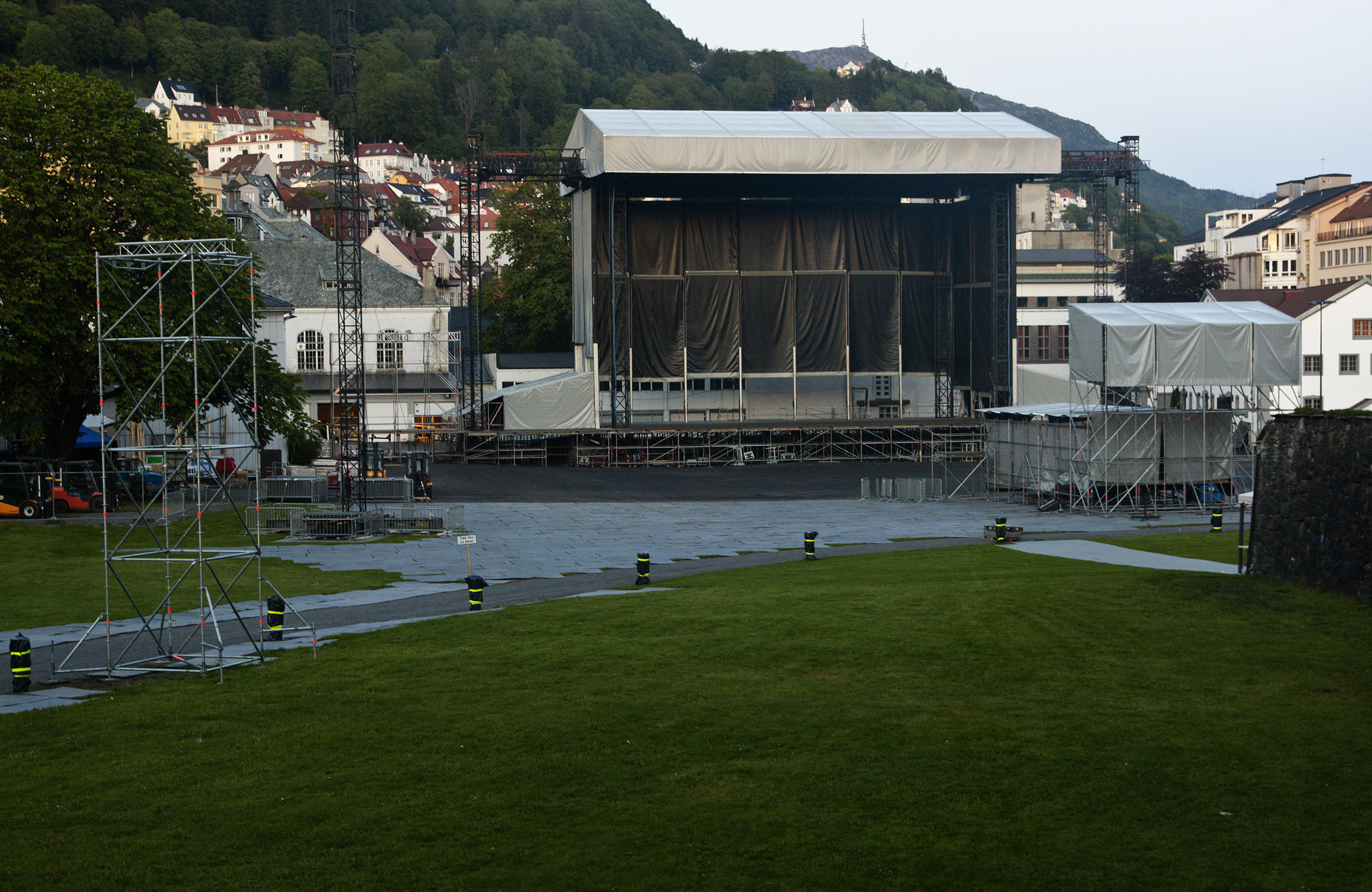
Koengen a day before the Eagles concert on June 1, 2009.

Koengen is an outdoor concert venue in the city centre of Bergen, Norway. The concert venue has a capacity of approximately 23,500 people.

Formerly an army depot, it is located next to the medieval Bergenhus Fortress.

Recent acts to perform here include Elton John, The Weeknd, Muse, Anastacia, David Bowie, Iron Maiden, Kanye West, The Eagles, Coldplay, Bruce Springsteen, Tinie Tempah, Santigold, Avenged Sevenfold, Bob Dylan, Suzanne Vega, Hatebreed, Rolling Stones, Rammstein, Alice In Chains, Phil Collins, Metallica, Slayer, Foo Fighters, Eric Clapton, Kiss, Iron Maiden, R.E.M., Neil Young, Sting, Bon Jovi, Paul McCartney, Rihanna and Bruno Mars.
