= Andrew de Rait =

Coat of arms of Andrew de Rait

Sir Andrew de Rait of Rait (born c.1280) was a 13th-14th century Scottish noble. Andrew de Rait was the younger brother of Gervase de Rait, Constable of Invernairn. Andrew was Constable of Nairn Castle in 1296. He appears on the 1296 Ragman Roll giving homage to King Edward I of England. He succeeded to his brother's estates and titles in 1297.

Arms: Argent, a cross indented Gules

== Scottish Wars of Independence ==
After Edward I sacked Berwick in March 1296 and the Scottish king John Balliol abdicated the following July, Edward held a parliament at Berwick on 28 August to receive the submission of the Scottish barons and clerics. Sir Andrew de Rait and his older brother, Gervaise, paid homage for Nairnshire. Sir Andrew supported Edward in 1297 when Sir Andrew Moray launched an assault against Urquhart Castle, then under English control. He went north with those sent by Edward to put down Moray's revolt under the leadership of Henry le Chen, Bishop of Aberdeen; John Comyn, Earl of Buchan; and Gartnait of Mar, son and heir of the Earl of Mar. Although Edward's contingent met with Moray near the River Spey on 7 July, they did not seize him, blaming the difficulties of the terrain for preventing further pursuit. Andrew de Rait was selected to bear the bishop's letter of explanation to King Edward:

In Launoy upon-the-Spey on the Tuesday before the feast of St. Mary Magdalene, there met us Andrew de Murray with a large body of rogues, the number of which Sir Andrew de Raite, your bachelor, can show you according to what he heard from the people of their company. And the aforesaid rogues betook themselves into a very great stronghold of bog and wood, where no horseman could be of service. It would be too long a business to write, but we pray you to have the goodness to give evidence to Sir Andrew de Raite, your bachelor, who can tell you all these affairs in all points, for he was in person at all these doings.

Euphemia, Countess of Ross and Malise III, Earl of Strathearn, also entrusted Sir Andrew with dispatches to the king, the latter writing, "Dear Sire, I pray you, if it please you, to have the goodness to believe Sir Andrew de Raite, the bearer of this letter, in the matter which he will tell you verbally from me".

En route, Sir Andrew met with Hugh de Cressingham, treasurer of the English administration in Scotland, and showed him the bishop's letter, but Cressingham reported to the king that the letter was "false in many points and obscure". It has been argued that Cressingham believed that Chien, Comyn, and Mar were "exaggerating the value of the services they had rendered" in the hope that the king, in his gratitude, would reward them with "the estates of their rivals".
