= Margaret of England =

Queen of Scotland from 1251 to 1275

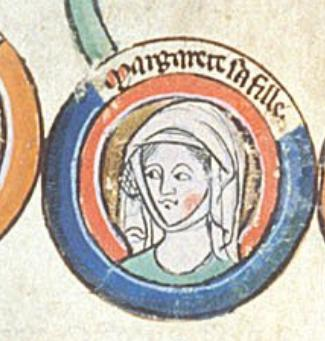

Queen consort of Alba (Scotland)
- Tenure: 26 December 1251 – 26 February 1275
- Born: 29 September 1240; Windsor Castle
- Died: 26 February 1275 (aged 34); Cupar Castle
- Burial: Dunfermline Abbey, Fife
- Spouse: Alexander III of Scotland (m. 1251)
- Issue more...: Margaret, Queen of Norway; Alexander, Prince of Scotland
- House: Plantagenet
- Father: Henry III of England
- Mother: Eleanor of Provence

Margaret of England (29 September 1240 – 26 February 1275) was Queen of Alba (Scotland) by marriage to King Alexander III.

== Life ==
Margaret was the second child of King Henry III of England and his wife, Eleanor of Provence, and was born at Windsor Castle. Margaret's first appearance in historical record comes when she was three years old, when she and her brother, the future Edward I, took part in an event in London.

King Alexander II of Scotland had previously been married to her paternal aunt, Joan of England. In 1244, her father and Alexander II met in Newcastle to resume peaceful relations between the two nations, and it was decided that the future Alexander III of Scotland should marry Margaret. She was betrothed the same year.

She was married on 25 December 1251, when she was 11 years old, at York Minster, to King Alexander III of Scotland, who was 10 years of age. The couple remained in York until January of the following year, when they continued their residence in Edinburgh.

Margaret is said to have been unhappy in Scotland and to have created some tension between England and Scotland by writing to her family in England that she was poorly treated in Scotland. Because of their age, it was not considered suitable for the royal couple to have sexual intercourse. Margaret was therefore not allowed to see Alexander very often, and because she had evidently been given a good impression of him and came to be fond of him, this made her displeased. Further more, she did not like the royal castle and hated Edinburgh, and the climate in Scotland, and she missed England and her family there. She wrote of her homesickness and complaints to her parents, who asked for her to visit them. The Scots, however, refused permission, because of the risk that she would never return.

In 1255, Queen Eleanor sent her physician to Edinburgh to investigate Margaret's well-being. He reported that she was pale and depressed, and complained about loneliness and neglect. Her father sent a new delegation, wrote to some of the Scottish earls and demanded that she be better treated. Queen Margaret complained to her father's envoys that she was kept as a prisoner without the permission to travel, and that she was not allowed to see her spouse nor be intimate with him. After this, the king of England and the regency council of Scotland came to an agreement. It was agreed that as the royal couple were now fourteen, they should be allowed to consummate their marriage, and the regency council would be obliged to turn the power over to Alexander in seven years time: Alexander would be obliged to give Margaret physical affection, and allow her freedom to travel to visit her parents. The same year, 7 September 1255, Margaret and Alexander III visited her parents and Margaret's sister Beatrice at Wark. Margaret stayed a bit longer in England after her spouse's departure, but soon followed him when the agreement was secured.

In 1257, Margaret and Alexander were captured and held prisoner by the Comyn family, who demanded the expulsion of all foreigners from Scotland. They were eventually released after the intervention of her father and the Scottish regency council. She visited England in 1260–61, to give birth to her daughter Margaret, and 1269, to attend the translation of Edward the Confessor's relics to Westminster Abbey, both times in the company of Alexander. She was not able to attend her father's funeral in 1272 because of her pregnancy.

It was said that Margaret was responsible for the death of a young courtier, who reputedly had killed her uncle by marriage Simon de Montfort at the Battle of Evesham. She had been given this esquire as a gift from her brother Edward, who visited her in 1257. This incident took place at Kinclaven Castle near Perth in the summer of 1273, where she recuperated after the birth of her son David. While walking along the River Tay accompanied by her confessor, some maidens and several esquires one evening after supper, an English esquire went down to the river to wash his hand clean from some clay. She jokingly pushed him into the river, but he was swept to his death by a powerful current before anyone could help. This was done as a joke, and according to her confessor, she had told her maidens to push him, and everyone had laughed at first, thinking there was no danger for the esquire's life. He was, however, seized by a heavy current, and both he, as well as his servant boy who jumped in to save him, drowned. Margaret was reportedly very upset by the incident.

Margaret and Alexander were present at the coronation of Edward I in Westminster in August 1274. Margaret died on 26 February 1275 at Cupar Castle, and was buried at Dunfermline Abbey, Fife.

== Issue ==
Margaret and Alexander had:

- Margaret (28 February 1261 – 9 April 1283), who married King Eric II of Norway
- Alexander (21 January 1264 Jedburgh – 28 January 1284 Lindores Abbey)
- David (20 March 1272 – June 1281 Stirling Castle); buried in Dunfermline Abbey

== Sources ==
- Ashley, Mike (2002). British Kings & Queens. Carroll & Graf. ISBN 0-7867-1104-3. pgs 485 & 492
- Duncan, A A M (2016). The Kingship of the Scots, 842-1292: Succession and Independence. Edinburgh University Press.
- Howell, Margaret (1998). Eleanor of Provence: Queenship in Thirteenth-Century England. Blackwell Publishers Ltd.
- Tibballs, Geoff (2005). Royalty's Strangest Characters: Extraordinary But True Tales from 2,000 Years of Mad Monarchs and Raving Rulers. Chrysalis Books.
- Marshall, Rosalind, Scottish Queens, 1034–1714
- Richard Oram: The Kings and Queens of Scotland
- Timothy Venning: The Kings and Queens of Scotland
- Mike Ashley: British Kings and Queens
- Elizabeth Ewan, Sue Innes and Sian Reynolds: The Biographical Dictionary of Scottish Women
- Mike Ashley, The Chronicle of Lanercost 1272–1346
- Matthew Paris, "Chronica Majora", Vol. V, S.A. 1255

Margaret of England House of Plantagenet Born: 29 September 1240 Died: 26 February 1275
Scottish royalty
Vacant Title last held by Marie de Coucy	Queen consort of Scotland; 1251–1275	Vacant Title next held by Yolande de Dreux
