= Bergenhus Fortress =

Medieval fortress in Bergen, Norway

Coordinates: 60°24′2.11″N 5°19′3.66″E

Bergenhus festning
- Bergen, Norway
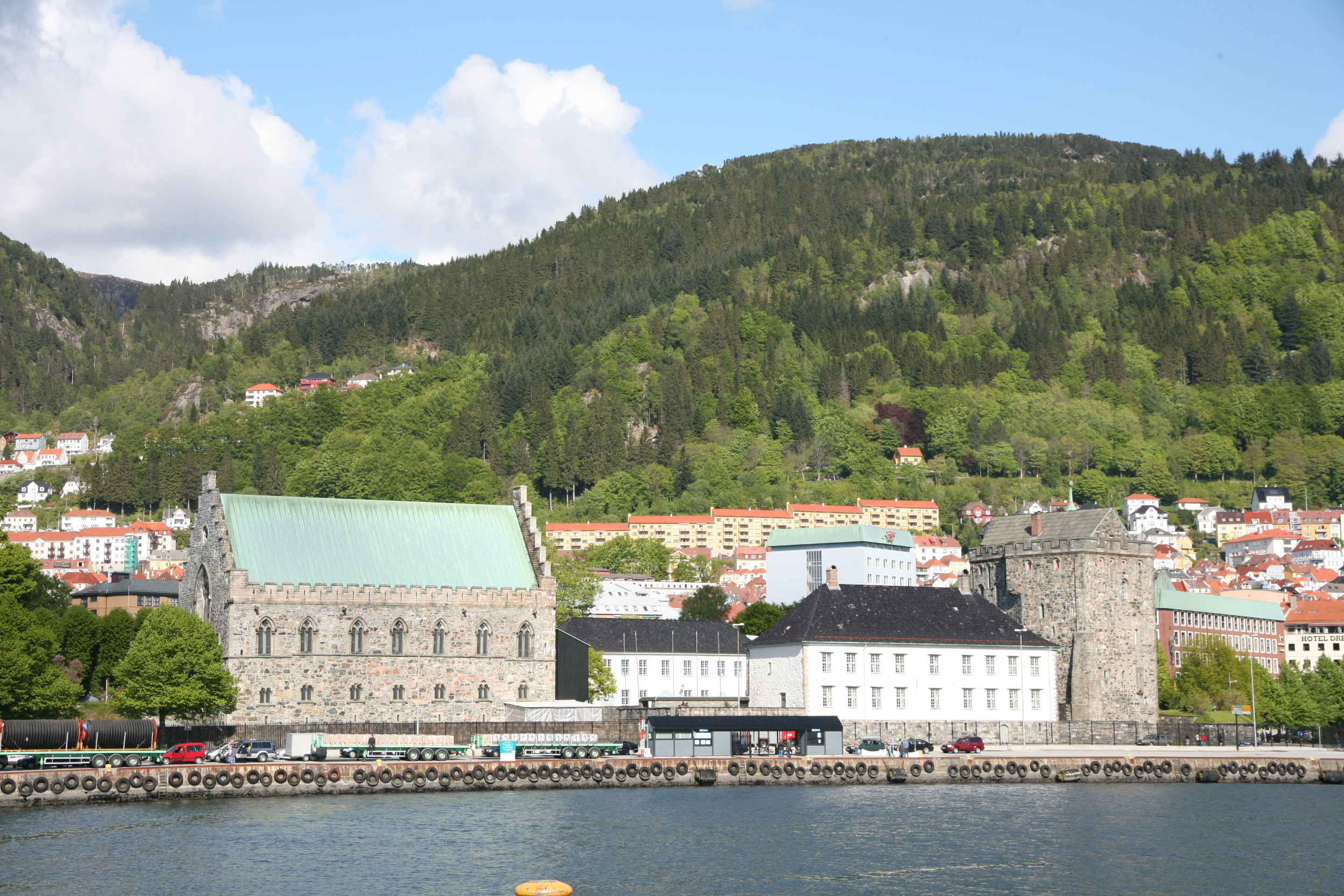
- Bergenhus Fortress

Site information
- Type: Medieval fortress
- Controlled by: Norway

Site history
- Built: 1240s
- In use: Ca.1200-today
- Materials: Stone
- Battles/wars: Battle of Vågen

Garrison information
- Past commanders: Erik Rosenkrantz

Bergenhus fortress (Norwegian: Bergenhus festning) is a fortress located in Bergen, Norway. Located at the entrance of Bergen harbour, the castle is one of the oldest and best preserved stone fortifications in Norway.

== History ==
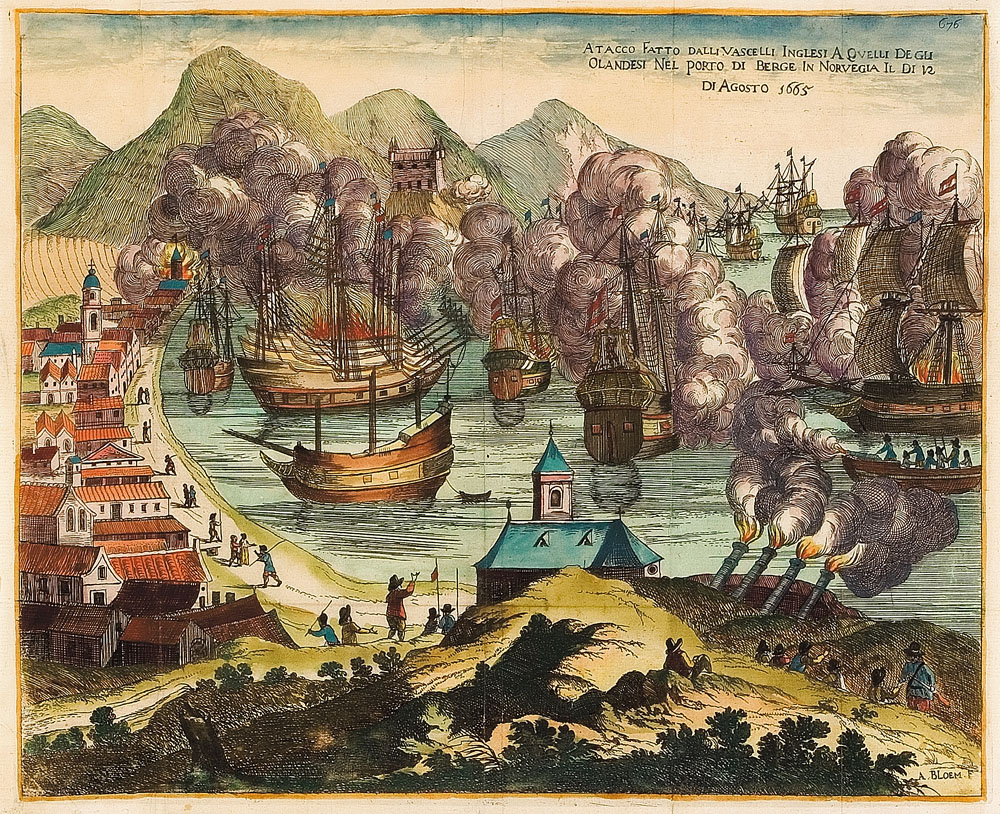
Battle of Vågen, August 12, 1665. Note that this depiction bears little or no resemblance to the actual topography of the area

The fortress contains buildings dating as early as the 1240s, as well as later constructions built as recently as World War II. The extent of the enclosed area of today dates from the early 19th century. In medieval times, the area of the present-day Bergenhus Fortress was known as Holmen and contained the royal residence in Bergen, as well as a cathedral, several churches, the bishop's residence, and a Dominican monastery. Excavations have revealed foundations of buildings believed to date back to before 1100, which might have been erected by King Olav Kyrre. In the 13th century, until 1299, Bergen was the capital of Norway and Holmen was thus the main seat of Norway's rulers. It was first enclosed by stone walls in the 1240s.

Of the medieval buildings, a medieval hall and a defensive tower remain. The royal hall, today known as Haakon's Hall, was built around 1260. The defensive tower, was built around 1270 and contained a royal apartment on the top floor. In the 1560s, it was incorporated into a larger structure, which is today known as the Rosenkrantz Tower. In the Middle Ages, several churches, including Bergen's cathedral Christ Church (Kristkirken på Holmen i Bergen), were situated on the premises. These were torn down between 1526 and 1531, as the area of Holmen was converted into a purely military fortification under Danish rule. From around this time, the name Bergenhus came into use. Building work on Christ Church probably started around 1100. It contained the shrine of Saint Sunniva, the patron saint of Bergen. In the 12th and 13th centuries it was the site of several royal coronations and weddings. It was also the burial site of at least six kings, as well as other members of the royal family. The site of its altar is today marked by a memorial stone.

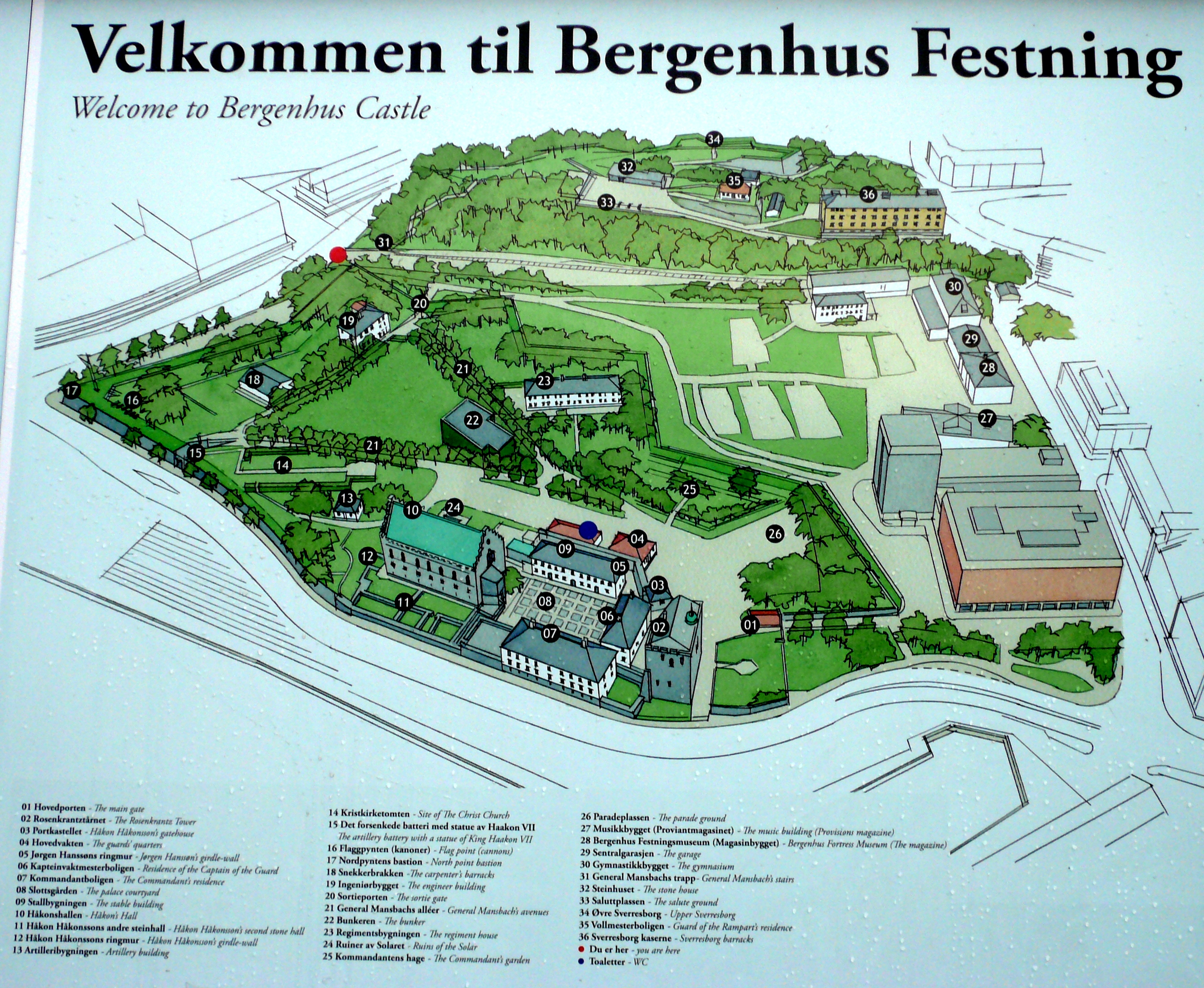
Bergenhus Fortress Map

In the 19th century, the fortress lost its function as a defensive fortification, but it was retained by the military as an administrative base. After restoration in the 1890s, and again after destruction sustained during World War II, Bergenhus is today again used as a concert venue and as a feast hall for public events. During World War II, the German navy used several of its buildings for their headquarters, and they also constructed a large concrete bunker within the fortress walls. The buildings, including Haakon's Hall, were severely damaged during World War II but the buildings were later restored.

Bergenhus is currently under the command of the Royal Norwegian Navy, which has about 150 military personnel stationed there. The fortifications Sverresborg fortress and Fredriksberg fortress also lie in the centre of Bergen. Haakon's Hall and Rosenkrantz Tower are open for visits by the public. Koengen, the central part of Bergenhus Fortress is also known as a concert venue.

== Prominent buildings ==
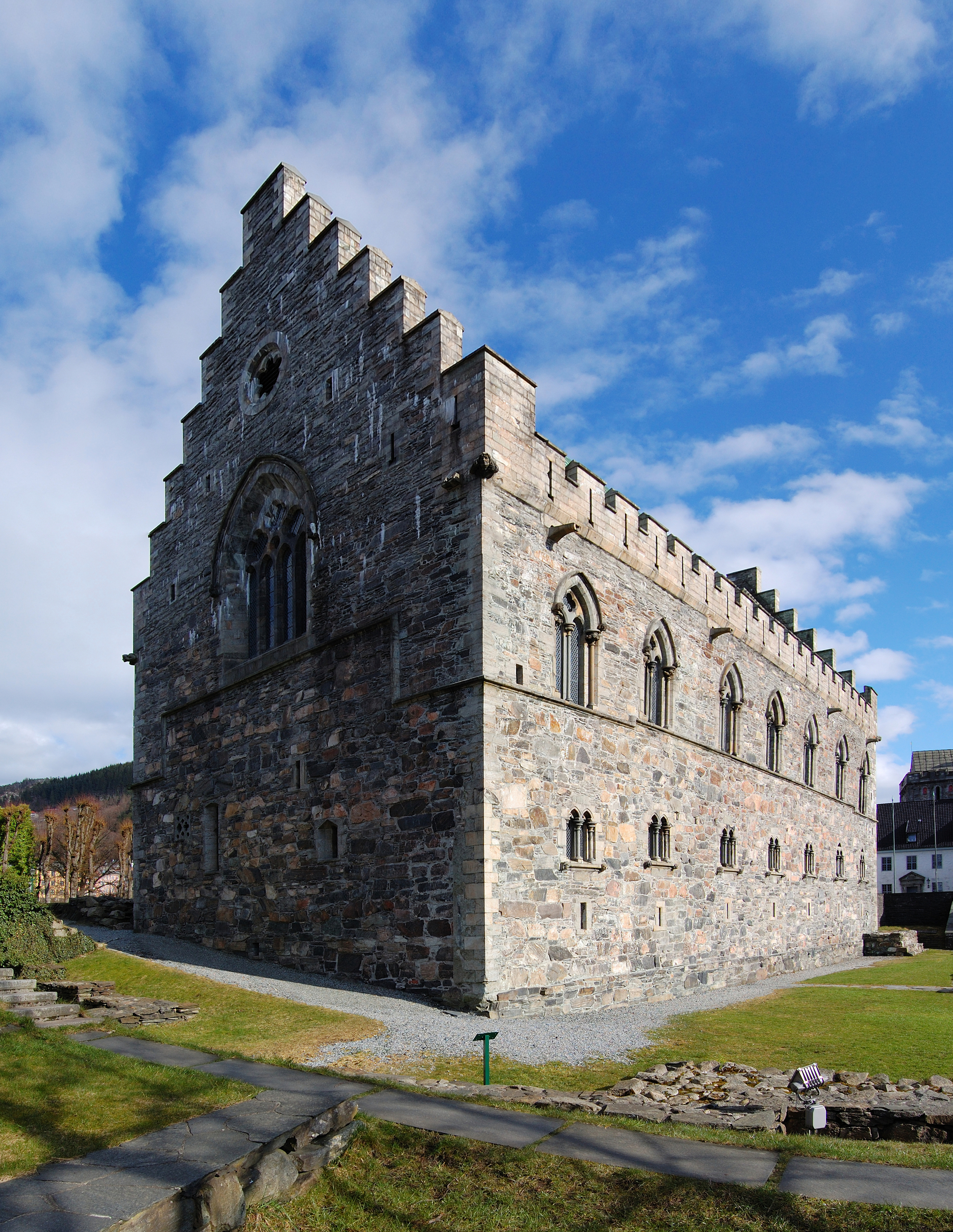
Haakon's Hall

=== Haakon's Hall ===
Haakon's Hall (Norwegian: Håkonshallen) is a medieval stone hall located inside the fortress. The hall was constructed in the middle of the 13th century, during the reign of King Håkon Håkonsson (1217–1263). In medieval times, it was the largest building of the royal palace in Bergen. It is the largest secular medieval building in Norway and the likely inspiration to similar great halls that were built on the royal estates in Oslo and Avaldsnes.

No written records survive of the construction of the hall. According to Håkon Håkonsson's saga the building was not there at the coronation of King Håkon in 1247. It does, however, state that it was used during the wedding celebrations of King Magnus Håkonsson and the Danish princess Ingebjørg Eriksdatter on 11 September 1261. The hall is built in Gothic style. In addition to the great hall, there were two more levels, a cellar and a middle floor. The hall's similarity to English structures of the same time, and the fact that monumental stone building was relatively uncommon in Norway at the time, has led to an assumption that the hall was designed by English architects, possibly the court architect of King Henry III of England, with whom King Håkon was on friendly terms.

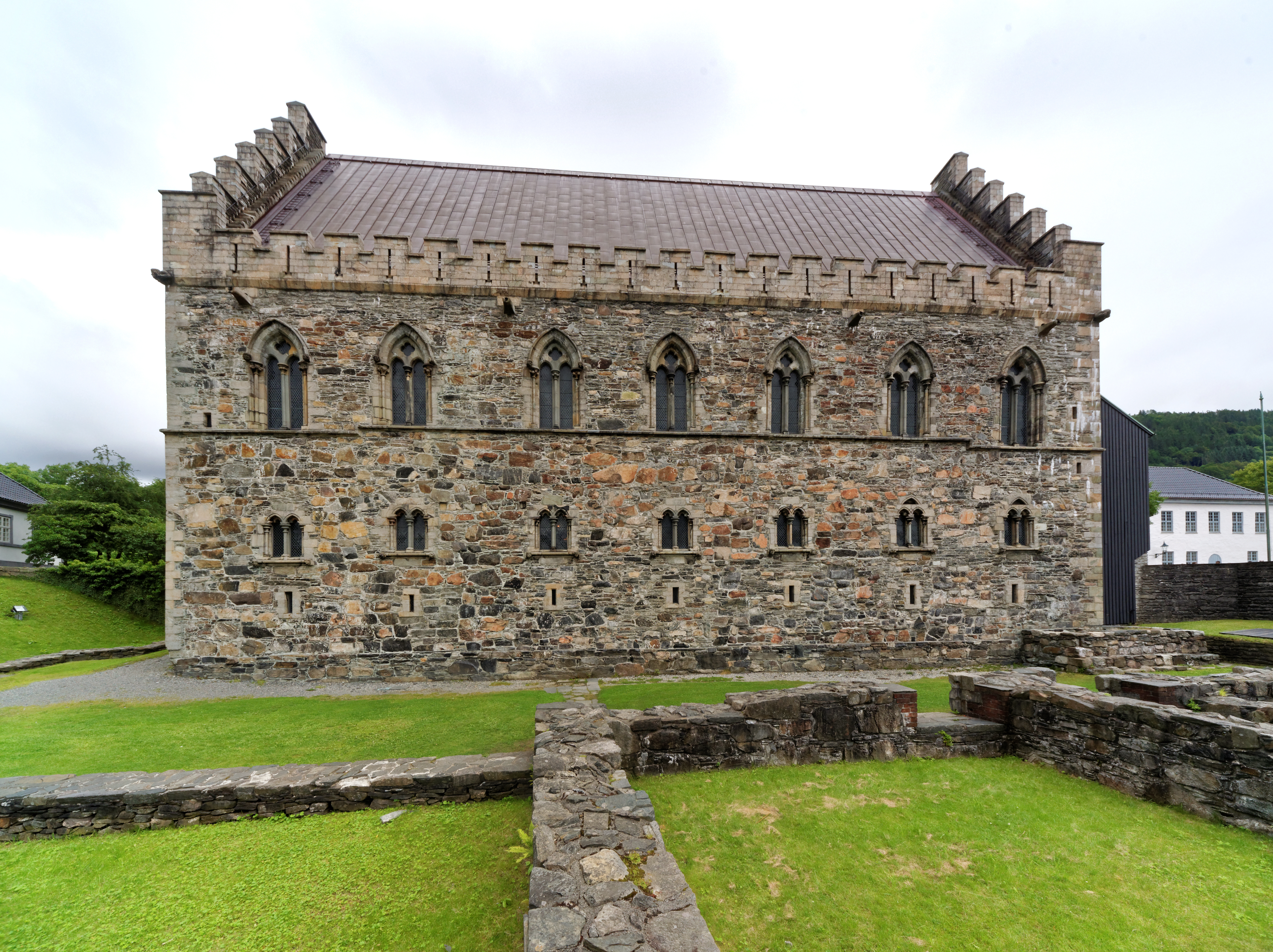
Haakon's Hall

The hall has been hit by several fires, the first one as early as 1266. Upon the death of King Eirik Magnusson in 1299, Bergen lost its status as the main royal residence. From 1380 until 1814, Norway was in a personal union with Denmark, which meant that the royal castle in Bergen gradually fell into decay. In 1429 it was captured and burnt by the Victual Brothers (viktualiebrødrene), but a new stone portal from the mid-15th century shows that the hall was rebuilt after this event. Soon after, however, as the old royal residence was transformed into a purely military fortress, the Hall was turned into a storage building.

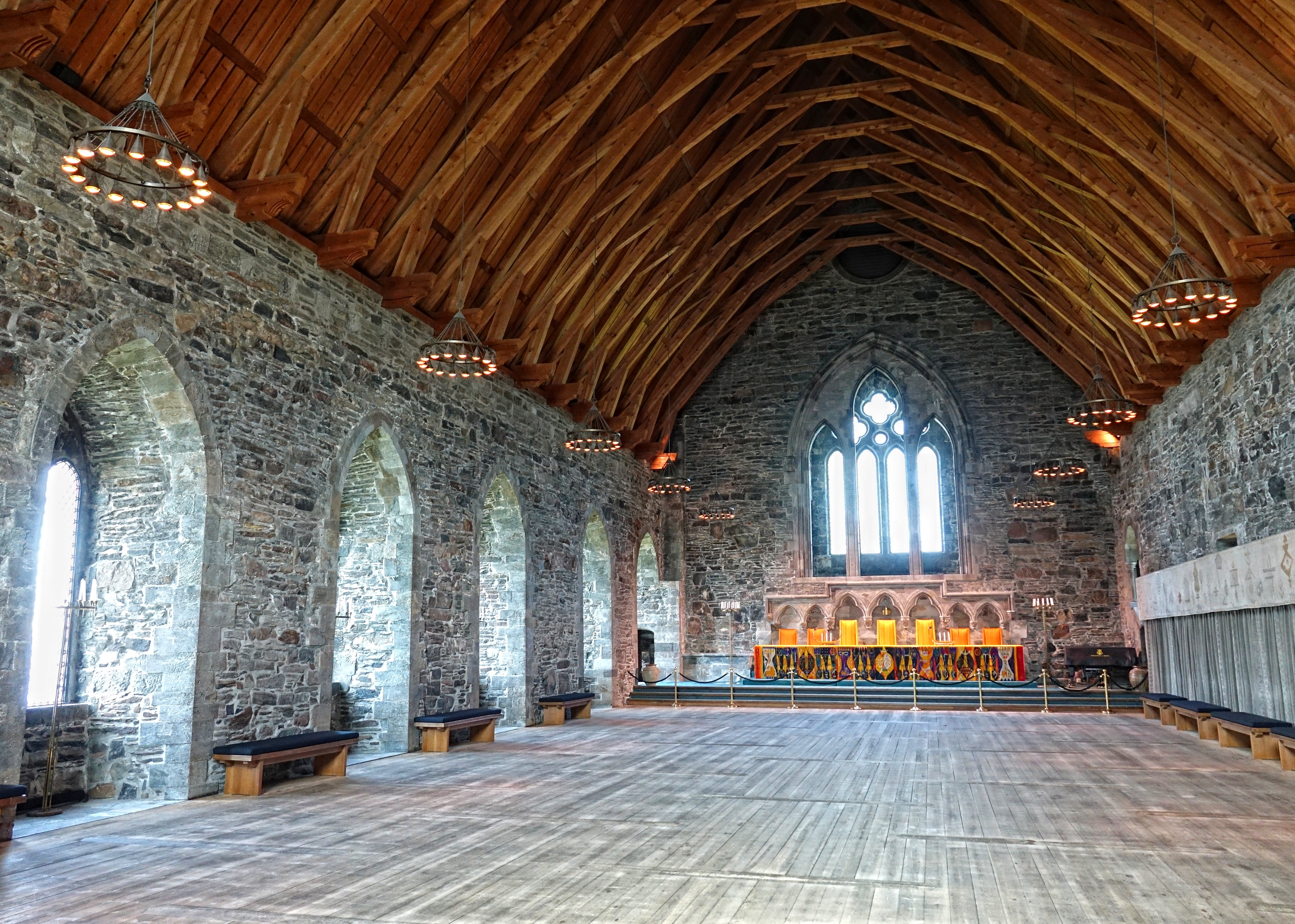
Interior of Haakon's Hall

By the 18th century, its original function had been largely forgotten. However, the 19th century saw the rise of Norwegian romantic nationalism as the country gradually regained its independence. As a result, the independent medieval kingdom was used as a source of new national symbols to rally around. In 1840, it was proven that the great stone building in Bergenhus fortress was, in fact, King Håkon Håkonsson's old feast hall. For the next half century, its restoration back to its original function was debated. Henrik Ibsen wrote a poem in the hall's honor, and poet Henrik Wergeland first used the name Haakons hall in one of his poems. The hall was finally restored in the 1890s, and in the 1910s it was decorated with frescos with motives from Håkon Håkonsson's saga, and stained glass windows.

The hall was severely damaged on 20 April 1944, when the wooden roof caught fire and burnt up. The fire also destroyed all the decorations from the first restoration. A second restoration took place in the 1950s, and the hall was reopened on 11 September 1961, the 700th anniversary of its first use. It is now decorated more discreetly, primarily with tapestries. Haakon's Hall is now administered by the Bergen City Museum, which also takes care of Rosenkrantz Tower and other protected buildings in the city. The hall is occasionally used for concerts, especially choir song and chamber music, and for banquets, mainly for official functions.

=== Rosenkrantz Tower ===
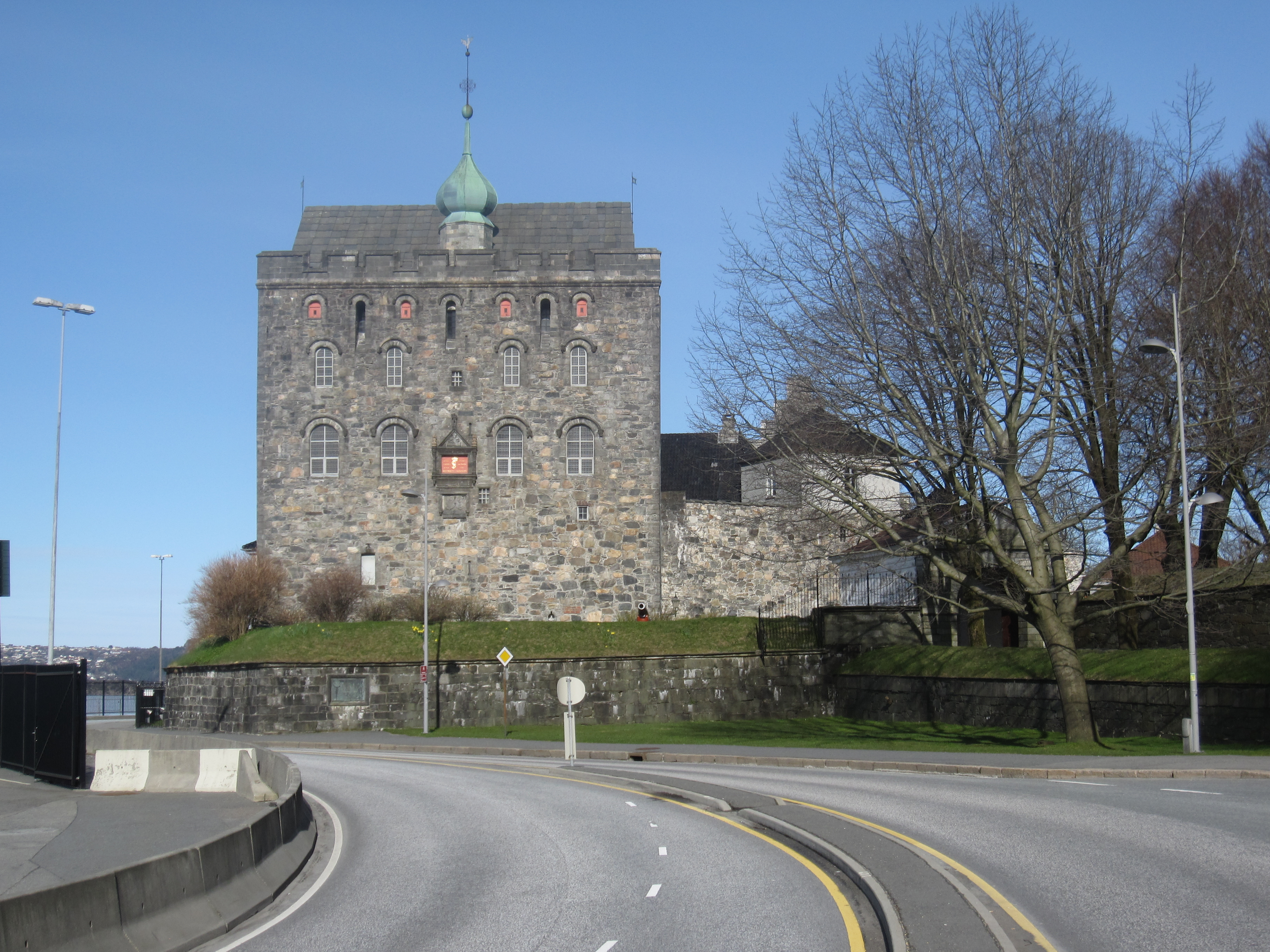
Rosenkrantz Tower

Rosenkrantz Tower (Norwegian: Rosenkrantztårnet) is a tower that derives its name from governor Erik Rosenkrantz (1519-1575) who was governor of Bergenhus Fortress from 1560 to 1568. During his administration, the tower received its present shape and structure. The oldest part of the building is made up of a medieval tower built during the reign of King Magnus the Lawmender in the 1270s as part of the royal castle in Bergen.

The keep was slightly modified ca. 1520, then extensively modified and expanded in the 1560s by Scottish stonemasons and architects in the service of Erik Rosenkrantz to attain its present form. Rosenkrantz' building contained dungeons on the ground floor, residential rooms for the governor higher up, and positions for cannons on the top floor. In the 1740s, the tower was converted to a magazine for gunpowder, a function it served until the 1930s. The whole building has been open to the general public since 1966. Today, the tower serves primarily as a tourist attraction.

== Other sources ==
- Kavli, Guthorm. Norges festninger, fra Fredriksten til Vardøhus (Universitetsforlaget. 1987) ISBN 8200184307
- Knut Helle and Ole Egil Eide. Holmen - Bergenhus, The Royal and Ecclesiastical Centre of Bergen in the Middle Ages (Alveheim & Eide. 1985) ISBN 8290359268
