= Nairn Castle =

Coordinates: 57°35′N 3°52′W

Nairn Castle was a castle that was located in Nairn, Scotland. Nairn, then known as Invernairn, was made a royal burgh by King Alexander I of Scotland. The site of the castle is still being debated and it is unclear as to whether any aboveground remains exist.
