= Gartnait, Earl of Mar =

Scottish noble

Gartnait of Mar, Earl of Mar – Gartnait mac Domhnall, 8th Mormaer (or Earl) of Mar, was a Scottish noble during the first War of Scottish Independence (1296–1328). His name is sometimes rendered as Gartney or Gratney. A son of Domhnall I, Earl of Mar, and his wife, Elen ferch Llywelyn, Gartnait of Mar died in about 1305.

== Support for Edward I, King of England ==
During the Scottish war against King Edward I of England, Andrew Moray, son of Sir Andrew Moray of Petty, took action in the Highlands in 1297, besieging Urquhart Castle near Inverness, which was under the control of the English constable, Sir William FitzWarin. Moray failed in this attempt but moved on to Moray and Aberdeenshire. In response, Edward sent three Scottish nobles deemed favorable to him at the time to quell this rebellion—Henry le Chen, Bishop of Aberdeen; John Comyn, Earl of Buchan; and Gartnait of Mar, whose father had just been released from the Tower of London and was under oath to support King Edward.

These three, along with Euphemia, Countess of Ross, engaged Moray near the River Spey on 17 July but, instead of apprehending him, allowed him to withdraw without pursuit. To explain themselves, they sent a letter to King Edward on 25 July, saying they had encountered "Andrew de Moray with a great body of rogues. . . and the aforesaid rogues betook themselves into a very great stronghold of bog and wood where no horseman could be of service". To provide the king with details, the three sent Andrew de Rait with a letter of credence. Along the way, Rait met with Hugh de Cressingham, treasurer of the English administration in Scotland, and showed him the letter. Cressingham, however, seems not to have placed much confidence in the veracity of the letter and, on 5 August, told Edward "to give little weight to it, for it is false in many points and obscure, as will be well known hereafter, I fear". Cressingham had the right of it, as Moray joined forces with Sir William Wallace and continued the struggle against the English king.

== Earldom ==
Gartnait's father, the 7th earl of Mar, died at Kildrummy Castle on 25 July 1297, the same day on which Chen's letter to Edward was composed. The exact date on which Gartnait succeeded his father as earl of Mar is unknown, but it has been argued that this may have occurred soon after Gartnait's mission in the north against Moray. There is no surviving document mentioning Gartnait as earl of Mar during his lifetime, but writs composed after his death refer to him thus.

== Family ==
Though the wife of Gartnait of Mar has historically been identified as Christina Bruce, sister of Robert the Bruce, it is now argued that Mar married not Christina, but an elder sister of Robert.

Mar and his wife were the parents of three children:

- Margaret of Mar (1270–1326), who married Malise Stewart
- Helen of Mar, who married, first, Sir John Menteith, Lord of Arran, and, secondly, Sir James Garioch
- Domhnhall, 9th Earl of Mar (d. 12 August 1332)

== Death ==
The date of the death of Gartnait, earl of Mar, is not certain. However, since Robert the Bruce as earl of Carrick was holding Kildrummy Castle in 1305, it has been suggested that Mar died before then and that Carrick was, at that time, the guardian of his nephew, the Earl's heir.

== Notes ==
Preceded by Domhnall I	Mormaer of Mar; 1301–1305	Succeeded by Domhnall II
