= Margaret of Scotland, Queen of Norway =

Queen of Norway from 1281 to 1283

Margaret of Scotland

Queen consort of Norway
- Tenure: 1281 – 9 April 1283
- Coronation: 1281
- Born: 28 February 1261; Windsor Castle, Windsor, Berkshire, England
- Died: 9 April 1283 (aged 22); Tønsberg, Norway
- Burial: Old Cathedral, Bergen
- Spouse: Eric II of Norway
- Issue: Margaret, Maid of Norway
- House: Dunkeld
- Father: Alexander III of Scotland
- Mother: Margaret of England

Margaret of Scotland (Old Norse: Margrét Alexandersdóttir; Norwegian: Margrete Alexandersdotter; Scottish Gaelic: Maighread Nic Rìgh Alasdair; 28 February 1261 – 9 April 1283) was Queen of Norway as the wife of King Eric II. She is sometimes known as the Maid of Scotland to distinguish her from her daughter, Margaret, Maid of Norway, who succeeded to the throne of Scotland.

== Early life ==
Margaret was born on 28 February 1261 at Windsor Castle. She was the firstborn child of King Alexander III of Scotland and Margaret of England, Alexander's first wife. A committee of five earls, four bishops, and four barons were tasked with ensuring that the King's firstborn child was brought safely to Scotland. She was followed by two brothers, Alexander and David. Queen Margaret (of England) died in 1275, but letters written by the younger Margaret point to an affectionate relationship with her uncle King Edward I of England.

== Queen of Norway ==
Margaret stayed unmarried until the age of 20, which was remarkably long for a medieval princess. She was finally betrothed to Eric II, King of Norway, in 1281. The intent was to ease the tensions that developed between Norway and Scotland in the previous decades. According to chroniclers, Margaret was against the match, but her father insisted. The Scottish crown gave her and Eric the estates of Rothiemay in Banffshire, Belhelvie in Aberdeenshire, Bathgate in West Lothian, and Ratho in Midlothian as her dowry. The treaty arranging the marriage specified, that Margaret and her children would succeed to the throne of Scotland if King Alexander died leaving no legitimate sons and if no legitimate son of his left legitimate children.

Margaret sailed into the port of Bergen in the early morning of 15 August 1281. Her marriage to the 13-year-old king of Norway was celebrated two or three weeks later, making her queen of Norway. She was crowned by Jon Raude, Archbishop of Nidaros, Christ Church, Bergen. A cultured woman, Margaret probably found it difficult to adapt to married life with an uncultured adolescent. Scots reported that she tried to "cultivate" Eric by teaching him French and English, table manners, and fashion. Her mother-in-law, Ingeborg of Denmark, undermined her position as queen and dominated the court.

Between March and 9 April 1283, Queen Margaret gave birth to her only child, Margaret, known as the Maid of Norway, in Tønsberg. She died during or shortly after childbirth, and was buried in Christ Church in Bergen. As Margaret's brothers both predeceased her father, her daughter succeeded to the Scottish throne in 1286.

== Sources ==
- Barrow, G. W. S. (1990). "A Kingdom in Crisis: Scotland and the Maid of Norway". The Scottish Historical Review. 69. Edinburgh University Press: 120–141.
- Duncan, Archibald Alexander McBeth (2002). The Kingship of the Scots, 842-1292: Succession and Independence. Edinburgh University Press. ISBN 0748616268.
- Helle, Knut (1990). "Norwegian Foreign Policy and the Maid of Norway". The Scottish Historical Review. 69. Edinburgh University Press: 142–156.
- Oram, Richard (2002). The Canmores: Kings & Queens of the Scots, 1040-1290. Tempus. ISBN 0752423258.
- Prestwich, Michael (1988). Edward I. University of California Press. ISBN 0520062663.

Margaret of Scotland, Queen of Norway House of Dunkeld Born: 28 February 1261 Died: 9 April 1283
Norwegian royalty
Preceded by Ingeborg of Denmark	Queen consort of Norway; 1281–1283	Succeeded by Isabel Bruce
