= Michael Prestwich =

20th and 21st-century British historian of the Middle Ages

Michael Prestwich OBE
- Born: 30 January 1943 (age 83); Oxford, England

Academic background
- Education: Magdalen College, Oxford (MA); Christ Church, Oxford (DPhil)

Academic work
- Era: Middle Ages
- Discipline: History
- Sub-discipline: Medieval History
- Institutions: Christ Church, Oxford; University of St Andrews; University of Durham
- Main interests: Edward I; Medieval warfare; Edwardian Medievalism
- Notable works: Plantagenet England, 1225-1360 (2005)
- Website: www.durham.ac.uk/staff/m-c-prestwich/

Michael Charles Prestwich (born 30 January 1943) is an English historian and academic, specialising on the history of medieval England, in particular the reign of Edward I. He is Professor Emeritus of Medieval History at Durham University and was head of the Department of History until 2007.

== Early life and education ==
Prestwich is the son of two Oxford historians, John Prestwich and his wife Menna Roberts. His father, "the redoubtable mediaevalist ... who knew so much and published so little", had worked at Bletchley Park during the war, among other things on the breaking of U-boat codes.

Prestwich was educated at the Dragon School in Oxford, and then at Charterhouse School. He studied history at Magdalen College, Oxford, graduating with a first class honours Bachelor of Arts (BA) degree in 1964; as per tradition, his BA was promoted to a Master of Arts (MA Oxon) degree. He was awarded a senior scholarship by Christ Church, Oxford, and remained at Oxford to undertake a Doctor of Philosophy (DPhil) degree under the supervision of George Holmes. He completed this in 1968 with a thesis entitled Edward I's wars and their financing 1294-1307.

== Academic career ==
After completing his doctorate, Prestwich remained at Christ Church, Oxford as a research lecturer to fill in for someone on a sabbatical. The following year, in 1969, he moved to the University of St Andrews where he had been appointed a lecturer in medieval history. He stayed for ten years before moving to Durham University as a reader in its Department of History. In 1986, he was appointed Professor of Medieval History. He also served as head of the department for two spells. For seven years in the 1990s he was pro vice-chancellor, with a wide brief which even extended to health and safety. He was chairman of the trustees of the Durham Union Society until 2013. He twice chaired the History panel for the Research Assessment Exercise, in 1996 and 2001.

Prestwich has provided support and encouragement to other historians, in particular Ann Hyland, who recognised his assistance in her work on medieval warhorses. Prestwich wrote the foreword for both of her books on the subject. On his retirement, he was presented with a festschrift, War, Government and Aristocracy in the British Isles c.1150-1500, edited by Chris Given-Wilson, Ann Kettle and Len Scales.

Prestwich was appointed OBE in the 2010 New Year Honours.

=== Biography of Edward I ===
Prestwich's 1988 biography of Edward I received much praise for being a thorough and professional work, the first biography of Edward for twenty years. According to historian JH Denton, its scope could leave the reader "breathless" while the analysis was often "brilliantly incisive". Fred Cazel's view of Edward was close to that of Prestwich, agreeing with his approach of judging Edward according to contemporaneous standards. Several reviewers noted that the book's strengths included administrative and financial aspects of Edward's rule, its command of the sources, and Prestwich's attempt at balance including presenting different sides of controversial topics discussed. Several reviewers felt that there was not enough discussion of the social condition of England. Another area of criticism was that Edward I was sometimes let off the hook for his bad decisions. Denton highlighted his invasion of Scotland as a poor decision, and felt that the book gave too even an impression of the quality of his reign. GWS Barrow felt that some important topics, including Edward's De donis and Quia emptores laws, along with Anglo-Welsh and Welsh law, were dealt with too quickly. While Scottish aspects were generally covered well, Prestwich was in his view too lenient, not fully recognising Edward's opportunism and ability to ignore previously stated promises. The determination of Scottish resistance was also in his view underestimated. It was also criticised for devoting little space to the approach of Edward to Jewish issues, devoting less than three out of 567 pages to the topic, despite what reviewer Colin Richmond describes as Edward's "pioneering antisemitism".

== Personal life ==
Prestwich is married to fellow Oxford-educated historian Maggie Prestwich, who recently retired as Senior Tutor at Trevelyan College, Durham. He lives in Western Hill in Durham, and has a dog and three grown-up children. He retired in 2008.

== Select publications ==
- War, Politics and Finance under Edward I (1972), ISBN 0-571-09042-7
- The Three Edwards: War and State in England, 1272-1377 (1980), ISBN 0-312-80251-X
- Edward I (1988), ISBN 0-413-28150-7
- English Politics in the Thirteenth Century (1990), ISBN 0-333-41434-9
- Armies and Warfare in the Middle Ages: the English Experience (1996), ISBN 0-300-06452-7
- Plantagenet England, 1225-1360 (2005), ISBN 0-19-822844-9
- Knight (2010), ISBN 978-0-500-25160-7

=== Contributions ===
- Editor of a collection of his father's essays:

J.O. Prestwich, The Place of War in English History, 1066-1214 (2004) Woodbridge: Boydell Press ISBN 1-84383-098-1

- Edward Mirzoeff (2015) The sea of peril. The Oldie 322, June 2015, p. 30.

== Notes ==
=== Sources ===
- Barrow, G. W. S. (1989). "Edward I by Michael Prestwich". The Scottish Historical Review. 68 (186): 205–08. JSTOR 25530422.
- Cazel, Fred A. Jr. (1991). "Edward I. Michael Prestwich". Speculum. 66 (1): 225–227. doi:10.2307/2864011. JSTOR 2864011.
- Denton, J. H. (1989). "Edward I Michael Prestwich". The English Historical Review. 104 (413). Oxford University Press: 981–984. doi:10.1093/ehr/CIV.413.981. JSTOR 572793.
- Lyon, Bryce (1989). "Edward I by Michael Prestwich". Albion: A Quarterly Journal Concerned with British Studies. 21 (2). The North American Conference on British Studies: 288–290. doi:10.2307/4049934. JSTOR 4049934.
- Richmond, Colin (1992). "Englishness and Medieval Anglo-Jewry". In Kushner, Tony (ed.). The Jewish Heritage in British History. Frank Cass. p. 45. ISBN 0-7146-3464-6.
- Stacey, Robert C. (1990). "Review of 'Edward I', by Michael Prestwich". The Historian. 52 (2): 307.
