= Margaret, Maid of Norway =

Queen-designate of Scotland from 1286 to 1290

Margaret

Queen-designate of Scotland
- Reign: 1286 – 1290
- Predecessor: Alexander III
- Successor: John (1292)
- Born: Between March and 9 April 1283; Tønsberg, Norway
- Died: Between 26 and 29 September 1290 (aged 7); Orkney Islands, Norway
- Burial: Christ Church, Bergen
- House: Sverre
- Father: Eric II of Norway
- Mother: Margaret of Scotland

Margaret (Norwegian: Margrete, Scottish Gaelic: Maighread; March or April 1283 – 26/29 September 1290), known as the Maid of Norway, was the queen-designate of Scotland from 1286 until her death. As she was never inaugurated, her status as monarch is uncertain and has been debated by historians.

Margaret was the daughter of King Eric II of Norway and Margaret of Scotland. By the end of the reign of her maternal grandfather, King Alexander III of Scotland, she was his only surviving descendant and had been recognized as heir presumptive. When Alexander III died in 1286, and his posthumous child was stillborn, Margaret succeeded to the Scottish crown.

Owing to her young age, she remained in Norway rather than going to Scotland. Her father and the Scottish leaders negotiated her marriage to Edward of Caernarfon, son of King Edward I of England. She was finally sent to Great Britain in September 1290 but died in Orkney, sparking the succession dispute between thirteen competitors for the crown of Scotland.

== Infancy ==
Margaret, Maid of Norway, was the only child of King Eric II of Norway and his first wife, Margaret, daughter of King Alexander III of Scotland. She was born in Tønsberg, a coastal town in southeastern Norway, between March and 9 April 1283, when her mother died, apparently from the complications of childbirth.

Aged fifteen and possessing little royal authority, King Eric did not have much say about his daughter's future. The infant Margaret was instead in the custody of the leading Norwegian magnate, Narve, Bishop of Bergen. Margaret's upbringing in the city of Bergen shows that her future marriage was expected to be important to the kingdom's foreign policy.

The 1281 treaty arranging the marriage of Eric of Norway and Margaret of Scotland specified that the Scottish princess and her children would succeed to the throne of Scotland if King Alexander died leaving no legitimate sons and if no legitimate son of King Alexander left legitimate children. It also stated that the couple's daughters could inherit the Norwegian throne "if it is the custom". The Scottish party seems to have been deceived because the succession law of Norway, codified in 1280, provided only for male succession, meaning that the Maid could not have succeeded to her father's kingdom. (Note: Eric II was survived by one child from his second marriage, a daughter named Ingeborg, but was succeeded by his brother, Haakon V. When Haakon V died, he was succeeded not by his daughter Ingeborg but by her son Magnus VII.)

== Heir presumptive ==
Alexander, brother of Margaret's mother and the last surviving child of the King of Scotland, died on 28 January 1284. The Maid was left as the only living descendant of Alexander III. The King did not wait to discover whether his son's widow, Margaret of Flanders, was pregnant. Already, on 5 February, he had all thirteen earls, twenty-four barons, and three clan chiefs come to Scone and swear to recognize his granddaughter as his successor if he died leaving neither son nor daughter and if no posthumous child was born to his son. By April it had presumably become clear that the young Alexander's widow was not expecting a child and that Margaret was the heir presumptive.

Alexander III's wife, another Margaret, sister of King Edward I of England, had died in 1275, and the oath he exacted strongly implied that he now intended to remarry. When Edward expressed his condolence to Alexander III that month for the death of his son, the latter responded that "much good may come to pass yet through your kinswoman, the daughter of your niece ... who is now our heir", suggesting that the two kings may have already been discussing a suitable marriage for Margaret. Alexander and his magnates may have hoped for an English match.

King Alexander took a new wife, Yolanda of Dreux, on 14 October 1285, hoping to father another child. On the evening of 18 March 1286, he set out, in stormy weather on horseback, against advice, to meet with Queen Yolanda, only to be found dead with a broken neck the next day.

== Lady and queen ==
Following the unexpected death of King Alexander, Scottish magnates gathered to discuss the kingdom's future. They swore to preserve the throne for the right heir and chose six regents, known as guardians of Scotland, to govern the country. Although the succession had been laid out by the time King Alexander III died, Margaret's accession was not yet assured: her step-grandmother, Queen Yolanda, was pregnant and the child was expected to succeed to the throne.

There was a dispute in parliament in April involving Robert Bruce, 5th Lord of Annandale, and John Balliol, Lord of Galloway. Bruce may have opposed the Maid's succession, or the two men may have both claimed to be next in line to the throne after Yolanda's child and Margaret.

Queen Yolanda delivered a stillborn child in November, and within a few months King Eric's most prominent councillor, Bjarne Erlingsson, arrived in Scotland to claim the kingdom for Margaret. Bruce raised a rebellion with his son, Robert, Earl of Carrick, but was defeated in early 1287. The precariousness of the situation made King Eric reluctant to see his three-year-old daughter leave Norway for Scotland.

=== Marriage negotiations ===
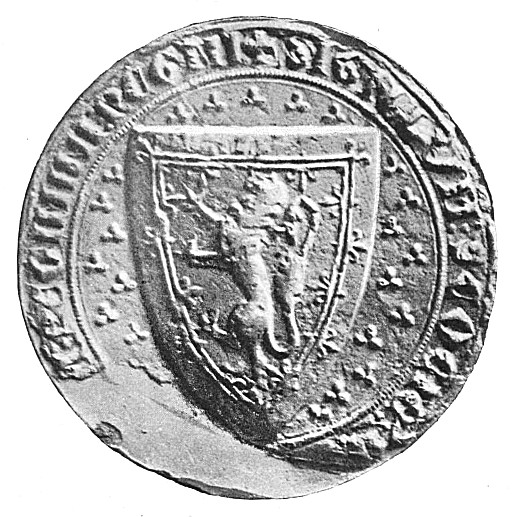
The Great Seal of Scotland used by the government of the realm after the death of King Alexander III

In May 1289, Eric II sent envoys to Edward I as part of the kings' unfolding discussion about the future of Margaret, whom they called "lady and queen". The Scots could only observe the negotiations between the two kings as Margaret was still with her father.

Eric was indebted to Edward, and Edward was determined to make the most of the situation. The guardians, accompanied by Bruce, finally met with English and Norwegian envoys at Salisbury in October. The Treaty of Salisbury was drawn up on 6 November 1289, stating that Eric and Margaret, "queen and heir of the kingdom", asked Edward to intervene on behalf of his grandniece so "that she could ordain and enjoy therein as other kings do in their kingdoms".

Margaret was to be sent, by 1 November 1290, to England directly or via Scotland. Once the Scots could assure Edward that Scotland was peaceful and safe, he would send her to them. Margaret was allowed to choose her husband, though her father retained the right to veto the choice. At Edward's request, a papal dispensation permitting Margaret to marry her granduncle's son, Edward of Caernarfon, was issued on 16 November 1289.

The guardians and other prelates and magnates wrote that they were firmly in favour of the English match for "the lady Margaret queen of Scotland, our lady". It was strongly implied that Margaret's husband would be king, and Edward insisted on referring to Margaret as queen to speed up the accession of his own son, although the Scots themselves normally described her only as their lady.

Negotiations about Margaret's marriage, dower, succession, and the nature of the intended personal union between England and Scotland continued into 1290. A lavishly provisioned ship failed to fetch the Maid in May because of diplomatic difficulties. The Treaty of Birgham, agreed on 18 July, provided that Scotland was to remain fully independent despite the personal union and that Margaret alone would be inaugurated as monarch at Scone.

=== Fatal journey ===
By late August 1290, Margaret was preparing to sail from Bergen to the island of Great Britain or was already at sea. The ship was her father's, but he did not accompany her; the most prominent men in her entourage were Bishop Narve and Baron Tore Håkonsson. She presumably embarked in good health but became ill during her journey. The ship landed in Orkney, a Norwegian archipelago off the coast of Scotland, on about 23 September.

Having suffered on Orkney for up to a week from either food poisoning or, less likely, motion sickness, Margaret died between 26 and 29 September 1290 in the arms of Bishop Narve. The Scottish magnates, who had assembled at Scone for the child queen's inauguration, learned about her death in October. Her body was returned to Bergen, where King Eric insisted on having the coffin opened to confirm his daughter's identity. He then had it buried in the north wall of the chancel of Christ Church, now destroyed.

== Legacy ==
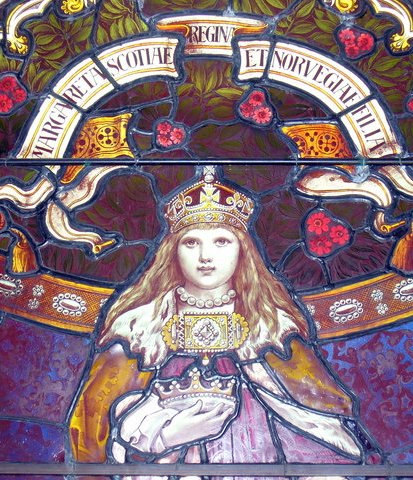
Lerwick Town Hall stained glass window depicting "Margaret, Queen of Scotland and daughter of Norway"

Margaret was the last legitimate scion of the line of King William the Lion. Thirteen men laid claim to succession, most notably Bruce and Balliol. King Eric half-heartedly claimed the Scottish crown as well and died in 1299. In 1301 she was impersonated by a German woman, False Margaret, who was burned at the stake.

Historians debate whether Margaret should be considered a queen and included in the list of Scottish monarchs. She was never inaugurated, and her contemporaries in Scotland described her as queen very rarely, referring to her instead as their "lady". She was usually called Scotland's "lady", "heir", or "lady and heir" and rarely as "queen" during the deliberations of the Great Cause after her death. One of her biographers, Archie Duncan, argues that because she was "never inaugurated, she was never queen of Scots".

Conversely, documents issued from late 1286 no longer refer to the "king whosoever he may be", indicating that Margaret may have already been regarded as queen. Another of her biographers, Norman H. Reid, insists that Margaret was "accepted as queen" by her contemporaries but that, owing to the lack of an inauguration, "[her] reign never started". Pope Nicholas IV considered Margaret to be the monarch of Scotland and treated her as such, sending to her a bull regarding the episcopal election of Matthew de Crambeth. In modern historiography, she is nearly unanimously called "queen", and reference books give 19 March 1286, the date of Alexander III's death, as the start of her reign.

== Family tree ==
Margaret's family ties resulted from the marital diplomacy that sought to ensure peace among the three kingdoms on the North Sea – Norway, Scotland, and England, and placed her at the centre of the Scottish succession intrigues.

Margaret's relationship to the kings of Scotland, Norway, and England

Henry of Scotland
William I of Scotland	David of Scotland
Henry III of England	Alexander II of Scotland	Margaret of Huntingdon	Isobel of Huntingdon
Edward I of England	Margaret of England	Alexander III of Scotland	Yolanda of Dreux	Dervorguilla of Galloway	Robert Bruce
Eric II of Norway	Margaret of Scotland	Alexander of Scotland	Margaret of Flanders	John Balliol
Edward II of England	Margaret, Maid of Norway

== Bibliography ==
- Barrow, Geoffrey Wallis Steuart (1965). Robert Bruce and the Community of the Realm of Scotland. University of California Press.
- Barrow, Geoffrey Wallis Steuart (1990). "A Kingdom in Crisis: Scotland and the Maid of Norway". The Scottish Historical Review. 69: 120–141.
- Duncan, Archibald Alexander McBeth (2002). The Kingship of the Scots, 842–1292: Succession and Independence. Edinburgh University Press. ISBN 0748616268.
- Helle, Knut (1990). "Norwegian Foreign Policy and the Maid of Norway". The Scottish Historical Review. 69: 142–156.
- Oram, Richard (2002). The Canmores: Kings & Queens of the Scots, 1040–1290. Tempus. ISBN 0752423258.
- Prestwich, Michael (1988). Edward I. University of California Press. ISBN 0520062663.
- Reid, Norman (1982). "Margaret, "Maid of Norway" and Scottish Queenship" (PDF). Reading Medieval Studies. 8: 75–96. Archived (PDF) from the original on 11 September 2022.

Margaret, Maid of Norway House of Sverre Born: 9 April 1283 Died: 26 September 1290
Regnal titles
Vacant Title last held by Alexander III	— DISPUTED — Queen of Scotland; 1286–1290	Vacant Title next held by John Balliol
