= Alexander III of Scotland =

King of Alba from 1249 to 1286

Alexander III
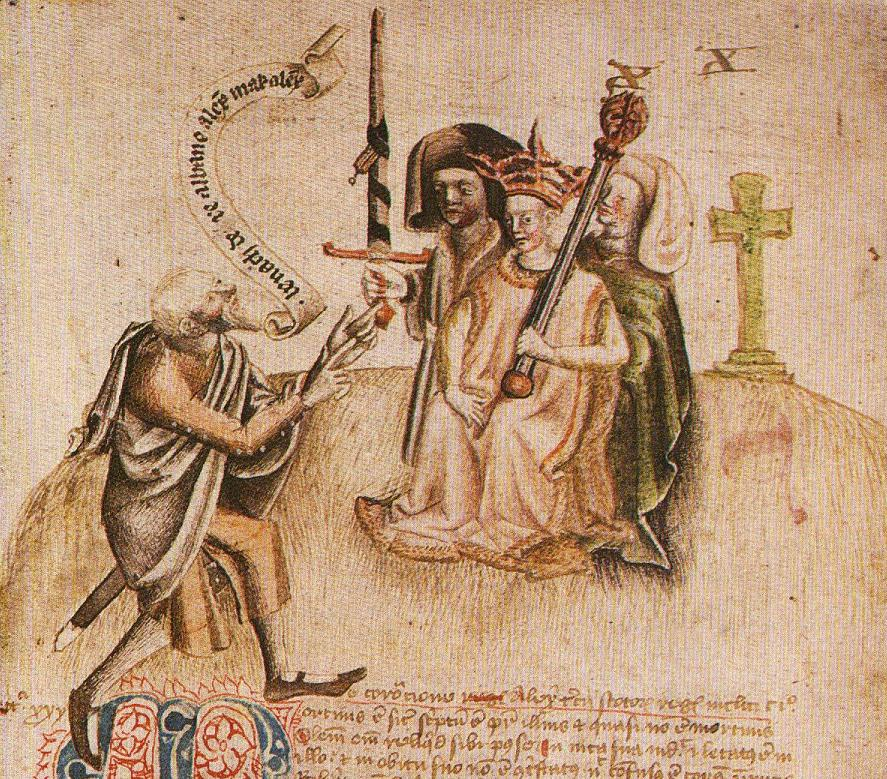
- Coronation of King Alexander on Moot Hill, Scone. He is being greeted by the ollamh rígh, the royal poet, who is addressing him with the proclamation "Benach De Re Albanne" (= Beannachd Dé Rígh Alban, "God Bless the King of Scotland"); the poet goes on to recite Alexander's genealogy. By Alexander's side is Maol Choluim II, Earl of Fife, holding the sword.

King of Alba (Scotland)
- Reign: 6 July 1249 – 19 March 1286
- Inauguration: 13 July 1249
- Predecessor: Alexander II
- Successor: Margaret
- Born: 4 September 1241; Roxburgh Castle, Roxburghshire, Scotland
- Died: 19 March 1286 (aged 44); Kinghorn Ness, Fife, Scotland
- Burial: 29 March 1286; Dunfermline Abbey
- Spouses: Margaret of England (m. 1251; died 1275) Yolande de Dreux (m. 1285)
- Issue more...: Margaret, Queen of Norway; Alexander, Prince of Scotland; David
- House: Dunkeld
- Father: Alexander II
- Mother: Marie de Coucy

Alexander III (Scottish Gaelic: Alaxandair mac Alaxandair; Modern Gaelic: Alasdair mac Alasdair; 4 September 1241 – 19 March 1286) was King of Alba (Scotland) from 6 July 1249 until his death. He concluded the Treaty of Perth, by which Scotland acquired sovereignty over the Western Isles and the Isle of Man. His heir and only grandchild, Margaret, Maid of Norway, died before she could be crowned.

== Life ==
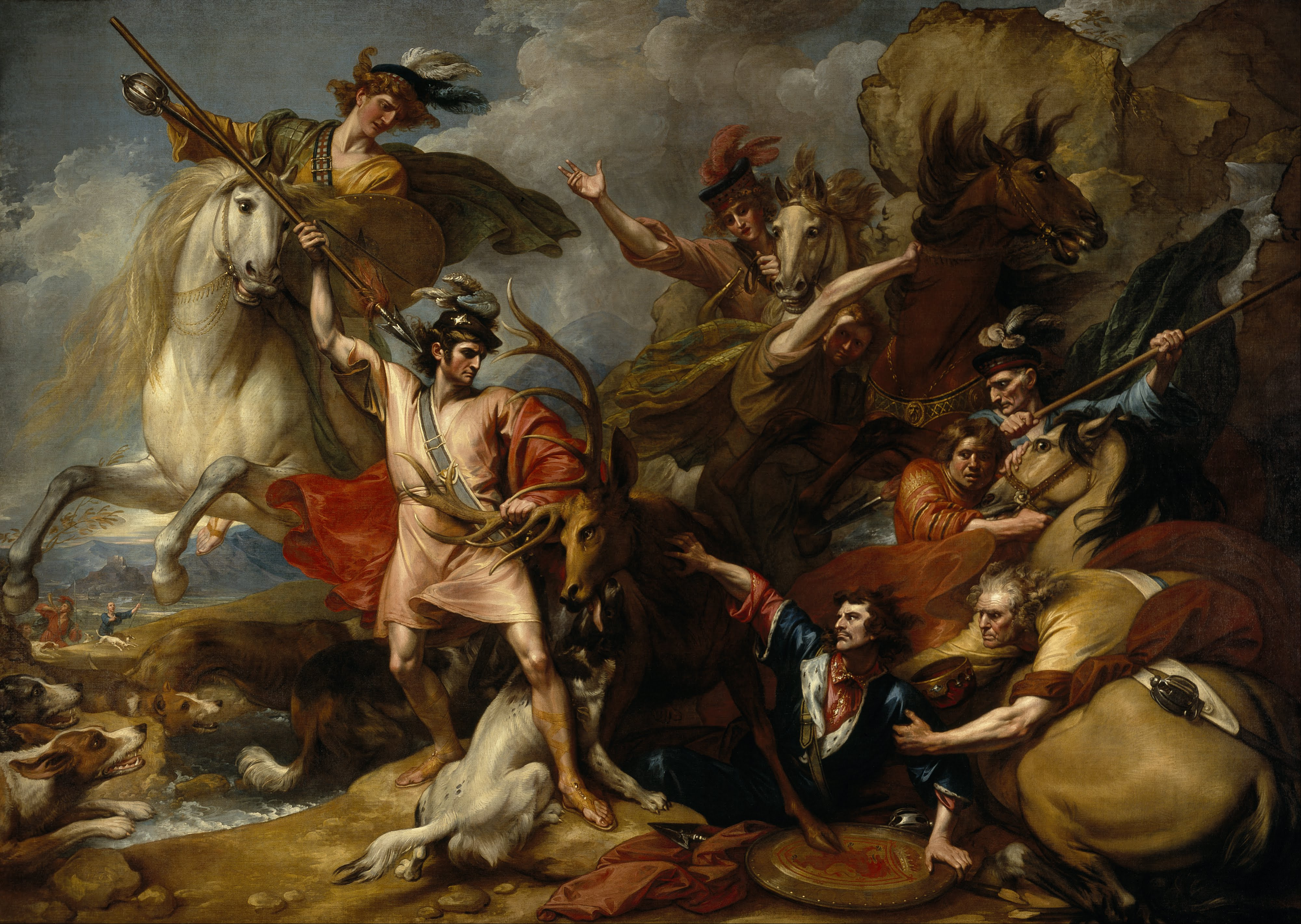
Alexander III of Scotland Rescued from the Fury of a Stag by Benjamin West, 1786

Alexander was born at Roxburgh, the only son of Alexander II by his second wife, Marie de Coucy. His father died on 6 July 1249, and he became king at the age of seven, inaugurated at Scone on 13 July 1249.

The years of his minority featured an embittered struggle for the control of affairs between two rival parties, the one led by Walter Comyn, Earl of Menteith, the other by Alan Durward, Justiciar of Scotia. The former dominated the early years of Alexander's reign. At the marriage of Alexander to Margaret of England in 1251, Henry III of England seized the opportunity to demand homage from his son-in-law for the Scottish kingdom, but Alexander did not comply. In 1255, an interview between the English and Scottish kings at Kelso led to Menteith and his party losing to Durward's party. Though disgraced, they still retained great influence, and two years later, seizing the person of the King, they compelled their rivals to consent to the establishment of a regency representative of both parties.

On attaining his majority at the age of 21 in 1262, Alexander declared his intention to resume the projects on the Western Isles which the death of his father thirteen years before had cut short. He laid a formal claim before King Haakon IV. Haakon rejected the claim, and in the following year, responded with a formidable invasion. Sailing around the west coast of Scotland, he halted off the Isle of Arran, and negotiations commenced. Alexander artfully prolonged the talks until the autumn storms began. At length Haakon, weary of delay, attacked, only to encounter a terrific storm which greatly damaged his ships. The Battle of Largs on 2 October 1263 proved indecisive, but even so, Haakon's position was hopeless. Baffled, he turned homewards, but died in Orkney on 15 December 1263. The Isles now lay at Alexander's feet, and in 1266 Haakon's successor, his son Magnus the Lawmender, concluded the Treaty of Perth, by which he ceded the Isle of Man and the Western Isles to Scotland in return for monetary payments. Norway retained Orkney and Shetland until 1469, when they became a dowry for James III's bride, Margaret of Denmark.

== Marriages and issue ==
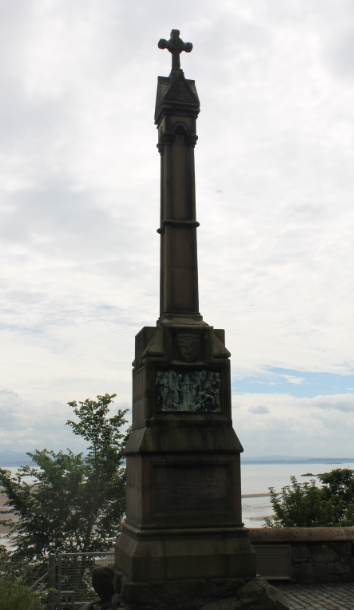
Monument to Alexander III, west of Kinghorn, by Hippolyte Blanc

Alexander had married Margaret of England, daughter of King Henry III of England and Eleanor of Provence, on 26 December 1251, when he was ten years old and she was eleven. She died in 1275, after they had had three children:

1. Margaret (28 February 1261 – 9 April 1283), who married King Eric II of Norway;
2. Alexander, Prince of Scotland (21 January 1264 Jedburgh – 28 January 1284 Lindores Abbey), buried in Dunfermline Abbey;
3. David (20 March 1272 – June 1281 Stirling Castle), buried in Dunfermline Abbey.

According to the Lanercost Chronicle, Alexander did not spend his decade as a widower alone: "he used never to forbear on account of season nor storm, nor for perils of flood or rocky cliffs, but would visit none too creditably nuns or matrons, virgins or widows as the fancy seized him, sometimes in disguise."

Towards the end of Alexander's reign, the death of all three of his children within a few years made the question of the succession one of pressing importance. In 1284, he induced the Estates to recognise as his heir presumptive his granddaughter, Margaret, Maid of Norway. The need for a male heir led him to contract a second marriage to Yolande of Dreux on 1 November 1285.

== Death ==
Alexander died in a fall from his horse while riding in the dark to visit the Queen at Kinghorn in Fife on 19 March 1286 because it was her birthday the next day. He had spent the evening at Edinburgh Castle celebrating his second marriage and overseeing a meeting with royal advisers. He was cautioned against making the journey to Fife because of weather conditions but crossed the River Forth from Dalmeny to Inverkeithing anyway. On arriving in Inverkeithing, he insisted on not stopping for the night, despite the pleas of the nobles accompanying him and one of the burgesses of the town, Alexander Le Saucier. Le Saucier (who was either linked to the King's kitchen or the master of the local saltpans) must have been known to the King, since his rather blunt warning to the King lacks the usual deference: "My lord, what are you doing out in such weather and darkness? How many times have I tried to persuade you that midnight travelling will do you no good?"

However, Alexander ignored the repeated warnings about travelling in a storm and set off with his retinue and two local guides. The king became separated from his party near Kinghorn, and was found dead with a broken neck near the shore the following morning. It is assumed that his horse lost its footing in the dark. While some texts say that he fell off a cliff, there is none at the site where his body was found; however, there is a very steep rocky embankment, which "would have been fatal in the dark." After Alexander's death, his realm was plunged into a period of darkness that would eventually lead to war with England. He was buried in Dunfermline Abbey.

As Alexander left no surviving children, the heir to the throne was his unborn child by Queen Yolande. When Yolande's pregnancy ended, probably with a miscarriage, Alexander's three-year-old granddaughter, Margaret, Maid of Norway, became the heir. Margaret died, still uncrowned, on her way to Scotland in 1290. The inauguration of John Balliol as King on 30 November 1292 ended the six years of the Guardians of Scotland governing the land.

The death of Alexander and the subsequent period of instability in Scotland were lamented in an early Scots-language poem recorded by Andrew of Wyntoun in his Orygynale Cronykil of Scotland:

Quhen Alexander our kynge was dede,

That Scotlande lede in lauche and le,
Away was sons of alle and brede,
Off wyne and wax, of gamyn and gle.
Our golde was changit into lede.
Crist, borne in virgynyte,
Succoure Scotlande, and ramede,

That is stade in perplexite.

Richard Oram has challenged the picture of plenty during the reign of Alexander painted by Wyntoun, pointing out that at that time climatic conditions were deteriorating after the Medieval Climate Anomaly.

In 1886, a monument to Alexander III was erected at the approximate location of his death in Kinghorn.

== Legend ==
Raphael Holinshed, in his oft-fanciful history of England in Holinshed's Chronicles, stated that at Alexander III's wedding to Yolande de Dreux, "a creature resembling death, naked of flesh & lire, with bare bones right dreadfull to behold" appeared at the end of a dance and caused it to be hurriedly concluded. This was, in tradition, an omen of death.

A similar account is given in Walter Bower's Scotichronicon, a figure that "seemed to glide like a ghost rather than walk on feet" supposedly appeared amidst a group performing Scottish sword dances.

== Fictional portrayals ==
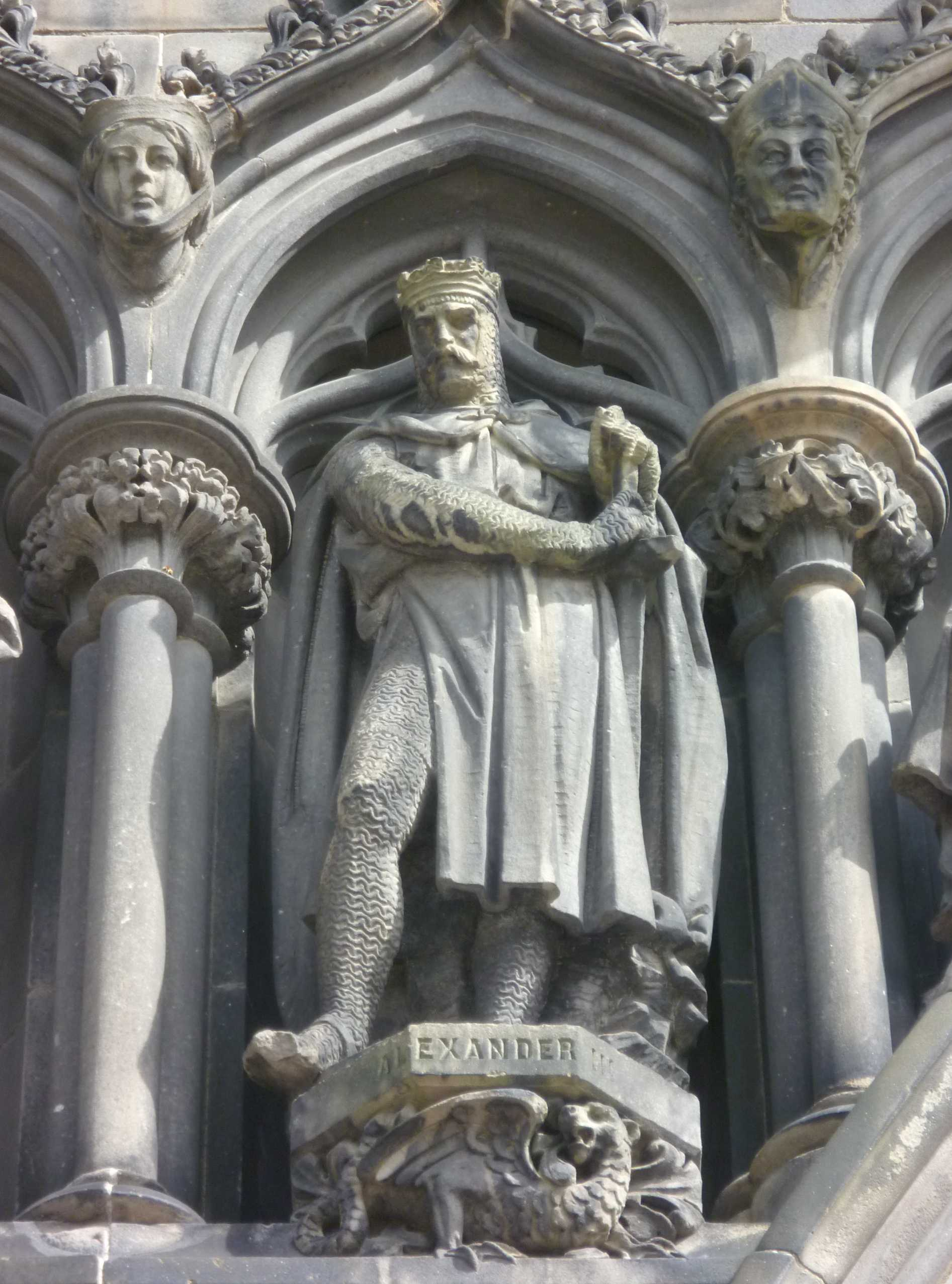
Statue of Alexander on the west door of St Giles' Cathedral, Edinburgh

Alexander III has been depicted in historical novels. They include:

- The Thirsty Sword (1892) by Robert Leighton. The novel depicts the "Norse invasion of Scotland" (1262–1263, part of the Scottish–Norwegian War) and the Battle of Largs. It includes depictions of Alexander III and his opponent Haakon IV of Norway.
- Alexander the Glorious (1965) by Jane Oliver. The novel covers the entire reign of Alexander III (1249–1286), "almost entirely from Alexander's viewpoint".
- The Crown in Darkness (1988) by Paul C. Doherty. A crime fiction novel in which Hugh Corbett investigates the "mysterious death" of Alexander III (1286). Alexander supposedly suffered a fatal fall from his horse. But there are suspicions of murder. The novel concludes that Alexander was indeed murdered "by a fanatical servant" of Edward I of England. The killer acting according to "Edward's secret desire to overwhelm and control Scotland". Doherty suggests that the personal relations of the two kings were strained by constant arguments, though this is not confirmed by historical sources.
- Quest For A Maid (1988) by Frances M Hendry. The novel depicts the life of Meg, her power-hungry older sister Inge, Lady Marjorie, Countess of Carrick, and their part in securing the succession of Lady Marjorie's son Robert the Bruce to the Scottish throne. It includes depictions of Alexander III's death as "falling off a cliff" with sorcery as the cause.
- Insurrection (2010) by Robyn Young. This is the first in a series of novels primarily about the life and times of Robert the Bruce. However, it covers Alexander III and the circumstances surrounding his death in some detail.
- Crusader (1991) by Nigel Tranter. This novel follows the minority of Alexander III and his relationship with David de Lindsay. Tranter, who has written scores of historical novels spanning the range of Scotland's history, also wrote: "Envoy Extraordinary" (1999) (about Patrick Earl of Dunbar) and "True Thomas" (1981) (about Thomas the Rhymer), both of which take place during the reign of Alexander III, and in which Alexander is a featured character.

== Sources ==
- Anderson, Alan Orr (ed.); Early Sources of Scottish History: AD 500–1286, 2 Vols, (Edinburgh, 1922), republished, Marjorie Anderson (ed.); (Stamford, 1991).
- idem (ed.); Scottish Annals from English Chroniclers: AD 500–1286, (London, 1908), republished, Marjorie Anderson (ed.); (Stamford, 1969)
- Ashley, Mike (2002), British Kings & Queens, Carroll & Graf, ISBN 0-7867-1104-3.
- Brown, Michael (2004), The Wars of Scotland 1214–1371, Edinburgh University Press, ISBN 0-7486-1237-8
- Browne, Ray Broadus; Krauser, Lawrence A. (2000), The Detective as Historian: History and Art in historical crime fiction, Vol. 1, Popular Press, ISBN 978-0-87972-815-1
- Campbell, Marion (1999), Alexander III King of Scots, House of Lochar, ISBN 1-899863-55-9
- Duncan, A. A. M. (2016). The Kingship of the Scots, 842–1292: Succession and Independence. Edinburgh University Press.
- Fergusson, James (1937), Alexander the Third King of Scotland, Alexander MacClehose & Co.
- Neville, Cynthia J.; Simpson, Grant G. (2012), Regesta Regum Scottorum, Vol. IV part 1. The Acts of Alexander III, Edinburgh University Press, ISBN 978-0-7486-2732-5.
- Nield, Jonathan (1968), A Guide to the Best Historical Novels and Tales, Ayer Publishing, ISBN 978-0-8337-2509-7
- Reid, Norman H. (1990), Scotland in the Reign of Alexander III 1249–1286, John Donald, ISBN 0-85976-218-1
- Scott, Robert McNair; Robert the Bruce: King of Scots, 1869.

Alexander III of Scotland House of Dunkeld Born: 4 September 1241 Died: 19 March 1286
Regnal titles
Preceded by Alexander II	King of Scots; 1249–1286	Succeeded by Margaret
