= Eric II of Norway =

King of Norway from 1280 to 1299

Eric II Magnusson
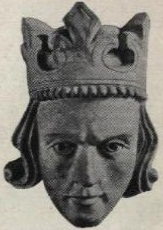
- Contemporary bust from the Stavanger Cathedral, dated to the 1280s.

King of Norway
- Reign: 9 May 1280 – 15 July 1299
- Coronation: 2 July 1280
- Predecessor: Magnus VI
- Successor: Haakon V
- Born: May 1268
- Died: July 15, 1299 (aged 30–31); Bergen, Norway
- Burial: Christ Church, Bergen
- Spouses: Margaret of Scotland (m. 1281; died 1283) Isabel Bruce (m. 1293)
- Issue: Margaret, Maid of Norway; Ingeborg, Duchess of Finland
- House: Sverre
- Father: Magnus VI of Norway
- Mother: Ingeborg of Denmark

Eric Magnusson (May 1268 – 15 July 1299) (Old Norse: Eiríkr Magnússon; Modern Norwegian: Eirik Magnusson) was king of Norway from 1280 until 1299.

== Background ==
Eric was the eldest surviving son of King Magnus VI the Lawmender and Queen Ingeborg of Denmark. In 1273, he was designated king alongside his father, while his younger brother Haakon was given the title of duke.

King Magnus planned to hold a coronation for Eric as subordinate co-ruler in the summer of 1280. However, Magnus died before this could be arranged, and Eric became sole king and was crowned at Bergen in the summer of 1280. During his minority, the kingdom was ruled by a royal council consisting of prominent barons and probably also his mother, Queen Ingeborg. After Eric came of age in 1282, this council is still thought to have exerted major influence over his reign.

Haakon, as duke, ruled a large area around Oslo in eastern Norway and Stavanger in the southwest, subordinate to King Eric. Eric's main residence was in Bergen in western Norway.

== Marriages and issue ==
In 1281, Eric married Margaret of Scotland, daughter of King Alexander III of Scotland. Margaret died two years later in childbirth, giving birth to Margaret, Maid of Norway, who was recognised as heir to the Scottish throne. The young queen died in 1290 while travelling to Scotland, and her death sparked the disputed succession that led to the Wars of Scottish Independence. King Eric briefly and unsuccessfully laid claim to the Scottish crown as his daughter's heir.

Eric's second marriage, in 1293, was to Isabel Bruce, sister of Robert the Bruce. They had a daughter, Ingeborg, who later married Valdemar Magnusson, Duke of Finland.

== Reign ==
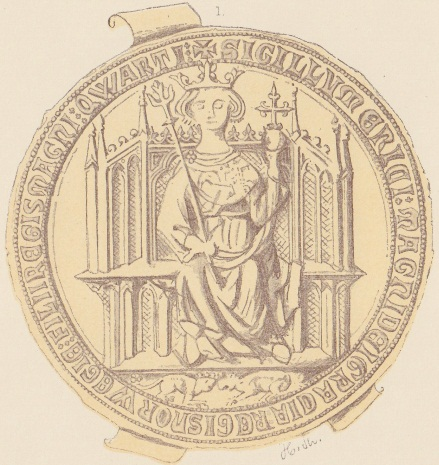
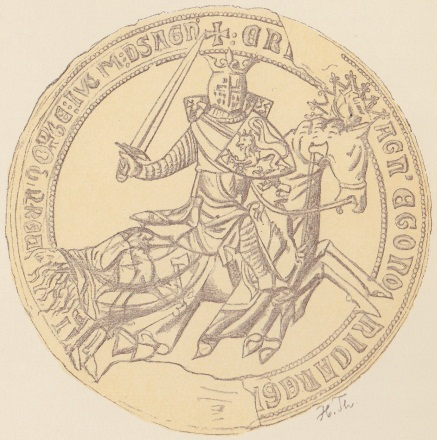
Seal of Eric in known use 1289–98, with obverse (left) and reverse (right).

A major feature of Eric's reign was the War of the Outlaws (De fredløses krig, 1287–1295) against Denmark, partly motivated by his claim to his mother's Danish inheritance. In 1287, he granted sanctuary in Norway to a group of Danish nobles, including Jacob Nielsen, Count of Halland and Stig Andersen Hvide, outlawed for the alleged murder of King Eric V. In 1289, Eric personally led a Norwegian fleet with the exiles, raiding Denmark, burning Elsinore and threatening Copenhagen. Further raids occurred in 1290 and 1293, but these campaigns had limited lasting effect. Peace was concluded in 1295.

Within Norway, the baronial council that governed during his minority continued to wield much of the power, limiting Eric's authority. He also maintained close links with Scotland through dynastic marriages and military ventures.

== Death and succession ==
Eric died in Bergen in 1299 and was buried in the old Christ Church, Bergen. He left no surviving sons, and was succeeded by his brother Haakon. The site of the cathedral is now marked by a memorial stone at Bergenhus Fortress.

Eric II of Norway House of Sverre Cadet branch of the Fairhair dynasty Born: 1268 Died: 15 July 1299
Regnal titles
Preceded by Magnus VI as sole king	King of Norway; 1273–1299 with Magnus VI (1273-1280)	Succeeded by Haakon V
