= G. W. S. Barrow =

English historian and academic (1924–2013)

G. W. S. Barrow FBA FRSE
- Born: 28 November 1924; Leeds, England
- Died: 14 December 2013 (aged 89)
- Education: St Edward's School, Oxford; Inverness Royal Academy; University of St Andrews; Pembroke College, Oxford
- Occupations: Academic, historian, professor

Geoffrey Wallis Steuart Barrow (28 November 1924 – 14 December 2013) was a Scottish historian and academic.

The son of Charles Embleton Barrow and Marjorie née Stuart, Geoffrey Barrow was born on 28 November 1924, at Headingley near Leeds. He attended St Edward's School, Oxford, and Inverness Royal Academy, moving on to the University of St Andrews and Pembroke College, Oxford.

While still a student at the University of St Andrews, Barrow joined the Royal Navy. After basic training he was sent to the Royal Navy Signals School near Petersfield in Hampshire, but he was then offered the chance to go on a Japanese course. He passed an interview in the Admiralty and, as a sub-lieutenant in the Royal Naval Volunteer Reserve, joined the seventh course at the secret Bedford Japanese School run by Captain Oswald Tuck in March 1944 for a six-month course. After completing the course he was sent to the Naval Section at the Government Code and Cypher School, Bletchley Park. He was later sent to H.M.S. Anderson, a naval listening and decoding centre in Colombo, Ceylon (Sri Lanka).

Barrow became lecturer in history at University College London in 1950, remaining there until 1961 when he became professor of medieval history at the University of Newcastle upon Tyne, and then in 1974, professor of Scottish history at the University of St Andrews. He was Sir William Fraser Professor of Scottish History and Palaeography at the University of Edinburgh from 1979 to 1992.

Barrow began his work by studying the nature of feudalism in Anglo-Norman Britain, but moved on to specialize more thoroughly on Scottish feudalism. His work tended to focus on Normanisation in High Medieval Scotland, especially in reference to governmental institutions.

== Personal life ==
Barrow married Heather Elizabeth Lownie in 1951. They had one son and one daughter; his daughter, Julia Barrow, also became an historian and academic.

== Notable publications ==
=== Books ===
- Barrow, G. W. S. (1956). Feudal Britain: The Completion of the Medieval Kingdoms, 1066-1314. London: Edward Arnold. OCLC 21616968.
- —— (1965). Robert Bruce and the Community of the Realm of Scotland (1st ed.). London: Eyre & Spottiswoode. OCLC 5639782.
- —— (1973). The Kingdom of the Scots. London: Edward Arnold. OCLC 788174.
- —— (1980). The Anglo-Norman Era in Scottish History: The Ford Lectures Delivered in the University of Oxford in Hilary Term 1977. Oxford: Oxford University Press. OCLC 123133886.
- —— (1981). Kingship and Unity: Scotland, 1000–1306. The New History of Scotland 2. Edinburgh: Edinburgh University Press. OCLC 803443558.
- —— (1992). Scotland and Its Neighbours in the Middle Ages (1st hardcover ed.). London: Bloomsbury Academic. ISBN 9781852850524. OCLC 7390672897.

=== Works as editor ===
- Acts of Malcolm IV, 1153–1165 (Edinburgh, 1960) – Regesta Regum Scottorum, vol. i.
- Acts of William I, 1165–1214 (with W. W. Scott; Edinburgh, 1971) – Regesta Regum Scottorum, vol. ii.
- The Scottish Tradition (Edinburgh, 1974)
- The Charters of King David I (Woodbridge, 1999)

=== Papers ===
- Barrow, G. W. S. (1955). "Earls of Fife in the 12th Century". Proceedings of the Society of Antiquaries of Scotland. 87: 51–62. doi:10.9750/PSAS.087.51.62.
- —— (1998). Borchardt; Bunz (eds.). "Religion in Scotland on the Eve of Christianity". Forschungen zur Reichs-, Papst- und Landesgeschichte: 25–32.
