= Erskine baronets of Cambo (first creation, 1666) =

Escutcheon of the Erskine baronets of Cambo

The Erskine baronetcy, of Cambo in the County of Fife, was created in the Baronetage of Nova Scotia on 20 August 1666 for Charles Erskine. He was a younger brother of Alexander Erskine, 3rd Earl of Kellie.

The 2nd Baronet sat as Member of Parliament for Fife. The 8th Baronet succeeded to the earldom of Kellie in 1797. The baronetcy remained a subsidiary title of the earldom until the baronetcy's extinction in 1829, after the deaths of Thomas Erskine, 9th Earl of Kellie and then his brother Methven in 1829. The overlapping Erskine baronets of Cambo (second creation, 1821) was set up in the Baronetage of the United Kingdom.

== Erskine baronets, of Cambo (1666) ==
- Sir Charles Erskine, 1st Baronet (c. 1620–1677), Lord Lyon
- Sir Alexander Erskine, 2nd Baronet (c. 1663–1727), Lord Lyon
- Sir Charles Erskine, 3rd Baronet (died 1753), Bute Pursuivant then Lyon Clerk and Keeper of the Records
- Sir John Erskine, 4th Baronet (died 1754)
- Sir William Erskine, 5th Baronet (died 1780)
- Sir Charles Erskine, 6th Baronet (died 1790)
- Sir William Erskine, 7th Baronet (died 1791)
- Sir Charles Erskine, 8th Baronet (1764–1799)

See Earl of Kellie for further history.

== Relation to the Earls of Mar ==
Family tree of the Earls of Mar

Earls of Mar (1st creation), 1404
Robert Erskine (d. 1452); 13th Earl of Mar, 1st Lord Erskine
Thomas Erskine (d. 1493); 14th Earl of Mar, 2nd Lord Erskine
Alexander Erskine (d. 1509); 15th Earl of Mar, 3rd Lord Erskine	James II (1430–1460); King of Scots
Earl of Mar (4th creation) and Earl of Garioch, 1483	Earl of Mar (3rd creation) and Earl of Garioch, 1459
Robert Erskine (d. 1513); 16th Earl of Mar, 4th Lord Erskine	James III (1451/1452–1488); King of Scots	Alexander Stewart (c. 1454–1485); Duke of Albany, Earl of March, Earl of Mar and Garioch	John Stewart (c. 1456–c. 1479); Earl of Mar and Garioch
Earl of Mar (5th creation) and Earl of Garioch, 1486
John Erskine (1487–1555); 17th Earl of Mar, 5th Lord Erskine	James IV (1473–1513); King of Scots	John Stewart (1479–1503); Earl of Mar and Garioch
Earl of Mar (7th creation), 1565
John Erskine (d. 1572); 18th Earl of Mar (1st creation), 1st Earl of Mar (7th creation), 6th Lord Erskine	Alexander Erskine of Gogar (d. aft. 1592)	Margaret Erskine (1515–1572)	James V (1512–1542); King of Scots
Baron Erskine of Dirletowne (1604), Viscount of Fentoun (1606), Earl of Kellie, Lord Dirletoun, and Viscount of Fentoun (1619)	Earl of Mar and Garioch (6th creation), 1562
John Erskine (1558–1634); 19th Earl of Mar (1st creation), 2nd Earl of Mar (7th creation)	Thomas Erskine (1566–1639); 1st Earl of Kellie, 1st Viscount of Fentoun (1606 & 1619), 1st Baron Erskine of Dirletowne, 1st Lord Dirletoun	James Stewart (c. 1531–1570); Earl of Mar and Garioch, 1st Earl of Moray, 1st Lord Abernethy, 1st Lord Strathdearn
Earldom of Mar and Garioch extinct, 1570
John Erskine (1585–1654); 20th Earl of Mar (1st creation), 3rd Earl of Mar (7th creation)	Alexander Erskine (d. 1633) styled Viscount Fentoun
Baronet Erskine of Cambo, county Fife (Nova Scotia), 1666
John Erskine (d. 1668); 21st Earl of Mar (1st creation), 4th Earl of Mar (7th creation)	Thomas Erskine (1615–1643); 2nd Earl of Kellie, 2nd Viscount of Fentoun (1606 & 1619), 2nd Baron Erskine of Dirletowne, 2nd Lord Dirletoun	Alexander Erskine (c. 1615–1639); 3rd Earl of Kellie, 3rd Viscount of Fentoun (1606 & 1619), 3rd Baron Erskine of Dirletowne, 3rd Lord Dirletoun	Charles Erskine (c. 1620–1677); 1st Baronet Erskine of Cambo
Charles Erskine (1650–1689); 22nd Earl of Mar (1st creation), 5th Earl of Mar (7th creation)	Alexander Erskine (1663–1727); 2nd Baronet Erskine of Cambo
John Erskine (1675–1732); 23rd Earl of Mar (1st creation), 6th Earl of Mar (7th creation)	James Erskine (1679–1754); Lord Grange	Alexander Erskine (1677–1710); 4th Earl of Kellie, 4th Viscount of Fentoun (1606 & 1619), 4th Baron Erskine of Dirletowne, 4th Lord Dirletoun	Charles Erskine (1687–1753); 3rd Baronet Erskine of Cambo	John Erskine (1690–1754); 4th Baronet Erskine of Cambo	David Erskine (c. 1695–1769)	William Erskine (1695–1781); 5th Baronet Erskine of Cambo
Mar Earldom attainted, 1716
Thomas Erskine (1705–1766) styled Lord Erskine	Lady Frances Erskine (d. 1776)	James Erskine (d. 1785)	Alexander Erskine (d. 1756); 5th Earl of Kellie, 5th Viscount of Fentoun (1606 & 1619), 5th Baron Erskine of Dirletowne, 5th Lord Dirletoun
Mar Earldom attainder lifted by Act of Parliament, 1824
John Francis Erskine (1741–1825); 24th Earl of Mar (1st creation), 7th Earl of Mar (7th creation)	Thomas Alexander Erskine (1732–1781); 6th Earl of Kellie, 6th Viscount of Fentoun (1606 & 1619), 6th Baron Erskine of Dirletowne, 6th Lord Dirletoun	Archibald Erskine (1736–1797); 7th Earl of Kellie, 7th Viscount of Fentoun (1606 & 1619), 7th Baron Erskine of Dirletowne, 7th Lord Dirletoun	Charles Erskine (1730–1790); 6th Baronet Erskine of Cambo	Thomas Erskine (c. 1746–1828); 9th Earl of Kellie, 9th Viscount of Fentoun (1606 & 1619), 9th Baron Erskine of Dirletowne, 9th Lord Dirletoun, 9th Baronet Erskine of Cambo	Methven Erskine (c. 1750–1829); 10th Earl of Kellie, 10th Viscount of Fentoun (1606 & 1619), 10th Baron Erskine of Dirletowne, 10th Lord Dirletoun, 10th Baronet Erskine of Cambo
Baronetcy Erskine of Cambo extinct, 1829
John Thomas Erskine (1772–1828); 25th Earl of Mar (1st creation), 8th Earl of Mar (7th creation)	Henry Erskine (1776–1846)	William Erskine (1759–1791); 7th Baronet Erskine of Cambo	Charles Erskine (1765–1799); 8th Earl of Kellie, 8th Viscount of Fentoun (1606 & 1619), 8th Baron Erskine of Dirletowne, 8th Lord Dirletoun, 8th Baronet Erskine of Cambo
John Francis Miller Erskine (1795–1866); 26th Earl of Mar (1st creation), 9th Earl of Mar (7th creation), 11th Earl of Kellie, 11th Viscount of Fentoun (1606 & 1619), 11th Baron Erskine of Dirletowne, 11th Lord Dirletoun	Frances Jemima Goodeve (d. 1842)	Walter Coningsby Erskine (1810–1872); 10th Earl of Mar (7th creation), 12th Earl of Kellie, 12th Viscount of Fentoun (1606 & 1619), 12th Baron Erskine of Dirletowne, 12th Lord Dirletoun
Frances Jemima Goodeve (1831–1887)	John Francis Erskine Goodeve-Erskine (1836–1930); 27th Earl of Mar (1st creation)	Walter Henry Erskine (1839–1888); 11th Earl of Mar (7th creation), 13th Earl of Kellie, 13th Viscount of Fentoun (1606 & 1619), 13th Baron Erskine of Dirletowne, 13th Lord Dirletoun
Alice Young (1858–1951)	Charles Walter Young (1862–1898)	John Francis Hamilton Sinclair Cunliffe Brookes Forbes Goodeve-Erskine (1868–1932); 28th Earl of Mar (1st creation)	Walter John Francis Erskine (1865–1955); 12th Earl of Mar (7th creation), 14th Earl of Kellie, 14th Viscount of Fentoun (1606 & 1619), 14th Baron Erskine of Dirletowne, 14th Lord Dirletoun
Charles Macdonald Lane (1882–1956)	Lionel Walter Erskine-Young (1891–1965); 29th Earl of Mar (1st creation)	John Erskine (1895–1953) styled Lord Erskine
James Clifton Lane (1914–1975); 30th Earl of Mar (1st creation)	John Francis Hervey Erskine (1921–1993); 13th Earl of Mar (7th creation), 15th Earl of Kellie, 15th Viscount of Fentoun (1606 & 1619), 15th Baron Erskine of Dirletowne, 15th Lord Dirletoun
Baron Erskine of Alloa Tower of Alloa in the County of Clackmannanshire, 2000
Margaret Alison Lane (b. 1940); 31st Countess of Mar (1st creation)	David Charles of Mar (1944–1967); Lord Garioch	James Thorne Erskine (b. 1949); 14th Earl of Mar (7th creation), 16th Earl of Kellie, 16th Viscount of Fentoun (1606 & 1619), 16th Baron Erskine of Dirletowne, 16th Lord Dirletoun, Baron Erskine of Alloa Tower
Susan Helen of Mar (b. 1963) styled Mistress of Mar
Heir presumptive to the Earldom of Mar
