= Clan Erskine =

Lowland Scottish clan

- Arascain ("air an sgian" - upon the knife)
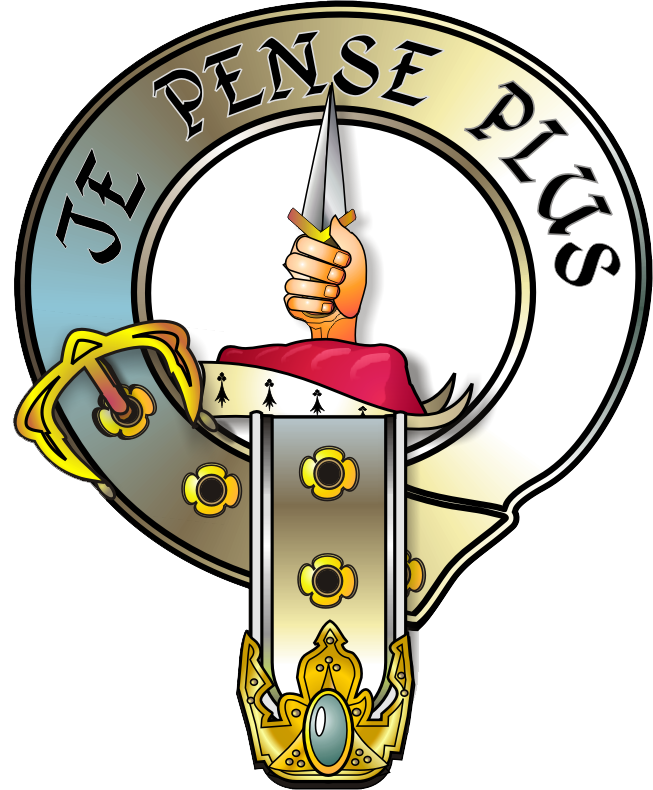
- Crest: On a chapeau Gules furred Ermine a hand holding up a skene in pale Argent, hilted and pommelled or.
- Motto: Je Pense Plus (I think more)

Profile
- Region: Lowlands

Chief
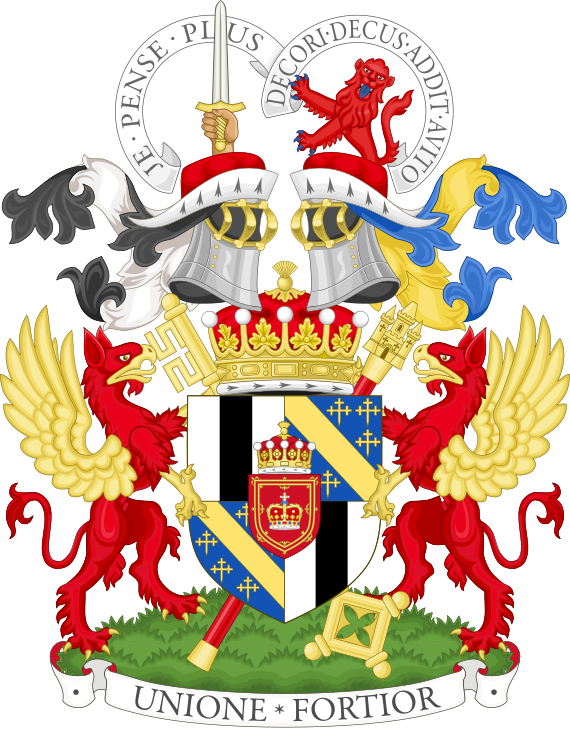
- James Thorne Erskine,
- The 14th Earl of Mar and the 16th Earl of Kellie
- Historic seat: Alloa Tower
Allied clans
Clan Bruce
Clan Stewart

Clan Erskine is a Scottish clan of the Scottish Lowlands.

== History ==
=== Origins of Clan Erskine ===
The surname Erskine was originally derived from the lands of Erskine, which is an area to the south of the River Clyde in Renfrew. The name is believed to be ancient or Old British for green rising ground.

As early as the reign of Alexander II of Scotland, Henry de Erskine was proprietor of the barony. In about 1226 Henry was a witness to a charter by the Earl of Lennox of the patronage and tithes of Rosneath to Paisley Abbey.

=== Wars of Scottish Independence ===
John de Irskyn was amongst the Scottish nobles who submitted to Edward I of England and appears on the Ragman Rolls of 1296. His son, another Sir John de Irskyn had three daughters. The eldest daughter married Thomas Bruce, the brother of king Robert the Bruce. Sir John de Irskyn's second daughter married Walter, the High Steward of Scotland.

=== 14th century ===
The Erskines were staunch supporters of the Clan Bruce. Sir Robert de Erskine was an illustrious and renowned figure of his time. David II of Scotland appointed him keeper of the strategic Stirling Castle. In 1350 Sir Robert Erskine was appointed as Chamberlain of Scotland and justicar north of the Forth. Erskine was also one of the nobles who established the succession to the throne of Robert II of Scotland, who was a grandson of the great Robert the Bruce and the first monarch of the Stewart dynasty in 1371.

=== 15th and 16th centuries ===
In the mid 15th century when Alexander Stewart, Earl of Mar died the Clan Erskine chief claimed the title, which was one of the great Celtic titles. Stewart had claimed the title through his wife, the Countess of Mar. Sir Robert Erskine, who had been created Lord Erskine claimed the title through his descent from the Countess of Mar. Erskine's claim was refused by the king who said that the title belonged to the crown because the last male holder had been a Stewart. However the Erskines became guardians to the young James IV of Scotland despite this dispute with the king. Five successive generations of Erskines were guardians of the royals.

In 1497 Alexander Erskine, third Lord Erskine constructed Alloa Tower, a massive tower that would be the seat of the clan chiefs for the next three hundred years. The third Lord Erskine's son was killed in 1513 at the Battle of Flodden. John Erskine, fifth Lord Erskine was guardian and tutor of James V of Scotland.

Mary, Queen of Scots had spent the first five years of her life around Alloa and Stirling Castle. She later bestowed upon the sixth Lord Erskine the title of Earl of Mar. Erskine was descended from Elyne, daughter of Gratney, 7th Earl of Mar. Although the Erskine chiefs are Earls of Mar and Kellie there is a separate Countess of Mar (chief of Clan Mar), who is a member of the Council of the Chiefs.

The seventh Lord Erskine took part in the Raid of Ruthven in 1582, in which the young James VI of Scotland was placed in the hands of an extremist faction of Protestant nobility for nearly a year. As a result, Erskine was exiled but was later restored to royal favour and in 1616 was made Lord High Treasurer of Scotland.

=== 17th century & Civil War ===
In 1615 Chief John Erskine, 20th Earl of Mar was appointed governor of Edinburgh Castle. He supported Charles I. Lord Erskine fought for the royalists at the Battle of Kilsyth in 1645. The family estates were forfeited for their support of the royalists but were later restored by Charles II in 1660.

=== 18th century and Jacobite risings ===
John Erskine, Earl of Mar was known as bobbing John due to his change of political allegiance in accordance with the needs of survival that was not unknown to the Scottish nobility. He had been a supporter of the Union, however when he attended court in London in 1714 he was not offered the post of Secretary of State for Scotland, which he considered to be an insult. He returned to his ancestral lands and raised the standard of James VIII (The Old Pretender), and called out his own clansmen and all loyal supporters of the House of Stuart. Erskine had soon gathered an army of over ten thousand clansmen. The earl led his army of Jacobites at the Battle of Sheriffmuir against the Duke of Argyll, which was fought on 13 November 1715. The battle was inconclusive although Argyll claimed victory. The Jacobite rising was a failure and Erskine, Earl of Mar fled to France. His title and lands were forfeited and in 1724 were purchased by another branch of the family. The earl had received the Jacobite title of Mar but this was abandoned in 1824 when the Erskines were restored to the earldom of Mar. The earldom of Kellie became united with the earldom of Mar in 1835. Kellie had originally been bestowed in 1619 on a younger son of the chiefly line.

== Clan Chief ==
The current Chief of Clan Erskine is James Erskine, 14th Earl of Mar who descends from the Earls of Mar, seventh Creation (1565) (as deemed by the House of Lords in 1875). He is chief of the name and arms of Erskine.

The Clan Mar now has a separate chief, Margaret of Mar, 31st Countess of Mar, who descends from the Earls of Mar, first creation (1404) (as deemed by Act of Parliament in 1885). She is chief of the name and arms of Mar.

== Tartan ==
Tartan image	Notes
	Areskyn tartan, as published in 1842 in Vestiarium Scoticum.

== Clan Castles ==
- Alloa Tower was the main seat of the chief of Clan Erskine.
- The House of Dun and the Dun Estate was home to the Clan Erskine family from 1375 until 1980, but archaeological evidence shows that people have lived here for at least 9,000 years. John Erskine of Dun was a key figure in the Scottish Reformation.
- Corgarff Castle was acquired by John Erskine, 19th Earl of Mar in 1626.
- Kellie Castle was purchased by Sir Thomas Erskine in 1613.
- Dryburgh Abbey was given to the Earl of Mar by King James VI of Scotland in 1544.
- Dirleton Castle
- Braemar Castle
- Rosslyn Castle
- Dunimarle Castle, near Culross, Fife, was built by the Erskine family in the 18th century.
- Kildrummy Castle was the seat of the original Earls of Mar. It was abandoned after the failed Jacobite Uprisings in 1716.

== Representations in popular culture ==
- Elizabeth Peters' 1976 romantic suspense novel, Legend in Green Velvet, prominently featured a (fictional) member of Clan Erskine, as well as the castle and Clan history.

== See also ==
- Scottish clan

== Family tree ==
Family tree of Clan Erskine.

EARLS OF MAR, 1404
Robert Erskine; 1st Lord Erskine; 13th Earl of Mar (died 1452)
Thomas Erskine; 2nd Lord Erskine; 14th Earl of Mar (died 1493)
Alexander Erskine; 3rd Lord Erskine; 15th Earl of Mar (died 1509)
Robert Erskine; 4th Lord Erskine; 16th Earl of Mar (died 1513)
John Erskine; 5th Lord Erskine; 17th Earl of Mar (died 1552)
EARLS OF MAR, 1565
John Erskine; 18th Earl of Mar; 1st Earl of Mar (died 1572)	Hon. Alexander Erskine of Gogar (died 1592)
EARLS OF KELLIE, 1619
John Erskine; 19th Earl of Mar; 2nd Earl of Mar (1558–1634)	Thomas Erskine; 1st Earl of Kellie (1566-1639)
Erskine baronets of Alva
John Erskine; 20th Earl of Mar; 3rd Earl of Mar (1585–1653)	James Erskine; 6th Earl of Buchan died 1640	Mary Douglas; 6th Countess of Buchan (died 1628)	Sir; Charles Erskine of Alva; 1st Baronet (Ancestor of Earls of Rosslyn) (died 1690)	Alexander Erskine; Viscount Fentoun (died 1633)
Erskine baronets of Cambo
John Erskine; 21st Earl of Mar; 4th Earl of Mar (died 1668)	James Erskine; 7th Earl of Buchan (died 1664)	Henry Erskine; Master of Cardross (1672-1745)	Thomas Erskine; 2nd Earl of Kellie (1615-1643)	Alexander Erskine; 3rd Earl of Kellie (1615-1677)	Sir; Charles Erskine of Cambo; 1st Baronet (died 1677)
Charles Erskine; 22nd Earl of Mar; 5th Earl of Mar (1650–1689)	William Erskine; 8th Earl of Buchan (died 1695)	David Erskine; 2nd Lord Cardross (1626-1671)	Alexander Erskine; 4th Earl of Kellie (1677-1710)	Sir; Alexander Erskine of Cambo; 2nd Baronet
John Erskine; 23rd Earl of Mar; 6th Earl of Mar (1675–1732)	James Erskine, Lord Grange (1679–1754)	Henry Erskine; 3rd Lord Cardross (1650-1693)	Alexander Erskine; 5th Earl of Kellie (died 1756)	Sir; David Erskine (1695-1769)
Thomas Erskine, Lord Erskine (1705–1766)	Lady Frances Erskine (died 1776)	James Erskine (died 1785)	David Erskine; 9th Earl of Buchan (1672-1745)	Thomas Erskine; 6th Earl of Kellie (1732-1781)	Archibald Erskine; 7th Earl of Kellie (1736-1795)	Sir; Charles Erskine (1730-1790)	Thomas Erskine; 9th Earl of Kellie (1745-1828)	Methven Erskine; 10th Earl of Kellie (1750-1829)
John Erskine; 24th Earl of Mar; 7th Earl of Mar (1741–1825)	Henry Erskine; 10th Earl of Buchan (1710-1767)	Charles Erskine; 8th Earl of Kellie (1764-1799)
John Erskine; 25th Earl of Mar; 8th Earl of Mar (1772–1828)	Henry Erskine (1776–1846)	David Erskine; 11th Earl of Buchan (1742-1829)	Hon. Henry Erskine (1746-1817)	Thomas Erskine; 1st Baron Erskine (1750-1823)
John Erskine; 26th Earl of Mar; 9th Earl of Mar; 11th Earl of Kellie (1795–1866)	Lady Frances Erskine (died 1842)	Walter Coningsby Erskine; 10th Earl of Mar; 12th Earl of Kellie (1810–1872)	Sir David Erskine	Henry Erskine; 12th Earl of Buchan (1783-1857)	David Erskine; 2nd Baron Erskine (1776-1855)
BARON ERSKINE
John Goodeve-Erskine; 27th Earl of Mar (1836–1930)	Lady Frances Goodeve (1831–1887)	Walter Erskine; 11th Earl of Mar; 13th Earl of Kellie (1839–1888)	David Erskine; 13th Earl of Buchan (1815-1899)	Thomas Erskine; 3rd Baron Erskine (1802-1877)	John Erskine; 4th Baron Erskine (1804-1882)
John Goodeve-Erskine; 28th Earl of Mar (1868–1932)	Charles Young (1862–1898)	Alice Young (1858–1951)	Walter Erskine; 12th Earl of Mar; 14th Earl of Kellie (1865–1955)	Shipley Erskine; 14th Earl of Buchan (1850-1934)	William Erskine; 5th Baron Erskine (1841-1913)
Lionel Erskine-Young; 29th Earl of Mar (1891–1965)	Charles Lane (1882–1956)	John Erskine, Lord Erskine (1895–1953)	Ronald Erskine; 15th Earl of Buchan (1878-1960)	Montagu Erskine; 6th Baron Erskine (1865-1957)
James of Mar; 30th Earl of Mar (1914–1975)	John Erskine; 13th Earl of Mar; 15th Earl of Kellie (1921–1993)	Donald Erskine; 16th Earl of Buchan (1899-1984)
David Charles of Mar, Lord Garioch (1944–1967)	Margaret of Mar; 31st Countess of Mar (born 1940)	James Erskine; 14th Earl of Mar; 16th Earl of Kellie (born 1949)	Hon. Alexander Erskine; Master of Mar and Kellie (born 1952)	Malcom Erskine; 17th Earl of Buchan (born 1930)
Susan of Mar; Mistress of Mar (born 1963)	Alexander Erskine (born 1979)	Hon. Alexander Erskine (born 1990)
