= Earl of Kellie =

Title in the Peerage of Scotland

Earldom of Kellie held with Earldom of Mar (7th creation)
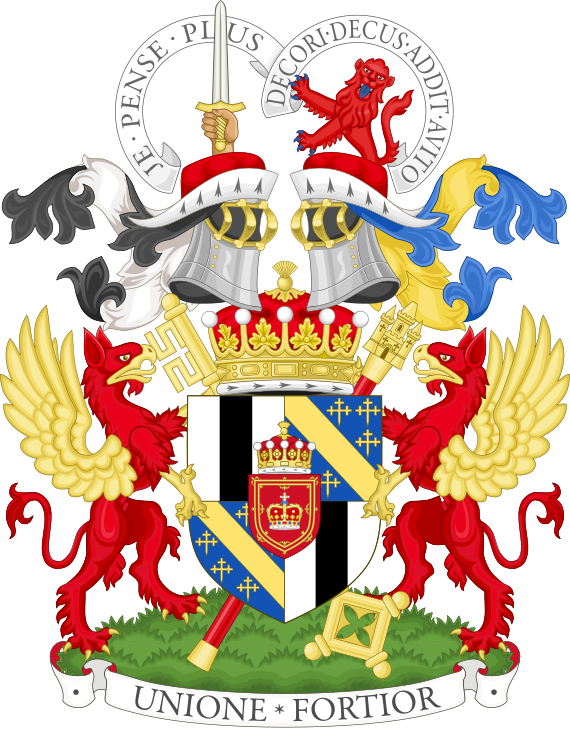
- Creation date: 1619
- Created by: James VI and I
- Peerage: Peerage of Scotland
- First holder: Thomas Erskine, 1st Earl of Kellie
- Present holder: James Thorne Erskine, 16th Earl of Kellie
- Heir presumptive: Hon. Alexander David Erskine
- Remainder to: heirs male of the body of the grantee
- Subsidiary titles: Earl of Mar, Viscount of Fentoun, Lord Erskine, Lord Erskine of Dirleton
- Status: Extant
- Seat: Hilton Farm
- Former seat: Kellie Castle

The title Earl of Kellie is a title in the Peerage of Scotland, created in 1619 for Sir Thomas Erskine, who was Captain of the Guard and Groom of the Stool for James VI. It is named after Barony of Kellie in Fife, Scotland. Since 1875, it has been held jointly with the Earldom of Mar (1565 creation).

The family seat is Hilton Farm, near Alloa, Clackmannanshire.

== History ==
The Earldom of Kellie was united with the Earldom of Mar in 1835, when the 26th Earl of Mar became also the 11th Earl of Kellie. At the death of that Earl in 1866, the Earldom of Kellie and the family's estates passed to Walter Erskine, the cousin of the late Earl, and his heir-male. Meanwhile, it was assumed that the Earldom of Mar passed to John Francis Goodeve, the late Earl's nephew, and his heir-general. Goodeve changed his name to Goodeve Erskine; his claim was agreed upon by most individuals. He even participated in the election of Scottish representative peers for the Peerage of Scotland.

However, the Earl of Kellie submitted a petition to the House of Lords asking that the Earldom of Mar be declared his, dying before it could be considered. His son, the 13th Earl of Kellie, renewed the petition, and the Lords decided the matter in 1875, determining that the Earldom of Mar properly belonged to the Earl of Kellie. However, due to a sentiment that the Lords had decided wrongly, the Earldom of Mar Restitution Act was passed. That Act declared that there were two Earldoms of Mar — one that would belong to the Earl of Kellie, and another that would belong to John Goodeve Erskine.

The subsidiary titles belonging to the Earl of Mar and Kellie are: Viscount of Fentoun or Fenton (created 1606), Lord Erskine (1429) and Lord Erskine of Dirleton (1603), the former of which is used as a courtesy title for the eldest son and heir of the Earl. Both titles are in the Peerage of Scotland. The Earl is Hereditary Keeper of Stirling Castle.

The family seat was Kellie Castle, near Pittenweem, Fife.

== Earls of Kellie (1619) ==
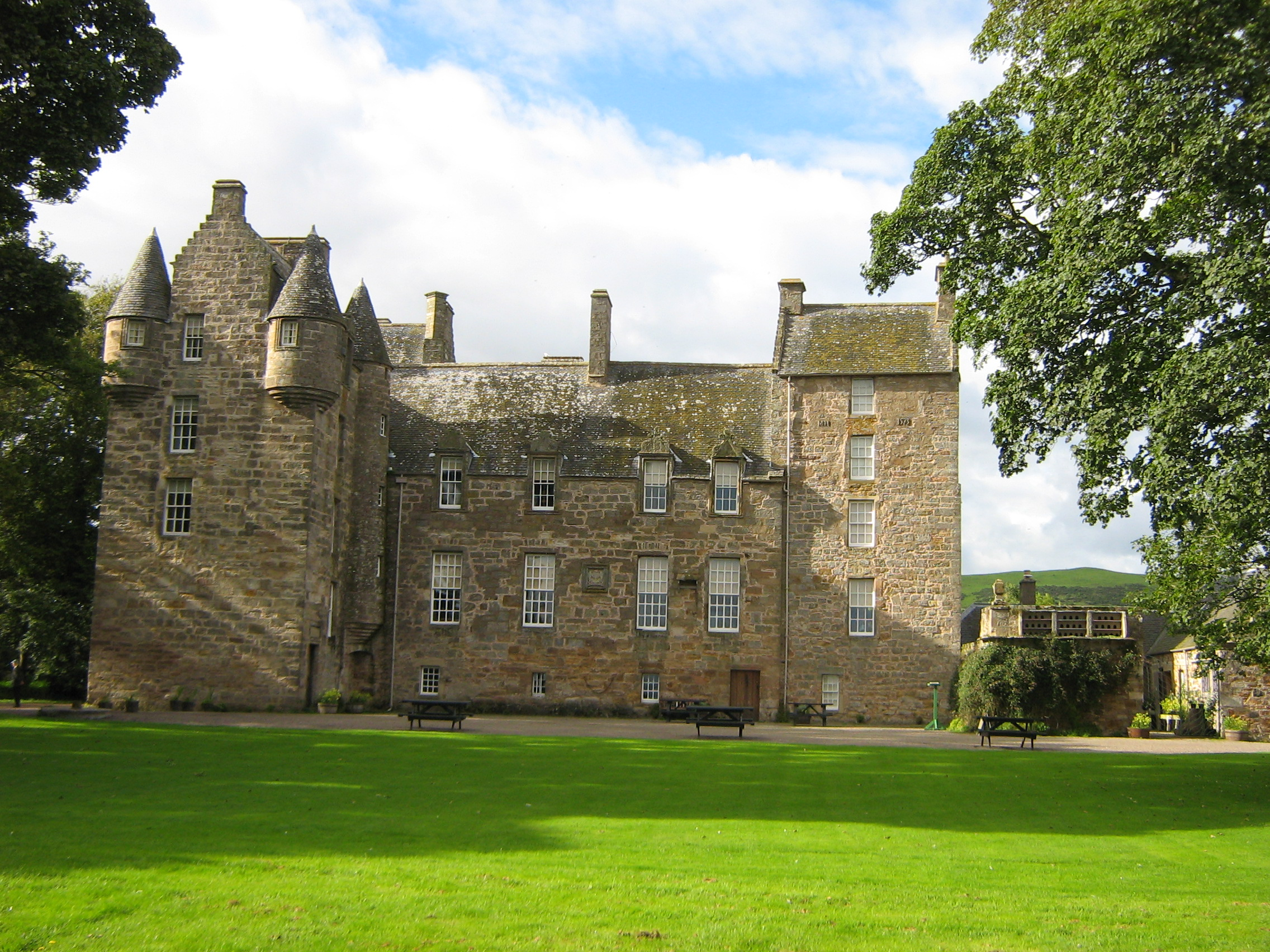
Kellie Castle, Fife

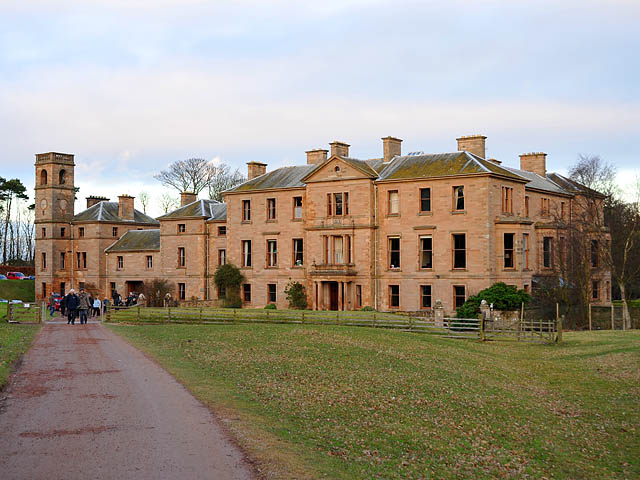
Cambo House, Fife

Also Viscount Fentoun (1606) and Lord Erskine of Dirleton (1603)

- Thomas Erskine (1566–1639), 1st Earl of Kellie, 1st Viscount Fentoun, 1st Lord Erskine of Dirleton
- Thomas Erskine (d. 1643), 2nd Earl of Kellie, 2nd Viscount Fentoun, 2nd Lord Erskine of Dirleton (predecessor's grandson)
- Alexander Erskine (d. 1677), 3rd Earl of Kellie, 3rd Viscount Fentoun, 3rd Lord Erskine of Dirleton (predecessor's brother)
- Alexander Erskine (d. 1710), 4th Earl of Kellie, 4th Viscount Fentoun, 4th Lord Erskine of Dirleton
- Alexander Erskine (d. 1756), 5th Earl of Kellie, 5th Viscount Fentoun, 5th Lord Erskine of Dirleton
- Thomas Alexander Erskine (1732–1781), 6th Earl of Kellie, 6th Viscount Fentoun, 6th Lord Erskine of Dirleton (predecessor's son)
- Archibald Erskine (1736–1795), 7th Earl of Kellie, 7th Viscount Fentoun, 7th Lord Erskine of Dirleton (predecessor's brother)
- Charles Erskine (1765–1799), 8th Earl of Kellie, 8th Viscount Fentoun, 8th Lord Erskine of Dirleton (predecessor's third cousin once removed). In 1791 he succeeded to the Erskine of Cambo Baronetcy which merged with the Earldom until its extinction in 1829.
- Thomas Erskine (c. 1745–1828), 9th Earl of Kellie, 9th Viscount Fentoun, 9th Lord Erskine of Dirleton (predecessor's brother)
- Methven Erskine (c. 1750–1829), 10th Earl of Kellie, 10th Viscount Fentoun, 10th Lord Erskine of Dirleton (predecessor's uncle)
- John Francis Miller Erskine (1795–1866), 11th Earl of Kellie, 11th Viscount Fentoun, 11th Lord Erskine of Dirleton (succeeded to Earldom of Kellie 1829, confirmed 9th/26th Earl of Mar 1835)
- Walter Coningsby Erskine (1810–1872), 12th Earl of Kellie, 12th Viscount Fentoun, 12th Lord Erskine of Dirleton (recognized posthumously as 10th Earl of Mar)
- Walter Henry Erskine (1839–1888), 13th Earl of Kellie, 13th Viscount Fentoun, 13th Lord Erskine of Dirleton (predecessor's son). Recognised 11th Earl of Mar 1875)
- Walter John Francis Erskine (1865–1955), 12th Earl of Mar, 14th Earl of Kellie, 14th Viscount Fentoun, 14th Lord Erskine of Dirleton (predecessor's son)
- John Francis Hervey Erskine (1921–1993), 13th Earl of Mar, 15th Earl of Kellie, 15th Viscount Fentoun, 15th Lord Erskine of Dirleton (predecessor's grandson)
- James Thorne Erskine (b. 1949), 14th Earl of Mar, 16th Earl of Kellie, 16th Viscount Fentoun, 16th Lord Erskine of Dirleton, 16th Lord Erskine of Dirleton, Baron Erskine of Alloa Tower (life peer)

The heir presumptive is the present holder's brother Alexander David Erskine, Master of Mar and Kellie (b. 1952). The heir presumptive's heir apparent is his only son Alexander Capel Erskine (b. 1979).

== Family tree ==
Erskine family tree including the Earls of Mar

Earls of Mar (1st creation), 1404
Robert Erskine (d. 1452); 13th Earl of Mar, 1st Lord Erskine
Thomas Erskine (d. 1493); 14th Earl of Mar, 2nd Lord Erskine
Alexander Erskine (d. 1509); 15th Earl of Mar, 3rd Lord Erskine	James II (1430–1460); King of Scots
Earl of Mar (4th creation) and Earl of Garioch, 1483	Earl of Mar (3rd creation) and Earl of Garioch, 1459
Robert Erskine (d. 1513); 16th Earl of Mar, 4th Lord Erskine	James III (1451/1452–1488); King of Scots	Alexander Stewart (c. 1454–1485); Duke of Albany, Earl of March, Earl of Mar and Garioch	John Stewart (c. 1456–c. 1479); Earl of Mar and Garioch
Earl of Mar (5th creation) and Earl of Garioch, 1486
John Erskine (1487–1555); 17th Earl of Mar, 5th Lord Erskine	James IV (1473–1513); King of Scots	John Stewart (1479–1503); Earl of Mar and Garioch
Earl of Mar (7th creation), 1565
John Erskine (d. 1572); 18th Earl of Mar (1st creation), 1st Earl of Mar (7th creation), 6th Lord Erskine	Alexander Erskine of Gogar (d. aft. 1592)	Margaret Erskine (1515–1572)	James V (1512–1542); King of Scots
Baron Erskine of Dirletowne (1604), Viscount of Fentoun (1606), Earl of Kellie, Lord Dirletoun, and Viscount of Fentoun (1619)	Earl of Mar and Garioch (6th creation), 1562
John Erskine (1558–1634); 19th Earl of Mar (1st creation), 2nd Earl of Mar (7th creation)	Thomas Erskine (1566–1639); 1st Earl of Kellie, etc.	James Stewart (c. 1531–1570); Earl of Mar and Garioch, 1st Earl of Moray, 1st Lord Abernethy, 1st Lord Strathdearn
Earldom of Mar and Garioch extinct, 1570
John Erskine (1585–1654); 20th Earl of Mar (1st creation), 3rd Earl of Mar (7th creation)	Alexander Erskine (d. 1633) styled Viscount Fentoun
Baronet Erskine of Cambo, county Fife (Nova Scotia), 1666
John Erskine (d. 1668); 21st Earl of Mar (1st creation), 4th Earl of Mar (7th creation)	Thomas Erskine (1615–1643); 2nd Earl of Kellie, etc.	Alexander Erskine (c. 1615–1639); 3rd Earl of Kellie, etc.	Charles Erskine (c. 1620–1677); 1st Baronet Erskine of Cambo
Charles Erskine (1650–1689); 22nd Earl of Mar (1st creation), 5th Earl of Mar (7th creation)	Alexander Erskine (1663–1727); 2nd Baronet Erskine of Cambo
John Erskine (1675–1732); 23rd Earl of Mar (1st creation), 6th Earl of Mar (7th creation)	James Erskine (1679–1754); Lord Grange	Alexander Erskine (1677–1710); 4th Earl of Kellie, etc.	Charles Erskine (1687–1753); 3rd Baronet Erskine of Cambo	John Erskine (1690–1754); 4th Baronet Erskine of Cambo	David Erskine (c. 1695–1769)	William Erskine (1695–1781); 5th Baronet Erskine of Cambo
Mar Earldom attainted, 1716
Thomas Erskine (1705–1766) styled Lord Erskine	Lady Frances Erskine (d. 1776)	James Erskine (d. 1785)	Alexander Erskine (d. 1756); 5th Earl of Kellie, etc.
Mar Earldom attainder lifted by Act of Parliament, 1824
John Francis Erskine (1741–1825); 24th Earl of Mar (1st creation), 7th Earl of Mar (7th creation)	Thomas Alexander Erskine (1732–1781); 6th Earl of Kellie, etc.	Archibald Erskine (1736–1797); 7th Earl of Kellie, etc.	Charles Erskine (1730–1790); 6th Baronet Erskine of Cambo	Thomas Erskine (c. 1746–1828); 9th Earl of Kellie, etc., 9th Baronet Erskine of Cambo	Methven Erskine (c. 1750–1829); 10th Earl of Kellie, etc., 10th Baronet Erskine of Cambo
Baronetcy Erskine of Cambo extinct, 1829
John Thomas Erskine (1772–1828); 25th Earl of Mar (1st creation), 8th Earl of Mar (7th creation)	Henry Erskine (1776–1846)	William Erskine (1759–1791); 7th Baronet Erskine of Cambo	Charles Erskine (1765–1799); 8th Earl of Kellie, etc., 8th Baronet Erskine of Cambo
John Francis Miller Erskine (1795–1866); 26th Earl of Mar (1st creation), 9th Earl of Mar (7th creation), 11th Earl of Kellie, etc.	Frances Jemima Goodeve (d. 1842)	Walter Coningsby Erskine (1810–1872); 10th Earl of Mar (7th creation), 12th Earl of Kellie, etc.
Frances Jemima Goodeve (1831–1887)	John Francis Erskine Goodeve-Erskine (1836–1930); 27th Earl of Mar (1st creation)	Walter Henry Erskine (1839–1888); 11th Earl of Mar (7th creation), 13th Earl of Kellie, etc.
Alice Young (1858–1951)	Charles Walter Young (1862–1898)	John Francis Hamilton Sinclair Cunliffe Brookes Forbes Goodeve-Erskine (1868–1932); 28th Earl of Mar (1st creation)	Walter John Francis Erskine (1865–1955); 12th Earl of Mar (7th creation), 14th Earl of Kellie, etc.
Charles Macdonald Lane (1882–1956)	Lionel Walter Erskine-Young (1891–1965); 29th Earl of Mar (1st creation)	John Erskine (1895–1953) styled Lord Erskine
James Clifton Lane (1914–1975); 30th Earl of Mar (1st creation)	John Francis Hervey Erskine (1921–1993); 13th Earl of Mar (7th creation), 15th Earl of Kellie, etc.
Baron Erskine of Alloa Tower of Alloa in the County of Clackmannanshire, 2000
Margaret Alison Lane (b. 1940); 31st Countess of Mar (1st creation)	David Charles of Mar (1944–1967); Lord Garioch	James Thorne Erskine (b. 1949); 14th Earl of Mar (7th creation), 16th Earl of Kellie, etc., Baron Erskine of Alloa Tower
Susan Helen of Mar (b. 1963) styled Mistress of Mar
Heir presumptive to the Earldom of Mar

== See also ==
- Earl of Mar (seventh creation)
- Erskine baronets
- Clan Erskine
- Kellie Lodge
