= John Erskine, 23rd Earl of Mar =

John Erskine, 23rd Earl of Mar may refer to:

- John Erskine, Earl of Mar (1675–1732) (known as "Bobbing John"), regarded as 23rd earl by some sources, and 22nd by others
- John Erskine, Earl of Mar (1741–1825), his grandson, regarded as 24th earl by some sources, and 23rd by others

== See also ==
- Earl of Mar § Notes
