= John Stewart, Earl of Mar =

John Stewart, Earl of Mar may refer to:

- John Stewart, Earl of Mar (d. 1479) (1450s–1470s), son of James II of Scotland
- John Stewart, Earl of Mar (d. 1503) (1470s–1503), son of James III of Scotland

== See also ==
- John Stewart (disambiguation)
