= John Erskine, 18th Earl of Mar =

John Erskine, 18th Earl of Mar may refer to:

- John Erskine, Earl of Mar (died 1572), regarded as 18th earl by some sources, and 17th by others.
- John Erskine, Earl of Mar (1558–1634), regarded as 19th earl by some sources, and 18th by others.

== See also ==
- Earl of Mar#Notes
