= Alexander Erskine =

Alexander Erskine may refer to:

- Alexander Erskine of Gogar (died 1592), Scottish landowner given charge of the child king of Scotland, James VI, from 1572 to 1578
- Alexander Erskine, 3rd Earl of Kellie (c. 1615–1677), Scottish soldier
- Alexander Erskine of Cambo (c. 1663–1727), Lord Lyon King of Arms

== See also ==
- Sir Alexander Erskine-Hill, 1st Baronet
- Erskine (surname)
