= Earl of Mar =

Earldom of Mar in the Peerage of Scotland

Earldom of Mar
- Creation date: 1404 (first creation, as ruled by Parliament); 1459 (third creation); 1483 (fourth creation); 1486 (fifth creation); 1562 (sixth creation); 1565 (seventh creation)
- Created by: James II (first creation, as ruled by Parliament); James II(third creation); James II (fourth creation); James III (fifth creation); Mary I (sixth creation); Mary I (seventh creation)
- Peerage: Peerage of Scotland
- First holder: Ruadrí, Earl of Mar
- Present holder: Margaret of Mar, 31st Countess of Mar (first creation); James Erskine, 14th Earl of Mar and 16th Earl of Kellie (seventh creation)
- Extinction date: 1479 (third creation); 1483 (fourth creation); 1503 (fifth creation); 1570 (sixth creation)
- Former seats: Mar's Wark, Kildrummy Castle and Doune of Invernochty

There are currently two earldoms of Mar in the Peerage of Scotland, and the title has been created seven times. The first creation of the earldom is currently held by Margaret of Mar, 31st Countess of Mar, who is also clan chief of Clan Mar. The seventh creation is currently held by James Erskine, 14th Earl of Mar and 16th Earl of Kellie, who is also clan chief of Clan Erskine.

The earldom is an ancient one. The first named earl is Ruadrí, who is known to have been alive in 1128, though an unnamed earl is mentioned as being present at the Battle of Clontarf in 1014. In 1435 the earldom was seized by King James II (16 October 1430 – 3 August 1460), and was then granted to several royal children, who produced no heirs. The sixth creation was for James Stewart, illegitimate son of King James V (10 April 1512 – 14 December 1542), who was stripped of the title after a rebellion in 1565.

The title was granted to John Erskine, a descendant of the original earls. In 1866, the previous Earl died childless, and it was unclear whether the earldom should pass to his heir male, or heir general. This led to the two decisions by the House of Lords, which created the two earldoms. In 1875, the House ruled that the earldom given to John Erskine in 1565 was the seventh creation, not a continuation of the first, and that it should pass to heirs male. In 1885, however, the House passed and Parliament enacted the Earldom of Mar Restitution Act 1885, which declared that the first creation of the earldom still existed, and was held by the heir general of the original earls.

Several earls of Mar have been prominent in Scottish history. In particular, John Erskine (d. 1572) served as Regent of Scotland after the abdication of Mary, Queen of Scots, and John Erskine (1675–1732) was a Jacobite commander who fled to France. Lionel Erskine-Young, 29th Earl of Mar (1891–1965) was a co-founder of the Royal Stuart Society to continue support for the Jacobite succession.

== History ==
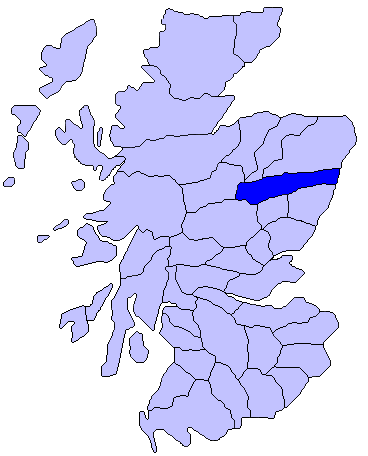
The ancient district of Mar

The earldom takes its name from Mar, an ancient province of Scotland running west from Aberdeen along the River Dee beyond Braemar ("upper Mar") to the Mar Lodge Estate. Mar expanded north past the River Don to become the region of Marr, which merged with Buchan to form the county of Aberdeenshire.

=== 9th–14th centuries ===
The first Mormaer of Mar is usually regarded as Ruadrí (fl. 1131), mentioned in the Book of Deer. Some modern sources give earlier mormaers, i.e. Muirchertach (Latinized as Martachus) and Gartnait (sometimes Gratnach), mentioned respectively in charters of the reigns of king Máel Coluim III (relating to the Céli Dé establishment of Loch Leven) and king Alexander I (relating to the monastic establishment of Scone), though in these cases certain identification with a particular province is difficult. The accounts of the Battle of Clontarf in some of the Irish annals name Domnall mac Eimín meic Cainnig, Mormaer of Mar, as among those killed in 1014 alongside Brian Boru.

The Mormaerdom comprised the larger portion of modern Aberdeenshire, extending from north of the River Don southward to the Mounth hills. Its principal seats were Migvie and Doune of Invernochty. The Mormaerdom may initially have alternated between two kin-groups, represented respectively by Morggán, and by Gille Críst. Gilchrist succeeded Morgund, but was himself succeeded by Donnchadh (Duncan), son of Morgund. On the other hand, we do not know Gilchrist's parentage, and chronologically he could have been an elder brother of Donnchadh.

No definite succession of earls appears till the 13th century, and from the middle of the 13th century the earls were recognized as among "the seven earls of Scotland". There was a settlement in around 1230 between Donnchadh and Thomas Durward, grandson, apparently, of Gilchrist, by which Durward had, it is said, £300 of land, a very large amount, which was scattered around the earldom, particularly at Fichlie, near Kildrummy, and Lumphanan in the lowland area. He also had Urquhart, but that probably had nothing to do with the earldom. Donnchadh got the title of Mormaer and the wealthier and militarily more useful upland parts of Mar. Earl Thomas died childless in 1374, but the earldom passed via Donnchadh's daughter Margaret to her husband William, Earl of Douglas.

=== 15th century ===
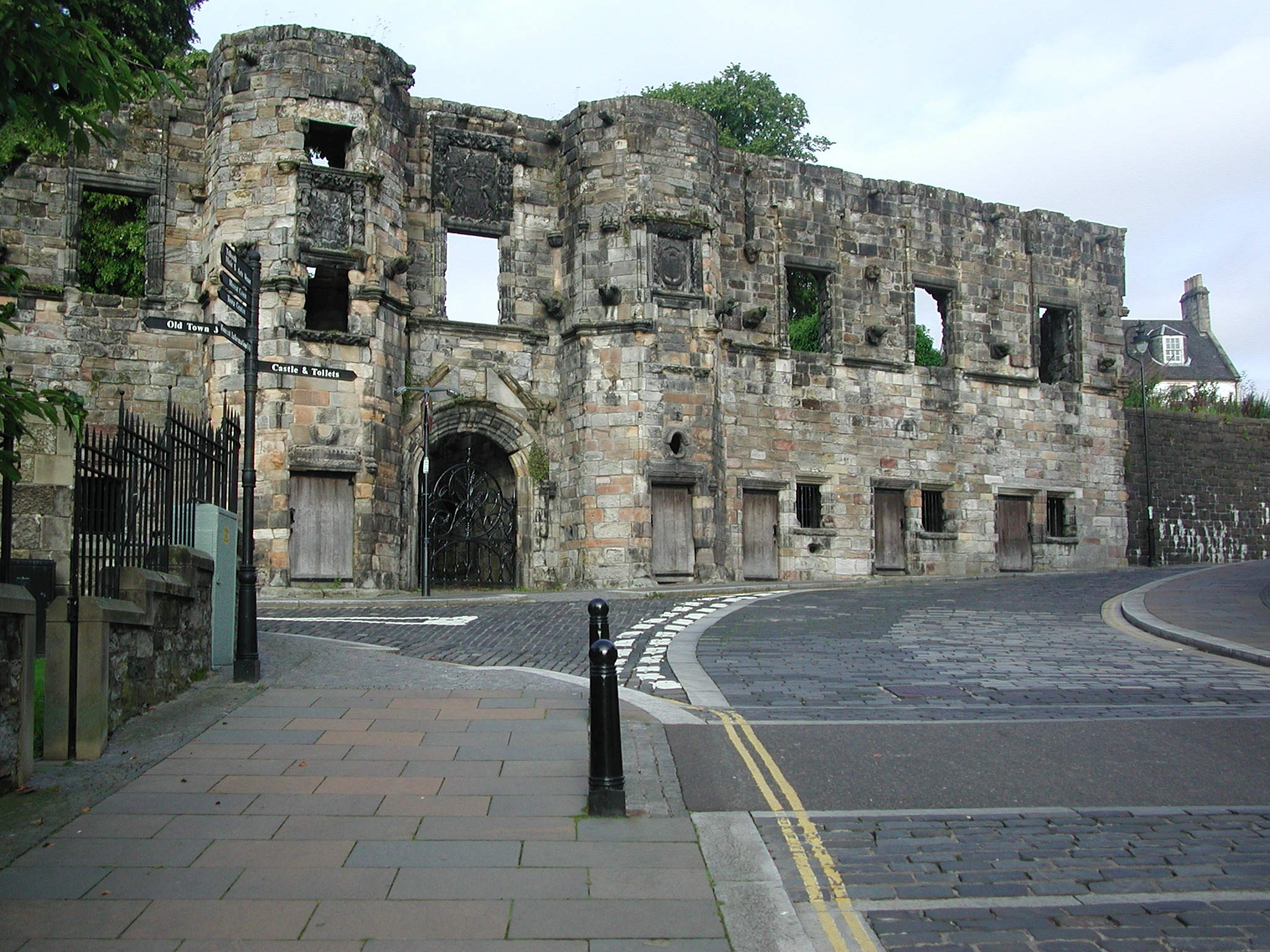
Mars Wark: The Earl of Mar's house in Stirling, situated on the approach to Stirling Castle, the Earl of Mar was governor of the castle during the mid-16th century.

While the eleventh (by some counts) holder of the title, William and Margaret's daughter Isabel Douglas, Countess of Mar, was alone at Kildrummy Castle, Alexander Stewart, following in the steps of his father the "Wolf of Badenoch" and his uncle Robert, Duke of Albany, murdered Sir Malcolm Drummond, Earl of Mar, captured Kildrummy Castle and forced Mar's widow Isabel Douglas, to marry him. He also forced her to sign a charter on 12 August 1404 yielding the earldom to him and his heirs. She revoked the charter later that year, but on marrying him, she gave him the earldom for life with remainder to her heirs. The King confirmed her last action the next year.

In 1426, Stewart resigned the title so that he could be granted a new one by the King, the new title being more "legitimate". The King did so, but specified that the earldom and associated lands would revert to the Crown upon the death of the Earl. In 1435, the Earl died, and Robert, Lord Erskine, a descendant of Gartnait, Earl of Mar through his daughter Helen, claimed the title, but the King claimed its lands under the specifications of reversion made in the patent. The issue remained unresolved until 1457, when James II obtained a court order declaring the lands as crown possessions. Thereafter, he bestowed the title on his son John, who died without heirs in 1479. It was next granted to James' other son, Alexander, Duke of Albany, but the title was then declared forfeit because of Alexander's alliances with the English. James III created his son John Earl of Mar in 1486, upon whose death in 1503 the title became extinct again.

=== 16th–18th centuries ===
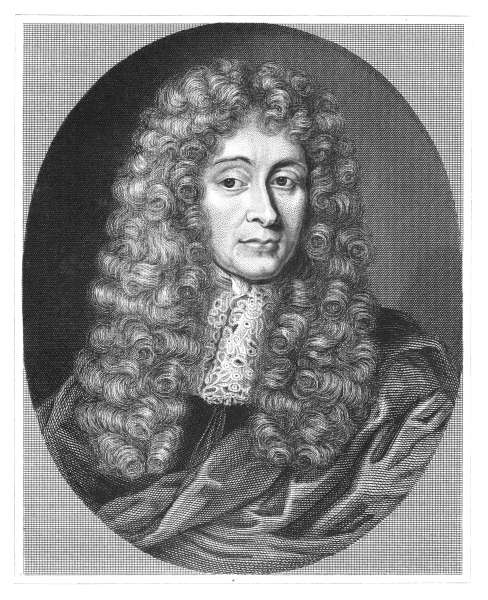
John Erskine, Earl of Mar from 1689 to 1716 (his attainder).

The title was once again created in 1562, for James, Earl of Moray, son of James V, but he, too, could not produce a qualified heir. Moray rebelled in 1565 (see Chaseabout Raid) in protest at the marriage of Mary, Queen of Scots, and Henry Stuart, Lord Darnley. Consequently, Queen Mary restored (or created) the earldom of Mar for John, Lord Erskine, heir to the Lord Erskine, heir of the ancient Earls through a cousin of Isabel, who quarrelled with James II about the Earldom. His son, also named John, recovered the Mar estates, alienated by the Crown during the long period that his family had been out of possession. John, the 23rd (or 6th Earl counting from 1565) was attainted for rebellion in 1716 (he was also created Duke of Mar in the Jacobite Peerages of Scotland and Ireland, and Earl of Mar in the Jacobite Peerage of England), and the Earldom remained forfeit for over a century.

=== 19th century ===
Mar Peerage Restoration Act 1824
- Act of Parliament
- Parliament of the United Kingdom
- Long title: An Act for exhibiting a Bill for the Restoration of John Francis Erskine of Mar.
- Citation: 5 Geo. 4. c. 59
- Territorial extent: United Kingdom

Dates
- Royal assent: 9 June 1824
- Commencement: 9 June 1824 (Note: The Acts of Parliament (Commencement) Act 1793.)
- Repealed: 5 August 1873
Other legislation
Repealed by	Statute Law Revision Act 1873

Status: Repealed

Text of statute as originally enacted

In 1824, the Earldom was restored by an act of Parliament, the Mar Peerage Restoration Act 1824 (5 Geo. 4. c. 59), to John Francis Erskine, the heir of the attainted Earl, in his 83rd year. His grandson, the ninth Earl, successfully claimed inheritance the earldom of Kellie and associated titles in 1835.

At the death of the 26th Earl of Mar and eleventh Earl of Kellie in 1866, the Earldom of Kellie and the family's estates passed to Walter Erskine, the cousin of the late Earl, and his heir male. Meanwhile, it was assumed that the Earldom of Mar passed to John Francis Goodeve, the late Earl's nephew, and his heir general. Goodeve changed his name to Goodeve Erskine; his claim was agreed upon by all. He even participated in the election of Scottish representative peers for the Peerage of Scotland. However, the Earl of Kellie submitted a petition to the House of Lords asking that the Earldom of Mar be declared his, dying before it could be considered. His son, the thirteenth Earl of Kellie, renewed the petition, and the Lords referred it to their Committee on Privileges. The petition made a number of claims:

- The original Earldom of Mar was a territorial title rather than a title of peerage and was therefore "indivisible." (In other words, the territory could not be separated from the title.)
- Alexander Stewart obtained a new royal charter for the Earldom, rather than receiving it in right of his wife Isabel.
- After the death of Alexander Stewart, his lands were passed to the sovereign in accordance with the charter, and thereafter were disposed of by the Crown.
- As the territorial earldom was "indivisible", upon the termination of the territory, the earldom must have ended also.
- Therefore, since the territorial earldom had already become non-existent, the 1565 grant was not a revival of that title. Rather, it was a totally new creation, this time in the form of a peerage title.
- Since the instrument of the 1565 grant cannot be found, the presumption ought to be that the earldom passes to heirs-male, and not to heirs-general. Thus, the Earl of Kellie is entitled to the Earldom of Mar as he is the late Earl of Mar's heir male, while John Goodeve Erskine was an heir-general.

Goodeve Erskine had different ideas, however. He portrayed the Crown's takeover of the territorial earldom not as pursuant to a charter, but rather as an act of tyranny. He argued:

- James I, in a tyrannical act, seized the lands of Alexander Stewart, when these should have passed to Robert, Lord Erskine.
- The "true" earls never agreed to terminate their claim to the earldom.
- The 1565 grant was a restitution of the old territorial earldom rather than a new creation.
- Because the title is a restoration of a territorial earldom, and because the territorial earldom could pass to heirs-general, John Goodeve Erskine was the rightful heir, being the late Earl of Mar's heir-general.

The House of Lords Committee on Privileges ruled in 1875, to the dissatisfaction of many, that the Earldom of Mar was newly created in 1565, passed only to heirs-male, and therefore belonged to the Earl of Kellie, and not to Goodeve Erskine. The Lord Chancellor, Roundell Palmer, 1st Baron Selborne, declared it to be "final, right or wrong, and not to be questioned".

Earldom of Mar Restitution Act 1885 (Note: The citation of this act by this short title was authorised by section 1 of, and the first schedule to, the Short Titles Act 1896. Due to the repeal of those provisions it is now authorised by section 19(2) of the Interpretation Act 1978.)
- Act of Parliament
- Parliament of the United Kingdom
- Long title: An Act for restitution of the ancient dignity and title of Earl of Mar.
- Citation: 48 & 49 Vict. c. 48
- Territorial extent: United Kingdom

Dates
- Royal assent: 6 August 1885
- Commencement: 6 August 1885 (Note: Section 3.)

Status: Current legislation

Text of statute as originally enacted

However, there was a sentiment that the Lords had decided wrongly. A bill was brought to Parliament, to allow Goodeve Erskine to assume the title, and was passed without dissent. The Earldom of Mar Restitution Act 1885 (48 & 49 Vict. c. 48) declared that because of the doubts relating to the 1565 creation, it would be assumed that there are two Earldoms of Mar. The Earldom created in 1565 would be held by the Earl of Kellie. The ancient earldom, however, was declared to be still in existence, and was given to John Goodeve Erskine. For the purposes of precedence, it is assumed that the earldom held by Goodeve Erskine's heirs was created in 1404.

== Titleholders ==
=== Early earls ===
- Cainnech (?)
- Eimen (?)
- Domnall (died 1014 (Clontarf)
- —
- Muirchertach (?) (fl. 1115)
- Ruadrí, Earl of Mar (fl. 1130s)
- Gille Chlerig, Earl of Mar (fl. 1140s)
- Morggán, Earl of Mar (died before 1183)
- Gille Críst, Earl of Mar (died c. 1203)
- Donnchadh, Earl of Mar (died c. 1244)
- Uilleam, Earl of Mar (died c. 1276)
- Domhnall I, Earl of Mar (died c. 1301)
- Gartnait, Earl of Mar (died c. 1305)
- Domhnall II, Earl of Mar (died 1332)
- Thomas, Earl of Mar (died 1374)
- Margaret, Countess of Mar (died c. 1391)
  - William Douglas, 1st Earl of Douglas and Mar, jure uxoris Earl of Mar (1327–1384)
  - James Douglas, 2nd Earl of Douglas and Mar, jure matris Earl of Mar (1358-k.1388 Battle of Otterburn)
- Isabel Douglas, Countess of Mar (c. 1360–1408)
  - Alexander Stewart, Earl of Mar (c. 1375–1435), second husband of Isabel Douglas (died 1408); recognised as Earl jure uxoris from marriage in 1404.

=== Earls of Mar, first creation (1404) (as decided by Earldom of Mar Restitution Act 1885) ===
Earldom of Mar (1st creation)
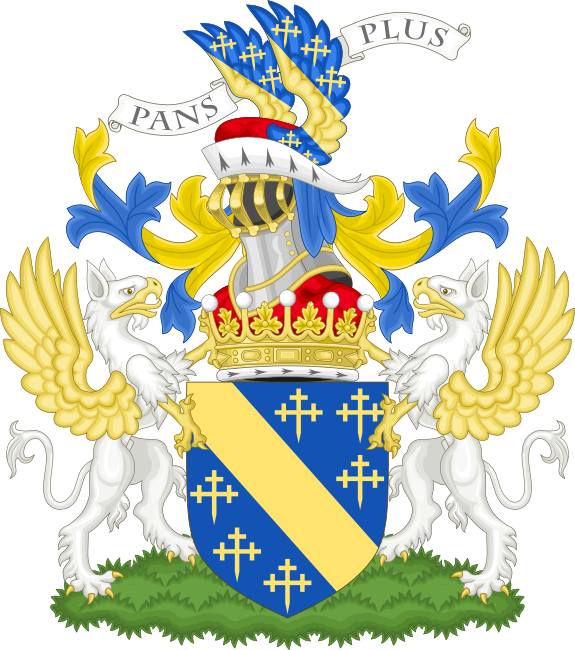
- Creation date: c. 1014
- Created by: Malcolm II
- Peerage: Peerage of Scotland
- First holder: Ruadrí, Earl of Mar
- Present holder: Margaret of Mar, 31st Countess of Mar
- Heir presumptive: Susan of Mar, Mistress of Mar
- Remainder to: heirs general of the body of the grantee
- Subsidiary titles: Lord Garioch (1320)

Other title: Lord Garioch (1320)

- Robert Erskine, 1st Lord Erskine, (d. 1453). Deemed 13th Earl of Mar by the 1885 act, with precedence from 1404. (Note: The first creation dating from 1404, recognizes Alexander Stewart as 12th earl. Some sources discount Stewart from this creation, lowering subsequent numbers by one.)
- Thomas Erskine, 2nd Lord Erskine, 14th Earl of Mar (d. 1494)
- Alexander Erskine, 3rd Lord Erskine, 15th Earl of Mar (d. 1510)
- Robert Erskine, 4th Lord Erskine, 16th Earl of Mar (d. 1513)
- John Erskine, 5th Lord Erskine, 17th Earl of Mar (d. 1555)
- John Erskine, 6th Lord Erskine, 18th and 1st Earl of Mar (d. 1572). Deemed to have been created Earl of Mar by the House of Lords in 1875, and restored to the first creation of the earldom by the Earldom of Mar Restitution Act 1885.
- John Erskine, 19th and 2nd Earl of Mar (c. 1558–1634)
- John Erskine, 20th and 3rd Earl of Mar (c. 1585–1654)
- John Erskine, 21st and 4th Earl of Mar (d. 1668)
- Charles Erskine, 22nd and 5th Earl of Mar (1650–1689)
- John Erskine, 23rd and 6th Earl of Mar (1675–1732). Attainted 1716.
  - Thomas Erskine, Lord Erskine (c. 1705–1766)
- John Francis Erskine, 24th and 7th Earl of Mar (1741–1825). Restored to earldom in 1824.
- John Thomas Erskine, 25th and 8th Earl of Mar (1772–1828)
- John Francis Miller Erskine, 26th and 9th Earl of Mar, 11th Earl of Kellie (1795–1866). Established his right to the earldom of Kellie in 1835.
- John Francis Erskine Goodeve-Erskine, 27th Earl of Mar (1836–1930). Confirmed as Earl of Mar of the first creation by the Earldom of Mar Restitution Act 1885.
- John Francis Hamilton Sinclair Cunliffe Brooks Forbes Goodeve-Erskine, 28th Earl of Mar (1868–1932)
- Lionel Walter Erskine-Young, 29th Earl of Mar (1891–1965)
- James Clifton of Mar, 30th Earl of Mar (1914–1975)
- Margaret Alison of Mar, 31st Countess of Mar (b. 1940)

The heir presumptive is the present holder's daughter Susan Helen of Mar, Mistress of Mar (b. 1963).

=== Earls of Mar and Garioch, third creation (1459) ===
- John Stewart, 1st Earl of Mar and Garioch (died 1479)
  - Lands granted to James III's favourite, Robert Cochrane, in 1480 (died 1482).

=== Earls of Mar and Garioch, fourth creation (1483) ===
- Alexander Stewart, 1st Duke of Albany (c. 1454–1485) (forfeit 1483)

=== Earls of Mar and Garioch, fifth creation (1486) ===
- John Stewart, 1st Earl of Mar and Garioch (died 1503)

=== Earls of Mar, sixth creation (1562) ===
- James Stewart, 1st Earl of Moray and Mar (died 1570)

Earldom of Mar (seventh creation) held with Earldom of Kellie
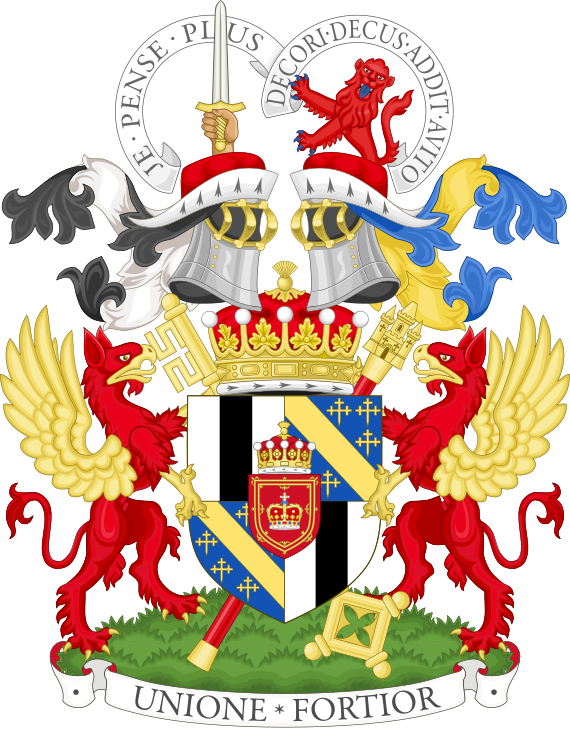
- Creation date: 1565
- Created by: Mary, Queen of Scots
- Peerage: Peerage of Scotland
- First holder: John Erskine, 1st and 18th Earl of Mar
- Present holder: James Erskine, 14th Earl of Mar
- Heir presumptive: Hon. Alexander David Erskine
- Remainder to: heirs male of the body of the grantee
- Subsidiary titles: Viscount of Fentoun, Lord Erskine, Lord Erskine of Dirleton

=== Earls of Mar, seventh creation (1565) (as decided by the House of Lords in 1875) ===
Other titles: Earl of Kellie (1619), Viscount of Fentoun (1606), Lord Erskine (1429) and Lord Erskine of Dirleton (1603).

For the first ten earls of the seventh creation see the first creation, above.

- John Francis Miller Erskine, 11th Earl of Kellie, 9/26th Earl of Mar (1795–1866). Established his right to the earldom of Kellie in 1835.
- Walter Coningsby Erskine, 12th Earl of Kellie (1810–1872). Recognized posthumously as 10th Earl of Mar.
- Walter Henry Erskine, 13th Earl of Kellie, 11th Earl of Mar (1839–1888) Recognised as Earl of Mar of the seventh creation by a decision of the House of Lords in 1875.
- Walter John Francis Erskine, 12th Earl of Mar and 14th Earl of Kellie (1865–1955)
- John Francis Hervey Erskine, 13th Earl of Mar and 15th Earl of Kellie (1921–1993)
- James Thorne Erskine, 14th Earl of Mar and 16th Earl of Kellie (b. 1949)

The heir presumptive is the present holder's brother, the Hon. Alexander David Erskine, Master of Mar and Kellie (b. 1952), whose heir is his son Alisdair Capel Erskine (b. 1979).

== Family tree ==
Erskine family tree including the Earls of Mar

Earls of Mar (1st creation), 1404
Robert Erskine (d. 1452); 13th Earl of Mar, 1st Lord Erskine
Thomas Erskine (d. 1493); 14th Earl of Mar, 2nd Lord Erskine
Alexander Erskine (d. 1509); 15th Earl of Mar, 3rd Lord Erskine	James II (1430–1460); King of Scots
Earl of Mar (4th creation) and Earl of Garioch, 1483	Earl of Mar (3rd creation) and Earl of Garioch, 1459
Robert Erskine (d. 1513); 16th Earl of Mar, 4th Lord Erskine	James III (1451/1452–1488); King of Scots	Alexander Stewart (c. 1454–1485); Duke of Albany, Earl of March, Earl of Mar and Garioch	John Stewart (c. 1456–c. 1479); Earl of Mar and Garioch
Earl of Mar (5th creation) and Earl of Garioch, 1486
John Erskine (1487–1555); 17th Earl of Mar, 5th Lord Erskine	James IV (1473–1513); King of Scots	John Stewart (1479–1503); Earl of Mar and Garioch
Earl of Mar (7th creation), 1565
John Erskine (d. 1572); 18th Earl of Mar (1st creation), 1st Earl of Mar (7th creation), 6th Lord Erskine	Alexander Erskine of Gogar (d. aft. 1592)	Margaret Erskine (1515–1572)	James V (1512–1542); King of Scots
Baron Erskine of Dirletowne (1604), Viscount of Fentoun (1606), Earl of Kellie, Lord Dirletoun, and Viscount of Fentoun (1619)	Earl of Mar and Garioch (6th creation), 1562
John Erskine (1558–1634); 19th Earl of Mar (1st creation), 2nd Earl of Mar (7th creation)	Thomas Erskine (1566–1639); 1st Earl of Kellie, etc.	James Stewart (c. 1531–1570); Earl of Mar and Garioch, 1st Earl of Moray, 1st Lord Abernethy, 1st Lord Strathdearn
Earldom of Mar and Garioch extinct, 1570
John Erskine (1585–1654); 20th Earl of Mar (1st creation), 3rd Earl of Mar (7th creation)	Alexander Erskine (d. 1633) styled Viscount Fentoun
Baronet Erskine of Cambo, county Fife (Nova Scotia), 1666
John Erskine (d. 1668); 21st Earl of Mar (1st creation), 4th Earl of Mar (7th creation)	Thomas Erskine (1615–1643); 2nd Earl of Kellie, etc.	Alexander Erskine (c. 1615–1639); 3rd Earl of Kellie, etc.	Charles Erskine (c. 1620–1677); 1st Baronet Erskine of Cambo
Charles Erskine (1650–1689); 22nd Earl of Mar (1st creation), 5th Earl of Mar (7th creation)	Alexander Erskine (1663–1727); 2nd Baronet Erskine of Cambo
John Erskine (1675–1732); 23rd Earl of Mar (1st creation), 6th Earl of Mar (7th creation)	James Erskine (1679–1754); Lord Grange	Alexander Erskine (1677–1710); 4th Earl of Kellie, etc.	Charles Erskine (1687–1753); 3rd Baronet Erskine of Cambo	John Erskine (1690–1754); 4th Baronet Erskine of Cambo	David Erskine (c. 1695–1769)	William Erskine (1695–1781); 5th Baronet Erskine of Cambo
Mar Earldom attainted, 1716
Thomas Erskine (1705–1766) styled Lord Erskine	Lady Frances Erskine (d. 1776)	James Erskine (d. 1785)	Alexander Erskine (d. 1756); 5th Earl of Kellie, etc.
Mar Earldom attainder lifted by Act of Parliament, 1824
John Francis Erskine (1741–1825); 24th Earl of Mar (1st creation), 7th Earl of Mar (7th creation)	Thomas Alexander Erskine (1732–1781); 6th Earl of Kellie, etc.	Archibald Erskine (1736–1797); 7th Earl of Kellie, etc.	Charles Erskine (1730–1790); 6th Baronet Erskine of Cambo	Thomas Erskine (c. 1746–1828); 9th Earl of Kellie, etc., 9th Baronet Erskine of Cambo	Methven Erskine (c. 1750–1829); 10th Earl of Kellie, etc., 10th Baronet Erskine of Cambo
Baronetcy Erskine of Cambo extinct, 1829
John Thomas Erskine (1772–1828); 25th Earl of Mar (1st creation), 8th Earl of Mar (7th creation)	Henry Erskine (1776–1846)	William Erskine (1759–1791); 7th Baronet Erskine of Cambo	Charles Erskine (1765–1799); 8th Earl of Kellie, etc., 8th Baronet Erskine of Cambo
John Francis Miller Erskine (1795–1866); 26th Earl of Mar (1st creation), 9th Earl of Mar (7th creation), 11th Earl of Kellie, etc.	Frances Jemima Goodeve (d. 1842)	Walter Coningsby Erskine (1810–1872); 10th Earl of Mar (7th creation), 12th Earl of Kellie, etc.
Frances Jemima Goodeve (1831–1887)	John Francis Erskine Goodeve-Erskine (1836–1930); 27th Earl of Mar (1st creation)	Walter Henry Erskine (1839–1888); 11th Earl of Mar (7th creation), 13th Earl of Kellie, etc.
Alice Young (1858–1951)	Charles Walter Young (1862–1898)	John Francis Hamilton Sinclair Cunliffe Brookes Forbes Goodeve-Erskine (1868–1932); 28th Earl of Mar (1st creation)	Walter John Francis Erskine (1865–1955); 12th Earl of Mar (7th creation), 14th Earl of Kellie, etc.
Charles Macdonald Lane (1882–1956)	Lionel Walter Erskine-Young (1891–1965); 29th Earl of Mar (1st creation)	John Erskine (1895–1953) styled Lord Erskine
James Clifton Lane (1914–1975); 30th Earl of Mar (1st creation)	John Francis Hervey Erskine (1921–1993); 13th Earl of Mar (7th creation), 15th Earl of Kellie, etc.
Baron Erskine of Alloa Tower of Alloa in the County of Clackmannanshire, 2000
Margaret Alison Lane (b. 1940); 31st Countess of Mar (1st creation)	David Charles of Mar (1944–1967); Lord Garioch	James Thorne Erskine (b. 1949); 14th Earl of Mar (7th creation), 16th Earl of Kellie, etc., Baron Erskine of Alloa Tower
Susan Helen of Mar (b. 1963) styled Mistress of Mar
Heir presumptive to the Earldom of Mar

== In popular culture ==
"The Earl of Mar's Daughter" is a child ballad documented by Francis James Child.

The Genesis song "Eleventh Earl of Mar" on their album Wind & Wuthering (1977) depicts the failure of the unsuccessful Jacobite campaign and the innocence of the Earl's young son.

Mar is one of the provinces in the board game Britannia.

== See also ==
- Clan Erskine
- Clan Mar

== Bibliography ==
- Anderson, Alan Orr, Early Sources of Scottish History: AD 500–1286, 2 Vols (Edinburgh, 1922)
- Burke's Peerage and Baronetage, 105th ed. (1978) ISBN (none)
- Debrett's Peerage and Baronetage 147th ed. (2008) ISBN 978-1-870520-80-5
- Oram Richard D., "The Earls and Earldom of Mar, c1150–1300", Steve Boardman and Alasdair Ross (eds.) The Exercise of Power in Medieval Scotland, c.1200–1500, (Dublin/Portland, 2003). pp. 46–66
- Roberts, John L., Lost Kingdoms: Celtic Scotland in the Middle Ages, (Edinburgh, 1997)
