= Erskine baronets of Cambo (second creation, 1821) =

Escutcheon of the Erskine baronets of Cambo (second creation)

The Erskine baronetcy, of Cambo in the County of Fife, was created in the Baronetage of the United Kingdom on 27 August 1821 for David Erskine, a grandson through an illegitimate line of Thomas Erskine, 9th Earl of Kellie. The original baronetcy of Cambo became extinct on the death of the tenth Earl of Kellie in 1829.

The 2nd Baronet was a Deputy Lieutenant of Denbighshire. The 3rd Baronet was a Deputy Lieutenant of Fife. The 5th Baronet was Convenor of the Fife County Council between 1970 and 1973 and Vice-Lord Lieutenant of Fife between 1981 and 1987. The title has descended in a direct line from father to son.

== Erskine baronets, of Cambo (1821) ==
- Sir David Erskine, 1st Baronet (1792–1841)
- Sir Thomas Erskine, 2nd Baronet (1824–1902)
- Sir ffolliott Williams Erskine, 3rd Baronet (1850–1912)
- Lt.-Col. Sir Thomas Wilfrid Hargreaves John Erskine, DSO, 4th Baronet (1880–1944)
- Sir (Thomas) David Erskine, 5th Baronet (1912–2007)
- Sir Thomas Peter Neil Erskine, 6th Baronet (born 1950)

The heir apparent is Thomas Struan Erskine (born 1977), eldest son of the present holder.

== Extended family ==
Sir James Malcolm Monteith Erskine, second son of Captain David Holland Erskine, second son of the first Baronet, sat as Member of Parliament for Westminster St George's. His son Sir Derek Quick Erskine (1905–1977) was a member of the Legislative Council of Kenya.

== Notes ==
Baronetage of the United Kingdom
Preceded by Carmichael baronets	Erskine baronets of Cambo (second creation); 27 August 1821	Succeeded by Young baronets
