= The Bachelor's Club =

The Bachelor's Club may refer to:

- The Bachelor's Club (1921 film), a British silent comedy film
- The Bachelor's Club (1929 film), an American independent comedy film

== See also ==
- Bachelors' Club, a London gentlemen's club
- Bachelors' Club, Tarbolton, a Scottish society
- Royal Bachelors' Club, a Swedish society
