= Carmichael baronets of Nutwood (1821) =

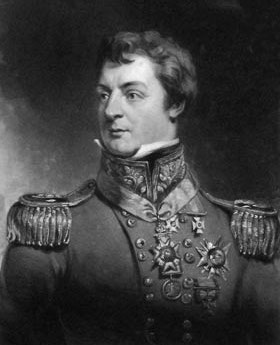
Sir James Carmichael-Smyth, 1st Baronet

The Carmichael-Smyth, later Carmichael baronetcy, of Nutwood in the County of Surrey, was created in the Baronetage of the United Kingdom on 25 August 1821 for the colonial administrator Sir James Carmichael-Smyth. He was the eldest son of the Scottish physician and medical writer James Carmichael Smyth, the only son of Thomas Carmichael of Balmedie and Margaret Smyth of Athenry.

The 2nd Baronet discontinued the use of the surname Smyth in 1841. The 3rd Baronet, James Morse Carmichael, was a Liberal politician. He claimed the dormant earldom of Hyndford, a claim that was rejected. He was unmarried and the baronetcy became extinct on his death in 1902.

== Carmichael-Smyth, later Carmichael baronets of Nutwood (1821) ==
- Sir James Carmichael-Smyth, 1st Baronet (1780–1838)
- Sir James Robert Carmichael, 2nd Baronet (1817–1883)
- Sir James Morse Carmichael, 3rd Baronet (1844–1902)

== Notes ==
Baronetage of the United Kingdom
| Preceded by Dundas baronets | Carmichael baronets of Nutwood; 25 August 1821 | Succeeded by Erskine baronets |
