= Marr, Scotland =

British committee area

Coordinates: 57°13′35″N 2°46′38″W

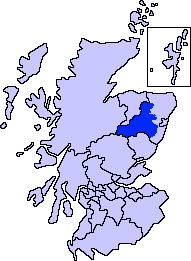
Map of Scotland showing the present-day committee area of Marr

Marr (Scottish Gaelic: Màrr) is one of six committee areas in Aberdeenshire, Scotland. It has a population of 34,038 (2001 census). Someone from Marr is called a Màrnach in Scottish Gaelic.

== Etymology ==
The genesis of the name Marr is uncertain. Mar, a Brittonic personal name, may be involved. Further possibilities include a connection with the ethnic names Marsi and Marsigni of Italy and Bohemia, or a derivation from Old Norse marr meaning "sea, marsh, fen".

American academic Thomas Clancy has noted cautiously the similarity between the territory names Buchan and Marr to those of the Welsh commotes Cantref Bychan and Cantref Mawr, meaning "large commote" and "small commote", respectively. Linguist Guto Rhys adjudged the proposal "appealing" but "questionable", on the basis that the form Marr conflicts with the expected development of mawr.

== Features ==
To the west, the mountain environment of the Cairngorms National Park sustains a well-developed tourist industry based on heritage and outdoor pursuits. Forestry and livestock farming are key industries, particularly in remoter areas. Part of the area has qualified for EU financial assistance. To the east, Marr has experienced population growth due to its strong commuter links with the city of Aberdeen.

The committee area consists of three wards of Aberdeenshire council:

- Aboyne, Upper Deeside and Donside
- Banchory and Mid-Deeside
- Huntly, Strathbogie and Howe of Alford

Between them the three wards elect ten councillors to the 68-member council.

== Historic province ==
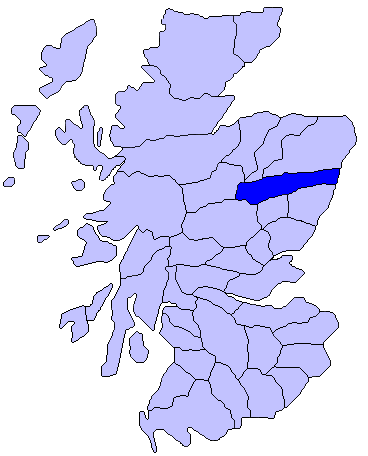
Map of Scotland showing the historic district of Mar

Marr is named after Mar, one of the historic provinces of Scotland, extending from north of the Don southward to the Mounth. Like other such areas, it was under the rule of a mormaer in the Middle Ages. In the 12th century an earl (the Earl of Mar) took his place, but no definite succession of earls appears until the 13th century, nor has any genealogical connection been established between them and the mormaers.

In the eleventh century Malcolm III introduced the office of sheriff to Scotland. He and his successors Edgar, Alexander I and in particular David I established sheriffdoms throughout the country. In the mid-19th century, local government reforms replaced the ancient provinces with new counties (shires), aligned to sheriffdom boundaries; hence, Marr became the southern portion of the shire of Aberdeen.
