= Doune of Invernochty =

Castle in Scotland

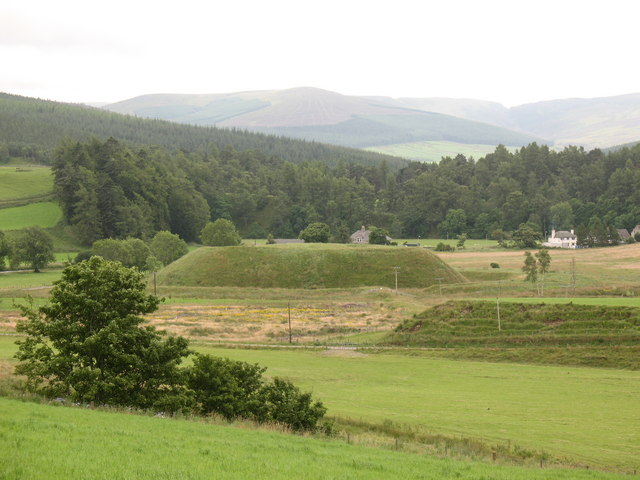
- Doune of Invernochty
- Coordinates: 57.202836°N 3.0751053°W

Scheduled monument
- Official name: Doune of Invernochty
- Type: Secular: motte
- Designated: 13 August 1953
- Reference no.: SM94

The Doune of Invernochty is a 12th-century castle in the Cairngorms National Park in Scotland, of which only earthworks survive. The Royal Commission on the Ancient and Historical Monuments of Scotland (RCAHMS) note that it is "one of the finest examples of Norman earthwork castles in Scotland, and appears to be the sole Scottish example of a motte with Norman stonework on its summit." It is located at grid reference NJ352129, near Strathdon, Aberdeenshire (which used to be called Invernochty), near the confluence of the River Don and the Water of Nochty. Doune of Invernochty is a scheduled monument. The name derives from the Gaelic Dùn Inbhir Nochdaidh which means "fort at the confluence of the Nochty."

The Doune of Invernochty was built in the later 12th or early 13th century, and is likely to have been the work of the Mormaer (Earl) of Mar. It was built at a time following the Davidian Revolution of King David I, which saw the introduction of Norman feudalism into Scotland. The remaining structure is a moated motte; an extensively modified natural mound, rising 12 metres (39 ft) from the bottom of the ditch to the platform, which is around 80 by 40 metres (260 by 130 ft) across. This is surrounded by a system of banks, ditches, dams and sluices which held water until drained in 1823. The remains of buildings on the platform include a 2-metre (6 ft 7 in) thick curtain wall, and the foundations of a church. The latter was in use as the parish church as late as the 17th century. In the Second World War an observation post was built on the Doune.
