= Lord Erskine =

The Lordship of Parliament of Erskine (Lord Erskine) was created around 1426 for Sir Robert Erskine. The sixth lord was created Earl of Mar in 1565, with which title (and the earldom of Kellie) the lordship then merged.

== Lords Erskine (c. 1426) ==
- Robert Erskine, 1st Lord Erskine (d. 1453)
- Thomas Erskine, 2nd Lord Erskine (d. c.1491)
- Alexander Erskine, 3rd Lord Erskine (d. c.1509)
- Robert Erskine, 4th Lord Erskine (d. 1513)
- John Erskine, 5th Lord Erskine (d. 1552)
- John Erskine, 6th Lord Erskine (d. 1572): became Earl of Mar in 1565
- For further lords see Earl of Mar (first, and seventh, creations) and Earl of Kellie.

== See also ==
- Thomas Erskine, 1st Baron Erskine (d. 1832) (a younger son of Henry Erskine, 10th Earl of Buchan), who became Baron Erskine when he was appointed Lord Chancellor. This title was separate from that of the Earls of Buchan until 1960.
