= Dundas baronets of Beechwood (1821) =

Escutcheon of the Dundas baronets of Beechwood

The Dundas baronetcy, of Beechwood in the County of Midlothian, was created in the Baronetage of the United Kingdom on 24 August 1821 for Robert Dundas. He was succeeded by his son David, the 2nd Baronet; three of his six sons, the 3rd, 4th and 5th Baronets, all succeeded in the title. The last was succeeded by his son, the 6h Baronet. He was childless and on his death in 1981 at the age of 99, the title became extinct.

== Dundas baronets, of Beechwood (1821) ==
- Sir Robert Dundas, 1st Baronet (1761–1835)
- Sir David Dundas, 2nd Baronet (1803–1877)
- Sir Sydenham James Dundas, 3rd Baronet (1849–1904)
- Sir Charles Henry Dundas, 4th Baronet (1851–1908)
- Sir George Whyte Melville Dundas, 5th Baronet (1856–1934)
- Sir Robert Whyte-Melville Dundas, 6th Baronet (1881–1981)

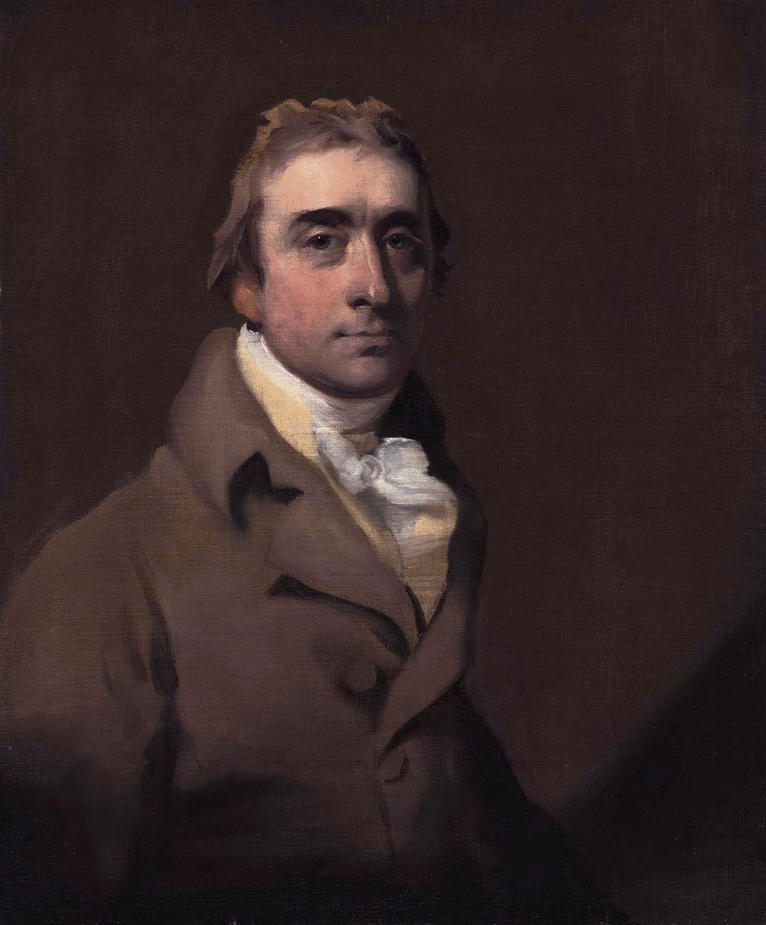
Sir Robert Dundas, 1st Baronet, of Beechwood (1761–1825)

== Notes ==
Baronetage of the United Kingdom
Preceded by Eardley-Wilmot baronets	Dundas baronets of Beechwood; 24 August 1821	Succeeded by Carmichael-Smyth baronets
