= Alexander Erskine of Cambo =

Scottish baronet

Sir Alexander Erskine of Cambo, 2nd Baronet (1663 – 1729) of Cambo, Fife was a Scottish baronet and Lord Lyon, King of Arms.

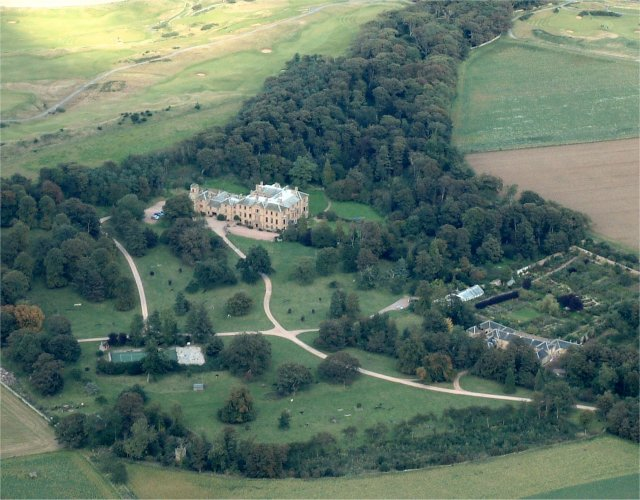
Cambo Estate, Fife

== Life ==
Erskine was the son of Sir Charles Erskine of Cambo, 1st Bt. and Penelope Barclay. He was born in the same year that his father had been created Lord Lyon, the principal Officer of Arms in the Kingdom of Scotland. By an act of the Parliament of Scotland on 12 June 1672 he was created joint Lyon with his father and in this capacity helped his father establish the Lyon Register.

He inherited the baronetcy and the Cambo Estate in Fife on his father's death in 1677. He was crowned officially as sole Lord Lyon at Holyrood Palace on 27 July 1681 by the then Lord High Commissioner to the Parliament of Scotland, the Duke of Albany and York. In 1711 Erskine was joint Keeper of the Signet with his cousin, John Erskine, Earl of Mar, and from 1710 until 1713 was Member of Parliament for Fifeshire

During the 1715 Jacobite uprising, Erskine was briefly imprisoned at Edinburgh Castle prior to the Battle of Sheriffmuir, however he was soon released and retained his offices until his death in 1729.

== Marriage and issue ==
Erskine of Cambo married his cousin Anne, daughter to Alexander Erskine, 3rd Earl of Kellie, and had issue:

- Charles Erskine (born 1682-died in infancy)
- Penelope Erskine (1682-1768)
- Alexander Erskine (b. 1686-d. c.1715)
- Sir Charles Erskine of Cambo, 3rd Bt. (1687-1753)
- Sir John Erskine of Cambo, 4th Bt. (1690-1754)
- Anna Erskine (b.1692)
- Sir William Erskine of Cambo, 5th Bt. (1695-1781)
- Sir David Erskine (b. c.1695-1769)
- Sophia Erskine (1698-1735)
- Thomas Erskine (1699-1783)
- Colin Erskine, father to Charles Erskine (cardinal)

== Arms ==
Coat of arms of Alexander Erskine of Cambo
Escutcheon Quarterly, 1st and 4th, gules an imperial crown within a double tressure flory counterflory or, a coat of augmentation, 2nd and 3rd, argent a pale sable.

Parliament of Great Britain
Preceded by Sir Robert Anstruther, 1st Bt	Member of Parliament for Fife; 1710–1715	Succeeded by Sir John Anstruther, 1st Bt
Baronetage of Nova Scotia
Preceded by Charles Erskine	Baronet (of Cambo); 1677–1729	Succeeded by Charles Erskine
