= Royal Bachelors' Club =

Swedish gentlemen's club

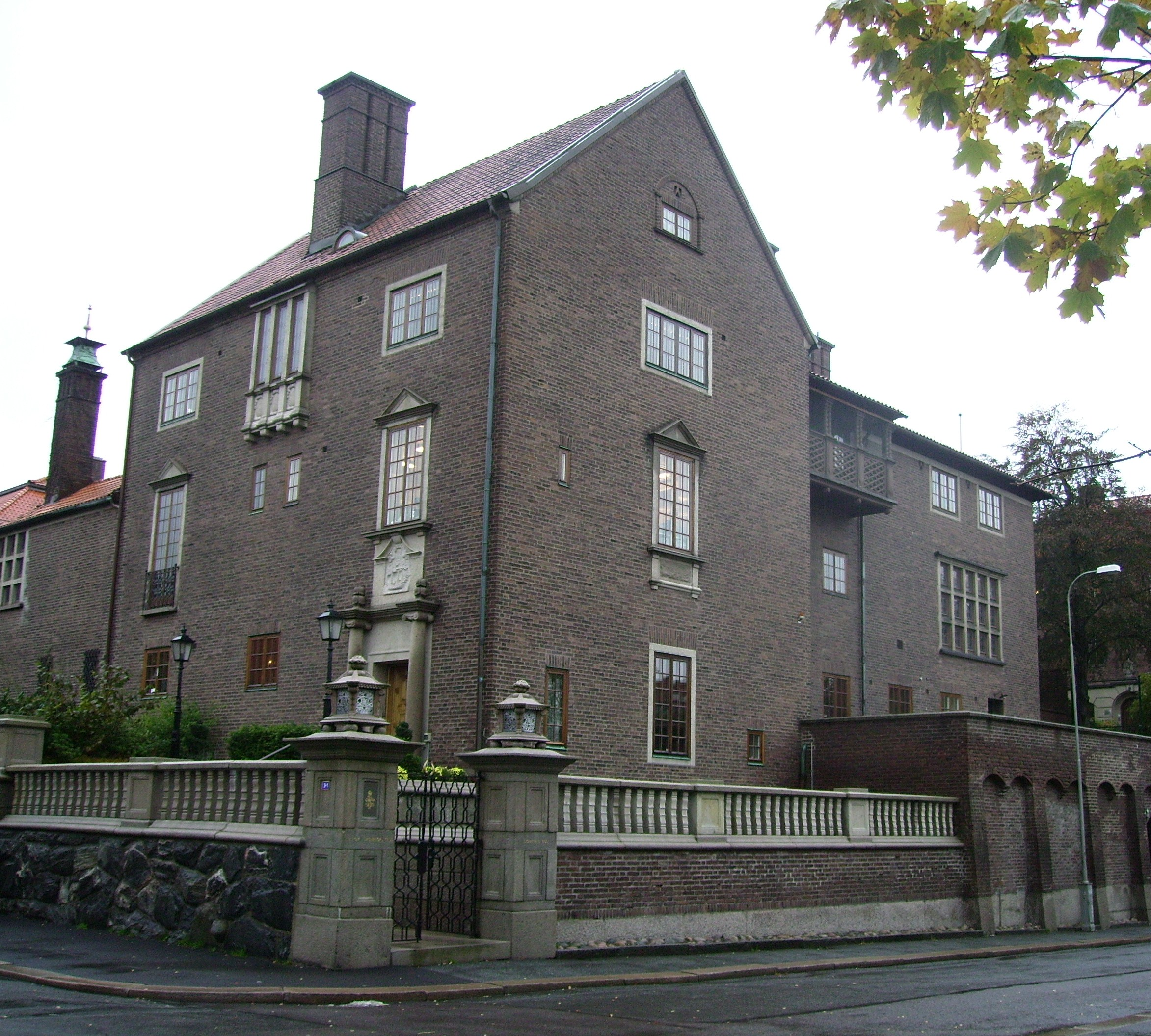
Royal Bachelor's Club at Skyttegatan 1 in Gothenburg.

The Royal Bachelors' Club is a gentlemen's club founded in 1769 in Gothenburg, Sweden. In 1787, the club got royal appropriation and exists still today.

It was founded by Scottish expats who had settled in the city, including Thomas Erskine, a Jacobite who became the British Consul in Gothenburg and later became the 8th Earl Kellie. Many expats were interested in billiards, which was banned in Sweden at the time on public premises. Many were fairly young men who had no private homes to play in; they founded the Bachelors’ Club, for "billiards, and pleasant, undisturbed fellowship". Erskine was Member Number 1.
