= James Erskine, Earl of Mar and Kellie =

British peer (born 1949)

The Right Honourable The Earl of Mar and Kellie DL

Member of the House of Lords
- Lord Temporal
- Hereditary peerage 23 December 1993 – 11 November 1999
- Preceded by: The 12th Earl of Mar
- Succeeded by: Seat abolished
- Life peerage 19 April 2000 – 30 June 2017

Personal details
- Born: 10 March 1949 (age 77)
- Party: Liberal Democrat

James Thorne Erskine, 14th Earl of Mar and 16th Earl of Kellie, Baron Erskine of Alloa Tower, DL (born 10 March 1949) is a Scottish peer and former Liberal Democrat member of the House of Lords.

Educated at Eton, he was Page of Honour to Queen Elizabeth II in 1962 and 1963. He proceeded to Moray House College of Education, Edinburgh, before embarking on a career in social work with various Scottish local authorities. He has also worked as a boatbuilder, and has served with the Royal Auxiliary Air Force and Royal Naval Auxiliary Service.

Having succeeded to the titles the previous year, the earl took his seat in the House of Lords in 1994, choosing to sit on the Liberal Democrat benches. He lost his seat after the passage of the House of Lords Act 1999. However, on 19 April 2000, he was created a life peer as Baron Erskine of Alloa Tower, of Alloa in the County of Clackmannanshire, enabling him to return to the House. He was the Liberal Democrat candidate for the constituency of Ochil in the 1999 Scottish Parliament election, but was not elected. He retired from the House of Lords on 30 June 2017.

As the 16th Viscount Fentoun, he is Premier Viscount in the Peerage of Scotland. He is also Chief of the Name and Arms of Erskine. Since 1991, he has been a Deputy Lieutenant of Clackmannanshire.

Owing to a dispute in the nineteenth century, there is another Earldom of Mar, held by Margaret Alison of Mar, 31st Countess of Mar. Precedence as determined by the Decreet of Ranking is Countess of Mar, 4th (created 1404) and Earl of Mar and Kellie, 10th (created 1619).

As the Earl of Mar does not have any children, his heir presumptive is his younger brother the Hon. Alexander David Erskine.

Peerage of Scotland
Preceded by James Francis Hervey Erskine	Earl of Mar; 1993–present	Incumbent
Preceded by James Francis Hervey Erskine	Earl of Kellie; 1993–present	Incumbent
