= John Stewart, Earl of Mar (died 1479) =

Son of James II of Scotland

John Stewart
- Earl of Mar
- The arms of John Stewart, Earl of Mar
- Born: c. 1457; Stirling Castle, Scotland
- Died: 1479 (aged c. 22); Canongate, Edinburgh, Scotland
- House: Stewart
- Father: James II of Scotland
- Mother: Mary of Guelders

John Stewart (c. 1457 - 1479) was a Scottish prince. The third surviving son of King James II and his wife, Mary of Guelders, he held the title of Earl of Mar. John died under mysterious circumstances in Edinburgh, probably on the orders of his eldest brother, King James III.

== Life ==
John was born at Stirling Castle, probably in 1457. He was the fourth son of James II of Scotland. John received the title of Earl of Mar before 23 June 1459, after a dispute between the king's lawyers and Thomas, Lord Erskine, over possession of the earldom. James II was killed by an exploding cannon in 1460, after which John's eldest brother, James III, became King of Scots.

Little is known about John's life; the historian Gordon Donaldson called him "no more than a name". In 1463 his household was transferred from Stirling to Falkland Palace. John's potential marriage was discussed by the Scottish parliament in 1466. John was tutored at Doune Castle in adolescence, and received control over his estates in 1471. John played a minor role in politics as an adult, attending meetings of parliament in 1476 and 1479. He frequently spent time in Aberdeen, owning a town house in the burgh, and was apparently involved in local disputes. John obtained royal letters in 1476 commanding the residents of Aberdeen to support him in his "feuds".

John fell under the suspicion of his brother, James III, after attending parliament in Edinburgh in March 1479. John was arrested later that year, and may have been imprisoned at Craigmillar Castle on the king's orders. John's imprisonment may have been related to the downfall of his elder brother, Alexander, Duke of Albany, earlier that same year. Two contemporary chronicles claimed that John was arrested for witchcraft, having been associated with several supposed witches. John was convicted in a trial at Craigmillar, and then taken to a house in the Canongate of Edinburgh, presumably to serve his sentence. However, he died at this house soon afterwards, possibly in December 1479. According to John Lesley and other later historians, John was killed in his bathtub, traditionally while receiving the contemporary medical treatment of bloodletting.

John never married, and left no known issue.

== Ancestry ==
Ancestors of John Stewart, Earl of Mar (died 1479)

16. Robert II of Scotland
8. Robert III of Scotland
17. Elizabeth Mure
4. James I of Scotland
18. John Drummond of Lennox
9. Anabella Drummond
19. Mary Montifex
2. James II of Scotland
20. John of Gaunt
10. John Beaufort, 1st Earl of Somerset
21. Katherine de Roet
5. Joan Beaufort
22. Thomas Holland of Kent
11. Margaret Holland
23. Alice FitzAlan
1. John Stewart, Earl of Mar
24. Arnold I of Egmond
12. John II of Egmond
25. Jolanthe of Leiningen
6. Arnold, Duke of Gelderland
26. John XII of Arkel
13. Maria van Arkel
27. Joanna of Jülich
3. Mary of Guelders
28. Adolph III of Mark
14. Adolph I, Duke of Cleves
29. Margaret of Julich
7. Catherine of Cleves
30. John the Fearless
15. Mary of Burgundy
31. Margaret of Bavaria

== Sources ==
- Macdougall, Norman (2009). James III (Reprinted ed.). John Donald. ISBN 978 1 904607 87 8.
- McGladdery, Christine (2015). James II (Revised ed.). Edinburgh: John Donald. ISBN 978 1 904607 89 2.
- Nicholson, Ranald (1974). Scotland: The Later Middle Ages (Second ed.). Edinburgh: Mercat Press. ISBN 0901824 844.
- Penman, Michael (2017). The Kings and Queens of Scotland (Reprinted ed.). The History Press. ISBN 978 0 7524 3814 6.
- Weir, Alison (1996). Britain's Royal Families: The Complete Genealogy. Pimlico. ISBN 0712674 489.
- Macdougall, Norman (2004). "Stewart, John, earl of Mar and Garioch". Oxford Dictionary of National Biography (online ed.). Oxford University Press. doi:10.1093/ref:odnb/26484. (Subscription, Wikipedia Library access or UK public library membership required.) (subscription required)
