= Walter Erskine, Earl of Mar and Kellie (1839–1888) =

Scottish peer

Walter Henry Erskine, Earl of Mar and of Kellie (17 December 1839 – 16 September 1888) was a Scottish peer.

== Biography ==
Walter Henry was the son of Walter Coningsby Erskine, 12th Earl of Kellie and Elise Youngson. He succeeded as 13th Earl of Kellie on his father's death in 1872. Coningsby Erskine had pursued a claim for succession to the earldom of Mar which was unresolved on his death, but this claim was recognized in 1875 making Walter Henry the Earl of Mar also. However, this was modified in 1885 by a special act of Parliament, the Earldom of Mar Restitution Act 1885, limiting the claim to the seventh creation of the title, leaving Walter the 11th Earl of Mar concurrently with John Goodeve-Erskine, who was 27th Earl of Mar in its first creation. There have thereafter been two earls of Mar at any one time.

He was a Freemason and the Grand Master of the Grand Lodge of Scotland from 1882 to 1885.

On 14 October 1853, he married Mary Anne Forbes (1838–22 May 1927), daughter of William Forbes. They had nine children.

- Walter John Francis Erskine, 12th Earl of Mar and 14th Earl of Kellie (1865–1955)
- Elyne Mary Erskine (1866–1891)
- Constance Elise Erskine (1869–1959)
- Rt. Hon. Sir William Augustus Forbes Erskine (1871–1952)
- Mary Erskine (1872–1873)
- Louisa Frances Erskine (b. 1875)
- Frances Elizabeth Erskine (b. 1877)
- Alice Maud Mary Erskine (b. 1878)
- Alexander Penrose Forbes Erskine (1881–1925)

Masonic offices
Preceded by Sir Michael Shaw-Stewart, Bt.	Grand Master of the Grand Lodge of Scotland; 1882–1885	Succeeded by Archibald Campbell
Peerage of Scotland
Preceded by de jure Walter Erskine	Earl of Mar; 1875–1888	Succeeded by Walter Erskine
Preceded by Walter Erskine	Earl of Kellie; 1872–1888	Succeeded by Walter Erskine
