= James of Mar, 30th Earl of Mar =

Scottish noble (1914–1975)

The Right Honourable The Earl of Mar
- The Earl of Mar in 1968

Member of the House of Lords
- In office 11 September 1965 – 21 April 1975; Hereditary Peerage
- Preceded by: Lionel Erskine-Young
- Succeeded by: Margaret of Mar

Personal details
- Born: James Clifton Lane; 22 November 1914
- Died: 21 April 1975 (aged 60)
- Spouses: Millicent Salton (m. 1939; div. 1958) Marjorie Miller (m. 1960)
- Children: Margaret of Mar, 31st Countess of Mar; David of Mar, Lord Garioch; Lady Janet of Mar

James Clifton of Mar, 30th Earl of Mar (22 November 1914 – 21 April 1975) was a British peer.

He was born James Clifton Lane, and was officially recognized in the style of Mar by warrant of the Lord Lyon in 1959 on being recognised as the heir presumptive of Lionel Erskine-Young, 29th Earl of Mar, his first cousin once removed (both he and the 29th Earl were descended from a sister of John Goodeve-Erskine, 27th Earl of Mar), and from then on was known as the Master of Mar, until he succeeded as 30th Earl in 1965.

His only son, David, Master of Mar, Lord Garioch, died in 1967, and when Lord Mar died in 1975 he was succeeded by his elder daughter, Margaret of Mar, Mistress of Mar.

== Family ==
He married, firstly, Millicent Mary Salton, daughter of William Salton, on 1 March 1939 and had one son and two daughters:

- Margaret of Mar, 31st Countess of Mar (born 1940)
- David Charles of Mar, Lord Garioch (1944–1967)
- Lady Janet of Mar (born 1946)

He and Millicent Mary Salton were divorced in 1958.

He married, secondly, Marjorie Aileen Miller, daughter of John Reginald Miller, in 1960.

Peerage of the United Kingdom
Preceded by Lionel Erskine-Young	Earl of Mar; 1965–1975	Succeeded by Margaret of Mar
