= John Stewart, Earl of Mar (died 1503) =

15th-/16th-century Scottish earl

John Stewart
- Earl of Mar
- The arms of John Stewart, Earl of Mar
- Born: c. December 1479; Dunfermline Palace, Scotland
- Died: 11 March 1503 (aged c. 24); Scotland
- House: Stewart
- Father: James III of Scotland
- Mother: Margaret of Denmark

John Stewart (c. December 1479 – 11 March 1503) was a Scottish prince. He was the youngest son of King James III and his wife, Margaret of Denmark. John held the title of Earl of Mar. Very little is known about his life.

== Life ==
John was probably born late in 1479. He was certainly alive by the summer of 1480. The third and youngest son of James III of Scotland, John was traditionally born at Dunfermline Palace. He was probably resident at Stirling Castle in 1482, alongside his mother, Margaret of Denmark, and his two elder brothers, who were both named James. John seems to have been kept at Stirling during much of his childhood. John's mother died in the castle in 1486. His father was killed at the Battle of Sauchieburn in 1488, after which his eldest brother, James IV, became King of Scots.

John's father granted him the title of Earl of Mar on 2 March 1486. In 1490, the Scottish parliament complained that some of the rents due to John from his estates were not being collected. Alexander Home, a prominent courtier who had become keeper of Stirling Castle, was made John's guardian around the same time. The remainder of John's life is very obscure. Unlike his elder brother, James, Duke of Ross, he did not play any noticeable role in politics. The parliament of 1496 discussed disputes in Mar without reference to John, who apparently did not attend.

John died on 11 March 1503. After his death, the earldom of Mar passed to his eldest brother, James IV, who granted most of its estates to his courtier, Alexander Elphinstone.

== Ancestry ==
Ancestors of John Stewart, Earl of Mar (died 1503)

16. Robert III of Scotland
8. James I of Scotland
17. Anabella Drummond
4. James II of Scotland
18. John Beaufort, 1st Earl of Somerset
9. Joan Beaufort
19. Margaret Holland
2. James III of Scotland
20. John II of Egmond
10. Arnold, Duke of Gelderland
21. Maria van Arkel
5. Mary of Guelders
22. Adolph I, Duke of Cleves
11. Catherine of Cleves, Duchess of Guelders
23. Mary of Burgundy
1. John Stewart, Earl of Mar
24. Christian V, Count of Oldenburg
12. Dietrich, Count of Oldenburg
25. Agnes of Hohnstein-Heringen
6. Christian I of Denmark
26. Gerhard VI, Count of Holstein-Rendsburg
13. Hedvig of Holstein
27. Catherine Elisabeth of Brunswick-Lüneburg
3. Margaret of Denmark
28. Frederick I, Elector of Brandenburg
14. John, Margrave of Brandenburg-Kulmbach
29. Elisabeth of Bavaria
7. Dorothea of Brandenburg
30. Rudolf III, Duke of Saxe-Wittenberg
15. Barbara of Saxe-Wittenberg
31. Barbara of Legnica
