= Thomas Erskine, 9th Earl of Kellie =

Scottish merchant, landowner and politician

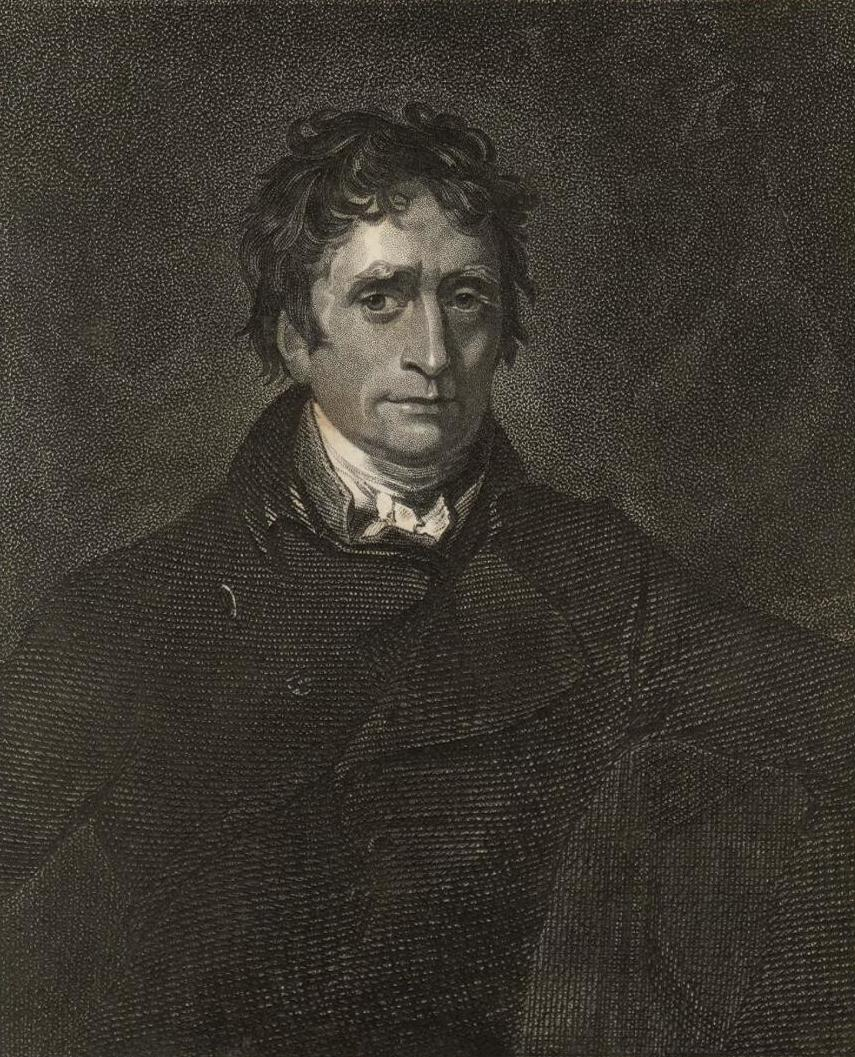
Thomas Erskine, 9th Earl of Kellie

Thomas Erskine, 9th Earl of Kellie (about 1746 – 6 February 1828) was a Scottish merchant, landowner and politician who for many years lived in the Swedish port city of Gothenburg. He returned to Scotland in 1799 when he inherited an earldom from his nephew Charles Erskine, 8th Earl Kellie, and thus, became the 9th Earl of Kellie.

== Biography ==
Erskine was born in Scotland to an aristocratic family that had become comparatively impoverished because of confiscations due to their support for the Stuart pretenders. He was probably born at Cambo House in Fife, one of the forfeited properties.

=== Gothenburg ===
At a young age, he was sent to Gothenburg to learn a trade. He was employed in 1759 in the office of George Carnegie, a Jacobite exile who had established himself as a merchant there. After a few years, he transferred to the firm of the iron-exporting English brothers John and Benjamin Hall, and became a partner in the firm in 1767. In his 30 years as a partner, he managed to amass a large fortune. In addition to retaining his partnership in the firm of the Hall brothers, Erskine pursued business under his own name, later partnering with David Mitchell from Montrose, who took over Thomas Erskine & Co. as sole owner after Erskine's departure for Scotland.

In 1775 Erskine was appointed British consul for Gothenburg, Marstrand, and the other port cities on the West Coast of Sweden. As such, he wrote regular reports to the British government, including reports on the Swedish contraband trade with France during the revolutionary wars. This position also enhanced his social position in Gothenburg. He was one of the 20 (at the time unmarried and for the largest part British-born) founding members of the Royal Bachelors' Club, an English-type gentlemen's club established in 1769 mainly in order to circumvent a ban on the playing of billiards at public establishments.

=== Return to Scotland ===
Erskine bought back Cambo House in 1790. He spent the winter of 1793–94 in Scotland, but returned to Gothenburg, where he remained as consul and continued his business until 1799. In that year he inherited the Earldom of Kellie from his nephew Charles Erskine. His definite departure for Scotland was troubled by a conflict with the Gothenburg City Council, which demanded that he pay a sixth of his fortune before leaving Sweden.

As Earl of Kellie, Erskine was elected a representative Scottish peer in the British House of Lords in 1804, was re-elected in 1807, and remained such until his death. In 1824, he succeeded the Earl of Morton as Lord Lieutenant of Fife.

== Marriage and family ==
In 1771 Thomas Erskine wed Anne Gordon, a daughter of Captain Adam Gordon of Ardoch. The marriage was childless, but Erskine's daughter born out of wedlock, Harriet (born in 1763), married Johan Henrik Engelhart, professor of medicine at Lund. Four of Harriet's children were raised in their grandfather's house in Scotland. While the earldom was inherited by Erskine's brother Methven, a new Erskine Baronetcy was granted in 1820 to the 9th Earl's grandson, David Engelhart, who changed his name to Erskine and on whom Thomas Erskine entailed the estate of Cambo. David's sister, Harriet Engelhart, married a first cousin, another David Erskine (a grand nephew of the 9th Earl of Kellie and the natural son of Sir David Erskine) who settled as a merchant in Stockholm.

== Notes ==
Peerage of Scotland
| Preceded by Charles Erskine | Earl of Kellie; 1799–1828 | Succeeded by Methven Erskine |
