= Erskine baronets =

Set index for Erskine baronets

There have been five baronetcies of the United Kingdom created for a person with the surname Erskine, two in the Baronetage of Nova Scotia, one in the Baronetage of Great Britain and two in the Baronetage of the United Kingdom. Two of the creations are extant as of 2026.

- Erskine baronets of Alva (1666)
- Erskine baronets of Cambo (first creation, 1666)
- Erskine baronets of Torrie (1791)
- Erskine baronets of Cambo (second creation, 1821)
- Erskine baronets of Rerrick (1961): see Baron Erskine of Rerrick
