= Charles Erskine, Earl of Mar =

Scottish nobleman; raised the Royal Scots Fusiliers

Charles Erskine, Earl of Mar (19 October 1650 – 23 May 1689) was a Scottish nobleman. He is regarded as both the 22nd earl (in the 1st creation) and the 5th earl (in the 7th).

He raised the 21st Regiment of Foot, or Royal Scots Fusiliers, in 1679, and became its first colonel. However, he was arrested shortly before his death.

On 2 April 1674, he married Mary Maule, daughter of George Maule, 2nd Earl of Panmure. Their son John Erskine succeeded to the title.

Military offices
New regiment	Colonel of the Scots Fuzileers; 1678–1686	Succeeded by Thomas Buchan
Peerage of Scotland
Preceded by John Erskine	Earl of Mar; 1668–1689	Succeeded by John Erskine
