= Alexander Erskine, 5th Earl of Kellie =

Sir Alexander Erskine (died 3 April 1756) was the 5th Earl of Kellie.

== Family ==
He was the son of Alexander Erskine, 4th Earl of Kellie and Anne Lindsay.

He married first on 29 May 1726 in Carnbee, Fife, Scotland to Louisa Moray, daughter of William Moray.

He married secondly on 12 Oct 1731 to Janet Pitcairn.

His daughter Janet married Sir Robert Anstruther, 3rd Baronet of Balcaskie.

His son and heir Thomas was a gifted composer.

Peerage of Scotland
Preceded by Alexander Erskine	Earl of Kellie; 1710–1756	Succeeded by Thomas Erskine
