= John Erskine, Earl of Mar (1741–1825) =

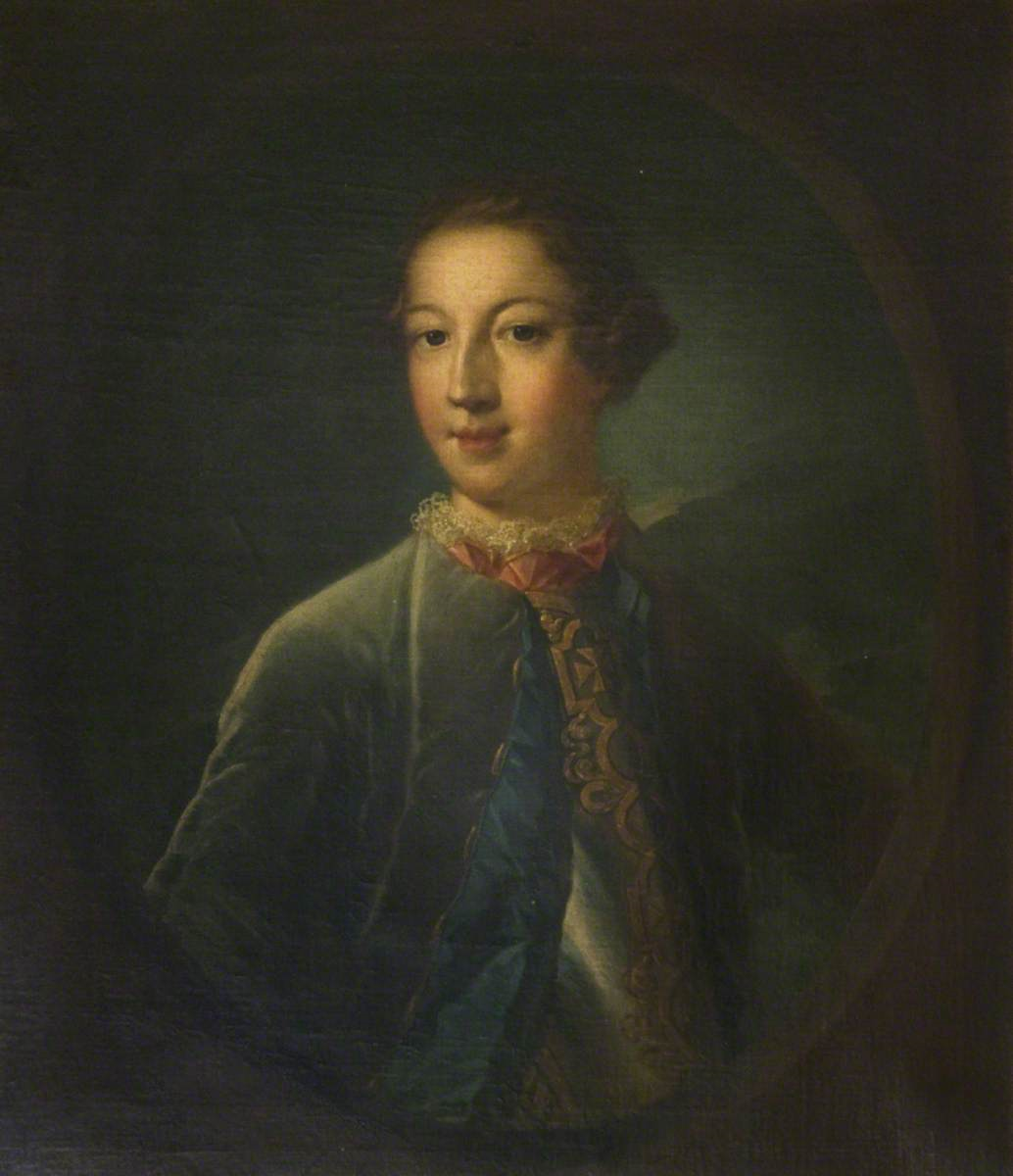
Portrait of John Francis, Earl of Mar, Aged 17, painted by Allan Ramsay.

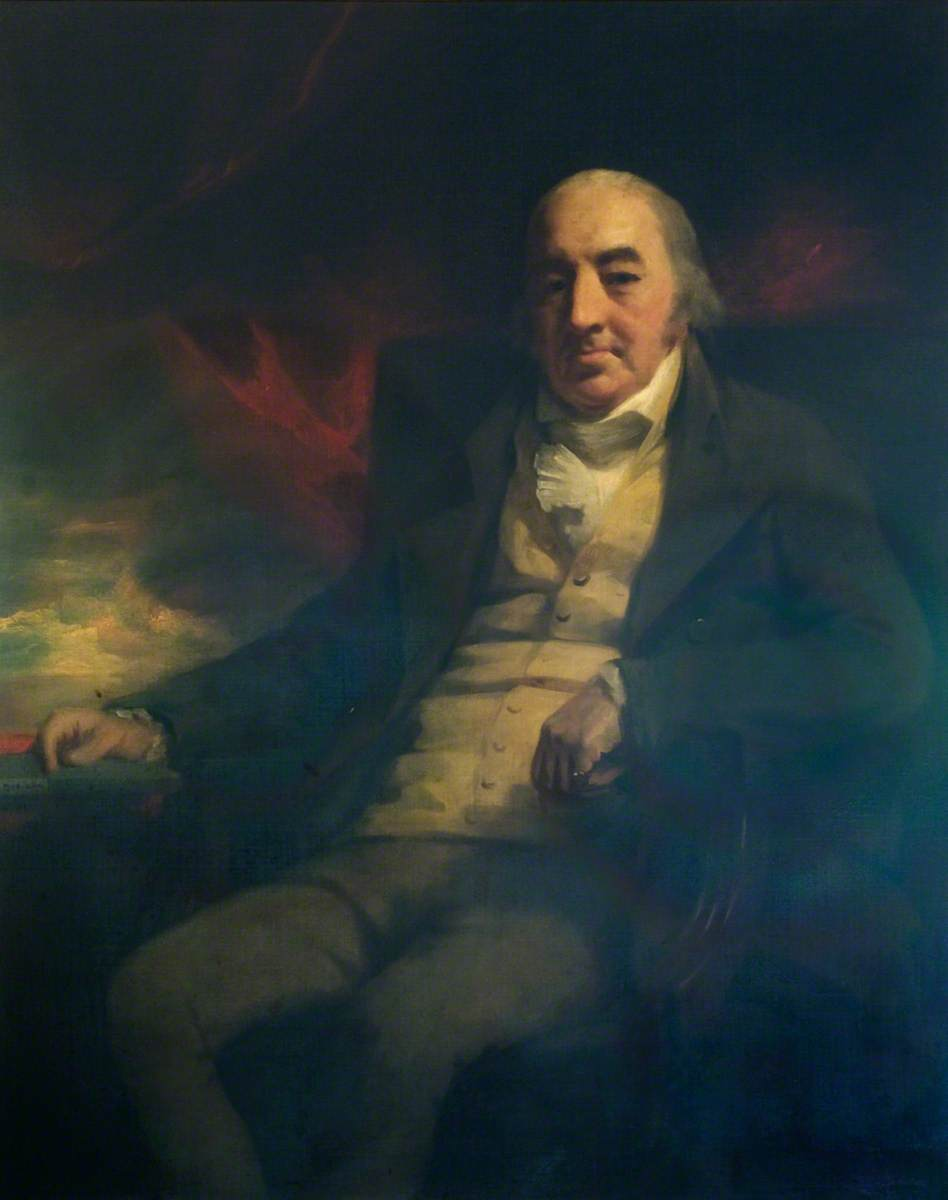
Portrait of John Francis Erskine, Earl of Mar, painted by Henry Raeburn.

John Francis Erskine, Earl of Mar (1741 – 1825) was restored by act of Parliament to the title of Earl of Mar in June 1824, his 83rd year. The title had previously been forfeit, following the attainting of his predecessor, John Erskine in 1716 for having Jacobite sympathies. He died in August 1825.

John Francis Erskine is reckoned to be both the 24th earl in the first creation of the title, and seventh earl (in the seventh creation), due to the confusion following a nineteenth-century dispute over the succession after his grandson's death.

Peerage of Scotland
Preceded by John Erskine (attainted)	Earl of Mar; 1824–1825 (restored)	Succeeded by John Thomas Erskine
