= Thomas Erskine, 2nd Lord Erskine =

Thomas Erskine, 2nd Lord Erskine (died 1494), was a Scottish peer.

Thomas Erskine was the son of Robert Erskine, 1st Lord Erskine, and Elizabeth, daughter of David Lindsay, 1st Earl of Crawford. On 12 June 1448, James II of Scotland made Lord Erskine and Sir Thomas Erskine keepers of Dumbarton Castle. Thomas Erskine was granted many of his father's lands in September 1448.

Thomas, Lord Erskine, died in 1494 and was succeeded, as 3rd Lord Erskine, by his son, Alexander (died 1509) who married Christian Crichton the daughter of Sir Robert of Sanquhar by his wife, Lady Elizabeth. Their son, the 4th Lord was Robert Erskine (died 9 September 1513, Flodden) married in 1485, to Isobel Campbell, daughter of Sir George by his wife, Lady Kennedy.

The Erskine family was claimant to the earldom of Mar; this was recognized in 1565 for Thomas' descendant, John Erskine. Following a dynastic dispute in the 19th century, Thomas was acknowledged, retrospectively, as the 14th Earl.

== Marriage and children ==
Thomas Erskine had a daughter Isobel, whose mother's name is unknown, Isobel married Patrick Graham, a son of Malise Graham, 1st Earl of Menteith.

Thomas Erskine married Janet Douglas. They had several children including:

- Alexander Erskine, who was lord of the regality of Alloa by September 1492. He married Christian, a daughter of Robert Crichton of Sanquhar and widow of Robert Colville of Ochiltree. He married secondly, Ellen, a daughter of Alexander Home, 1st Lord Home and widow of Adam Hepburn of Hailes.
- Helen, who married Humphrey Colquhoun of Luss, son of Sir John Colquhoun of Luss.
- Mariota, married William Keith, 1st Earl Marischal.
- Elizabeth, married Sir Alexander (Seton) Gordon of Touch and Tullibody (the son of Alexander Gordon, 1st Earl of Huntly (died 15 July 1470) and Lady Egidia Hay - daughter of Sir John Hay, of Tullibody, and Lady Margaret Stewart, of Roulstoun).

Peerage of Scotland
Preceded by Robert Erskine	Lord Erskine; 1453–1494	Succeeded by Alexander Erskine
Preceded by Robert Erskine	de jure Earl of Mar; 1453–1494	Succeeded by Alexander Erskine
