= Alexander Erskine, 3rd Earl of Kellie =

Scottish soldier and peer

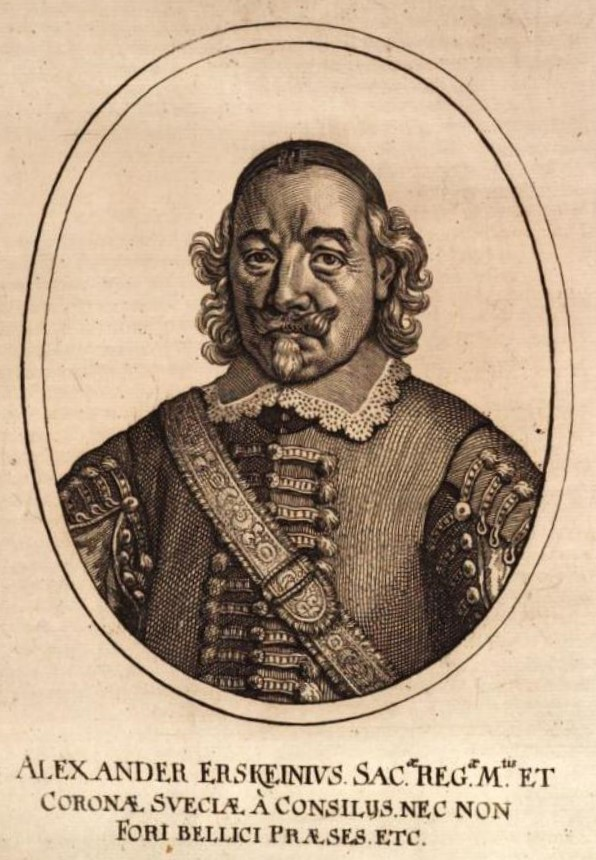
Alexander Erskine (M. Merian, Theatrum Europaeum)

Alexander Erskine, 3rd Earl of Kellie (c. 1615–1677) was a Scottish soldier and peer.

== Biography ==
Alexander Erskine inherited the title after the death of his brother Thomas in 1643.

The earl was a staunch Royalist, fighting as Colonel of Foot for Fife and Kinross and in 1648 was involved in an attempt to rescue the King. He was then sent to the Netherlands to fight for Charles II and was eventually captured at the Battle of Worcester in 1651, after which he spent many years of imprisonment. His estates were confiscated by the Commonwealth under the provisions of Cromwell's Act of Grace.

After the restoration of the monarchy in 1660 he was appointed governor of the fort and town of Ayr, lieutenant-colonel of the guards and in 1661 he became a member of the Privy Council. In 1666 he was an investigator in the case of Margaret Guthrie, an accused witch from Carnbee.

== Family ==
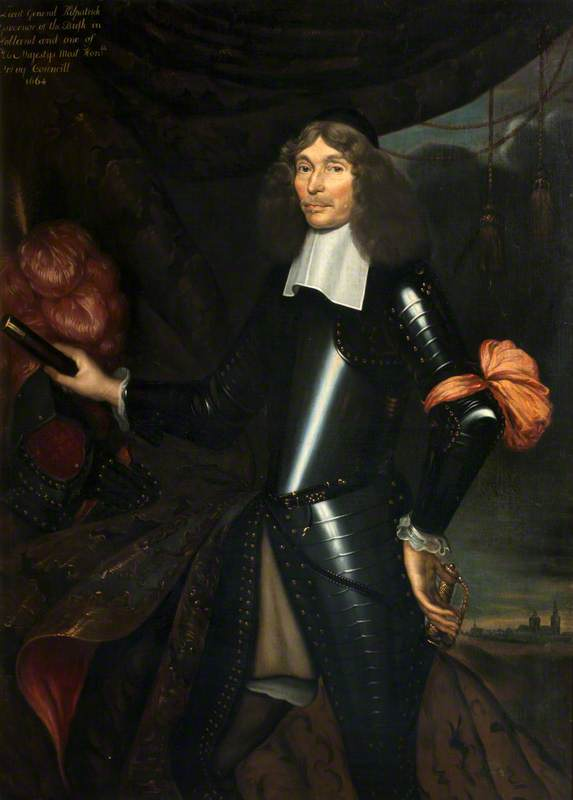
Lt.-Gen. John Kirkpatrick, Governor of Bois-le-Duc

Alexander Erskine was the son of Alexander Erskine (died 1633) and Anne Seton. He inherited the title after the death of his brother Thomas in 1643. Alexander Erskine, as the 3rd Earl of Kellie, first married in 1661 in Holland to Anna Kilpatrick, daughter of future Lt. Gen. John Kilpatrick (d. 1681), before Kilpatrick's appointment in 1670 as Governor of Bois-le-Duc, colloquially known as Den Bosch (loosely translated as the Bush), then Sergeant-Major-General of the army in 1672.

The Earl of Kellie married secondly in 1665 to Mary Dalzeil (also spelt Dalzell), daughter of Sir John Dalzeil and Agnes Nisbet. By his first wife he had a daughter Ann, who married Sir Alexander Erskine of Cambo, 2nd Baronet and had issue. By his second wife he had a son Charles (bap. 13 April 1669 Carnbee, Fife, Scotland) who died young, two daughters, Elizabeth (bap. 15 September 1673; she wed William Fraser, 5th of Inverallochy and had issue) and Mary, and a son Alexander (bap. 14 September 1677) who succeeded him as the 4th Earl of Kellie.

== Notes ==
Peerage of Scotland
Preceded by Thomas Erskine	Earl of Kellie; 1643-1677	Succeeded by Alexander Erskine
