= John Erskine, Earl of Mar (died 1572) =

Scottish noble (died 1572)

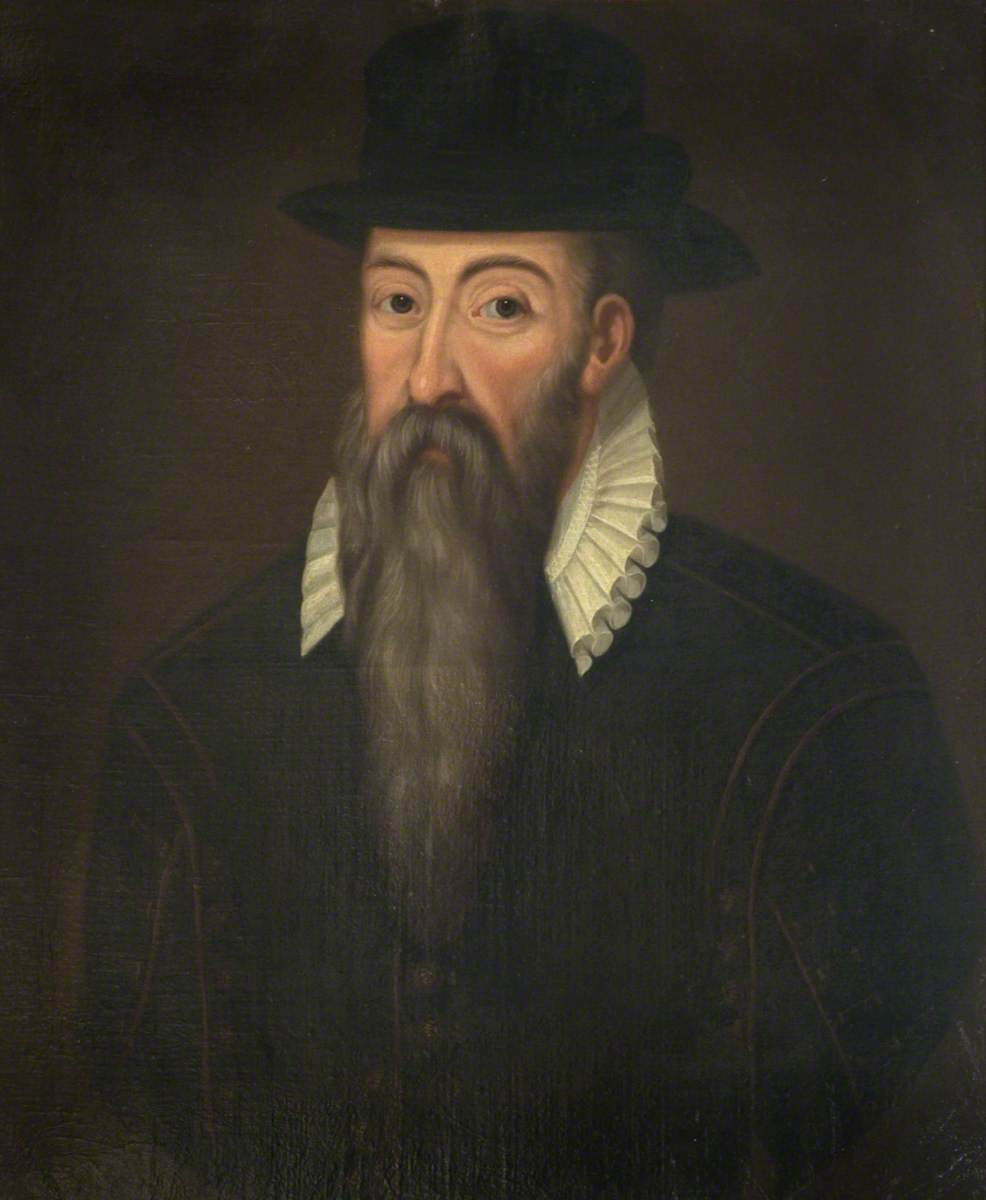
Portrait of John Erskine of Mar by John Scougal, circa 1660

John Erskine, 1st Earl of Mar (died 28 October 1572) was a Scottish aristocrat and politician. He was the custodian of the infant James VI of Scotland and Regent of Scotland.

Erskine was a son of John Erskine, 5th Lord Erskine and Lady Margaret Campbell, a daughter of Archibald Campbell, 2nd Earl of Argyll. His father was a guardian of King James V and afterwards of Mary, Queen of Scots.

== Career ==
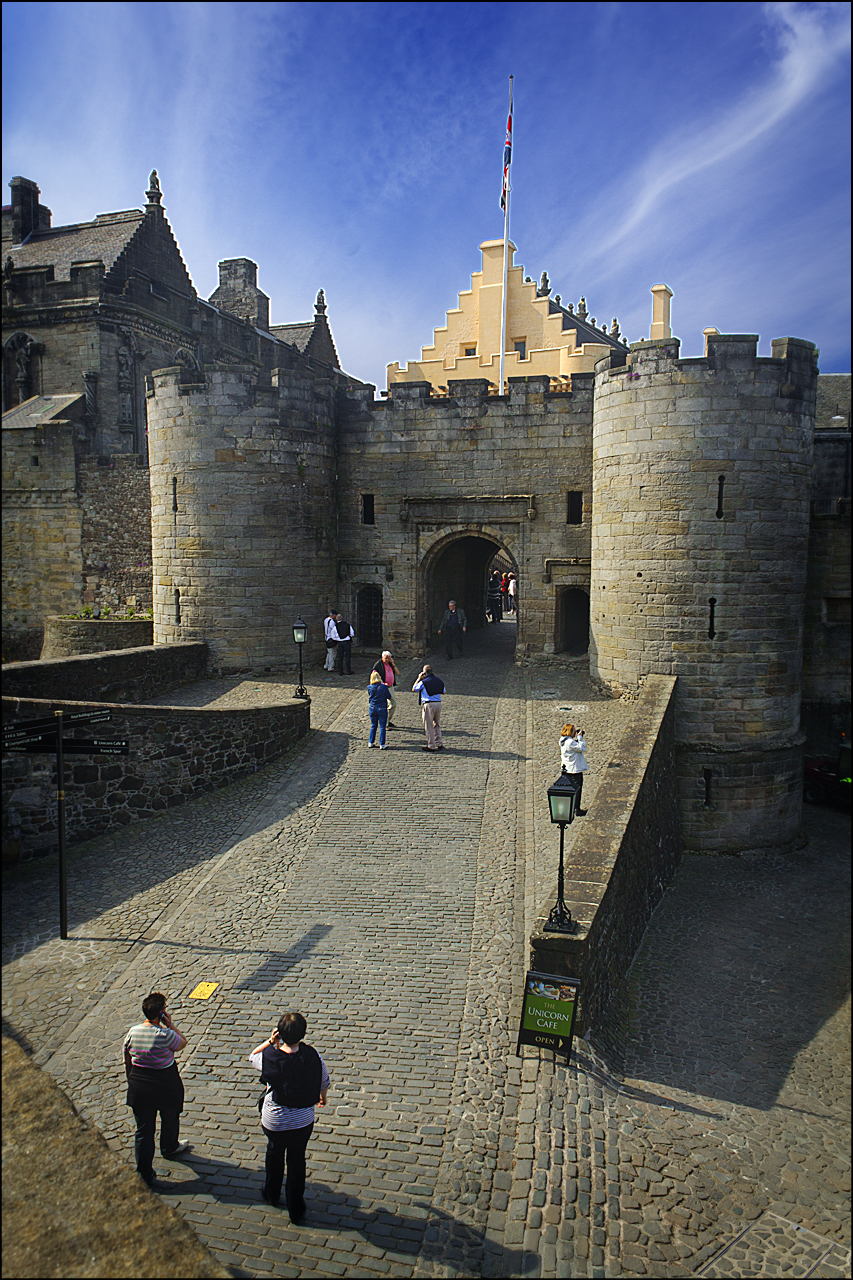
Erskine was asked to repair the fore-entry gate tower of Stirling Castle in 1568.

John was Commendator of Dryburgh Abbey from 1547, He succeeded his father as 6th Lord Erskine in 1552. Erskine joined the religious reformers in 1559 but was never very ardent in the cause. He did subscribe to the letter asking the Calvinist reformer John Knox to return to Scotland in 1557. The custody of Edinburgh Castle was in his hands during the struggle between the regent, Mary of Guise, and the Lords of the Congregation, during which he appears to have acted consistently in the interests of peace.

When Mary, Queen of Scots, returned to Scotland in 1561 Lord Erskine was a member of her council and was in favor of her marriage with Henry Stuart, Lord Darnley. His wife was Annabella Murray, daughter of William Murray of Tullibardine and sister of William Murray of Tullibardine, Comptroller of Scotland in 1563. She was a frequent companion of Queen Mary; John Knox called Annabella a "verray Jesabell".

In 1565 Erskine was granted the earldom of Mar when the queen restored the charter to him and his heirs "all and hail the said earldom of Mar". Prior to this the title of Earl of Mar was held by Mary's half-brother James Stewart. John Erskine is regarded as both the 18th earl (in the 1st creation) and the 1st earl (in the 7th). Some sources deem him the 17th Earl, still others as the 6th Earl.

Mar was made Sheriff of Stirlingshire and Keeper of Stirling Castle and the parks of Raploch and Gallowhill on 18 July 1566. In August he accompanied Queen Mary and the Earls of Bothwell and Moray on a hunting trip to Meggotland.

He became the keeper of Queen Mary's son, James, at Stirling Castle on 19 March 1567. He prevented the young prince from falling into the hands of Lord Bothwell, and when the Scottish nobles rose against Mary and Bothwell, Mar was one of their leaders. He took part in the government of Scotland when Mary was imprisoned at Lochleven Castle and abdicated. Regent Moray asked him to repair the fore-entry of Stirling Castle in December 1568. When Mary escaped from Lochleven, on 5 May 1568 Regent Moray ordered Mar to increase security at Stirling by reducing the number of retainers in the castle.

== Regent of Scotland ==
On 5 September 1571, he was chosen Regent of Scotland, but he was overshadowed and perhaps slighted by James Douglas, 4th Earl of Morton. One of Mar's first actions was to execute two prisoners, George Bell and George Calder, by having them broken on the wheel. This method of execution was said to be after the manner of France. Bell had guided the Queen's men in the raid on Stirling and Calder was thought to have shot Regent Lennox. Bell confessed, after torture, that he had shouted "Shoot the Regent!".

As the Marian Civil War continued, Mar came to Leith and made preparations to besiege Edinburgh and its castle, which was held for Queen Mary by William Kirkcaldy of Grange. He placed artillery at the Pleasance to the east of the city. The guns were brought from Dumbarton Castle, Stirling, Dundee, and Dunbar. Mar's guns were directed at first at Adam Fullerton's house, and then at the town wall. The walls were damaged but Mar gave up and returned to Leith. He sent to Queen Elizabeth I for armed support from England, following Morton's advice.

The King's cause suffered a number of reverses. At Aberdeen, the forces of Forbes family were defeated at the battle of Craibstone and Corgarff by the Marian Adam Gordon of Auchindoun. Broughty Castle near Dundee fell to the Marian Laird of Parbroath. Lord Maxwell planned to marry Elizabeth Douglas at Dalkeith but Marian forces ambushed those carrying food, silver ware, and wine to the banquet at the handfasting. Queen Elizabeth sent two ambassadors to Scotland, Thomas Randolph to speak with Regent Mar, and Henry Carey, Marshall of Berwick to the Laird of Grange in Edinburgh Castle.

Mar was in touch with William Cecil and William Drury in England, particularly by letters and messages carried by Nicolas Elphinstone. On 1 August 1572, he declared a two-month truce with the Queen's party, known as an Abstinence. He wrote in September to Margaret Douglas, Countess of Lennox about the progress of the Abstinence and the mint operated in Edinburgh Castle by his enemies. Mar assured her that her grandson, the six-year-old James VI, would soon be able to speak to her for himself. At this time he was disturbed by news that one of the jewels of Mary, Queen of Scots had been marketed in France and sold to Charles IX. Mar's last surviving letter to Cecil expressed his hopes to settle border disputes during the continued abstinence. Queen Elizabeth wrote to congratulate him on becoming Regent on 2 October and discuss the "pernicious practices" of Mary, Queen of Scots, to regain power to the prejudice of her son James VI. She urged him to punish and execute anyone implicated in the murder of Regent Lennox.

== Death ==
He died at Stirling on 29 October 1572 after a short illness, widely agreed to have been natural causes. However, some sources indicate that he may have been poisoned at the behest of the Earl of Morton. Mar's illness, according to James Melville, followed a banquet at Dalkeith Palace given by Morton. James VI continued to regard Annabella Murray with affection and wrote to her as "Minnie". She was the governess of his son Prince Henry at Stirling.

=== Architecture and material culture ===
John Erskine began building the house at Stirling called "Mar's Wark", now a ruin under the care of Historic Scotland. The other seat of the family was Alloa Tower. An inventory mentions his silver plate, table linen, and a bed with curtains of red and yellow chequered silk. The posts of the bed were made of walnut and turned (probably carved).

== Sources ==
- Stewart, Alan (2003). The cradle king: the life of James VI & I, the first monarch of a United Great Britain. New York: St. Martin's Press. ISBN 978-0-312-27488-7. OCLC 52886749.

Government offices
Preceded by The Earl of Lennox	Regent of Scotland; 1571–1572	Succeeded by The Earl of Morton
Peerage of Scotland
New creation	Earl of Mar; 1565–1572	Succeeded by John Erskine
Preceded by John Erskine	Lord Erskine; 1552–1572	Succeeded by John Erskine
