= Erskine (surname) =

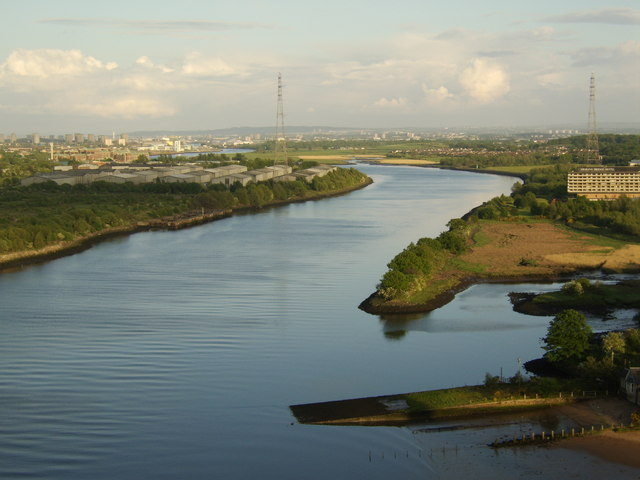
- The River Clyde seen from Erskine Bridge, 2007.

Origin
- Region of origin: Scotland

Other names
- Variant form: Arascain

Erskine is a Scottish surname. The name is derived from a habitational name from a location (Erskine) on the southern bank of the River Clyde, near Glasgow. This place was first recorded in 1225 as Erskin. Early spellings of the place include: Yrskin (1227); Ireskin (1262); Harskin (1300), and Irschen (1300). The Scottish Gaelic form of the surname is Arascain. Legend dictates that the name was given by King Malcolm II to a man who killed the Danish General Enrique at the Battle of Murthill. He is said to have shown the bloody knife to king and said eris-skyne (air a' scèin), meaning "upon the knife". The King, in honour of his valour, granted him the surname Eriskine.

== People with the surname ==
- Albert Russel Erskine (1871–1933), American businessman, president of the Studebaker Corporation
- Alexander Erskine of Gogar (died 1592), Scottish landowner given charge of the child king of Scotland, James VI, from 1572 to 1578
- Alexander Erskine, 3rd Earl of Kellie (c. 1615–1677), Scottish soldier
- Alexander Erskine of Cambo (c. 1663–1727), Lord Lyon King of Arms
- Anne Erskine (1739–1804), Scottish aristocrat, friend and trustee of Selina, Countess of Huntingdon
- Arthur Erskine (1881–1963), British soldier and courtier
- Arthur Erskine of Blackgrange (died 1571), Scottish courtier
- Barbara Erskine (born 1944), English novelist
- Carl Erskine (1926–2024), American Major League Baseball pitcher
- Charles Erskine (disambiguation)
- Chester Erskine (1905–1986), American director, producer, and writer of Broadway plays and films
- Chris Erskine (born 1987), Scottish footballer
- Claudius James Erskine (1821–1893), British Indian civil servant, judge and vice-chancellor of the University of Calcutta
- David Erskine (disambiguation)
- Deborah Erskine (born 1990 or 1991), politician from Northern Ireland
- Ebenezer Erskine (1680–1754), Scottish minister whose actions led to the establishment of the Secession Church
- Emmanuel Erskine (1937–2021), Ghanaian army general and commander of the United Nations Interim Force in Lebanon and the United Nations Truce Supervision Organization
- Gary Erskine (born 1968), Scottish comic book artist
- George Erskine (1899–1965), British general
- George Elphinstone Erskine (1841–1912), British Indian Army major general
- Gizzi Erskine (born 1979), British chef and TV personality
- Graves B. Erskine (1897–1973), United States Marine Corps general
- Henry Erskine (disambiguation)
- Ilene Erskine (1933–2018), Scottish educational psychologist, artist and printmaker.
- Jacob Erskine (born 1989), English footballer
- James Erskine (disambiguation)
- Jared Samuel Erskine (born 1986), stage name October London, American singer and songwriter
- Joe Erskine (American boxer) (1930–2009), welterweight boxer and long-distance runner
- Joe Erskine (Welsh boxer) (1934–1990), British and British Empire heavyweight boxing champion
- John Erskine (disambiguation)
- Kathryn Erskine, American 21st century writer of children's literature
- Kenneth Erskine (born 1963), British serial killer known as the "Stockwell Strangler"
- Laurie York Erskine (1894–1976), American author and educator
- Margaret Erskine (disambiguation)
- Marilyn Erskine (born 1926), American retired actress
- Mary Erskine (1629–1707), Scottish businesswoman and philanthropist
- Maya Erskine (born 1987), American actress and writer
- Peter Erskine (born 1954), American jazz drummer and composer
- Peter Erskine (artist) (born 1941), American artist
- Peter Erskine (businessman), British businessman
- Ralph Erskine (architect) (1914–2005), British-Swedish architect
- Ralph Erskine (historian) (1930–2021), Northern Ireland government lawyer and historian of wartime codebreaking
- Ralph Erskine (minister) (1685–1752), Scottish clergyman
- Randy Erskine (born 1948), American golfer
- Robert Erskine (disambiguation)
- Roy Erskine (born 1931), Scottish footballer
- Ruaraidh Erskine (1869–1960), Scottish nationalist activist
- Scott Erskine (1962–2020), American serial killer
- Thomas Erskine (disambiguation)
- Walter Erskine, Earl of Mar and Kellie (1839–1888)
- Walter Erskine, Earl of Mar and Kellie (1865–1955)
- Wendy Erskine (born 1968), Northern Irish author and teacher
- William Erskine (disambiguation)

== Fictional characters with the surname ==
- Abraham Erskine, a Marvel Comics scientist responsible for the creation of Captain America
- Inspector Lewis Erskine, protagonist of the American TV series The F.B.I.
- Harry Erskine, in the 1978 film The Manitou

== See also ==
- General Erskine (disambiguation)
- Judge Erskine (disambiguation)
- Erskine (given name)
- Lord Erskine
- Erskine baronets
- Clan Erskine
- Lord Erskine
