= Operation Anvil (Mau Mau Uprising) =

British Army's mass detention in Nairobi, Kenya

- Part of the Mau Mau Uprising
- Location: Nairobi, British Kenya
- Planned by: British Armed Forces in Kenya
- Commanded by: George Erskine
- Target: Nairobi section of the Mau Mau
- Objective: Suppression of insurgent activity
- Date: 24 April–26 May 1954
- Executed by: King's African Rifles; Kenya Police
- Outcome: British operational success; Mau Mau activity suppressed
- Casualties: 50,000+ Kenyans detained

Operation Anvil was a British military operation during the Mau Mau Uprising where British troops attempted to remove suspected Mau Mau from Nairobi and place them in Langata Camp or reserves. The operation began on 24 April 1954 and took two weeks, at the end of which 20,000 Mau Mau suspects had been taken to Langata, and 30,000 more had been deported to the reserves.

== Background ==
In the early 1950s militant nationalism emerged in the United Kingdom's colony of Kenya in East Africa. By 1952 guerrilla attacks against white settlers and indigenous moderates, perpetrated by the "Mau Mau" movement, had proliferated the region occupied by the Kikuyu. On 20 October the colonial governor declared a state of emergency, initiating efforts by the British military to put down the insurgency. The first months of the British campaign were plagued by a lack of discipline, communication, coherent strategy, and useful intelligence and little progress was made against the Mau Mau. An assault on the Naivasha police station and a massacre of civilians in the village of Lari in March 1953 dramatically escalated the conflict. Mau Mau activity also began to surface in the city of Nairobi, which had a large Kikuyu population. Many Kikuyu were sympathetic to the Mau Mau cause and provided the insurgents with supplies. They also housed them, thereby facilitating attacks in the city and the neighboring Kiambu District.

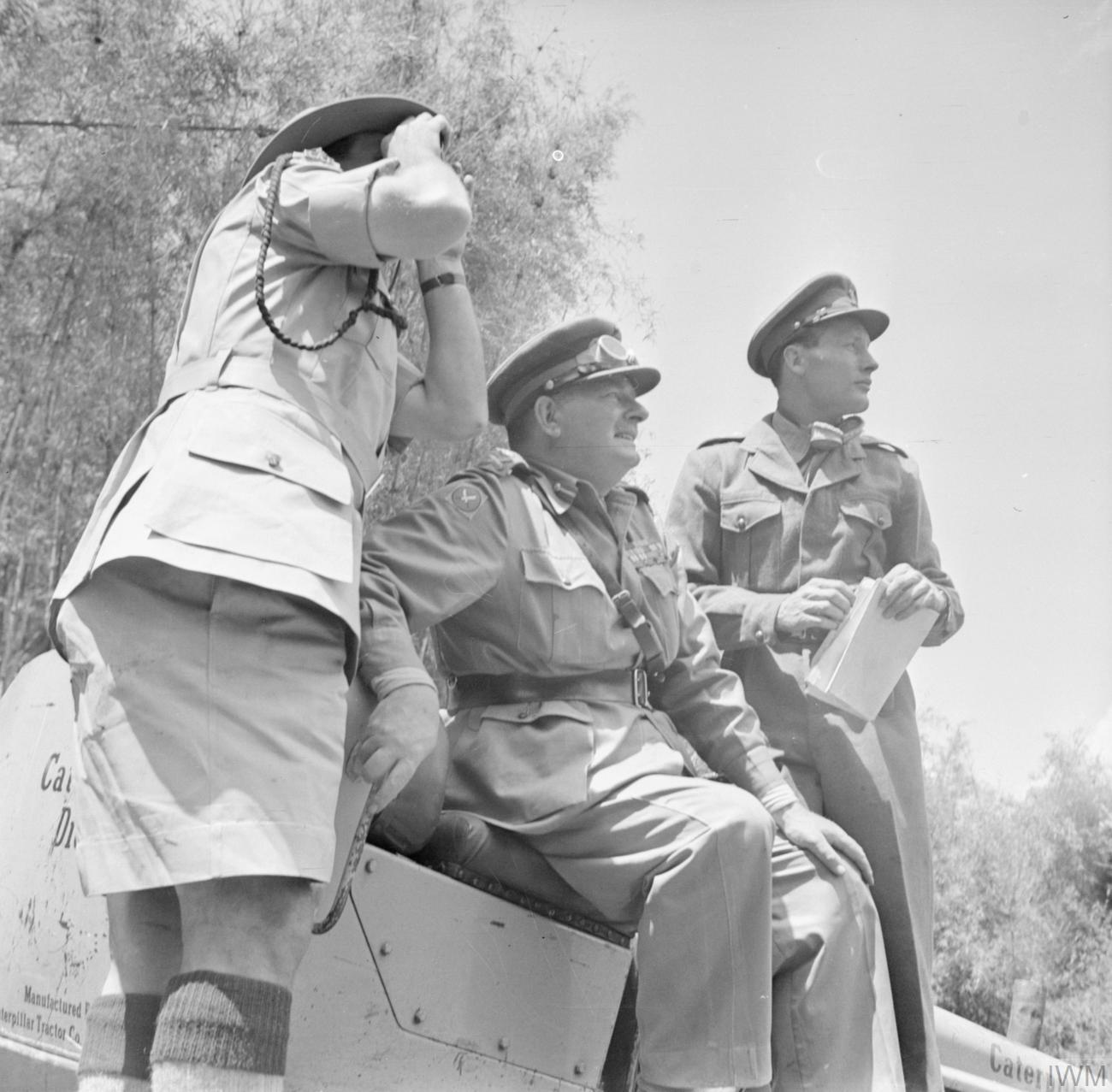
Lieutenant-General George Erskine (centre), observing operations against the Mau Mau. Erskine played a leading role in planning and carrying out Operation Anvil.

In June General George Erskine was dispatched to Kenya to assume control over British forces. He immediately began instituting reforms and organised a series of attacks against the Mau Mau. In January 1954 the British captured rebel leader Waruhiu Itote, who gave them critical information about Mau Mau deployments and strategy under interrogation. Two months later the colonial command structure was overhauled, increasing decision-making efficiency and granting Erskine greater influence in the process.

=== Prelude ===
Erskine intended on relocating all Kikuyu, Embu, and Meru people from Nairobi, but the colonial government rejected the plan, citing potential harm to the local economy and administration. The operation was based on one British security forces had conducted in Tel Aviv, Palestine. Its legality was assured by the Emergency Regulations and the Control of Nairobi Regulations of 1954, the latter of which permitted the colonial governor to issue "Evacuation Orders" to remove and detain individuals from the city so they could be screened for connections with the Mau Mau. Four battalions were earmarked for the action. In the weeks preceding the operation rumors circulated among the African population that Nairobi was due to be subjected to a security sweep. Some insurgents moved to the outskirts of the city and were thus outside the cordoned area.

== Operation ==
At 04:30 on 24 April British forces initiated Operation Anvil, sealing off every road and track leading in or out of Nairobi. Government forces then surrounded locations which were home to substantial Kikuyu populations in the city such as Makongeni, Bahati, Kariokor, Ziwani, and Pumwani, to prevent Mau Mau from escaping. Informers disguised with hoods identified suspected rebels to the authorities. Within 48 hours the British had detained 206 known insurgents. In the following weeks over 50,000 Africans were detained and questioned. Nevertheless, numerous leading figures among the rebels managed to escape from Nairobi into the countryside. The operation ended on 26 May.

== Aftermath ==
Operation Anvil marked a turning point in the British campaign against the Mau Mau. The action left the insurgents mostly isolated in the forested mountains of Nyandarwa and Kirinyaga without access to supplies and the assistance of passive supporters. It proved to be the most sophisticated undertaking of the Kenyan Emergency. In the following weeks, Mau Mau activity surrounding Nairobi remained minor, though a few insurgents reestablished themselves in the outskirts. The British maintained a large security force in the city, conducted regular searches of the African districts, and monitored traffic in and out of the metropolis through the end of October.

In the process of expelling the majority of Nairobi's Kikuyu inhabitants, the British had removed most of the city's unemployed and vagrant population. The local juvenile court was tasked with adjudicating the fate of the younger detainees, but was nearly overwhelmed by their numbers; in the months following the operation magistrates handled over 2,700 prisoners, in comparison to the 558 managed the previous nine months. The demographics of the city's labour force also changed dramatically, with only a quarter of Nairobi workers coming from Kikuyu, Embu, and Meru areas after the operation.

The British devised a three-tiered classification system to handle their prisoners. The "White" grade consisted of detainees set to be released back into Nairobi or transferred to the native reserves. The release initially consisted of mostly trusted members of the armed forces or the colonial administration, though as the sorting process continued the category broadened. Around 2,150 women and 4,000 children were sent to the reserves. The "Grey" grade was made up of prisoners believed to be passive Mau Mau sympathisers though for whom strong evidence suggesting their true loyalties was lacking. The last category, "Black", was reserved for detainees identified by the hooded informers or the Special Branch of the Kenya Police as potentially violent insurgents or terrorists. A few may have been prosecuted by the government, but most were funneled through the "Pipeline", a system of work camps, decreasing in brutality until an individual was "re-educated" and deemed safe to release on a native reserve.
