= John Erskine =

John Erskine may refer to:

== Politicians ==
- John Erskine (1660–1733), MP for Stirling Burghs
- John Erskine of Cardross (1661–1743), Scottish soldier and politician
- Sir John Erskine, 3rd Baronet (1672–1739), Scottish MP
- John Erskine (Royal Navy officer) (1806–1887), Royal Navy officer and British politician
- John Erskine, Lord Erskine (1895–1953), governor of Madras

== Jurists ==
- John Erskine of Carnock (1695–1768), Scottish jurist
- John Erskine (judge) (1813–1895), United States federal judge

== Others ==
- John Erskine, 5th Lord Erskine (1487–1552), Scottish nobleman
- Sir John Erskine of Dun (1509–1591), superintendent of Angus and Mearns, Scotland, and moderator of the General Assembly of the Church of Scotland
- John Erskine (theologian) (1721–1803), leading member of the Evangelicals in the Church of Scotland
- John James Erskine (1771–1833), British colonial administrator
- John Erskine, 4th Baron Erskine (1804–1882), British diplomat and peer
- John Erskine (educator) (1879–1951), American educator and author
- John MacLaren Erskine (1894–1917), British Army officer, and recipient of the Victoria Cross
- John Erskine (music), music producer, see Bad Moon Rising (album)
- John Erskine (ice hockey) (born 1980), professional ice hockey player
- John Erskine, 1st Baron Erskine of Rerrick (1893–1980), Scottish banker
- Jack Erskine (John Angus Erskine, 1873–1960), New Zealand-educated physicist, electrical engineer, benefactor and chess master

== Earls of Mar ==
- John Erskine, Earl of Mar (died 1572)
- John Erskine, Earl of Mar (1558–1634)
- John Erskine, Earl of Mar (1585–1654)
- John Erskine, Earl of Mar (d.1668)
- John Erskine, Earl of Mar (1675–1732) (forfeit 1716)
- John Erskine, Earl of Mar (1741–1825) (restored 1824)
- John Erskine, Earl of Mar (1772–1828)
- John Erskine, Earl of Mar (1795–1866)
- John Goodeve-Erskine, Earl of Mar (1836–1930)
- John Goodeve-Erskine, Earl of Mar (1868–1932)

== See also ==
- John Erskine Read (1888–1973), Canadian judge
