= Shauri Moyo =

Neighbourhood in Pumwani, Nairobi, Kenya

- Location of Shauri Moyo in Kenya
- Coordinates: 1°17′28″S 36°50′49″E
- Country: Kenya
- County: Nairobi City
- Sub-county: Kamukunji

Population (2019)
  - Total: 22,707
  - Density: 78,490/sq mi (30,306/km^{2})

Shauri Moyo is a low-income neighbourhood in Pumwani in the city of Nairobi. It is approximately 3 kilometres (1.9 mi) southeast of the central business district of Nairobi. It is one of the oldest estates in Nairobi.

== Location ==
Shauri Moyo is located approximately 3 kilometres (1.9 mi) southeast of Nairobi's central business district. It is straddled by Jogoo Road to the north. It borders other neighbourhoods such as Bahati and Majengo.

== Overview ==
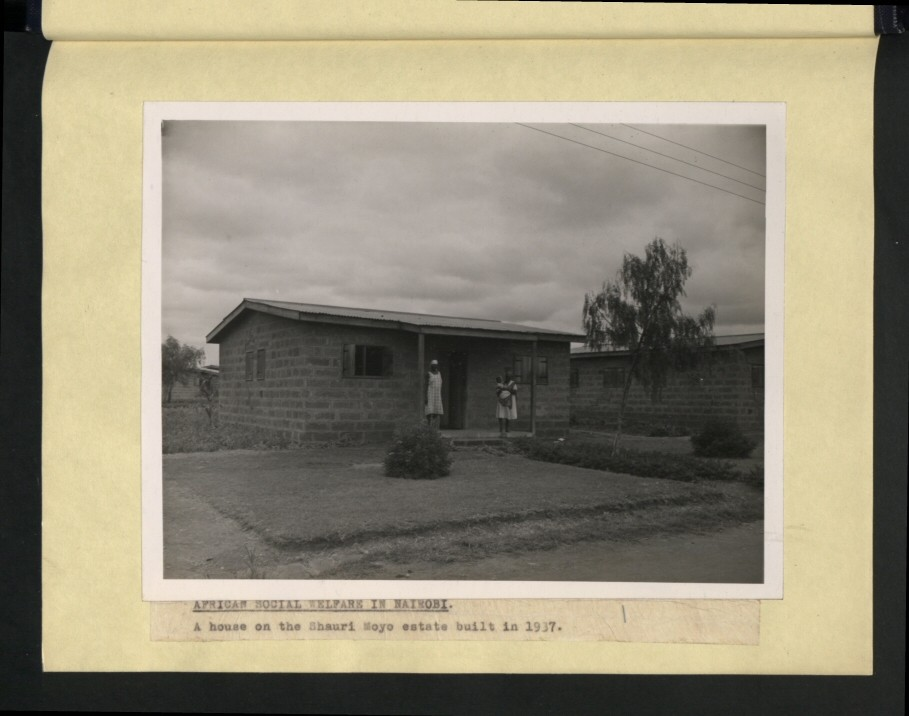
A house on the Shauri Moyo estate built in 1937

Shauri Moyo is one of Nairobi's oldest neighbourhoods, dating back to 1936. During conception Shauri Moyo was considered part of Pumwani. This was when 175 new housing units were built in Pumwani estate and were offered to Africans who used to live in the Asian-populated village of Pangani. The neighbourhood has over the years exhibited features of a shanty town with temporary informal extensions being put up next to the original houses. Shauri Moyo has in the recent years been earmarked for upgrade, with demolition of the old low-density houses to high-density, with 3,000 affordable housing units to tackle the housing deficit in the city.
