= Yusuf Hassan Abdi =

Kenyan politician (born 1953)

Yusuf Hassan Abdi يوسف حسن عبدي
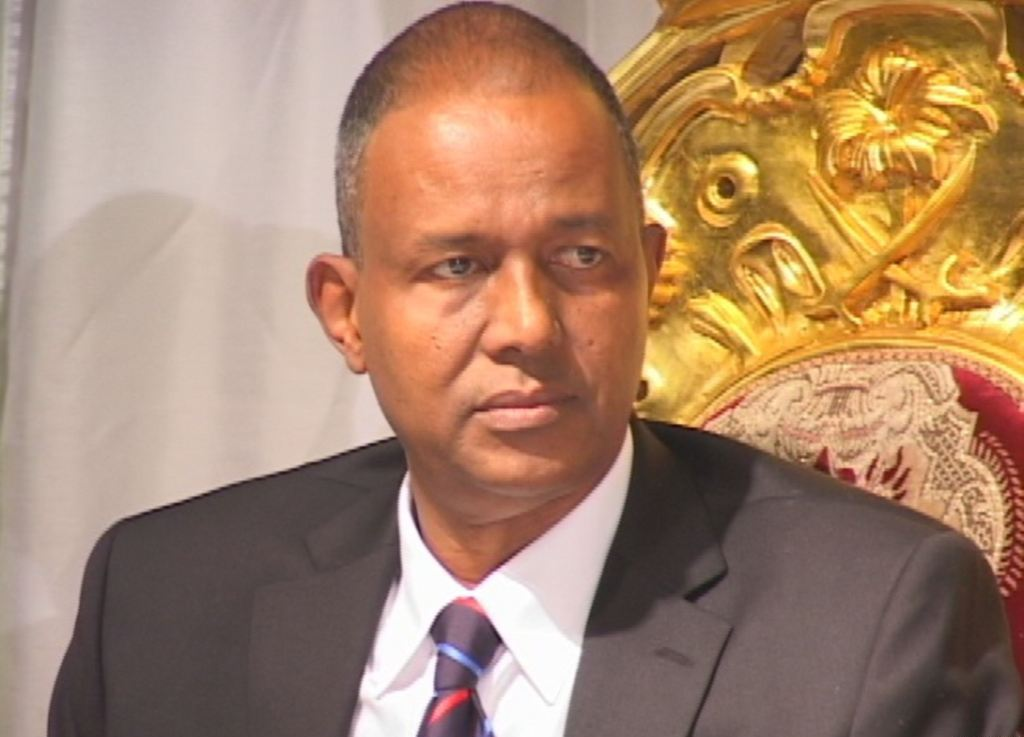

MP for Kamukunji Constituency
- Incumbent
- Assumed office August 2011
- Preceded by: Simon Mbugua

2022
- In office 2006–2007

Senior Policy Adviser for the UN Secretary General
- In office 2002–2006

Head of External and Media Relations of UNHCR
- In office 1999–2001

Personal details
- Born: 9 March 1953 (age 73) Nairobi, Kenya
- Party: Jubilee
- Education: University of Middlesex (BA; DipHE); University of London; Tufts University (MA)
- Occupation: Politician, diplomat, former journalist

Yusuf Hassan Abdi (Somali: Yuusuf Xasan Cabdi, Arabic: يوسف حسن عبدي) (born 9 March 1953) is a Kenyan politician, diplomat, social activist and former journalist. After working many years with the United Nations, he joined the Kenya parliament as a legislator in 2011.

== Background ==
=== Personal life ===
Hassan was born in 1953 in Nairobi, Kenya, to an ethnic Somali family.

Hassan is Muslim. He is multilingual, speaking Somali, English and Swahili fluently. He also has a working knowledge of Arabic, French and Spanish.

=== Education ===
For his elementary education, Hassan studied at the Garissa Primary School in Garissa. He later transferred to Nairobi's Aga Khan Primary School. Upon graduation, Hassan attended Chavakali High School in Vihiga. In Form III, with one year of high school remaining, he was expelled from the institution for having reportedly spearheaded a strike.

Hassan subsequently moved to London, England, in pursuit of higher studies. He attended the University of Middlesex, where he earned a Bachelor of Arts degree (BA) in Humanities, graduating with honours. He also earned a Diploma of Higher Education (DipHE) at the same institution.

Additionally, Hassan worked toward a postgraduate degree in public administration and politics at the University of London. He later obtained a Master of Arts degree (MA) in international relations from The Fletcher School of Law and Diplomacy at Tufts University in Medford, Massachusetts.

== Career ==
=== General ===
In a professional capacity, Hassan began his career in 1974 as an announcer/producer with the Nairobi-based Kenya Broadcasting Corporation (KBC), then known as Voice of Kenya. He subsequently joined the Arab Times in 1978, working for almost a year as a reporter for the Kuwaiti newspaper.

Between 1979 and 1984, Hassan served as a producer for the BBC External Service in London. He spent the next five years as a Senior Editor for the Africa Events monthly magazine, which he had also co-founded.

Due to political unrest and repression in Kenya, Hassan remained in exile at the end of his two-year work contract. He then served as an executive member of the Committee for the Release of Political Prisoners (CRPPK), a protest organization that he had helped found. He also co-edited the association's journal.

In 1987, Hassan was elected chairman of the Ukenya opposition group based in the United Kingdom. Because of his leading role with the association in exposing human rights abuses committed by the Kenyan government against local residents, his passport was revoked and his father was arrested.

In 1990, Hassan steered a group of consultants tasked with assisting the government of Namibia in transitioning its National Radio and Television into a viable public broadcaster. He was the media organization's inaugural Director of Operations, and participated in the tabling of the country's first post-independence communications bill and information policy paper.

From 1992 to 1994, Hassan served as a senior broadcaster of Voice of America's Africa Division. He subsequently traveled to South Africa, where he spent the next few months helping to set up the nation's first community radio station for the local South African population.

In 1994, Hassan joined the United Nations High Commissioner for Refugees (UNHCR), based in Geneva, Switzerland. He was thereafter assigned to a number of different diplomatic posts around the world, acting as the Senior External Media Relations and Public Information Officer for the Southern SADC Region. Between 1999 and 2001, he was UNHCR's Head of External and Media Relations in Southwest and Central Asia, based in Islamabad. He also represented the agency in East Timor and Southern Africa.

In 2001 and 2002, Hassan acted as the senior spokesman for the United Nations' operations in Kabul. He spent the next four years as a Senior Policy Adviser for the UN Secretary General in New York. His areas of concern included the Horn of Africa, the Middle East, Southwest Asia and the Great Lakes region.

From 2006 to 2007, Hassan served as Director of IRIN, a UN news organization. He subsequently worked as the UNHCR's Regional Communications Manager in Nairobi.

=== Political career ===
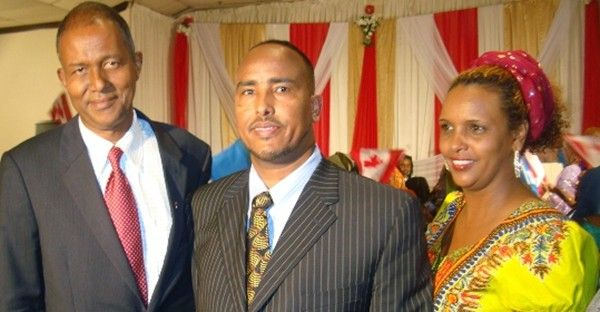
Hassan with Somali journalist Hassan Abdillahi and entrepreneur Mariam Adam, in Toronto during Hassan's Canada Day keynote address (July 1, 2011).

Prompted by requests from the Somali business community in Eastleigh to run for office, Hassan stepped down from his post with the UN in 2007 to present himself as a candidate in that year's Kamukunji by-election. Initially running on an Orange Democratic Movement (ODM) ticket, he reportedly won the seat until party leaders later reversed the decision and awarded the position to a rival challenger. Hassan subsequently switched tickets to ODM-Kenya, where he came in third in a December 2007 by-election marred by voting irregularities. According to Hassan's supporters and one of his key campaigners Ms Saumu Saidi, he would have won the seat had it not been for stolen ballot boxes.

In August 2011, Hassan again presented himself as a candidate for the Kamukunji Constituency, this time on a Party of National Unity (PNU) ticket. He obtained 19,030 votes, securing the win in an election marked by low voter turnout and party clashes, but otherwise described as free and fair.

During his first few months in parliament, Hassan was a frequent floor speaker. Addressing the National Assembly 214 times as of December 2012, he often championed issues of concern to his Somali community.

In 2012, Hassan announced his intention to run again for office. He subsequently met with Somali groups in Columbus, Ohio to drum up support for his re-election bid. The ensuing conference was reportedly attended by many members of the Somali community, who greeted Hassan warmly and pledged to support his campaign.

On December 7, 2012, Hassan was wounded in a night-time grenade attack in Eastleigh, while he was convening with his constituents after prayers at the Hidaya Mosque. According to Hiiraan Online, Hassan had been targeted by anti-peace elements, who tried to assassinate him due to his work with the Kamukunji Constituency. Hassan was subsequently transported to the Aga Khan Hospital, where he was treated for a broken leg. Police later cordoned off the scene of the explosion as they conducted investigations into the blast's cause. In January 2013, Hassan underwent extensive reconstructive surgery on his lower legs at a Johannesburg hospital. He was reportedly making good progress according to his wife.

In March 2013, on a The National Alliance (TNA) party ticket, Hassan was re-elected to a second term as an MP for the Kamukunji Constituency. On 8 August 2017, he was re-elected back to parliament in a Jubilee ticket winning by 54% of the total votes cast.

He was re-elected for a fourth term in the 2022 Kenyan general election.

== Awards ==
In 2012, Hassan was named Person of the Year by the Somali news organization Hiiraan Online. According to the media outlet, he was chosen because of his effective representation of the Somali community, his strong relationship with Eastleigh's business constituency, and his success in landing key infrastructure development projects for the riding.

== See also ==
- Amina Mohamed
