= James St Clair-Erskine =

James St Clair-Erskine may refer to:

- James St Clair-Erskine, 2nd Earl of Rosslyn (1762–1837), British peer
- James St Clair-Erskine, 3rd Earl of Rosslyn (1802–1866), British peer
- James St Clair-Erskine, 5th Earl of Rosslyn (1869–1939), British peer

== See also ==
- James Erskine (disambiguation)
