= Regina Akoth Ombam =

Kenya's Principal Secretary for Trade

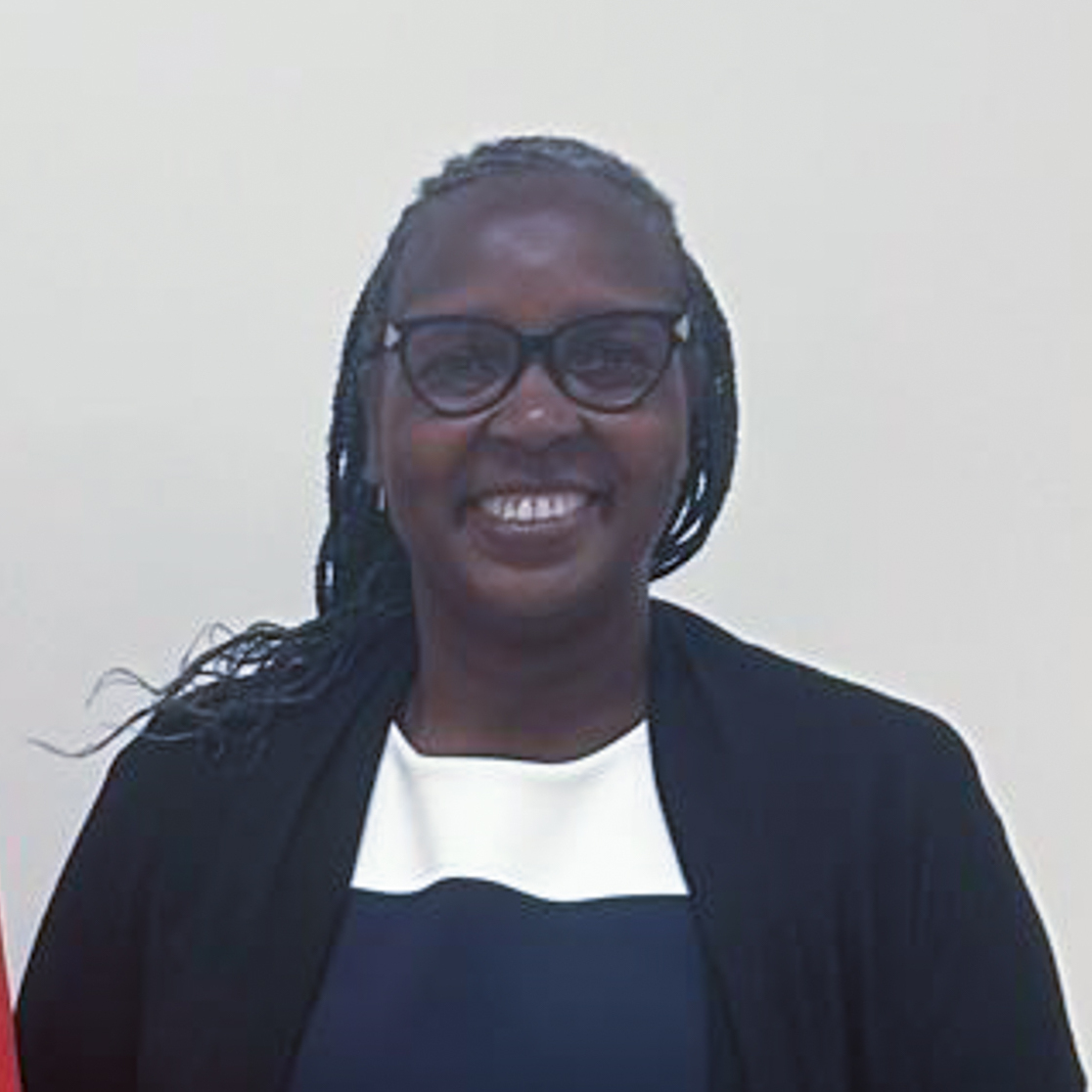
- Ombam in 2025
- Citizenship: Kenya
- Education: Bachelor of Arts in Anthropology; Master of Arts in Economics; Master of Public Administration
- Alma mater: University of Nairobi; Columbia University
- Occupations: Economist, public policy expert
- Years active: 2000s–present
- Employer: Government of Kenya
- Known for: Trade policy, public finance, and health financing reforms
- Office: Principal Secretary, State Department for Trade

Regina Akoth Ombam is a Kenyan economist and public policy expert who is the principal secretary, State Department for Trade, Government of Kenya.

== Education background ==
Ombam started school at Our Lady of Mercy Primary School in Kamukunji. She holds a Bachelor of Arts degree in Anthropology, Master of Arts degree in Economics from the University of Nairobi and a Masters Degree in Public Administration from Columbia University.

== Career ==
Ombam is currently serving as the principal secretary State Department for Trade Ministry of Investments, Trade and Industry where she was nominated by President William Ruto on Thursday, March 20, 2025. She has served in national, regional and global institutions. She was the Regional Health Financing Expert at the East African Community Secretariat where she advocated for sustainable healthcare funding across member states. She established the Health Financing Hub in the region together with the Ministers of Health and Finance where they advocated for an increase in domestic health investments across Africa. She also served as the Deputy Director for HIV Investments at Kenya's National AIDS Control Council(NACC) where she mobilized international and local resources in the fight against HIV/AIDS in Kenya.

Ombam was one of the Technical Experts at the Council of Governors Secretariat during the devolution and also as the Vice Chair of the Technical Review Panel of the Global Fund as well the advisor to the World Bank President and UNAIDS Executive Director on Sustainable Financing for Health. She called upon all the counties in Kenya to unite and position themselves as the engines of Kenya's trade and investment growth.

== See also ==
- Cabinet of Kenya
