= General Erskine =

General Erskine may refer to:

- George Elphinstone Erskine (1841–1912), British Indian Army major general
- George Erskine (1899–1965), British Army general
- Graves B. Erskine (1897–1973), U.S. Marine Corps general
- Ian Erskine (1898–1973), British Army major general
- John Erskine, Earl of Mar (1675–1732), Scottish Jacobite general
- Sir William Erskine, 1st Baronet (1728–1795), British Army lieutenant general
- Sir William Erskine, 2nd Baronet (1770–1813), British Army major general

== See also ==
- Vernon Erskine-Crum (1918–1971), British Army lieutenant general
