= Majengo, Nairobi =

Suburb of Nairobi, Kenya

Coordinates: 1.2859°S 36.8424°E

Majengo is a slum in the Pumwani area of Nairobi. In 2019, it had a population of 17,645, and a population density of 51,692/km^{2}. It is approximately 3 kilometres (1.9 mi) from Nairobi central business district, and next to Gikomba Market. Majengo forms part of Pumwani ward; which is in the larger Kamukunji sub-county of Nairobi City County. Majengo also hosts the headquarters for Kamukunji Constituency.

Majengo has 5 villages : Mashimoni, Sofia, Bash/Highrise, Kitui village, Digo and Katanga. The major roads cutting through the settlement are, Digo Road, Lumbwa Street, Meru Road, Lamu Road and Munyema Street. It existed in the 1920s already. Majengo Clinic exists in Majengo. The area is infamous for rife crime, prostitution as well as domestic violence.
