= Pumwani =

- Location within Kenya
- Coordinates: 1.282°S 36.845°E
- Country: Kenya
- County: Nairobi City County

Population (2019)
  - Total: 42,461
- Time zone: UTC+3 (EAT)

Pumwani is an estate of Nairobi. It is one of the oldest estates in Nairobi's eastlands. In 2019 it had an estimated population of 42,461, a population density of 34,767/km^{2}. Pumwani contains other neighbourhoods such as Magorofani, Shauri Moyo, Majengo, Bondeni and Maziwa.

The Pumwani Maternity Hospital is located in Pumwani. It is the largest public maternity hospital in Kenya.

Many Kenyan freedom fighters are known to have lived in Pumwani including the first and the second presidents, Jomo Kenyatta and Daniel Moi. It is also the place where Lord Burden Powell founded the first scouts movement in the interior of Africa.

The St. John's Church is also located in Pumwani. It is the seat of St. John's Archdeaconry of Anglican Church of Kenya.

== Pumwani division ==
Prior to 2013, Pumwani was also a name of a larger administrative area, Pumwani division. The division was subdivided into five locations: Bahati, Eastleigh North, Eastleigh South, Kamukunji and Pumwani.

Pumwani division had identical borders with Kamukunji Constituency.

Currently, Pumwani represents one of the five electoral wards within Kamukunji Constituency.
