= Sugata Marjit =

Indian economist

- সুগত মারজিৎ
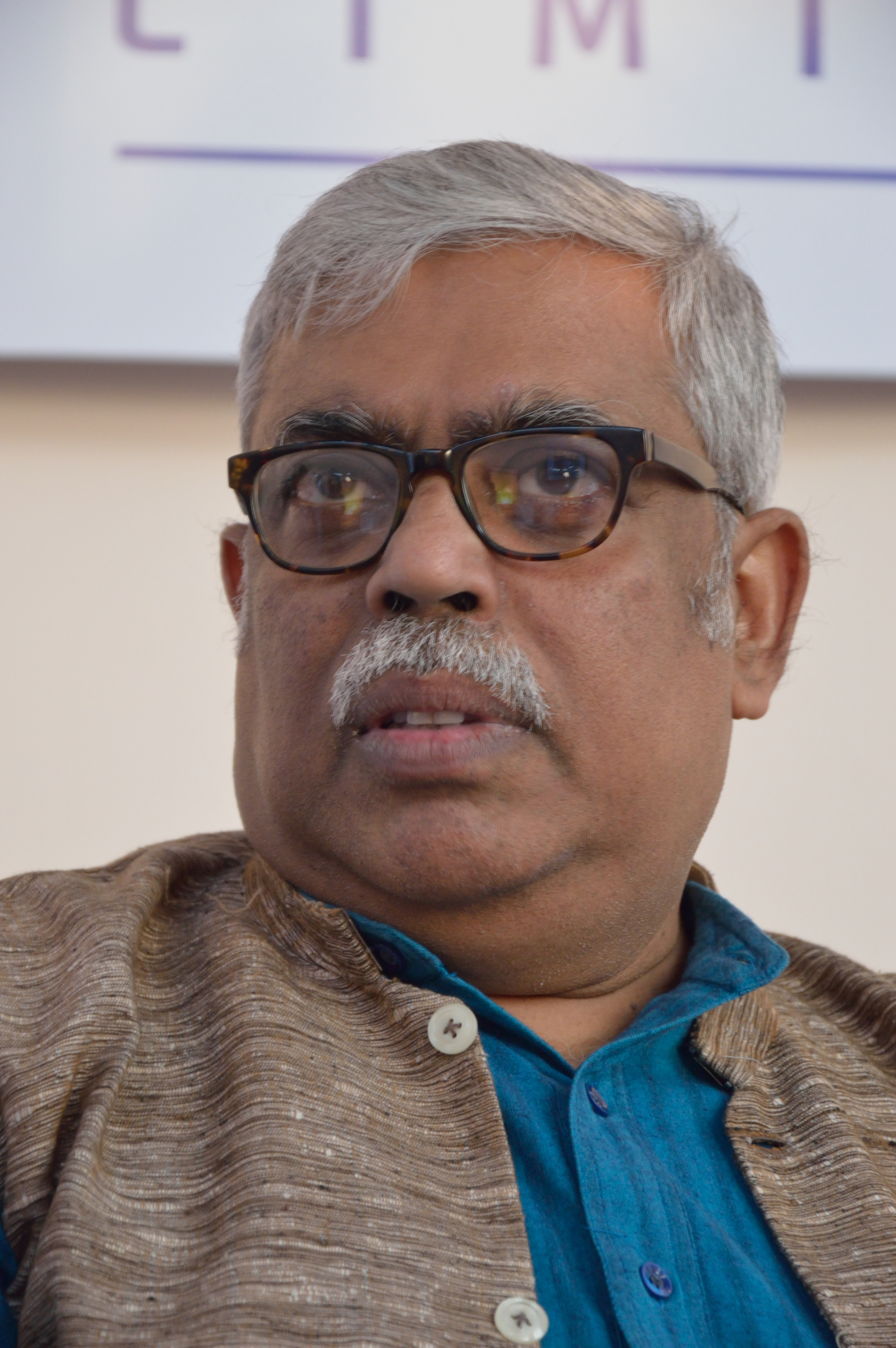

Vice Chancellor of Calcutta University
- Acting
- In office 15 July 2015 – 14 July 2016
- Preceded by: Suranjan Das
- Succeeded by: Ashutosh Ghosh

Personal details
- Born: 4 December 1959 (age 66)
- Known for: International economics, Macroeconomics

Sugata Marjit is the former Vice Chancellor of the University of Calcutta and currently the First Distinguished Professor at Indian Institute of Foreign Trade and the Project Director of Centre for Training & Research in Public Finance and Policy (CTRPFP), a Ministry of Finance, Government of India funded initiative. He did his Ph.D. at the University of Rochester and is currently the Editor of South Asian Journal of Macroeconomics and Public Finance. He used to be the Director of Centre for Studies in Social Sciences, Calcutta from March 2007 to March 2012 and Reserve Bank of India Chair Professor of Industrial Economics at CSSSC till September 2019. On 15 July 2015 he took the charge as an interim Vice-Chancellor of the prestigious University of Calcutta in Kolkata, India.

== Awards and honors ==
- Recipient of the Panchanan Chakravarty Memorial Award (1999) awarded by the Bengal Economic Association for promoting teaching and research in West Bengal, India
- Mahalanobis Memorial Medal, Indian Econometric Society, 2002
- Recipient of the best paper award US$10000 from the Global Development Network (World Bank) on the theme "Globalization and Inequality" (2003)
- V.K.R.V. Rao National Award for Young Social Scientist (Economics, 2003) by the Indian Council of Social Science Research ( Ministry of HRD., Govt. of India)
- External Research Fellow – Nottingham Centre for Research on Globalization and Economic Policy(GEP), University of Nottingham (2008 – )
- Prof. AL Nagar Fellow, Indian Econometric Society, 2020

== Publications ==
=== Books ===
- Marjit, Sugata; Raychaudhuri, Ajitava (1997). India's exports: an analytical study. Delhi New York: Oxford University Press. ISBN 9780195642353.
- Marjit, Sugata; Acharyya, Rajat (2003). International trade, wage inequality and the developing economy: a general equilibrium approach. Heidelberg New York: Physica-Verlag. ISBN 9783790800319.
- Marjit, Sugata; Singh, Nirvikar (2003). Joint ventures, international investment and technology transfer. New Delhi New York: Oxford University Press. ISBN 9780195648027.
- Marjit, Sugata (2008). International trade and economic development: essays in theory and policy. New Delhi: Oxford University Press. ISBN 9780195691719.
- Marjit, Sugata; Mallick, Indrajit (2008). Financial intermediation in a less developed economy the history of the United Bank of India. New Delhi, India: Sage. ISBN 9781281963604.
- Marjit, Sugata; Kar, Saibal (2011). The Outsiders" Economic Reform and Informal Labour in a Developing Economy. New Delhi, India: Oxford University Press. ISBN 9780198071495.
- Marjit, Sugata; Mandal, Biswajit; Nakanishi, Noritsugu (2020). "Virtual Trade and Comparative Advantage : The Fourth Dimension". Springer Nature. Springer Singapore. ISBN 978-981-15-3906-0 .
- Marjit, Sugata; Das, Gouranga G.; Mandal, Biswajit (2023). "Virtual Trade in a Changing World : Comparative Advantage, Growth and Inequality". Cambridge University Press. ISBN 978-100-91-0574-3
