= Robert Erskine =

Robert Erskine may refer to:

- Robert Erskine (inventor) (1735–1780), Scottish inventor and engineer
- Robert Erskine (physician) (1677–1718), advisor to Peter the Great
- Robert St Clair-Erskine, 4th Earl of Rosslyn (1833–1890), Scottish Conservative politician
- Lestocq Robert Erskine (1857–1916), Scottish tennis player
- Robert Erskine (coach) (1904–1978), American college football and basketball coach, 1920s and '30s
- Robert Erskine (politician) (1905–1982), Australian politician
- Sir Robert Erskine-Hill, 2nd Baronet (1917–1989), of the Erskine-Hill baronets
- Robert Erskine (sculptor) (born 1954), English sculptor
- Two 15th/16th-century Lords Erskine

== See also ==
- Erskine (surname)
