= List of vice-chancellors of the University of Calcutta =

Vice-chancellor of University of Calcutta
- Incumbent; Ashutosh Ghosh since 30 October 2025
- Formation: 24 January 1857; 169 years ago
- First holder: James William Colvile

The vice-chancellor of the University of Calcutta, a university in Kolkata, India, is the executive head of the university. Following the establishment in 1857, James William Colvile served as the first vice-chancellor of the university.

== List of vice-chancellors ==
S. No.	Name	Term	Image	Notes
1	James William Colvile	1857–1859		
2	William Ritchie	1859–1862		
3	Claudius James Erskine	1862–1863		
4	Henry Sumner Maine	1863–1867		
5	W. S. Seton-Karr	1867–1869		
6	Edward Clive Bayley	1869–1875		
7	Arthur Hobhouse	1875–1877		
8	William Markby	1877–1878		
9	Alexander Arbuthnot	1878–1880		
10	Arthur Wilson	1880–1884		
11	H. J. Reynolds	1883–1886		
12	C. P. Ilbert	1886		
13	William Wilson Hunter	1886–1887		
14	William Comer Petheram	1887–1889		
15	Gooroodas Banerjee	1890–1892		First Indian vice chancellor of the university
16	Jones Quain Pigot	1893		
17	Alfred Woodley Croft	1893–1896		
18	E. J. Trevelyan	1897–1898		
19	Francis William Maclean	1898–1900		
20	Thomas Raleigh	1900–1904		
21	Alexander Pedler	1904–1906		
22	Asutosh Mookerjee	1906–1914		
23	Deva Prasad Sarbadhikari	1914–1918		
24	Lancelot Sanderson	1918–1919		
25	Dr. Nilratan Sircar	1919–1921		Eminent Indian physician
(22)	Asutosh Mookerjee (second term)	1921–1923		
26	Bhupendra Nath Bose	1923–1924		
27	William Ewart Greaves	1924–1926		
28	Jadunath Sarkar	1926–1928		
29	W. S. Urquhart	1928–1930		
30	Lt. Col. Hassan Suhrawardy	1930–1934		
31	Syama Prasad Mookerjee	1934–1938		Union Minister (1947–1950) & Member of Parliament (1952–1953)
32	Sir Azizul Haque	1938–1942		High Commissioner of India to the United Kingdom (1941–1943)
33	Dr. Bidhan Chandra Roy	1942–1944		Chief Minister of West Bengal (1948–1962)
34	Radhabinod Pal	1944–1946		Member of United Nations' International Law Commission (1952–1966)
35	Pramathanath Banerjee	1946–1949		Member of Parliament (1957–1962)
36	Charu Chandra Biswas	1949–1950		Union Minister (1952–1958) & Member of Parliament (1952–1960)
37	Sambhunath Banerjee	1950–1954		
38	Jnan Chandra Ghosh	1954–1955		
39	Nirmal Kumar Sidhanta	1955–1960		
40	Dr. Subodh Mitra	1960–1961		Eminent Indian obstretrician and gynecologist
41	Surajit Chandra Lahiri	1962		Former Chief Justice of Calcutta High Court (1959–1961)
42	Bidhubhushan Malik	1962–1968		
43	S. N. Sen	1968–1976		
44	Sushil Kumar Mukherjee	1976–1979		
45	Ramendra Kumar Podder	1979–1983		Member of Parliament (1985–1993)
46	Santosh Bhattacharyya	1983–1987		
47	Bhaskarananda Ray Chaudhuri	1987–1991		
48	Rathindra Narayan Basu	1991–1999		
49	Asis Kumar Banerjee	1999–2008		
50	Suranjan Das	2008–2015		
–	Sugata Marjit (acting)	2015–2016		
–	Ashutosh Ghosh (acting)	2016–2017		
51	Sonali Chakravarti Banerjee	2017–2022		
52	Asis Kumar Chattopadhyay	2022–2023		
–	Dr. Santa Dutta (De) (acting)	2023–2025		
53	Ashutosh Ghosh	2025–Incumbent		
