= David Erskine =

David Erskine may refer to:

- David Erskine, 2nd Lord Cardross (1627–1671)
- David Erskine, Lord Dun (1670–1758)
- David Erskine, 11th Earl of Buchan (1742–1829), Scottish eccentric
- David Erskine (dramatist) (1772–1837)
- David Erskine, 2nd Baron Erskine (1776–1855), Scottish diplomat and peer
- David Erskine, 13th Earl of Buchan (1815–1891), Scottish army officer and jockey
- Sir (Henry) David Erskine of Cardross (1838–1921), Scottish military officer and Serjeant-at-Arms of the House of Commons
- David Charles Erskine (1866–1922), British Member of Parliament for West Perthshire, 1906–1910
- David Erskine (rugby union) (born 1969), former Irish international rugby union player
