= Erskine (given name) =

Erskine is a given name which may refer to:

== People ==
- Erskine Beveridge (1851–1920), Scottish textile manufacturer, historian and antiquary
- Erskine Bowles (born 1945), American businessman and politician
- Erskine Butterfield (1913–1961), American pianist, singer, bandleader and composer
- Erskine Caldwell (1903–1987), American author
- Erskine Childers (author) (1870–1922), author and Irish nationalist, secretary-general of the Irish delegation that negotiated the Anglo-Irish Treaty in 1921
- Erskine Hamilton Childers (1905–1974), Fianna Fáil minister and President of Ireland, son of the above
- Erskine Barton Childers (1929–1996), United Nations civil servant, son of the above
- Erskine Hawkins (1914–1993), American trumpeter and big band leader
- Erskine Hazard (1789–1865), American industrialist
- Erskine B. Ingram (1866–1954), American businessman and philanthropist
- E. Bronson Ingram II (1931–1995), American billionaire heir and philanthropist
- Erskine Johnson (1910–1984), American Hollywood gossip columnist
- Erskine May (1815–1886), British constitutional theorist
- Erskine Mayer (1889–1957), American Major League Baseball player
- Erskine Neale (1804–1883), English Anglican clergyman and author
- Erskine Nicol (1825–1904), Scottish painter
- Erskine Ramsay (1864–1953), American industrialist and philanthropist
- Erskine Mayo Ross (1845–1928), American attorney and judge, justice of the Supreme Court of California
- Erskine Sanford (1885–1969), American actor
- Erskine Tate (1895–1978), American jazz violinist and bandleader
- Erskine Douglas Williamson (1886–1923), Scottish geophysicist

== Fictional characters ==
- Erskine Ravel, in the Skulduggery Pleasant series by Derek Landy

== See also ==
- Erskine (surname)
