= William Erskine =

William Erskine may refer to:

- William Erskine (bishop) (c. 1555–1639), Scottish clergyman
- William Erskine (master of Charterhouse) (died 1685), master of Charterhouse Hospital
- William Erskine (died 1697), member of the Parliament of Scotland for Culross
- William Erskine (1691–1754), member of the Parliament of Great Britain for Perth Burghs
- Sir William Erskine, 1st Baronet (1728–1795), British Army officer
- William Erskine, Lord Kinneder (1768–1822), Scottish scholar and songwriter
- Sir William Erskine, 2nd Baronet (1770–1813), British Army officer and Member of Parliament
- William Erskine (historian) (1773–1852), Scottish orientalist and historian
- William Erskine (diplomat) (1871–1952), British ambassador
