= Eastleigh, Nairobi =

Eastleigh
- Suburb
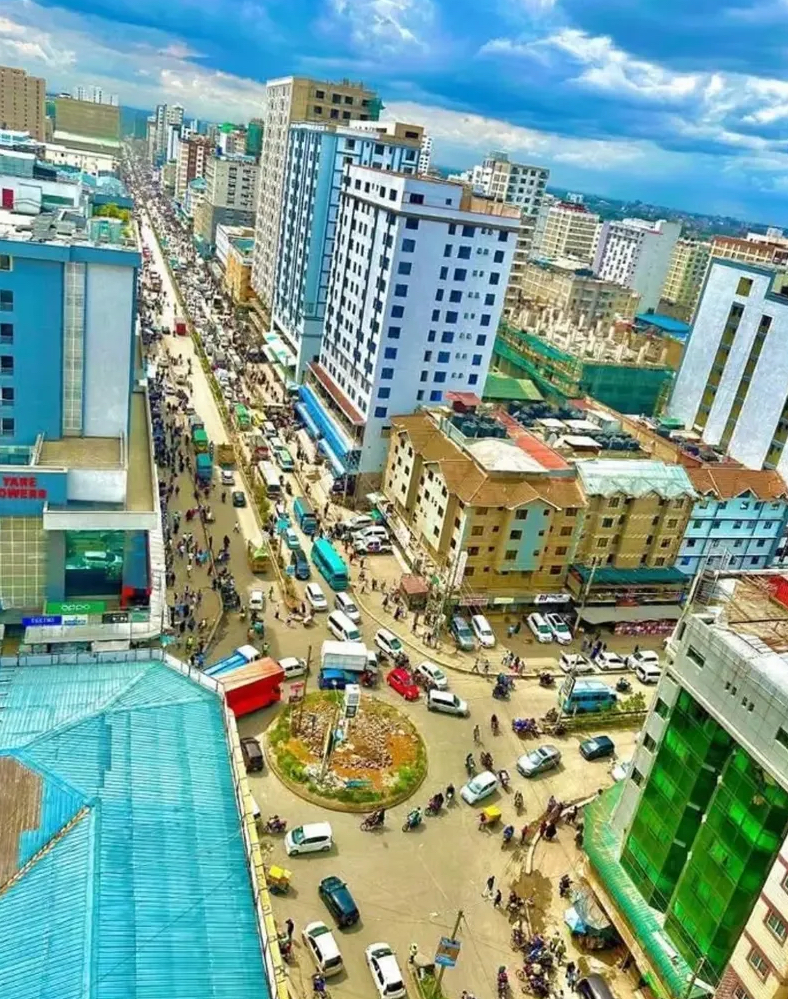
- Aerial view of First Avenue, Eastleigh

- Location of Eastleigh
- Coordinates: 1°16′00″S 36°51′00″E
- Country: Kenya
- County: Nairobi City
- Sub-county: Kamukunji
- Established: c. 1921

Area
  - Total: 6.9 km^{2} (2.7 sq mi)

Population (2019)
  - Total: 152,484
  - Density: 42,330/km^{2} (109,600/sq mi)
- Time zone: UTC+3 (EAT)

Eastleigh is a mixed-use neighbourhood in Nairobi, Kenya. It is located east of the central business district. It is known for its business prowess.

== History ==
Eastleigh was founded in 1921. At this time, it was formally called Nairobi East Township. While the colonial government originally tried to segregate citizens by race and ethnicity, failures at doing so in the Eastleigh neighbourhood more or less stopped the practice under colonial rule, so class became the general segregating factor afterwards. The colonial government allotted Nairobi's residential estates by race, and Eastleigh was targeted for Asians and elite Africans who worked as clerks, builders, or shoemakers. Eastleigh was originally a large Kenyan Asian enclave until independence in 1963. In recent years, the suburb has been dominated by Somalis.

== Military ==
Eastleigh Airport (Moi Air Base) is located in the northern part of Eastleigh. The base was the site of the British Royal Air Force base known as RAF Eastleigh. The dual-use facility was also the main civilian international airport in Nairobi for the period 1943–1958 before the opening of the new airport at Embakasi (since named Jomo Kenyatta International Airport).

Since 2012, the neighbourhood and various areas across Kenya have experienced a number of terrorist attacks linked to the Al-Shabaab militant group, which were launched in retaliation for the Kenyan military's deployment of troops in southern Somalia against the insurgents.

== Administrative divisions ==
Administratively, Eastleigh is divided into Airbase, Eastleigh North, and Eastleigh South. It contains the California and Maina Wanjigi neighbourhoods. The whole of Eastleigh is under the sub-county of Kamukunji.

In addition to California and Maina Wanjigi, Eastleigh is further partitioned into three areas:

- Section I - from Juja Road
- Section II - the commercial centre
- Section III - situated further south towards Jogoo Road

The postal code for Eastleigh is 00610

== Economy ==
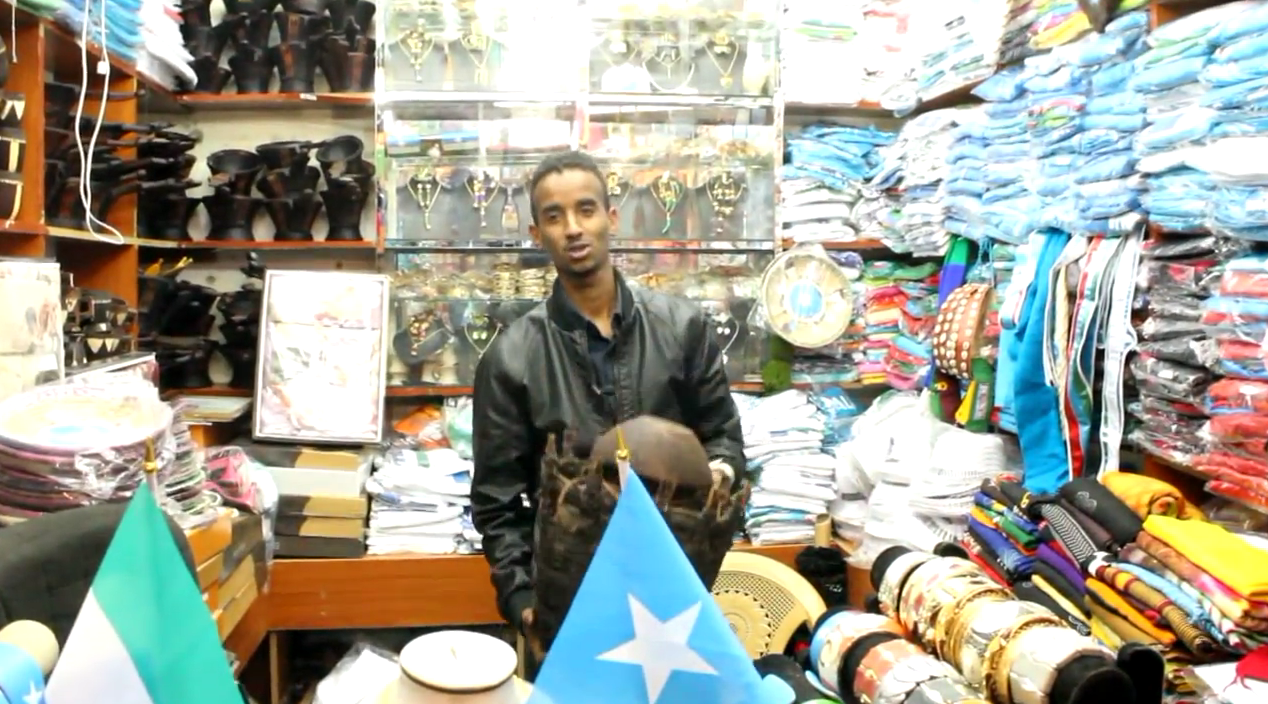
A Somali store owner in Eastleigh

Eastleigh is mostly inhabited by Somalis, except for a few indigenous residents. The suburb's commercial sector is likewise dominated by Somalis, with most businesses owned by the Somali community.

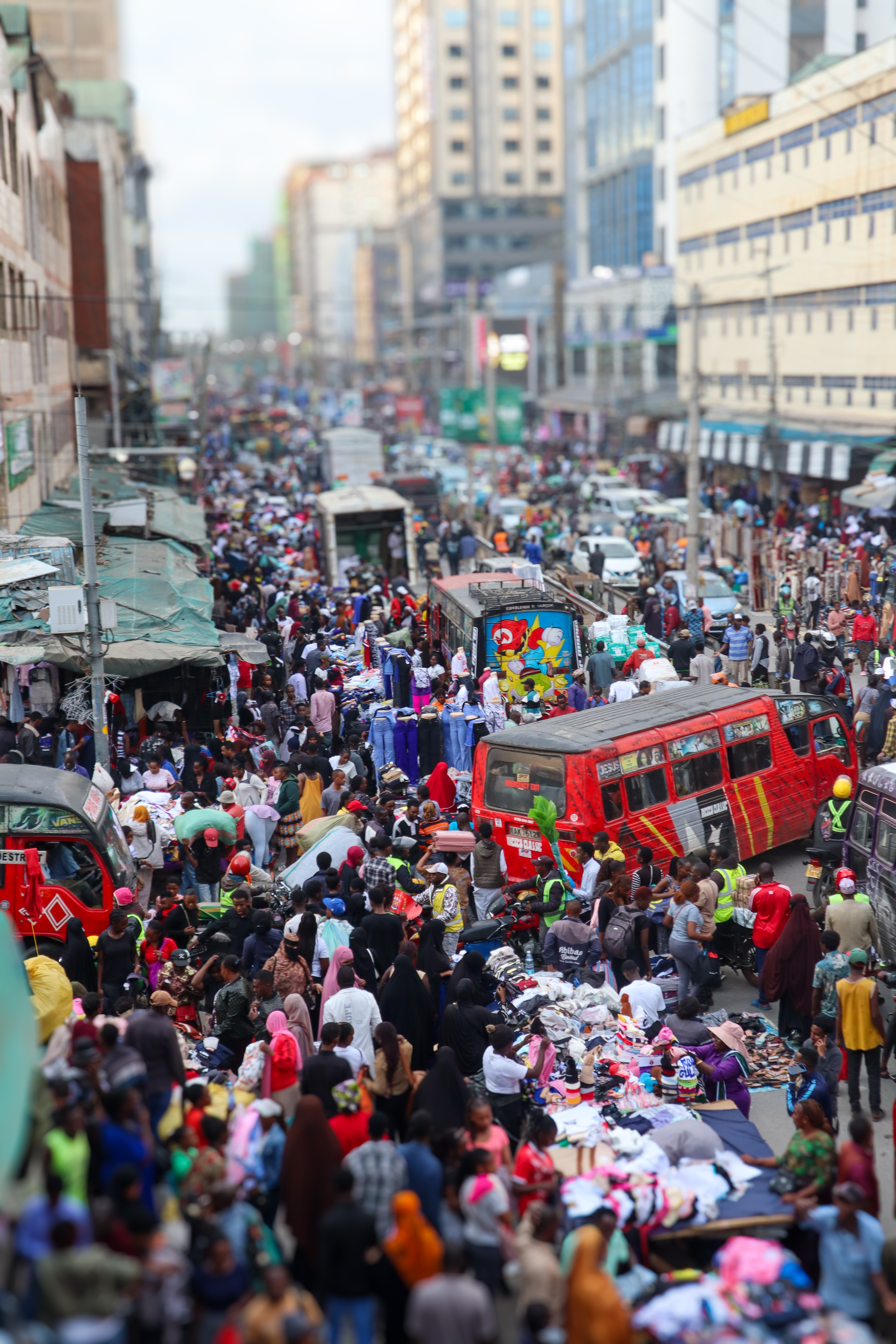
View over Eastleigh Market

Businesses in the suburb range from small stalls to shopping malls and night lodges. Products are typically imported from Mogadishu and Dubai, and include designer clothing, jewelry and even camel milk. Starting in late 2012, a mass exodus of Somali residents was reported after a prolonged period of harassment by the Kenyan police and public. Hundreds of Somali entrepreneurs withdrew between Sh10 to Sh40 billion from their bank accounts, with the intention of reinvesting most of that money back home in Somalia. The collective departures most affected Eastleigh's real estate sector, as landlords struggled to find Kenyans able to afford the high rates of the apartments and shops vacated by the Somalis.

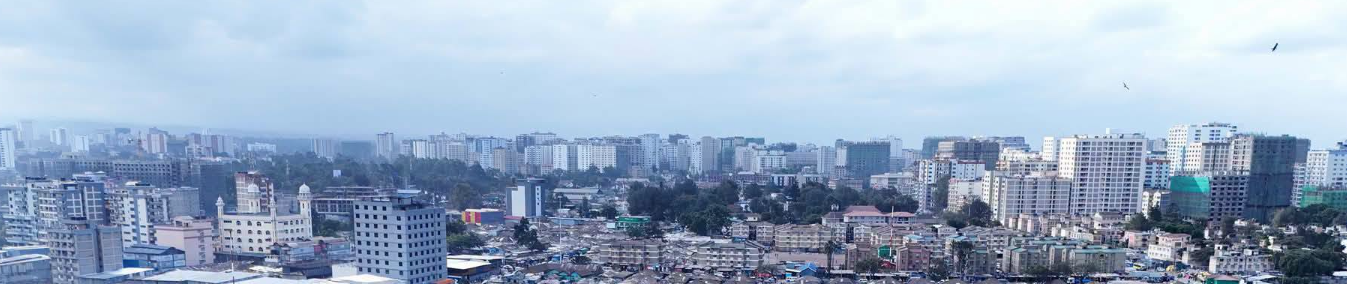
Eastleigh Skyline

== 2026 Building collapse ==
On 23 October 2026, at about 1am local time, an 18-storey building under construction along 9th Street collapsed. The building had not received approval from the Nairobi County government nor did it possess a licence from the National Environment Management Authority. On 26 October, the Director of Public Prosecutions ordered the Directorate of Criminal Investigations to conduct a criminal investigation into the collapse.

=== Rescue operations ===
Rescue efforts were coordinated by the Kenya Defence Forces, the National Disaster Management Unit, the National Police Service, the Nairobi County Government, the Kenya Red Cross and other organisations. Equipment from the Chinese equipment manufacturing company XCMG, detected two trapped under the rubble. There were 67 workers at the site one of whom was injured while the rest were unharmed. 52 people were initially reported missing by relatives who believed they were in the building. By 24 October, at least 31 people were reportedly trapped under the rubble. By 25 October, four people had been rescued. By 27 October, 32 people of the 52 initially missing, had been accounted for, leaving 20 still missing. By the same day, the number of rescued people had risen to six, all of whom were alive. By 28 October, the number of missing had gone down to 16, about 80% of the rubble had been cleared and the director for the National Disaster Management Unit said rescue operations could end on 29 or 30 October. No people or bodies had been recovered since the 24th. On 30 October, a dismembered body of a woman was recovered at about 6:30 am. A second body of a woman was recovered on 3 November. Six corpses were recovered on 5 November, bringing the total confirmed fatalities by that day to eight. The multi-agency team ended rescue operations on 6 November after searching all accessible basement compartments, where some of the missing people were believed to have been trapped. The team would later clear the debris, restore road access and enable nearby businesses to resume normal work.

== Schools ==
Schools located in Eastleigh or its vicinity include:

- Eastleigh High School
- St Teresa Boys High School
- St Teresa Girls High School
- Pumwani Boys High School
- Maina Wajingi High school
- Compit Educational Centre
- Mary Happy High School
- Rabbani High School
- Ansara Sunna Trust

== Notable residents ==
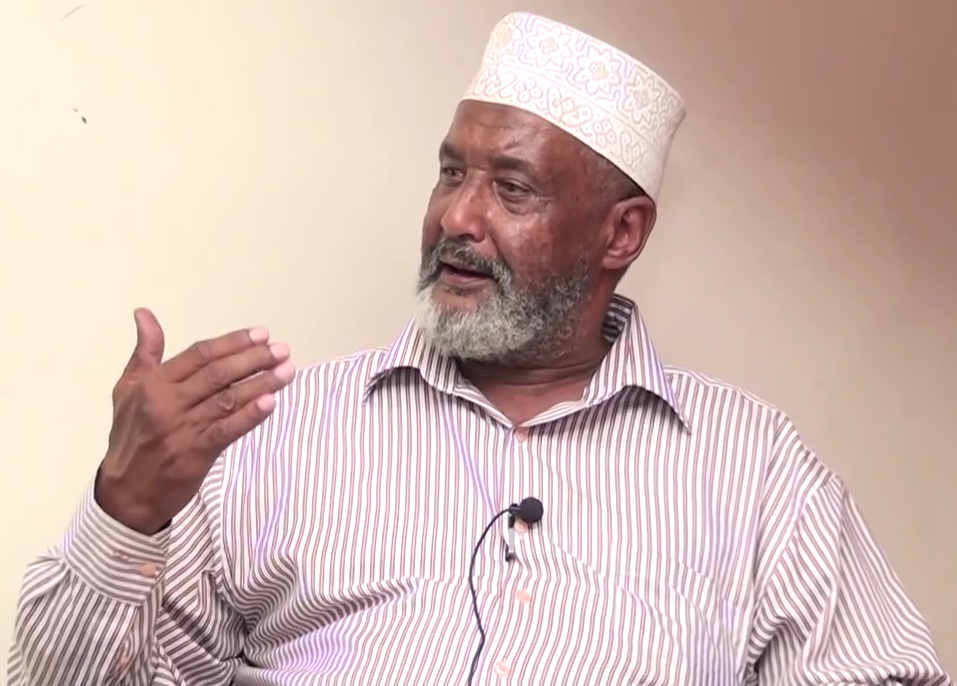
Somali entrepreneur Hussein Mohamed, Vice Chairman of the Eastleigh Business Association

- Hussein Mohamed, Vice Chairman of the Eastleigh Business Association.
- Mohamed Amin, a famous photojournalist born in Eastleigh.
