= John Erskine of Cardross =

Scottish soldier and politician (1662-1743)

John Edmund Erskine
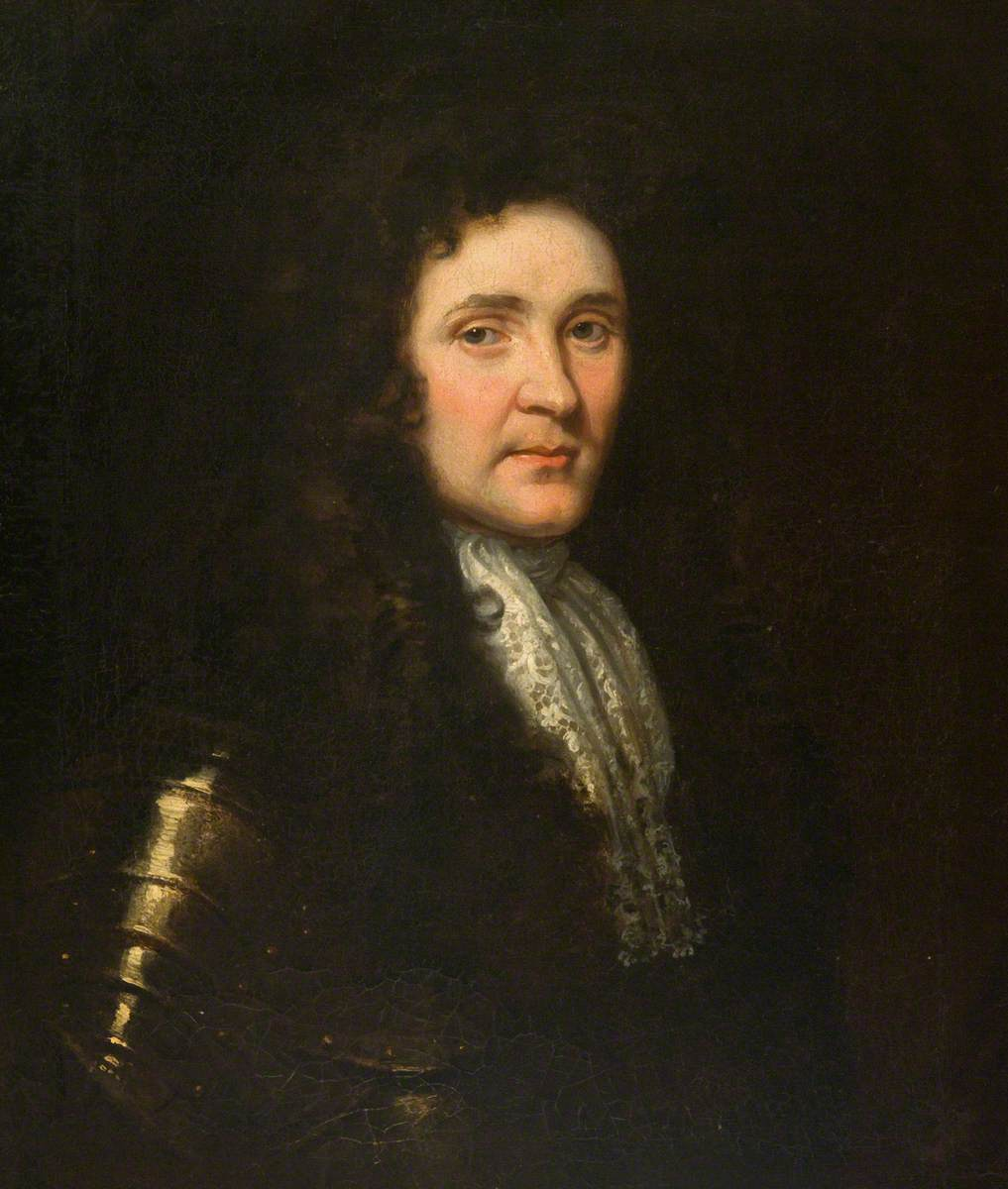
- Born: 30 March 1662; Cardross, Scotland
- Died: 13 January 1743 (aged 80)
- Parent(s): David Erskine; Mary Bruce

Colonel The Honourable John Edmund Erskine (30 March 1662 – 13 January 1743), of Cardross, was a Scottish soldier and politician. His journal was printed in the nineteenth century. He was nicknamed 'The Black Colonel'.

His portrait can be found hanging at Culross Palace, a property in the care of The National Trust for Scotland in the Royal Burgh of Culross.

== Background ==
Born in Cardross, Scotland on 30 March 1662, a younger son of David Erskine, 2nd Lord Cardross, by his second wife, Mary Bruce, daughter of Sir George Bruce of Carnock. His father was a member of a cadet branch of the Earls of Buchan.

== Career ==
Erskine's strongly Presbyterian sympathies led him to choose the winning sides during the Glorious Revolution of 1688 and the deliberations prior to the Act of Union of 1707.

He joined Archibald Campbell, 9th Earl of Argyll's unsuccessful rebellion against James VII and II in 1685 and afterwards fled from Scotland to join the army of William of Orange, where he was given command of a Regiment of Foot. He landed in England with William's invading army in 1688, the beginning of the Glorious Revolution. In return for his service, he was given further commands in William's army, and was made governor of Stirling and Dumbarton castles.

He was an early investor in the Company of Scotland trading to Africa and the Indies, and, on 3rd April 1696, he was elected to the company's court of directors. He was actively involved in the management of the company and, in November 1696, he travelled with William Paterson to Holland and Hamburg in an attempt to raise additional capital and help further the continental business of the company.

== Family ==
Erskine was married four times. He married as his first wife Jane, daughter of William Mure of Caldwell, in 1690. After Jane's early death the same year he married as his second wife Anna, daughter of Sir William Dundas of Kincavel. They had six sons and a daughter. One of his sons was the great jurist John Erskine of Carnock, father to John Erskine DD, leader of the Evangelical Party in the 18th-century Scottish Church. After Anna's death in June 1723 he married thirdly Lilias, daughter of Sir George Stirling of Keir and widow of John Murray, in 1725. There were no children from this marriage. After Lilias's death in March 1729, he married as his fourth wife Mary, daughter of Charles Stewart of Duncarn, in November 1729. They had at least one son, Charles, who died unmarried. Erskine died in Edinburgh on 13 January 1743, aged 80. His fourth wife died in September 1772.
