= Claudius James Erskine =

British Indian judge and educator

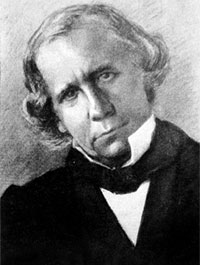
Claudius James Erskine

Claudius James Erskine, known as Claude Erskine (1821 – 6 June 1893) ICS, was a British Indian civil servant, judge and vice-chancellor of the University of Calcutta.

== Early life and education ==
The son of William Erskine, Claude Erskine was born in 1821 in Bombay Presidency. He studied at the University of St Andrews, the University of Edinburgh, and the East India College, Haileybury.

== Career ==
He joined the Indian Civil Service, one of four brothers to do so, arriving in Bombay in 1840. He was appointed private secretary to the Governor of Bombay, Sir George Arthur, in 1843, and became oriental translator and deputy secretary in the Persian department.

Interested in vernacular education, he became, after serving as secretary to the Bombay general and judicial departments, the first director of public instruction in western India in 1885. He was judge of Konkan in 1859, and a member of the Legislative Council of India in 1860. He served as Judge of the Bombay High Court since 1862 to 1865. He was appointed a member of the Bombay council in 1865. After William Ritchie he was appointed a vice-chancellor of the Calcutta University on 8 April 1862. Erskine retired from the civil service on 14 May 1867.

== Personal life ==
He married in 1847, Emily Georgina Reid, daughter of Lestock Reid, acting governor of Bombay.
