= William Erskine (historian) =

Scottish orientalist and historian (1773–1852)

- Born: 8 November 1773; Edinburgh, Scotland
- Died: 28 May 1852 (aged 78); Edinburgh, Scotland

Academic background
- Education: Royal High School, Edinburgh
- Alma mater: University of Edinburgh

Academic work
- Discipline: Orientalism

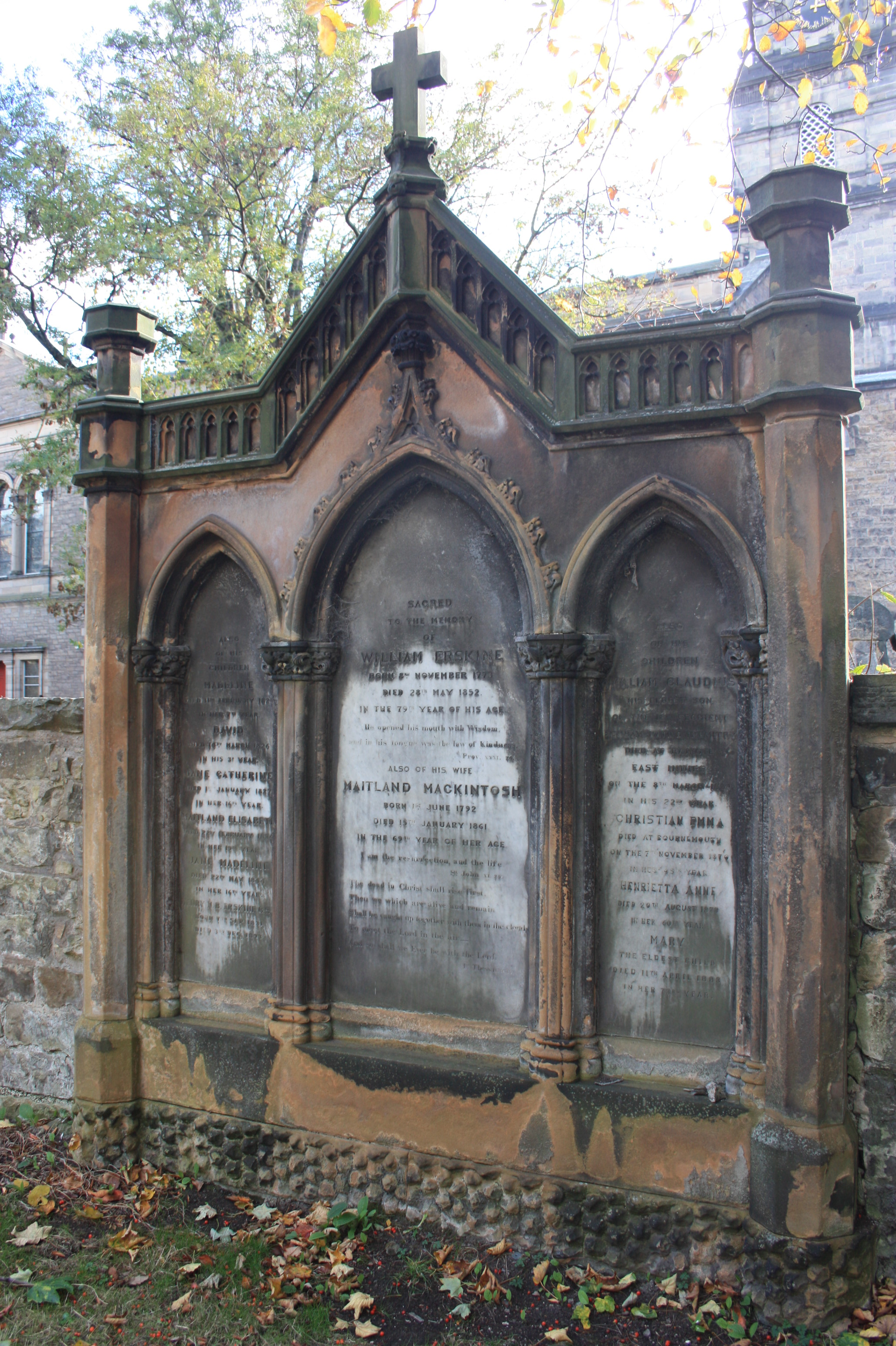
The grave of William Erskine, St John's Church, Edinburgh.

William Erskine (8 November 1773 – 28 May 1852) was a Scottish orientalist and historian.

== Life ==
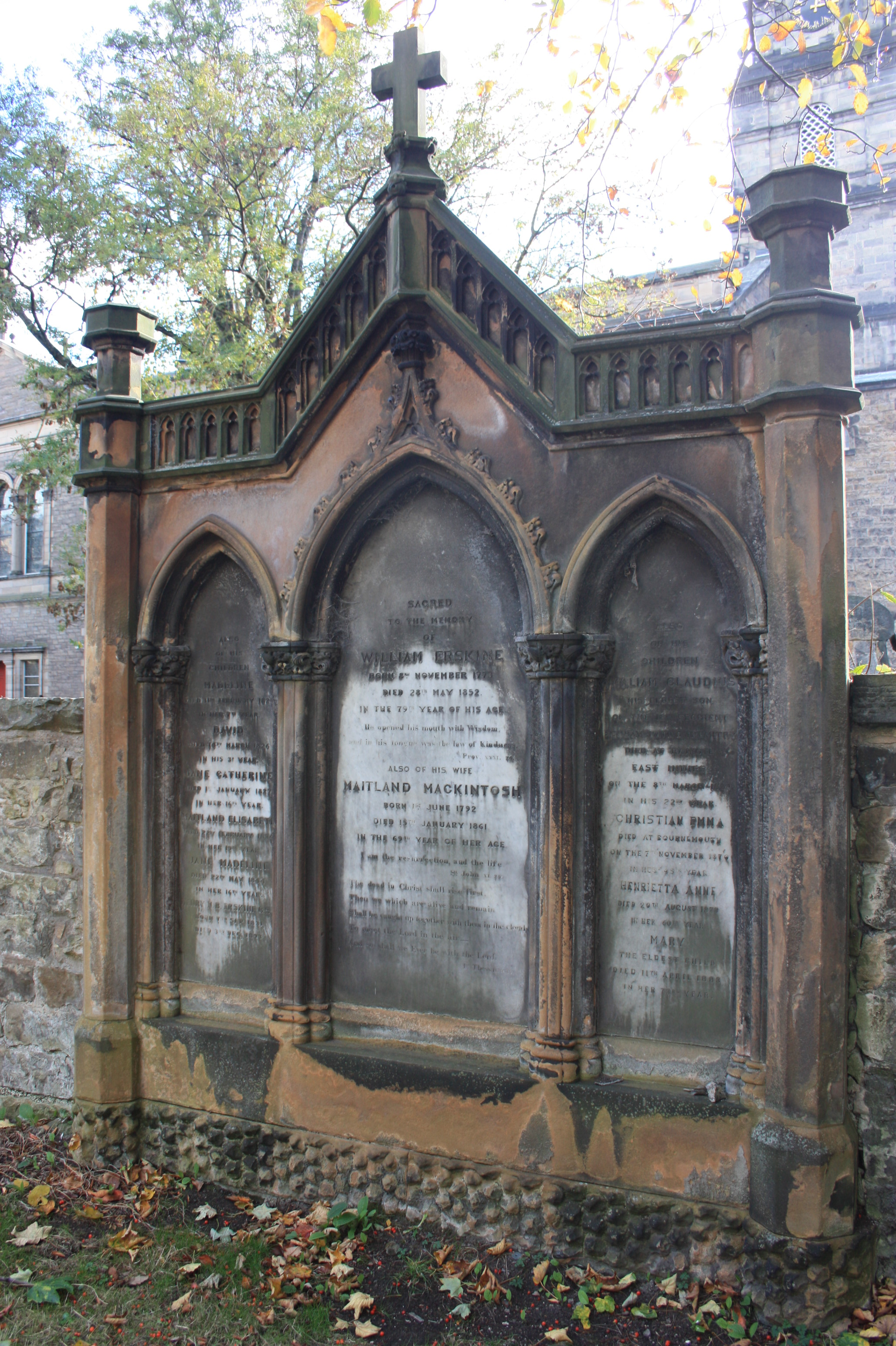
The grave of William Erskine, St John's Church, Edinburgh

He was born at Argyle Square in Edinburgh the son of David Erskine, a lawyer and Clerk to the Signet, and his wife Jean Melvin. He attended the High School, then the University of Edinburgh, before being apprenticed to James Dundas, a writer to the signet.

He went to Bombay (now Mumbai) at the invitation of Sir James Mackintosh in 1804 where he was master in equity in the recorder's court.

In 1809 in Madras (now Chennai), Erskine married Maitland Mackintosh (1792-1861), daughter of Mackintosh and his first wife Katherine Stuart. They had 14 children, one of whom, Frances, married the statistician and civil servant Thomas Farrer, 1st Baron Farrer. Another daughter, Mary, was head nurse in the Naval Hospital at Therapia during the Crimean War, and looked after Florence Nightingale while she recovered from illness.

Four of his sons entered the Indian Civil Service, including Claudius James [Claude] Erskine (1821–1893) and Henry Napier Bruce Erskine (1831–1893).

Erskine wrote principally on mediaeval India, but he also completed John Malcolm's biography of Clive of India after Malcolm's death and translated the Baburnama, the memoirs of Zehir-Ed-Din Muhammed Babur, Emperor of Hindustan.

He was removed from office in 1823 by Sir Edward West after being accused of defalcation (misappropriation of funds) and for many of his later years resided in Edinburgh, as well as Pau in South West France. He was Provost of St Andrews in 1836.

He died at 28 Regent Terrace on Calton Hill in Edinburgh. He is buried with his family on the lower south terrace of the churchyard of St John's, Edinburgh.
