= Henry Erskine =

Henry Erskine may refer to:

- Henry Erskine, Master of Cardross (died 1628), Scottish landowner
- Henry Erskine (minister) (1624–1696), Scottish Presbyterian minister
- Henry Erskine, 3rd Lord Cardross (1650–1693), covenanter
- Sir Henry Erskine, 5th Baronet (c. 1710–1765), member of parliament for Ayr Burghs, 1749–1754, and for Anstruther Easter Burghs, 1754–1765
- Henry Erskine, 10th Earl of Buchan (1710–1767), Scottish peer
- Henry Erskine (lawyer) (1746–1817), MP for Haddington Burghs, 1806, and for Dumfries Burgh, 1806–1807
- Henry Erskine, 12th Earl of Buchan (1783–1857)
- Henry Erskine (priest) (died 1859), second son of Lord Erskine and Anglican dean of Ripon Minster
- Henry Napier Bruce Erskine (1831–1893), member of the Indian Civil Service
- Sir (Henry) David Erskine of Cardross (1838–1921), Scottish military officer and Serjeant-at-Arms of the House of Commons
- Henry Thomas Alexander Erskine, 18th Earl of Buchan (born 1960), Scottish peer and landowner
