= John Erskine of Carnock =

Scottish jurist and professor (1695–1768)

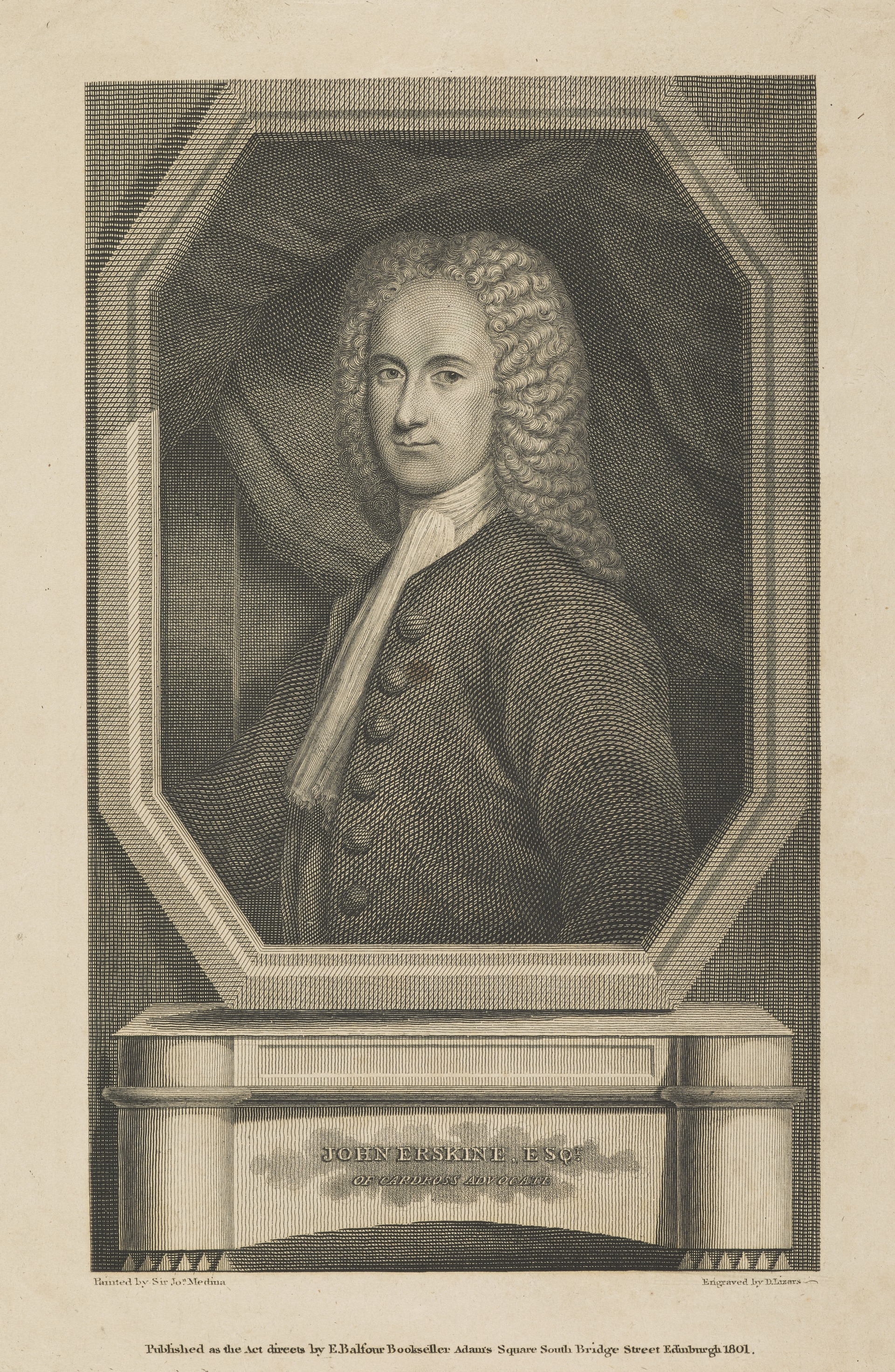
John Erskine by Daniel Lizars from National Galleries Scotland

John Erskine of Carnock (4 November 1695 – 1 March 1768) was a Scottish jurist and professor of Scottish law at the University of Edinburgh. He wrote the Principles of the Law of Scotland and An Institute of the Law of Scotland, prominent books on Scots law.

== Background ==
A member of Clan Erskine, Erskine was the eldest surviving of the six sons and single daughter of John Erskine of Cardross (1662–1743) and his second wife, Anne Dundas (d. 1723), heiress of Sir William Dundas of Kincavel. His father made his fortune by joining the army of William of Orange which invaded England in 1688. His grandson was David Erskine, 2nd Lord Cardross.

== Legal career ==
Erskine studied law and joined the Faculty of Advocates in 1719 and followed the career of an Advocate for some years, apparently with no obvious distinction. However, the post of Professor of Scots Law at the University of Edinburgh became vacant in 1737, with the death of its incumbent Alexander Bain. The university is a modern (that is, a post-Reformation) foundation, so the appointment of professors lay with the Town Council, which asked the Faculty of Advocates to suggest two names. The second was normally one who was certain to refuse, so the fact that John Erskine was the other nominee shows the esteem in which he was now held in the profession (though no doubt his connections in the Erskine and Dundas families also played their part).

Erskine was allowed £100 per annum along with student fees. Seemingly, his lectures were very popular and he decided to produce an up-to-date text for his students to replace James Dalrymple, 1st Viscount of Stair's much used Institutions of the Law of Scotland. Erskine wished to expand on the brevity of Mackenzie' work, fill in gaps and bring it up to date. Erskine's own work, Principles of the Law of Scotland, bore the imprint of Mackenzie's book in its organisation. It has been described as, “a work remarkable for its lucid arrangement, and for the terseness and clearness of its exposition of the leading principals of the law.”

Erskine retired from the professorship in 1765 and devoted himself to a new work "An Institute of the Law of Scotland." He had substantially completed this when he died on 1 March 1768, but had not brought it to full completion. This was done by "a legal friend" in consultation with other advocates. It was obviously part of one of the great Enlightenment Projects - namely the systematisation of the law. This was no mean task, but its success can be judged from the fact that it has never been out of print - though always revised - since its publication in 1773. It had, and has, its critics - there are places where its posthumous publication is all too apparent, and many felt it was far too academical (with a poor feel for the daily practice of law) but it quickly gained a reputation as a reliable reference point and, probably, no book has been cited as frequently in Scottish courts.

== Family ==
Erskine was twice married. He married as his first wife Margaret, daughter of James Melville, in 1719. Their son was the influential theologian John Erskine. He married as his second wife Anne, daughter of James Sterling of Keir, in 1729. Several descendants of his son from this marriage, James Erskine, gained distinction, including John Erskine, Sir David Erskine, Sir Arthur Erskine, Sir James Erskine and Sir George Erskine. Erskine died in March 1768, aged 72.
