= Judge Erskine =

Judge Erskine may refer to:

- Herbert Wilson Erskine (1888–1951), judge of the United States District Court for the Northern District of California
- John Erskine (judge) (1813–1895), judge of the United States District Courts for the Northern and Southern Districts of Georgia
