= Margaret Erskine (disambiguation) =

Margaret Erskine (d. c. 1572), a Scottish landowner and the mother of James Stewart, 1st Earl of Moray.

Margaret Erskine may also refer to:

- Margaret Erskine (athlete) (1925–2006), British long jumper
- Margaret Wetherby Williams (1901–1984), mystery writer who wrote as Margaret Erskine
