= Compit Educational Centre =

- Arabic: ككمبت
- Nairobi, Nairobi Central; Kenya

Information
- Type: Private primary and secondary day school
- Motto: Moalimu "Shining Star on Eastleigh"
- Religious affiliation: Islam
- Established: January 2001; 25 years ago
- Principal: Jesse Otieno Aboge
- Manager: Hassan Buule Faliir
- Enrollment: 2,800 (2010)
- Campus: 3 urban

Compit Educational Centre, or Compit for short, is a privately-operated Islamic primary and secondary day school located in Easleigh, Nairobi, Kenya.

== History ==
Compit was founded in 2001 to meet the schooling needs for ever increasing Somali immigrants in Kenya's capital.

Students at Compit are young people fleeing from war-torn areas in Somalia from places like Mogadishu, Kismayo, Bardera, Beled Haawo, Belet wayne and other large towns in the south of the country where much of the population of Somalia once lived.

== History and current student population ==
Compit started operating from rented facilities opposite from 6th Street Mosque and it grew over the years. By school year 2010, the school's student body stands at 2,800 students.

Two types of students attend Compit Educuational Centre, uniformed students and non-uniform students. High school students go to classrooms in Easleigh's section III. The two other locations; 6th street and Sunrise Shopping Centre are non-uniformed although uniformed Standard Eight classes are formed in last quarter of 2010.

== Diplomas granted ==
Primary and secondary education diplomas are granted from qualifying curriculum and policies from the Kenya Education System. Compit has been part of this process since the beginning. Primary education certificate or standard/grade 1-8 or KCPE and secondary education which is grade 9 or form II- to form IV or KCSE are granted at Compit Educational Centre graduates. Both KCPE (Kenya Certificate of Primary Education) and KCSE (Kenya Certificate for Secondary Education) are being debated about their validity according to a new education commission.

Compit is registered with a host of institutions and governmental agencies such as the Kenya Ministry of Education and Computer Society of https://web.archive.org/web/20110623100404/http://www.cskonline.org/training.html. Leaving graduation certificates such as Primary Education and Secondary Education are obtained from the Kenya Ministry of Education. Students sit on annual leaving exams of primary and secondary education which are available across Kenya.

== Location ==
For 2010 School year, Compit Educational Centre is still renting classrooms and offices from ordinary looking business places such as Sunrise Shopping Center on 2nd Avenue in Eastleigh. The original 6th street location which opened in 2011 is still being used as offices as well as classrooms.
