= Thomas Erskine =

Thomas Erskine may refer to:

- Thomas Erskine, 2nd Lord Erskine (died 1494), Scottish peer
- Thomas Erskine of Haltoun, royal secretary to James V of Scotland from 1524
- Thomas Erskine, 1st Earl of Kellie (1566–1639), Scottish peer
- Thomas Erskine, Lord Erskine (1705–1766)
- Thomas Erskine, 6th Earl of Kellie (1732–1781), British musician and composer
- Thomas Erskine, 9th Earl of Kellie (1746–1828), Scottish merchant, landowner and politician
- Thomas Erskine, 1st Baron Erskine (1750–1823), British lawyer and politician
- Thomas Erskine, 3rd Baron Erskine (1802–1877), British diplomat and peer
- Thomas Erskine (theologian) (1788–1870), Scottish revisionary and theologian
- Thomas Erskine (politician) (1917–2008), Australian politician
- Thomas Erskine (judge), English judge
