= Ilene Erskine =

Scottish artist (1933–2018)

- Born: 7 August 1933; Falkirk, Scotland
- Died: 28 December 2018; Edinburgh
- Education: Edinburgh College of Art
- Known for: Printmaking
- Notable work: Still Life with Cat, Sun Seekers

Ilene Erskine (7 August 1933 – 28 December 2018) was a Scottish educational psychologist, artist and printmaker.

== Biography ==
Erskine was born in 1933 in Falkirk, Scotland. She pursued her first career in educational psychology. Erskine returned to college to study as mature student at Edinburgh College of Art, graduating in 1991 with a BA Honors Sculpture, 36 years after graduating from University of Edinburgh . Erskine was best known as a printmaker, specialising in intaglio etching using a three-plate printing process, a technically challenging technique that creates rich depth of colour. Her subjects were mainly domestic: interiors, still lives, bric-a-brac and flowers.

Erskine was a member of the Edinburgh Printmakers Workshop and Visual Arts Scotland. Her artwork is included in at least one museum collection, at Edinburgh Printmakers.

Her work has been exhibited at the Talquhon Gallery in 1995 and again in 2007.
