= Charles Erskine =

Charles Erskine may refer to:

- Sir Charles Erskine, 1st Baronet (1643–1690), Scottish politician
- Charles Erskine, Earl of Mar (1650–1689), Scottish nobleman
- Charles Erskine, Lord Tinwald (1680–1763), Scottish judge, Lord Advocate, MP for Dumfriesshire 1722–41 and for Tain Burghs 1734–42
- Charles Erskine (1716–1749), his son, Scottish lawyer, MP for Ayr Burghs
- Charles Erskine (cardinal) (1739–1811), Italian-Scottish papal diplomat and cardinal
