= John Erskine (theologian) =

Scottish minister (1721–1803)

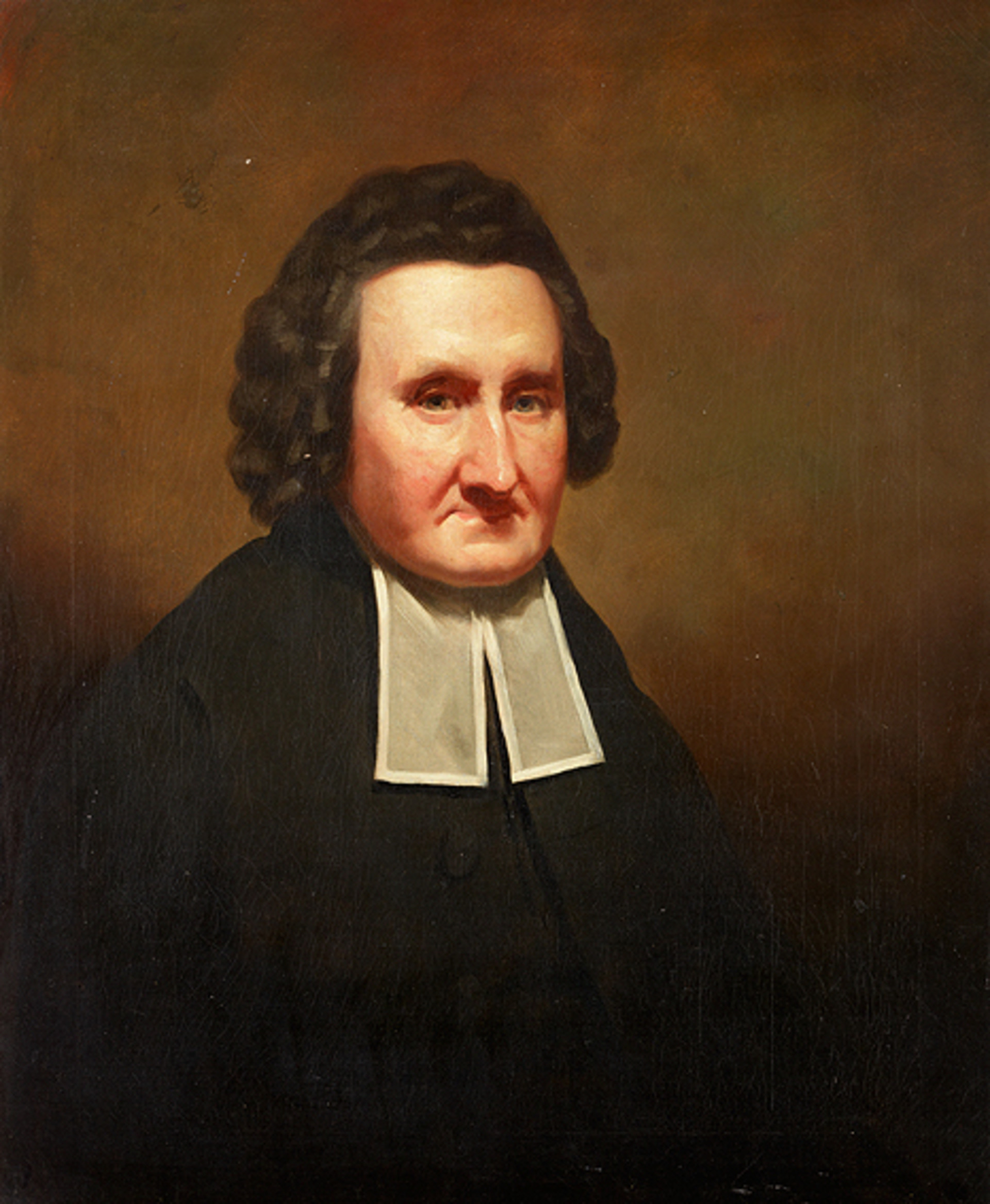
- John Erskine by Sir Henry Raeburn

Personal details
- Born: 2 June 1721
- Died: 18 January 1803 (aged 81)

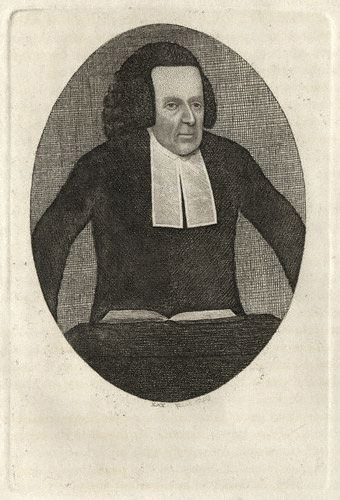
John Erskine

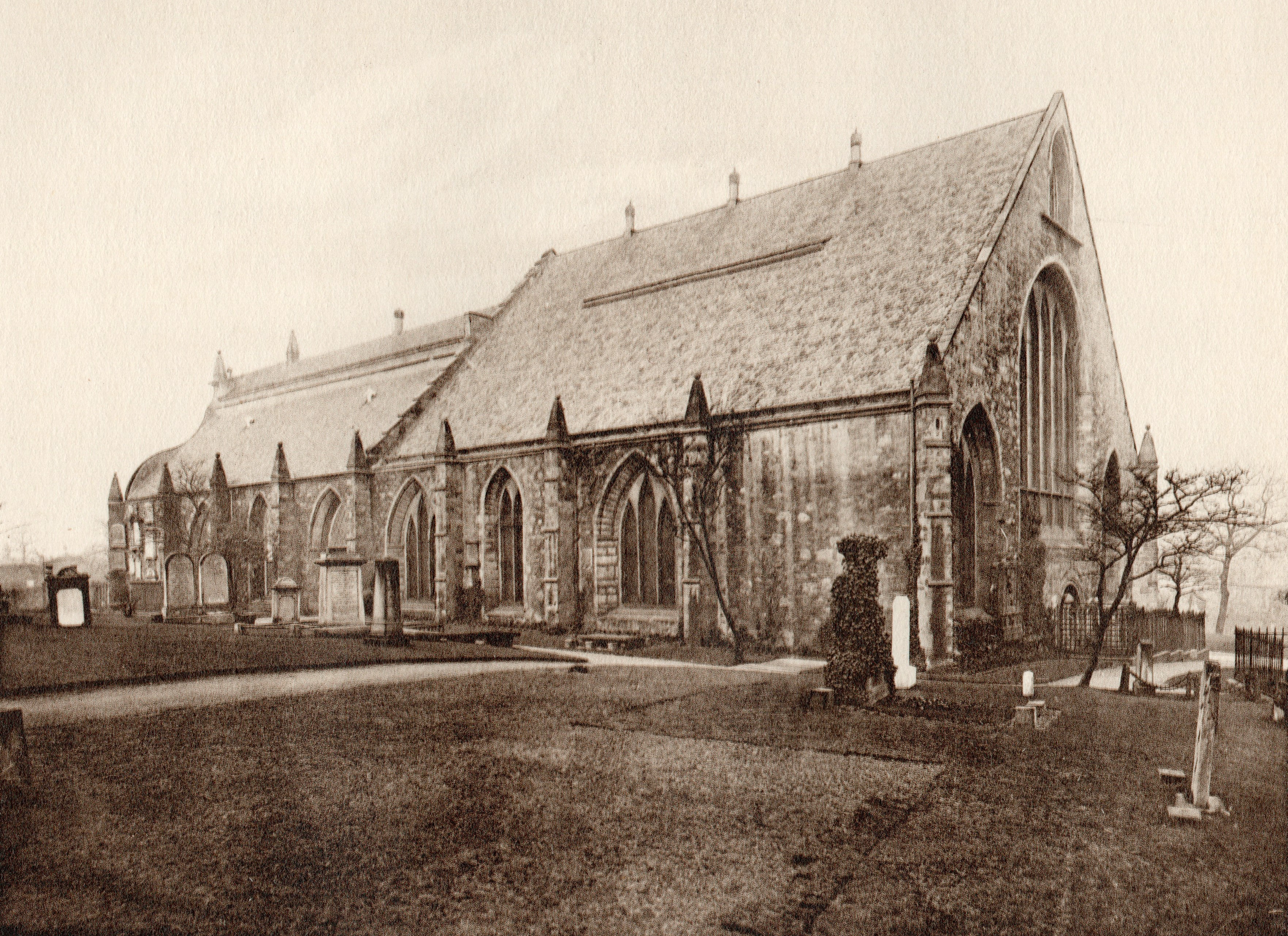
New and Old Greyfriars

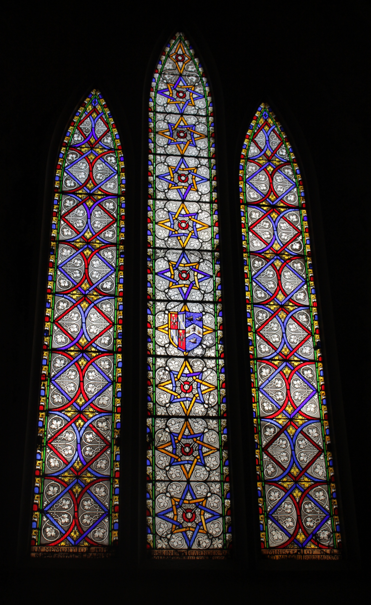
Memorial window to John Erskine, Greyfriars Kirk

John Erskine (1721–1803), the Scottish theologian, was born near Dunfermline at Carnock on 2 June 1721. His father was the great Scottish jurist John Erskine of Carnock and his grandfather was Colonel John Erskine of Cardross who had been in William of Orange's army when it invaded England in the Glorious Revolution of 1688.

== Life ==
He was born on 2 June 1721 in Carnock in Fife (near Dunfermline).

He attended school in Cupar then the High School of Edinburgh followed by an M.A. at Edinburgh University. He then studied law for a time but quickly changed course for a religious career and was eventually licensed by the Presbytery of Dunblane 16 August 1743. He was ordained parish minister of Kirkintilloch, north of Glasgow, on 31 May 1744 and subsequently translated to Culross, in Fife on 21 February 1753.

On 15 June 1758 he took up position in New Greyfriars Church, Edinburgh. Then, on 9 July 1767 he was called to Old Greyfriars Church taking up position in 1768, where he became the colleague of Principal Robertson, the historian. Here he remained until his death, which took place on 19 January 1803. Erskine's writings consist chiefly of controversial pamphlets on theological subjects. His sermons were clear, vigorous expositions of a moderate Calvinism, in which metaphysical argument and practical morality are happily blended. He was very supportive of foreign missions, which he supported in the General Assembly - famously beginning a response to an opponent of such missions "Moderator, rax me (that is, hand me) that bible". His books, etc., show him to have been very prolific and to have been keenly interested in the politics of the day. He was against Roman Catholic Emancipation and on the side of the American Colonies in their dispute with King George III. (Scottish merchants had several days' advantage in crossing the Atlantic, and colonial harbours were often crowded with Glasgow ships). He received the honorary doctorate of Doctor of Divinity from Glasgow University in 1766.

He was well connected to the great religious events of the time - for example the religious revivals in Scotland, (see The 'Cambuslang Wark'), England (Methodism)and America (The Great Awakening). He obviously thought he was living in eventful times. In church politics he was the leader of the evangelical party, often seen as opponents of the Moderate Party, though his friendship with that Party's great leader, Principal Robertson belies this simple opposition.

He was well loved and respected and was asked to preach throughout the country. Sir Walter Scott praised Erskine in his novel Guy Mannering.

He died suddenly on 18 January 1803 and is buried in Greyfriars Kirkyard. The grave lies midway along the eastern side in front of the large Kerr memorial. A memorial window was also added in Greyfriars Kirk in his name.

== Family ==
He married on 15 June 1746, the Hon. Christian Mackay (who died 20 May 1810), the fourth daughter of George Mackay, 3rd Lord Reay. They had a large family, eight sons and four daughters, many of whom died young - at least one in Bengal. His surviving heir was David Erskine of Carnock, born 18 April 1770, died 16 March 1838

His daughter, Mary Erskine, married Rev Charles Stuart of Dunearn.

== Recognition ==
A memorial window to John Erskine was erected in Greyfriars Kirk in the late 19th century.

== Bibliography ==
=== Works by John Erskine ===
- Erskine, John A fair and impartial account of the debate in the Synod of Glasgow and Air, Sixth October 1748, anent employing Mr. Whitefield. Edinburgh 1748
- Erskine, John An attempt to promote the frequent dispensing of the Lord's Supper Kilmarnock Printed and sold by J. Wilson ..., 1783
- Erskine, John Considerations on the spirit of popery, and the intended bill for the relief of papists in Scotland. 1778
- Erskine, John Discourses preached on several occasions 1801
- Erskine, John Discourses preached on several occasions. 1798
- Erskine, John Education of poor children recommended: : a sermon, preached in Lady Glenorchy's chapel, Edinburgh, 18 May 1774, before the managers of the Orphan-hospital, and published at their desire. / 1774
- Erskine, John Equity and wisdom of administration, in measures that have unhappily occasioned the American revolt, tried by the sacred oracles. 1776
- Erskine, John Fatal consequences and the general sources of anarchy. A discourse on Isaiah, xxiv. 1,-5. The substance of which was preached ... before the magistrates of Edinburgh, 2d September 1792. 1793
- Erskine, John History of the work of Redemption, containing the outlines of a body of divinity, in a method entirely new / by Jonathan Edwards; altered from the form of sermons, to that of a continued treatise by John Erskine. 1808
- Erskine, John Humble attempt to promote frequent communicating. 1749
- Erskine, John Influence of religion on national happiness. A sermon preached before the Society for propagating Christian Knowledge, ... on ... 5 January 1756. To which is annex'd, The present state of the said Society. 1756
- Erskine, John Letters chiefly written to comfort those bereaved of children or friends. Collected from books and mss. . 1803
- Erskine, John Meditations and letters of a pious youth (i.e. James Hall) lately deceas'd. : To which are prefix'd, reflections on his death and character, / by a friend in the country. 1746
- Erskine, John Ministers of the Gospel cautioned against giving offence. A sermon, 1764
- Erskine, John Mr Wesley's principles detected, or, A defence of the preface to the Edinburgh edition of Aspasio vindicated; in answer to Mr. Kershaw's Earnest appeal : to which is prefixed, the preface itself, for the use of those who have the English editions of Aspasio vindicated. Edinburgh : Printed for William Gray 1765.
- Erskine, John Narrative of the debate in the General Assembly of the Church of Scotland, 25 May 1779 : Occasioned by apprehensions of an intended repeal of the Penal Statutes against Papists.. 1780
- Erskine, John People of God consider'd as all righteous; in three sermons preach'd at Glasgow, April 1745. 1745
- Erskine, John Prayer for those in civil and military offices recommended, from a view of the influence of Providence ... a sermon. Preached before the election of the magistrates of Edinburgh, 5 October 1779 1779
- Erskine, John Qualifications necessary for teachers of Christianity. A sermon. 1750
- Erskine, John Reflections on the rise, progress, and probable consequences, of the present contentions with the colonies. By a freeholder. 1776
- Erskine, John Religious intelligence and seasonable advice from abroad from Connecticut Evangelical Magazine. Collection I-IV. 1801
- Erskine, John Reply to the religious scruples against inoculating the smallpox. : In a letter to a friend. 1791
- Erskine, John Shall I go to war with my American brethren? : a discourse addressed to all concerned in determining that important question : to which are now added a preface and appendix 1776
- Erskine, John Shall I go to war with my American brethren? : a discourse from Judges the XXth and 28th : addressed to all concerned in determining that important question 1769
- Erskine, John Sharp arrow shot against the enemies of the Reverend Mr. George Whitefield of pious remembrance; : in a letter to the author of the scurrilous Remarks lately publish'd against him. 1741
- Erskine, John Signs of the times consider'd, or, The high probability that the present appearances in New-England and the west of Scotland are a prelude to glorious things promised to the Church in the latter ages. 1742
- Erskine, John Sketches and hints of church history, and theological controversy. Chiefly translated or abridged from modern foreign writers. 1790
- Erskine, John Theological dissertations; containing, I. The nature of the Sinai Covenant. II. The character and privileges of the Apostolic Churches, with an examination of Dr. Taylor's key to the Epistles. III. The nature of saving faith. IV. The law of nature sufficiently promulgated to the heathens. V. An attempt to promote the frequent dispensing the Lord's Supper. 1765
- Erskine, John Vindication of the opposition to the late intended bill for the relief of Roman Catholics in Scotland; in which an address to the people on that subject, by the Reverend Dr. Campbell is particularly considered. 1780

==== Other ====
- Gillespie, Thomas (1708–1774) An essay on the continuance of immediate revelations of facts and future events in the Christian church / by the Reverend Mr Thomas Gillespie; with a letter on the danger of considering the influences of the Spirit as a rule of duty, by the late Reverend Mr James Cuthbert; and a preface, by John Erskine. Edinburgh 1771
- Extracts of letters (by E. Kent, Samuel Hopkins and Timothy Jones) from America, concerning the success of the gospel. Sent to a minister of the Church of Scotland [i.e. John Erskine], and published at his desire. Edinburgh 1766
- Select Discourses from the Fourth Volume of the American Preacher [compiled by David Austin] ... With a Supplement [compiled by John Erskine], containing a variety of interesting separate discourses, &c. published at different times and places in America Edinburgh 1801
- Religious intelligence and seasonable advice from abroad : concerning lay-preaching and exhortation; collection I; from the Connecticut evangelical magazine, no. 1st, 2d & 3d.; and Mr. Edwards President of Princeton College, New Jersey, his thoughts on religion, &c. Collected by John Erskine Edinburgh J.Fairbairn and Ross & Blackwood, 1801.
