= David Erskine (dramatist) =

Sir David Erskine (1772 – 22 October 1837) was a Scottish dramatist and antiquary.

== Life ==
Erskine, the natural son of David Erskine, 11th Earl of Buchan, was born in 1772. In early life, he bore a captain's commission in the 31st foot, and also belonged to the York Rangers. On the reduction of the 31st regiment, he was appointed a professor at the Royal Military College, Sandhurst. The Earl of Munster was there placed under his tuition, as were others of William IV's children, and at their request, Erskine received the honour of knighthood on 11 September 1830.

His father died in 1829 and bequeathed to him for life the whole of his unentailed estates, including Dryburgh Abbey, Berwickshire, which thenceforth became his permanent residence. Erskine, who was F.S.A. Scot., director of the Royal Academy of Edinburgh, and one of the founders of the Scottish Naval and Military Academy in that city, died on 22 October 1837, aged 65.

On 17 November 1798 he married his cousin, Elizabeth, second daughter of Thomas, lord Erskine, and after her death, 2 August 1800, he married secondly a Miss Ellis.

== Works ==
- Airyformia; or Ghosts of great note, 12mo, Kelso, 1825.
- King James the First of Scotland; a tragedy in five acts (and in verse), 12mo, Kelso, 1827. * Love amongst the Roses: or Guilford in Surrey; a military opera, in three acts (and in prose), 12mo, Kelso, 1827.
- King James the Second of Scotland, an historical drama, in five acts (and in verse), 12mo, Kelso, 1828.
- Mary, Queen of Scots; or Melrose in ancient times … an historical melo-drama (in three acts and in prose), 12mo, Edinburgh, 1829.
- Annals and Antiquities of Dryburgh, and other places on the Tweed, second edition, 12mo, Kelso, 1836.
