= Peter Erskine (artist) =

American artist

Peter Erskine (born 1941) is an American artist who specializes in creating solar spectrum environmental artworks using light.

== Life and work ==
Erskine studied Political Science at Yale University followed by Sculpture at University of Pennsylvania. He first encountered artists that used light as a medium when he moved to California in 1980. Erskine decided to combine light art with politics and highlight the growing environmental crisis, such as the destruction of the ozone layer and global warming. His work attempts to reveal the power and beauty of the sun, as well as humanity's precarious relationship with it. He uses prisms to allow the sun's light to be appreciated without having to look directly at it.

Erskine moved to live at the CoHo Ecovillage, Corvallis, Oregon in 2007.

=== Notable works ===
- Secrets of the Sun: Millennial Mediations, Rome, Italy (1992) - created within the Roman Markets of Trajan. Erskine used physical and computer models to plan the light effects.
- Sunrise, Essen, Germany (1999) - a heliostat was used to project light onto the city's Zollverein Coking Plant (now a museum).
- New Light on Rome, Rome, Italy (2000) - Erskine projected light through prisms onto five of Rome's most important buildings, to mark the new millennium.
- Inside a Diamond, CoHo Ecovillage, Corvallis, Oregon, USA (2011 ongoing) - light-refracting plastic panels were used to project light onto the communal spaces.
