= James Erskine =

James Erskine may refer to:

- James Erskine, 6th Earl of Buchan (died 1640)
- James Erskine, 7th Earl of Buchan (died 1664)
- Sir James Erskine, 2nd Baronet (c. 1670–1693), of the Erskine baronets
- James Erskine (Aberdeen MP) (born 1671), Scottish soldier and politician
- James Erskine, Lord Grange (1679–1754), Scottish judge and Jacobite
- James Erskine, Lord Alva (c. 1720–1796), Scottish judge, Knight Marischal
- James St Clair-Erskine, 2nd Earl of Rosslyn (1762–1837), Scottish soldier and politician
- Sir James Erskine, 3rd Baronet (1772–1825)
- Sir James Erskine (Royal Navy officer) (1838–1911), Admiral of the Fleet
- James Erskine, Earl of Mar and Kellie (born 1949), Scottish Liberal Democrat member of the House of Lords
- James Erskine (Conservative politician) (1863–1944), British Member of Parliament for Westminster St George's, 1921–1929
- James Erskine (filmmaker), British screenwriter, film director and producer

== See also ==
- James St Clair-Erskine (disambiguation)
