= Kamukunji Constituency =

Kenyan electoral constituency

Kamukunji
- constituency for the Parliament of Kenya
- Kamukunji Constituency within Nairobi City County

- Nairobi City County within Kenya
- County: Nairobi City
- Population: 268,276
- Area: 11 km^{2} (4.2 sq mi)

Current constituency
- Created: 1963
- Number of members: 1
- Party: JP
- Member of Parliament: Yusuf Hassan Abdi
- Wards: 5

Kamukunji Constituency is an electoral constituency in Kenya, one of the seventeen constituencies of Nairobi County, encompassing central to eastern areas of Nairobi. Kamukunji constituency had common boundaries with Pumwani Division. The entire constituency is located within Nairobi City County area. The constituency has an area of 8.80 km^{2} (3.4 sq mi). The constituency was originally what was known as Nairobi Central Constituency at the 1963 elections. The current constituency boundaries were revised prior to the 2013 elections. It borders Starehe Constituency to the west, Makadara to the south, Embakasi West Constituency to the east, and Mathare Constituency to the north.

Prominent politician Tom Mboya was the first Member of Parliament (MP) from this constituency. He was assassinated in 1969.

== Members of Parliament ==
| Elections | MP | Party | Notes |
|---|---|---|---|
| 1963 | Tom Mboya | KANU | |
| 1969 | Maina Wanjigi | KANU | One-party system |
| 1974 | Maina Wanjigi | KANU | One-party system |
| 1979 | Philip Nicholas Gor | KANU | One-party system |
| 1983 | Maina Wanjigi | KANU | One-party system |
| 1988 | Maina Wanjigi | KANU | One-party system |
| 1992 | George Nthenge | FORD-Asili | |
| 1997 | Norman Nyagah | Democratic Party | |
| 2002 | Norman Nyagah | NARC | |
| 2007 | Simon Mbugua | PNU | Results were not declared until August 2008 due to a court case. However, he eventually lost the seat as the election was annulled by a court in January 2011 |
| 2011 | Yusuf Hassan Abdi | PNU | By-election 18 August 2011: Yusuf Hassan (PNU – 19,030), Jonny Ibrahim (ODM – 15,476), Brian Weke (Narc-Kenya – 4,064) |
| 2013 | Yusuf Hassan Abdi | TNA | Election 4 March 2013 |
| 2017 | Yusuf Hassan Abdi | Jubilee Party | Elections were held on 8 August 2017 |
| 2022 | Yusuf Hassan Abdi | Jubilee Party | 2022 Kenyan general election |

== Wards ==
After the promulgation of the 2010 constitution and the implementation of devolution, the 2013 elections led to a revision of Kamukunji Constituency's boundaries. This revision reduced the number of wards to five and created new ones, namely; California, Eastleigh North, Eastleigh South, Airbase and Pumwani wards.

Prior to 2013

| Location | Population |
|---|---|
| Bahati | 55,082 |
| Eastleigh North | 128,277 |
| Eastleigh South | 94,138 |
| Kamukunji | 35,851 |
| Pumwani | 59,616 |
| Total | 401,783 |
1999 census.

Prior to 2013

| Ward | Registered voters |
|---|---|
| Eastleigh North | 21,450 |
| Eastleigh South | 14,721 |
| Kimathi | 7,010 |
| Muthurwa/Shauri Moyo | 17,513 |
| Pumwani | 18,032 |
| Uhuru | 11,860 |
| Total | 90,586 |
*September 2005.

== Kamukunji Sub-county ==
The Sub-county shares nearly the same boundaries with what was the Pumwani Division; the division had common boundaries with Kamukunji Constituency prior to 2013. The sub-county is headquartered in Pumwani, headed by a Deputy County Commissioner, working under the Ministry of Interior.
