= George Erskine =

British Army officer (1899–1965)

General Sir George Erskine GCB KBE DSO
- Born: 23 August 1899; Hascombe, Surrey, England
- Died: 29 August 1965 (aged 66); Rusper, West Sussex, England
- Burial place: Saint Mary Magdalene Churchyard, Rusper
- Relatives: Major General George Elphinstone Erskine (father)
- Military career
- Allegiance: United Kingdom
- Branch: British Army
- Service years: 1918–1958
- Rank: General
- Nickname: "Bobby"
- Service number: 15806
- Unit: King's Royal Rifle Corps
- Commands: Southern Command (1955–1958); East Africa Command (1953–1955); Eastern Command (1952–1953); British Troops in Egypt (1949–1952); British Forces in Hong Kong (1946–1948); 43rd (Wessex) Infantry Division (1945–1946); 7th Armoured Division (1943–1944); 69th Infantry Brigade (1941–1942); 2nd Battalion, King's Royal Rifle Corps (1940–1941)
- Conflicts: First World War; Second World War; North African campaign; Italian campaign; Operation Overlord; Battle of Normandy; Battle of Ismailia; Mau Mau Uprising
- Awards: Knight Grand Cross of the Order of the Bath; Knight Commander of the Order of the British Empire; Companion of the Distinguished Service Order; Mentioned in Despatches

General Sir George Watkin Eben James Erskine, GCB, KBE, DSO (23 August 1899 – 29 August 1965) was a British Army officer from Hascombe, Surrey. After he graduated from Royal Military College, Sandhurst, Erskine was commissioned into the King's Royal Rifle Corps and saw action on the Western Front of the First World War. During the Second World War, he commanded the 7th Armoured Division from 1943 to 1944. Erksine later commanded counterinsurgency operations against the Kenya Land and Freedom Army (KLFA) during the Mau Mau rebellion.

== Early life and First World War ==
Erskine was the son of Major General George Elphinstone Erskine by his second wife Eva Constance Sarah, daughter of Canon Ebenezer Wood Edwards. He was a descendant of the noted 18th-century jurist John Erskine of Carnock.

Erskine was educated at Charterhouse School and later entered the Royal Military College, Sandhurst, and was commissioned as a second lieutenant into the King's Royal Rifle Corps (KRRC) in 1918. He served during the First World War in France and Belgium and attended the Staff College, Camberley, from 1929 to 1930. During the 1930s he served in India but returned to Britain in 1937 to become Deputy Assistant Quartermaster General at Eastern Command.

== Second World War ==
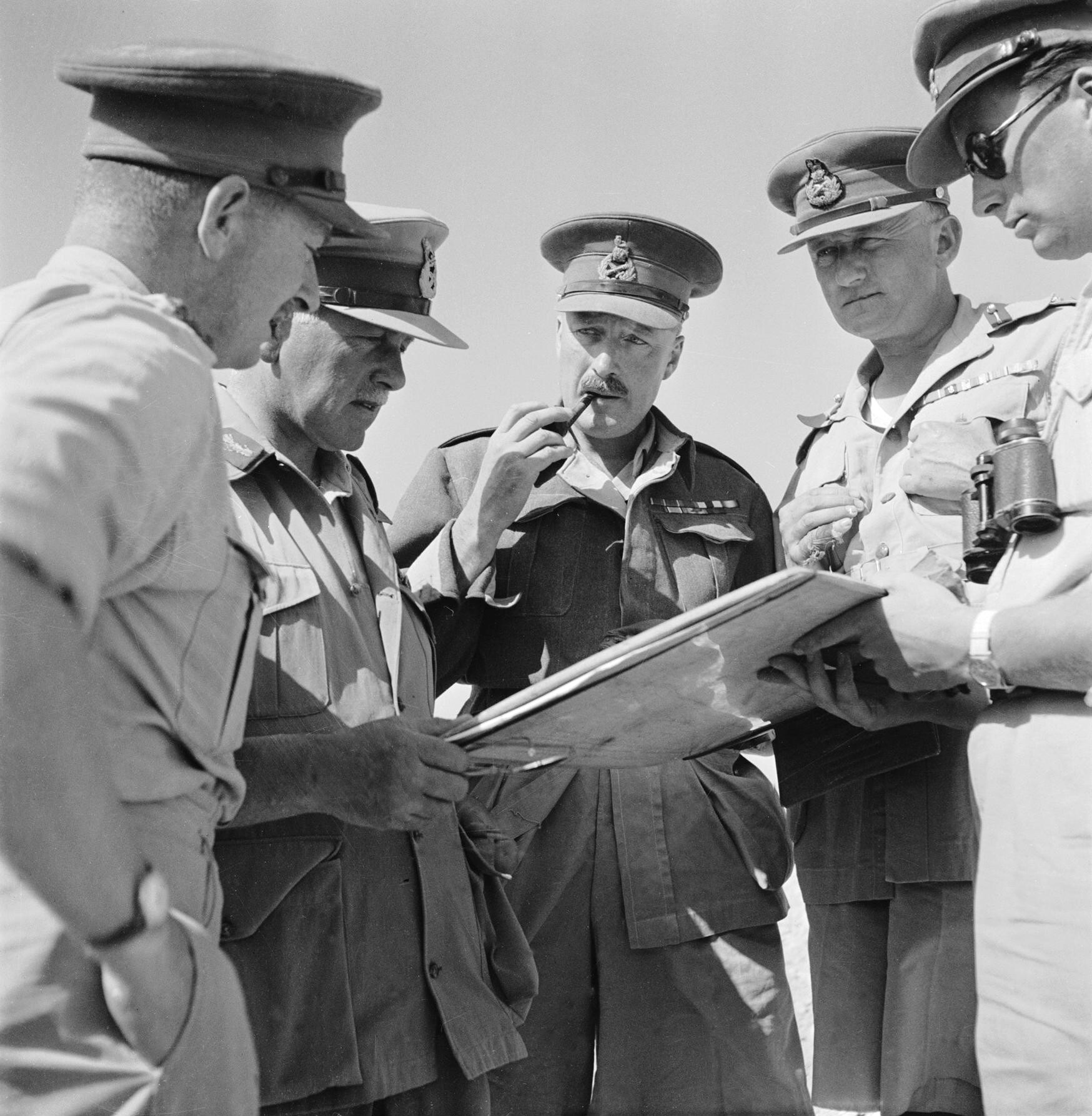
Neil Ritchie (centre, with pipe) addressing other officers in North Africa, 31 May 1942; also pictured are Willoughby Norrie, William Gott and with his back to the camera, George Erskine

In 1939 Erskine became a General Staff Officer for 1st London Division of the Territorial Army (TA). In 1941 he was appointed commanding officer of the 2nd Battalion, KRRC, which was then part of the 69th Infantry Brigade, and was sent to North Africa, where he was appointed a Companion of the Distinguished Service Order in November 1942. He served as Brigadier General Staff (BGS) of XIII Corps, commanded by William Gott, a fellow officer of the KRRC, then Brian Horrocks and Miles Dempsey in 1942. He was then promoted to acting major general on 24 January 1943 and was appointed General Officer Commanding (GOC) 7th Armoured Division. He served with the division in North Africa, Italy and Normandy between 1943 and 1944.

During the Battle of Normandy in June and July 1944, the British Second Army commander, Lieutenant General Miles Dempsey, was unimpressed with the performance of the 7th Armoured Division and the VIII Corps commander, Lieutenant General Richard O'Connor, considered Erskine's direction of the division during Operation Goodwood excessively cautious. Shortly afterwards, in the difficult bocage country during Operation Bluecoat, the 7th Armoured Division failed to gain its objectives and Erskine was sacked and replaced by Gerald Lloyd-Verney. In spite of his indifferent performance as a field commander, Erskine had qualities which suited him to other roles and this episode proved only a temporary setback to his career. He became Head of the Supreme Headquarters Allied Expeditionary Force Mission to Belgium in 1944 and then GOC 43rd (Wessex) Infantry Division in 1945.

== Later career ==
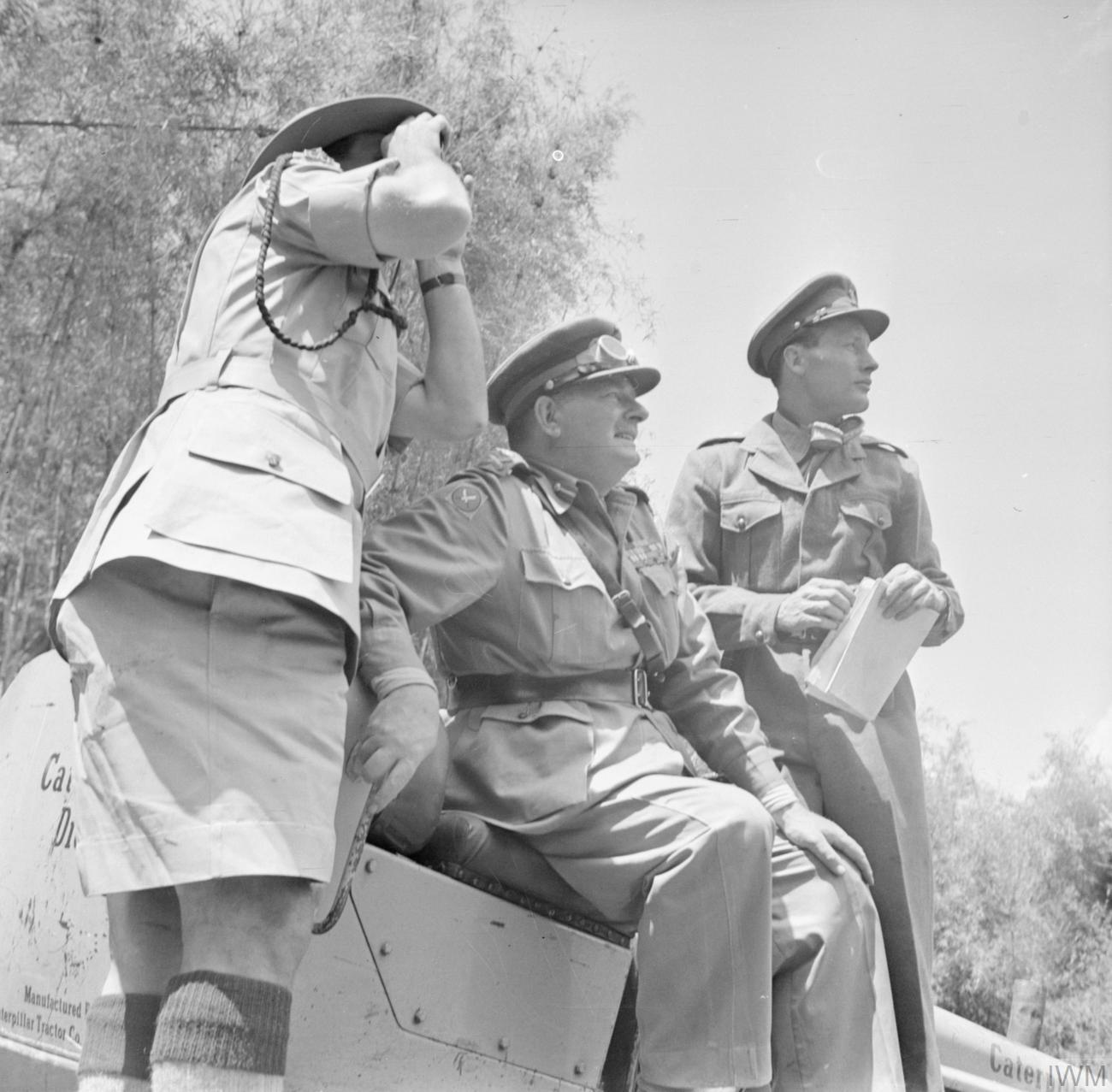
Lieutenant-General Sir George Erskine, C-in-C East Africa (centre), observing operations against the Mau Mau

After the war, Erskine was Commander of British Forces in Hong Kong in 1946, Director General of the Territorial Army 1948 to 1949 and GOC British Troops in Egypt in 1949. Returning to the United Kingdom, he became GOC-in-Chief, Eastern Command in 1952. In 1953 he was appointed GOC-in-Chief, East Africa Command where he had command of all security forces, including the colonial police. He was responsible for overseeing the response to the Mau Mau rebellion in Kenya, and led Operation Anvil in Nairobi in April 1954.

Upon taking command, Erskine issued an order that read: "I will not tolerate breaches of discipline leading to unfair treatment of anybody," and ordered that "every officer... should stamp on at once any conduct which he would be ashamed to see used against his own people." This did not stop Erskine from concealing incidents such as the Chuka massacre, though he also took steps to prosecute Major G.S.L. Griffiths, the officer responsible for the latter incident. Erskine was GOC-in-Chief, Southern Command from 1955 to 1958, when he retired.

In a letter to the British government, not made public until 2005, Erskine described his direct knowledge of atrocities committed by the security forces during the suppression of the uprising, including instances of torture and murder: "There is no doubt that in the early days... there was a great deal of indiscriminate shooting by army and police. I am quite certain prisoners were beaten to extract information. It is a short step from beating to torture and I'm now sure... that torture was a feature of many police posts." According to historian Fabian Klose, Erskine made extensive use of forced resettlement and mass internment to "break the back of the insurgency."

Erskine was appointed Knight Commander of the Order of the British Empire (KBE) in 1950, a Knight Commander of the Order of the Bath (KCB) in 1952 and a Knight Grand Cross of the Order of the Bath (GCB) in 1955.

== After retirement ==
Erskine was an Aide-de-Camp General to the Queen from 1955 to 1965. From 1958 to 1963 he was Lieutenant Governor and Commander-in-Chief of Jersey.

== Family ==
Erskine married Ruby de la Rue, daughter of Sir Evelyn de la Rue, 2nd Baronet, in 1930. They had two sons and one daughter.

Military offices
Preceded by John Harding	GOC 7th Armoured Division; 1943–1944	Succeeded by Gerald Lloyd-Verney
Preceded by Ivor Thomas	GOC 43rd (Wessex) Infantry Division; 1945–1946	Succeeded by John Churcher
Preceded by Sir Francis Festing	Commander of British Forces in Hong Kong; 1946–1948	Succeeded by Francis Matthews
Preceded by Richard Gale	GOC British Troops in Egypt; 1949–1952	Succeeded by Sir Francis Festing
Preceded by Sir Gerald Templer	GOC-in-C Eastern Command; 1952–1953	Succeeded by Sir Geoffrey Bourne
Preceded by Sir Alexander Cameron	GOC East Africa Command; 1953–1955	Succeeded by Sir Gerald Lathbury
Preceded by Sir Ernest Down	GOC-in-C Southern Command; 1955–1958	Succeeded by Sir Nigel Poett
Government offices
Preceded by Sir Gresham Nicholson	Lieutenant Governor of Jersey; 1958–1963	Succeeded by Sir Michael Villiers
