= Bahati, Nairobi =

Bahati
- Location within Kenya
- Coordinates: 1.28°S 36.85°E
- Country: Kenya
- Province: Nairobi Area

Population (2005)
  - Total: 55,082
- Time zone: UTC+3 (EAT)

Bahati is an estate in Nairobi, the capital of Kenya.

Administratively, it was a location in Pumwani division of Nairobi and Kamukunji Constituency. After the revision of constituency boundaries, Bahati was moved to Makadara Constituency.

In 2005 the Bahati location had an estimated population of 55,082.
