= George Elphinstone Erskine =

British Indian Army general (1841-1912)

- Born: 20 January 1841
- Died: 12 September 1912 (aged 71); Brighton, East Sussex, England
- Education: Bedford School
- Military career
- Relatives: General Sir George Erskine (son)
- Allegiance: United Kingdom
- Branch: British Indian Army
- Service years: 1857–1895
- Rank: Major General
- Conflicts: Indian Mutiny

Major General George Elphinstone Erskine (20 January 1841 – 12 September 1912) was a senior British Indian Army officer who served in India during the Indian Mutiny in 1857.

== Biography ==
Born on 20 January 1841, George Elphinstone Erskine was educated at Bedford School. He entered the British Indian Army in 1857 and served in India during the Indian Mutiny, between 1857 and 1858. He served on the Oudh Commission between 1863 and 1889 and was appointed commissioner to investigate landlord-tenant relations in Oudh State in 1883. He was appointed to the commission for the amalgamation of the governments of the North-Western Provinces and Oudh State in 1889.

Erskine retired in 1895 and died in Brighton on 12 September 1912.

== Family ==
Erskine married twice. His first wife was Blanche Cates, daughter of George Cates. His second wife was Eva Constance Sarah Edwards, daughter of Canon Ebenezer Wood Edwards. He had issue, three sons who all joined the army. By his first wife:

- Lieutenant Colonel Keith Erskine (1863–1914), Indian Army
- Captain Charles Ellis Hay Erskine (1866–1902), Indian Staff Corps, who died aged 36.

By his second wife he was the father of:

- General Sir George Watkin Eben James Erskine (1899–1965)
