= Bobs Creek =

Bobs Creek or Bob's Creek may refer to:

In Canada

- Bob's Creek (Ontario), a tributary of Porcupine Lake
- Bobs Creek (Ontario), a tributary of Shallow River

In the United States

- Bobs Creek (Lincoln County, Missouri)
- Bobs Creek (Meramec River), a stream in Missouri
- Bobs Creek (Pennsylvania), a tributary of Dunning Creek

In Australia

- Bobs Creek (Fitzroy River catchment), a stream in Central Queensland, of the Fitzroy River (Queensland)

== See also ==
- Bobs Brook, Delaware County, New York State, USA; a river
- The Bobs (disambiguation)
- Bob's (disambiguation)
- Bobs (disambiguation)
- Bob (disambiguation)
