= Bobs Lake =

Bobs Lake or Bob's Lake may refer to:

== Lakes in Ontario, Canada ==
- Bobs Lake (Peterson Creek), in North Frontenac, Frontenac County
- Bobs Lake (Renfrew County), in Brudenell, Lyndoch and Raglan, Renfrew County
- Bobs Lake (Shallow River), in Cochrane District
- Bobs Lake (Sudbury District), in Sudbury District
- Bobs Lake (Tay River), in Frontenac County and Lanark County
- Bob's Lake (Hastings County), in Wollaston, Hastings County
- Bob's Lake (Parry Sound District, Ontario), in geographic Patterson Township in Parry Sound District
- Bob's Lake (Timmins), in the city of Timmins, Cochrane District

== Other lakes ==
- Bobs Lake in Washington State's Alpine Lakes Wilderness

== See also ==
- The Bobs (disambiguation)
- Bob's (disambiguation)
- Bobs (disambiguation)
- Bob (disambiguation)
