= Bob's (disambiguation) =

Bob's is the first Brazilian fast food chain, founded in 1952.

Bob's may also refer to:

== Businesses ==
- Bob's Big Boy, an American restaurant chain
- Bob's-Cola, a defunct American soft drink company
- Bob's Discount Furniture, a privately owned chain in the eastern United States
- Bob's Red Mill, an Oregon-based grain company
- Bob's Stores, a defunct clothing retail chain of the United States
- Bob's Watches, an online marketplace for the resale of Rolex watches
- Bob's Famous Ice Cream, ice cream parlor in Washington D.C.

== Places ==
- Bob's Lake (disambiguation), three lakes in Ontario, Canada
- Bob's Creek (Ontario), Canada

== Other ==
- Bob's Burgers, an American animated sitcom
- Bob's Return, a racehorse

== See also ==
- The Bobs (disambiguation)
- Bobs (disambiguation)
- Bob (disambiguation)
