= 2 Bob =

2 Bob or 2 bobs may refer to:

- The Two Bobs, Vaudeville duo
- Two Bob (1933–1953), a U.S. racehorse
- Florin (British coin), the "2 bob", a pre-decimalisation coin worth 2 shillings
- 2BOB, an Australian radio station

== See also ==
- My Two Bobs, animated made-for-TV 2001 film
- Bobs (disambiguation)
- Bob (disambiguation)
