= Bobs =

Bobs may refer to:

== People ==
- Bobs Gannaway, American screenwriter, producer, director, and actor
- Bobs Cogill Haworth (1900–1988), South African-born Canadian painter and potter
- Bobs Watson (1930–1999), American actor and Methodist minister
- Bobs, a member of the musical duo Bobs & LoLo
- Frederick Roberts, 1st Earl Roberts (1832–1914), British field marshal

== Places ==
- Bobs Brook, Delaware County, New York State, USA; a river
- Bobs Creek (disambiguation)
- Bobs Island, Falkland Islands
- Bobs Knob, McDonald County, Missouri, USA; a summit
- Bobs Lake (disambiguation)

== Other ==
- Bobs Worth (2005–2022), an Irish racehorse

== See also ==
- Bobs Farm. Port Stephens, Hunter, New South Wales, Australia; a rural suburb
- Bob's (disambiguation)
- The Bobs (disambiguation)
- Bob (disambiguation)
