= Bobbing =

Bobbing can refer to multiple things:

- Bobbing, Kent
- Apple bobbing
- Bobbing (boxing) is used to dodge an opponent's punch
- John Erskine, Earl of Mar (1675–1732), Scottish Jacobite known as "Bobbing John"
- Docking, the practice of removing a portion of an animal's ears or tail.

== See also ==
- Bob (disambiguation)
- Bobb (disambiguation)
