= Bob (surname) =

Bob is the surname of:

- Adam Bob (1967–2019), American football player
- Camille Bob (1937–2015), American rhythm and blues singer and musician
- Fernando Bob (born 1988), Brazilian footballer also known as Bob
- Galina Bob (born 1984), Russian actress
- Hans-Ekkehard Bob (1917–2014), German World War II fighter ace
- Ioan Bob (1739–1830), Bishop of Făgăraş of the Romanian Greek Catholic Church from 1783 to 1830
- Jim Bob, member of Carter the Unstoppable Sex Machine
- Raphael Bob-Waksberg (born 1984), American comedian, producer, voice actor, and writer

== See also ==
- Bobb, a surname (and given name)
