= Thomas Erskine, Lord Erskine =

British politician

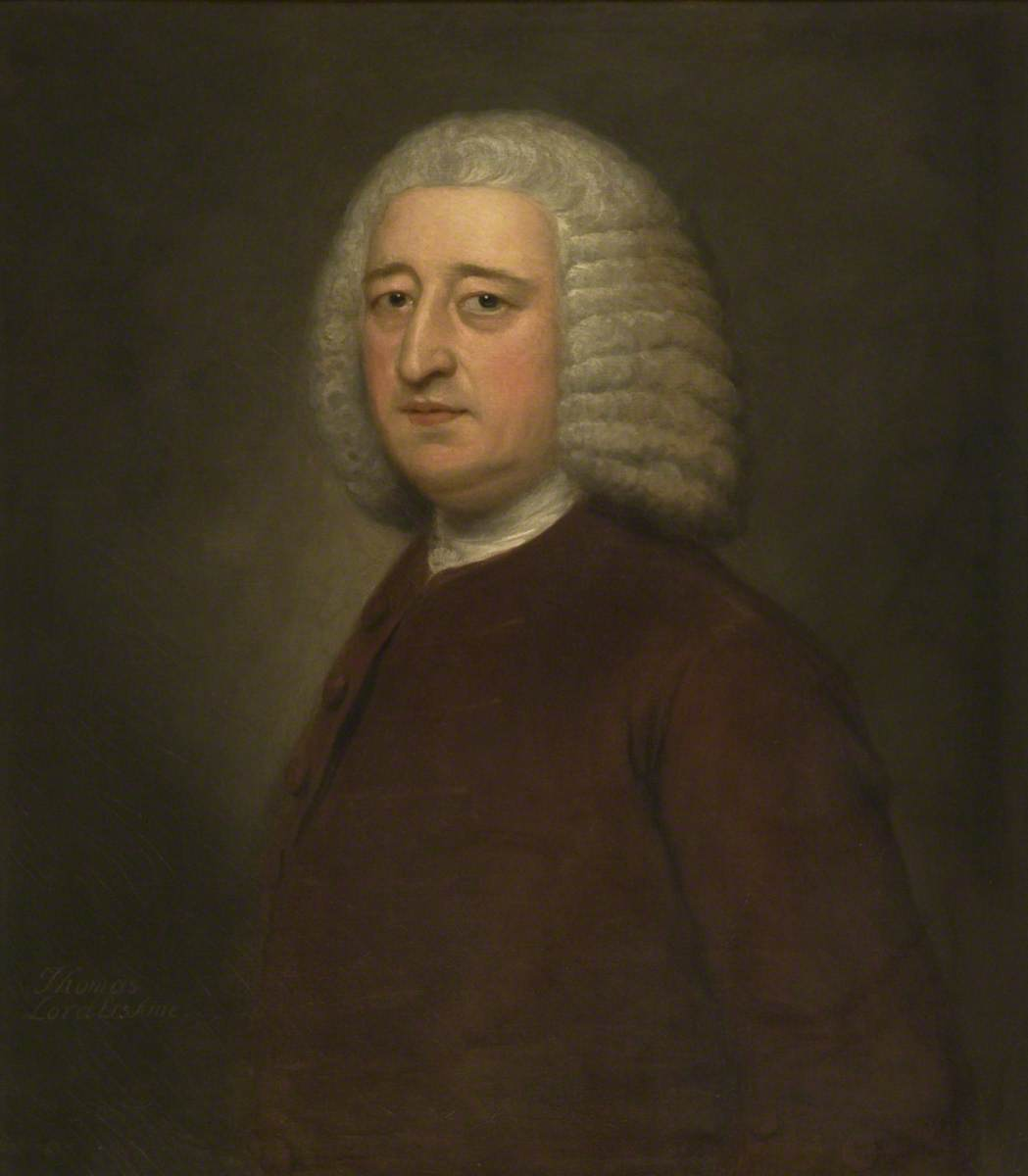
Portrait of Thomas, Lord Erskine, painted by David Allan.

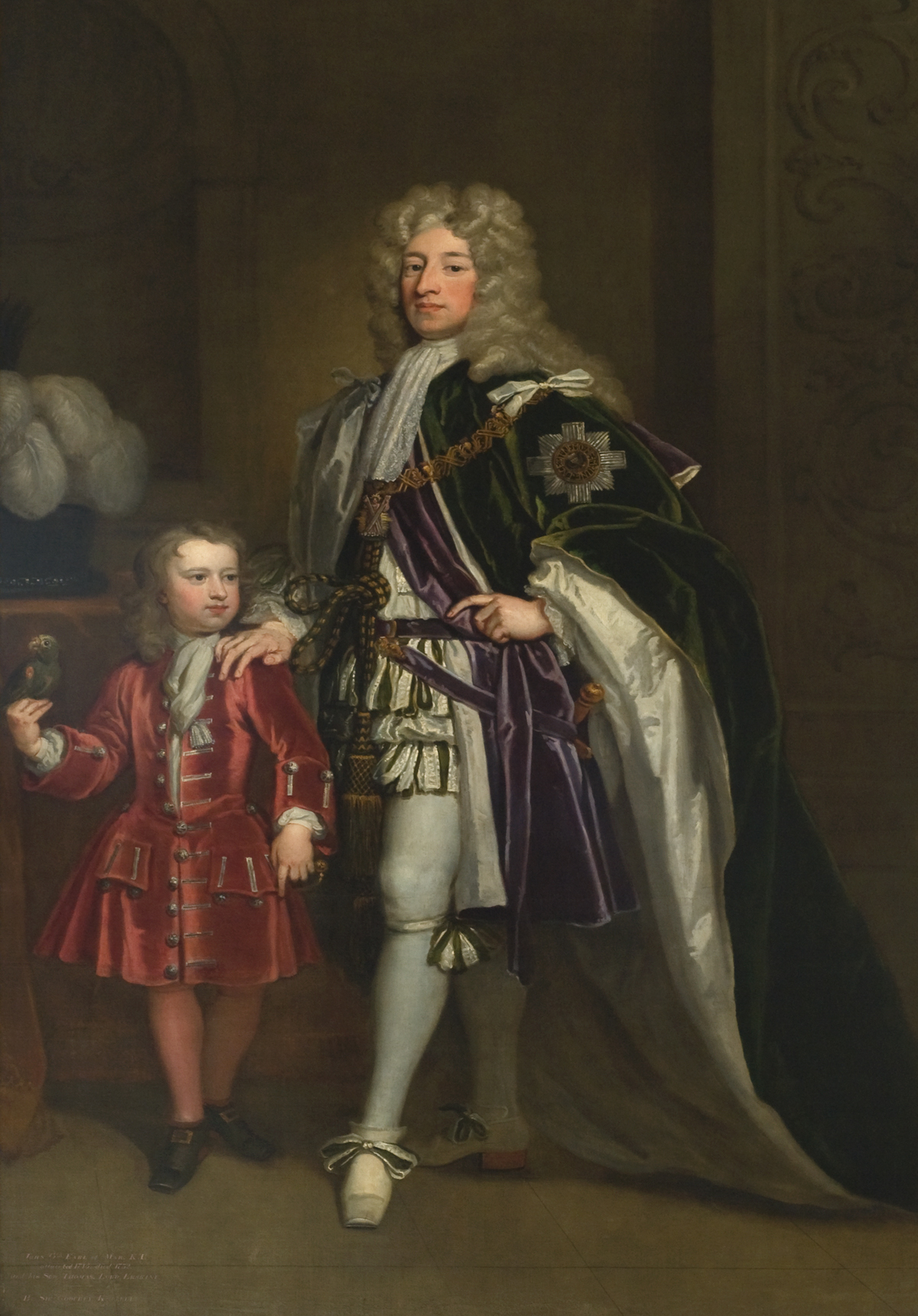
Thomas Erskine (left) could not inherit the title of Earl of Mar due to the Writ of Attainder for treason passed against his father, John (right).

Thomas Erskine, Lord Erskine (1705 – 16 March 1766) was a Scottish 18th century politician.

He was the son of John Erskine, 6th Earl of Mar. He could not inherit the title of Earl of Mar due to the Writ of Attainder for treason passed against his father in 1716 for his role in the First Jacobite Rebellion (1715).

He had a home in Broughton, Gayfield House, purchased in 1765 shortly before his death for £2,000. The house is still extant.

== Parliamentary career ==
He served as Member of Parliament for Stirling from 1728 to 1734. He was returned as Member of Parliament for Stirlingshire for the year of 1747 only. He was then elected as MP for Clackmannanshire from 1747 to 1754.

== Freemason ==
Thomas, Lord Erskine, son of John, 6th and 23rd Earl of Mar was initiated in Lodge Kilwinning Scots Arms, Edinburgh, No.3, in 1736. His name is second on the list of registrations in Grand Lodge made by Kilwinning Scots Arms in 1739. This Lodge had large military personnel and is now defunct. Lord Erskine, being under the shadow of his father's attainder, and being denied succession to the title of Earl of Mar, led the quiet life of a country gentleman and had more time to devote himself to the study of Freemasonry. He was elected Grand Master Mason of Scotland in 1749. This undoubtedly led to a quickening of interest in the Craft in Alloa. Thereafter stray names of Alloa men begin to appear in the minutes of the Lodge of Stirling. Within five years a Depute Lodge was regularly meeting in Alloa.

== Marriage ==
On 1 October 1741, he married Charlotte Hope, daughter of the Charles Hope, 1st Earl of Hopetoun. He died without issue.

== Notes ==
Parliament of Great Britain
Preceded by Henry Cunningham	Member of Parliament for Stirling Burghs; 1728–1734	Succeeded by Peter Halkett
Preceded by Lord George Graham	Member of Parliament for Stirlingshire; 1747	Succeeded by James Campbell
Vacant Title last held by James Erskine	Member of Parliament for Clackmannanshire; 1747–1754	Vacant Title next held by James Abercromby
Masonic offices
Preceded by Hugh Seton	Grand Master of the Grand Lodge of Scotland; 1749–1750	Succeeded by The Earl of Eglinton
