= Bobs Lake (Cochrane District) =

- Location of Bobs Lake in Ontario.
- Location: Ontario, Canada
- Coordinates: 48°44′36″N 80°22′33″W
- Type: Lake
- Max. length: 1.7 km (1.1 mi)
- Max. width: 0.8 km (0.50 mi)
- Surface elevation: 287 m (942 ft)

Bobs Lake is a lake in the James Bay and Abitibi River drainage basins in Cochrane District in northeastern Ontario, Canada.

The lake is about 1.7 kilometres (1.1 mi) long and 0.8 kilometres (0.5 mi) wide, lies at an elevation of 287 metres (942 ft), and is located about 25 kilometres (16 mi) northeast of the community of Monteith on Ontario Highway 11 and just 800 metres (2,625 ft) south of the Abitibi River. The primary outflow is Bobs Creek at the southeast, which flows via the Shallow River and the Black River to the Abitibi River.

A second Bobs Lake in Cochrane District, with a similarly named primary outflow Bob's Creek, and which is also in the Abitibi River drainage basin, is Bob's Lake (Timmins) (with an apostrophe) and is located 63 kilometres (39 mi) to the southwest.

== See also ==
- List of lakes in Ontario
