= Bob's Watches =

Online marketplace

- Logo
- Type: Private
- Industry: Timepieces
- Founded: United States
- Headquarters: Newport Beach, California
- Number of locations: 1
- Services: Resale
- Revenue: $45 million, USD (2018)
- Number of employees: 24 (2014); 30 (2026)
- Website: bobswatches.com

Bob's Watches is an online marketplace for the resale and trade of watches, with a focus on Rolexes. It was one of the largest watch reselling websites in the United States in 2016.

The company was founded in the mid-1990s by Bob Thompson in North Carolina as a local seller of various watch brands and models. Thompson retired in 2010 and sold the business to Paul Altieri for $8,000. Altieri relaunched the website, with a focus on reselling Rolex watches. From the beginning, its website listed the price that the company would be willing to pay for each watch alongside the price for which the company would sell the watch. In 2014 it began offering buyers and sellers of Rolex watches the ability to post selling and buying prices, creating an exchange.

From 2010 the company had a retail storefront and main offices in a small shopping center in Huntington Beach, California. In November 2018, the company moved to a retail storefront and headquarters in a 10,000 square foot, free standing office building in Newport Beach, California. Carol Altieri is Chief Operating Officer.

By 2017 grey market sales of luxury watches were "upending the global watch industry," according to Barron's; exports of new watches from Switzerland fell 10% in 2016 and there was a glut of inventory of new watches, driving prices down.

== See also ==
- Disintermediation
- Profit margin
