= Mount Bob =

Mountain in New York, United States

- Location within New York Location within the United States

Highest point
- Elevation: 2,008 feet (612 m)
- Coordinates: 42°22′32″N 74°40′18″W, 42°22′30″N 74°40′21″W

Geography
- Location: Avery James RushesHobart, New York, U.S.
- Topo map: USGS Hobart

Mount Bob is a mountain located in the Catskill Mountains of New York north of Hobart. Jaclyn Hill is north of Mount Bob and Griffin Hill is to the south.
