= Bob's-Cola =

Beverage company

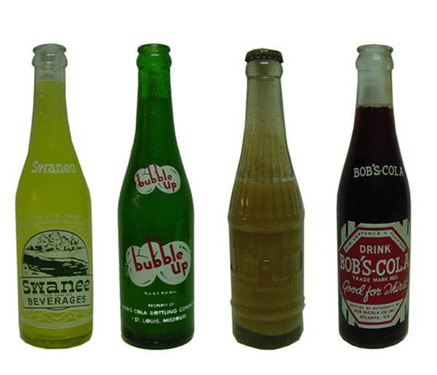
Some flavors of the Bob's-Cola lineup

Bob's-Cola was a beverage company and bottler that sold beverages in the Midwestern United States and Southeastern United States. It was founded in Atlanta in 1940 by Benjamin J. Frink.

== Name and flavors ==
There was no Bob at Bob's-Cola. The founder chose the name because "it was a good name, an easy name to remember."

The company bottled a variety of flavors, including Bob's-Cola, Swanee, Bubble-Up, and Jo-Jo chocolate drink.

== Growth and decline ==
A tin Bob's-Cola advertisement from the 1940s

Throughout the 1940s, Bob's-Cola evolved from a storefront soda shop to a major regional bottler. On May 17, 1947 Bob's-Cola opened a "state-of-the-art" $250,000 bottling plant at 865 Lee Street in Atlanta, Georgia - not far from the original soda shop. The bottling plant included both production and distribution and such amenities as a kitchen and rooftop garden.

In 1951, founder B.J. Frink died, and the cola company did not survive long after his death. By 1955 the company was sold; the Atlanta bottling plant was later demolished to make way for a mass transit station.
