= Bob's Lake (Cochrane District) =

Bobs Lake
- Location of Bobs Lake in Ontario.
- Location: Cochrane, Ontario, Canada
- Coordinates: 48°29′44″N 81°08′51″W
- Type: Lake
- Max. length: 1,500 m (4,900 ft)
- Max. width: 370 m (1,210 ft)
- Surface elevation: 281 m (922 ft)

Bob's Lake is a lake in the James Bay and Abitibi River drainage basins in the city of Timmins, Cochrane District in northeastern Ontario, Canada.

The lake is about 1,500 metres (4,921 ft) long and 370 metres (1,214 ft) wide, lies at an elevation of 281 metres (922 ft), and is located in the community of Porcupine on Ontario Highway 101. The primary inflow is an unnamed creek at the northeast, and the primary outflow is Bob's Creek at the southwest, which flows to Porcupine Lake and via the Porcupine River and the Frederick House River to the Abitibi River.

A second Bobs Lake in Cochrane District, with a similarly named primary outflow Bobs Creek, and which is also in the Abitibi River drainage basin, is Bobs Lake (Shallow River) (without the apostrophe) and is located 63 kilometres (39 mi) to the northeast.

== See also ==
- List of lakes in Ontario
