= Bobs Knob =

Mountain in United States of America

Coordinates: 36°32′25″N 94°17′41″W

Bobs Knob is a summit in McDonald County in the U.S. state of Missouri. It has an elevation of 1,106 feet (337 m).

Bobs Knob has the name of "Old Bob", a pioneer citizen.
