= Galina Bob =

Russian actress and singer (born 1984)

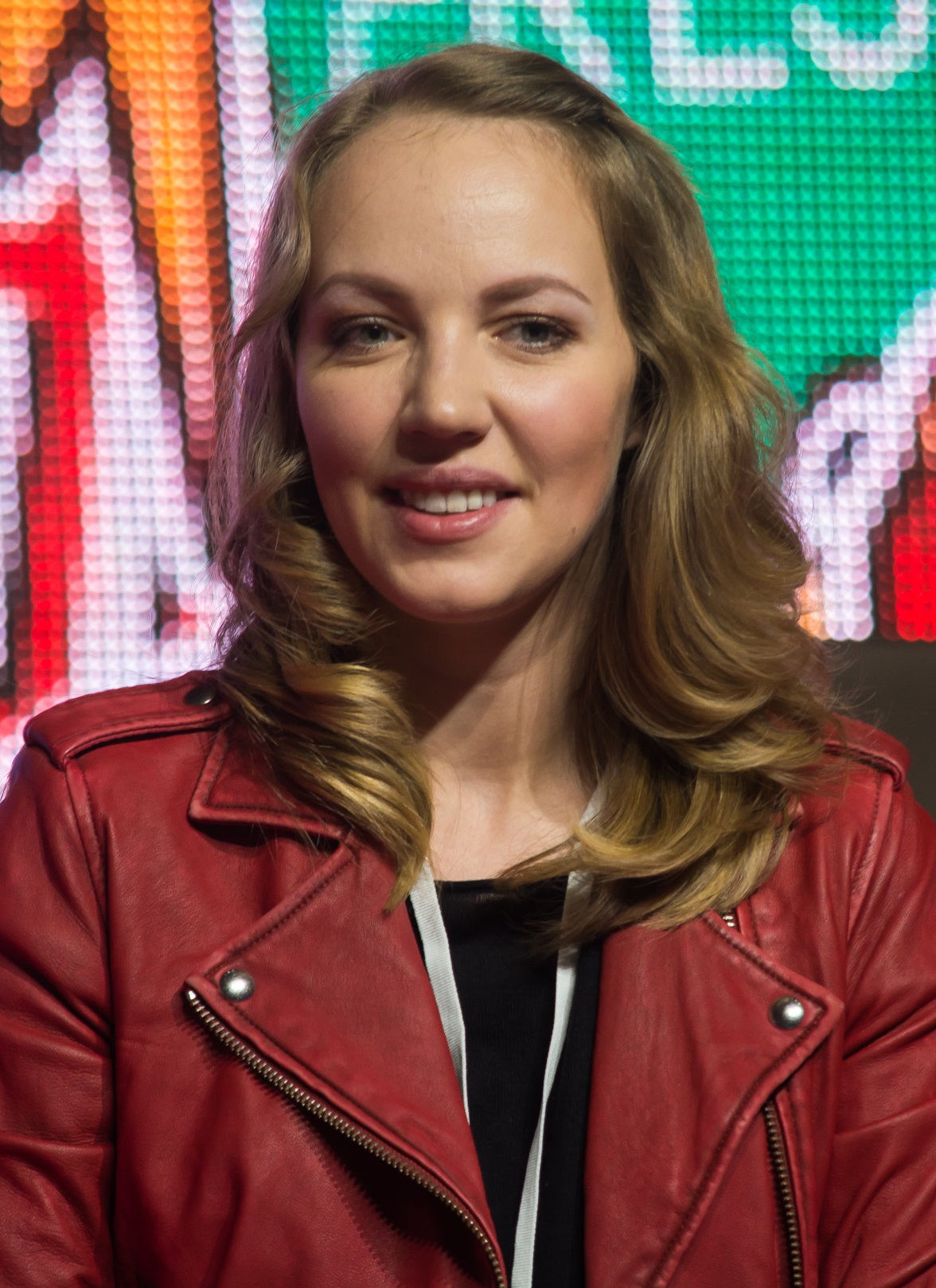
- Bob in 2016
- Born: Galina Dmitriyevna Bob; 4 November 1984 (age 41); Penza, Russian SFSR, Soviet Union
- Education: Gerasimov Institute of Cinematography
- Occupations: Actress, comedian, singer
- Years active: 2006–present
- Known for: Maria "Bobylych" Bobylkina of Deffchonki
- Parent: Dmitry Bob

Galina Dmitriyevna Bob (Russian: Гали́на Дми́триевна Боб; born 4 November 1984) is a Russian actress and singer. She is best known for her role of Maria "Bobylych" Bobylkina in the comedy television series Deffchonki, which she portrayed from 2012 to 2018.

== Personal life ==
Since September 26, 2014, Bob has been married to director Sergey Koryagin, whom she met three years before the wedding. The couple have two sons, Leo (born 20 March 2015) and Andrei (born 25 April 2017) and daughter Margarita (15 April 2021).
