= Bobs Lake (Renfrew County) =

- Location of Bobs Lake in Ontario.
- Location: Renfrew, Ontario, Canada
- Coordinates: 45°12′14″N 77°29′03″W
- Type: Lake
- Part of: Great Lakes Basin
- Max. length: 520 m (1,710 ft)
- Max. width: 350 m (1,150 ft)
- Surface elevation: 439 m (1,440 ft)

Bobs Lake is a lake in Brudenell, Lyndoch and Raglan, Renfrew County in Eastern Ontario, Canada. It is in the Saint Lawrence River drainage basin and is part of the Madawaska River system. The nearest settlement is Hardwood Lake, 4 kilometres (2 mi) to the east.

== Hydrology ==
The primary outflow, at the southeast, is an unnamed creek that leads to Hardwood Creek, which flows via Snake Creek, the Madawaska River and the Ottawa River to the Saint Lawrence River.
