= Bob's Famous Ice Cream =

Restaurant information
- Owner: Bob Weiss
- Food type: Ice cream
- Location: Washington, D.C.

Bob's Famous Ice Cream is an ice cream parlor in Washington, D.C. with other locations in the surrounding area.

== Description ==
The shop has a changing daily menu of ice cream featuring selections from over 200 flavors. Many of the flavors are considered unusual and are based on requests from customers. It is known for flavors like orange chocolate, chocolate chip, and amaretto cookie.

== History ==
The shop was founded by Bob Weiss, a lawyer from Boston. He added "Famous" to the name to distinguish it from another ice cream shop called Bob's. Weiss expanded to several shops, which became popular in the D.C. area during the 1970s and 1980s. In 1985, Bob's Famous Ice Cream opened a shop in Bethesda, Maryland. In 1991, Weiss sold his last store.
