= Bobs Creek (Ontario) =

- Location of the mouth of Bobs Creek in Ontario

Location
- Country: Canada
- Province: Ontario
- Region: Northeastern Ontario
- District: Cochrane

Physical characteristics
- Source: Bobs Lake
  - coordinates: 48°44′08″N 80°22′19″W
  - elevation: 287 m (942 ft)
- Mouth: Shallow River
  - coordinates: 48°43′06″N 80°24′02″W
  - elevation: 260 m (850 ft)
- Length: 3.3 km (2.1 mi)

Basin features
- River system: James Bay drainage basin

Bobs Creek is a river in the James Bay and Abitibi River drainage basins in Cochrane District in northeastern Ontario, Canada. It flows 3.3 kilometres (2.1 mi) from Bobs Lake to its mouth at the Shallow River.

== Course ==
Bob's Creek begins at the southeast of Bobs Lake at an elevation of 287 metres (942 ft) and flows southwest. It takes in one unnamed tributary on the left and reaches its mouth at the Shallow River at an elevation of 260 metres (853 ft). The Shallow River flows via the Black River to the Abitibi River.

== See also ==
- List of rivers of Ontario
