= Bobs Island =

- Island
- Bobs Island shown within the Falkland Islands
- Coordinates: 51°27′13″S 58°29′20″W
- Country: Falkland Islands
- Time zone: UTC−3 (FKST)
- If shown, area and population ranks are for all islands and all inhabited islands in the Falklands respectively.

Bobs Island is an island of the Falkland Islands. It is located in the western part of Salvador Water, north of East Falkland. It is located near the mouth of the Chata Creek and north of Rodeo Point.
