= The Bobs (disambiguation) =

The Bobs is a "new wave" a cappella singing group from San Francisco, California

The Bobs may also refer to:

- The Bobs (album), the self-titled 1983 debut recording of the a cappella group
- The Bobs (roller coaster), a wooden roller coaster built in 1924 at Riverview Park in Chicago
- The BOBs (weblog award), an international Weblog competition founded and sponsored by Deutsche Welle
- "the Bobs", a pair of characters in the 1999 film Office Space
- 'The Bobs', the members of the band 'Bob Vylan'
- Thunderbolt (Savin Rock), a roller coaster formerly known as "The Bobs".

== See also ==
- The Two Bobs, a Vaudeville duo
- Bob's (disambiguation)
- Bobs (disambiguation)
- Bob (disambiguation)
