= Bob's Lake (Hastings County) =

- Location of Bob's Lake in Ontario.
- Location: Wollaston, Ontario, Canada
- Coordinates: 44°52′42″N 77°56′19″W
- Type: Lake
- Part of: Great Lakes Basin
- Max. length: 210 m (690 ft)
- Max. width: 180 m (590 ft)
- Surface elevation: 340 m (1,120 ft)

Bob's Lake is a lake in Wollaston, Hastings County in Central Ontario, Canada. It is in the Great Lakes Basin and is part of the Crowe River system. The nearest settlement is Rose Island to the southwest, in the adjacent municipality of North Kawartha in Peterborough County.

== Hydrology ==
The primary outflow, at the southeast, is an unnamed creek that leads to the Crowe River. The Crowe River flows via the Trent River to Lake Ontario.

== See also ==
- List of lakes in Ontario
