= Bobs Creek (Lincoln County, Missouri) =

Stream in the American state of Missouri

Coordinates: 38.9561612°N 90.6845678°W

Bobs Creek is a stream in Lincoln County in the U.S. state of Missouri.

Bobs Creek has the name of Robert Bob, a pioneer citizen.

== See also ==
- List of rivers of Missouri
