= John Erskine, Earl of Mar (1675–1732) =

Scottish politician (1675–1732)

The Right Honourable The Earl of Mar KT
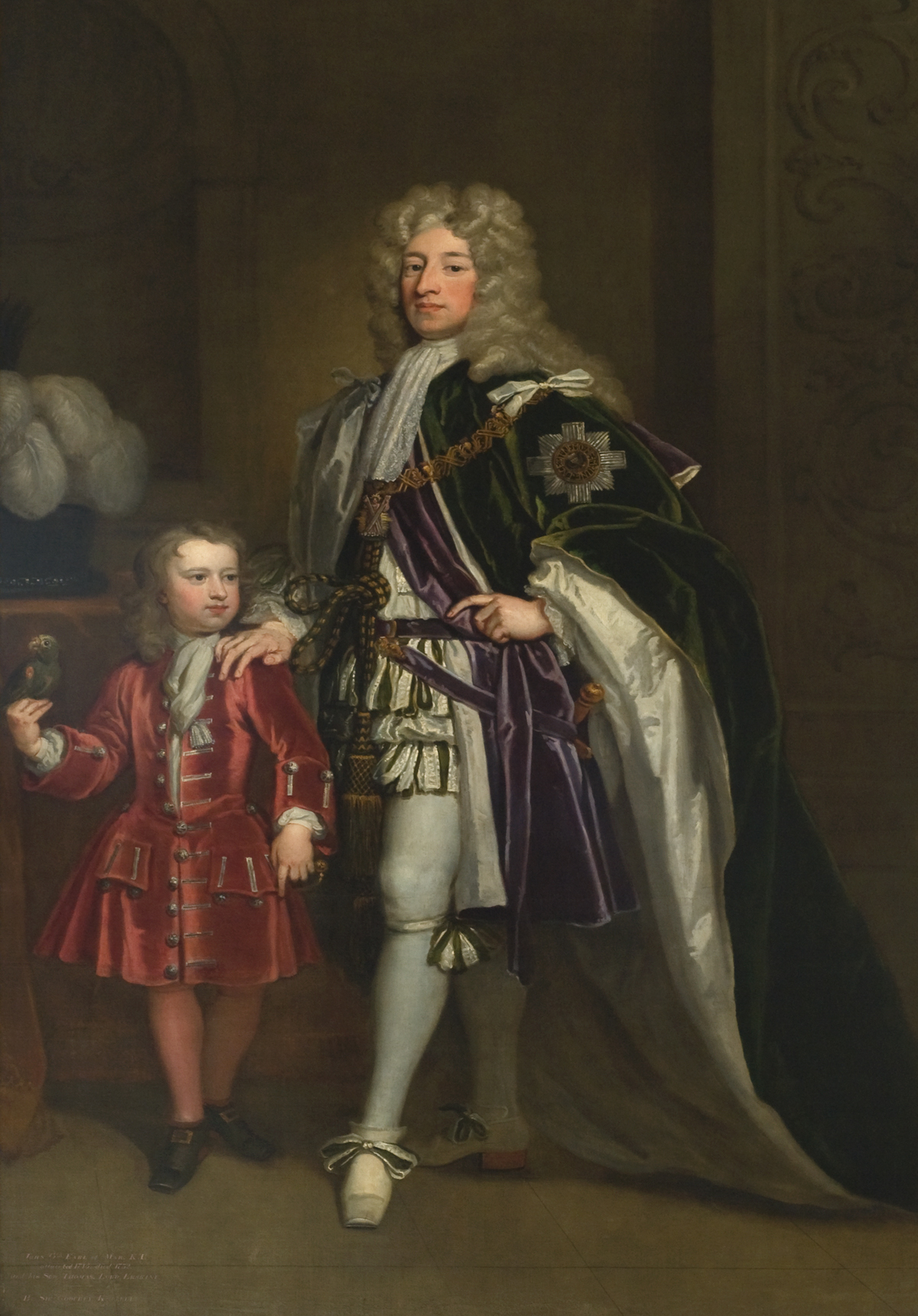
- Portrait by Sir Godfrey Kneller

Secretary of State for Scotland
- In office 1707–1709
- Monarch: Anne
- Preceded by: Office established
- Succeeded by: James Douglas, 2nd Duke of Queensberry
- In office 1713–1714
- Monarch: Anne
- Preceded by: The 2nd Duke of Queensberry
- Succeeded by: The 1st Duke of Montrose

Jacobite Secretary of State
- In office 1716–1724
- Monarch: James Francis Edward Stuart
- Preceded by: The 1st Viscount Bolingbroke
- Succeeded by: John Hay, Duke of Inverness

Personal details
- Born: 1675 Scotland
- Died: May 1732 (aged 56–57) Imperial city of Aix-la-Chapelle, Holy Roman Empire
- Spouse(s): Lady Margaret Hay (m. 1703; died 1707) Lady Frances Pierrepont
- Children: Thomas Erskine, Lord Erskine
- Parent(s): Charles Erskine, Earl of Mar; Mary Maule

Military service
- Battles/wars: Jacobite rising of 1715: Battle of Sheriffmuir

John Erskine, Earl of Mar, KT (1675 – May 1732) was a Scottish politician who was a key figure in the Jacobite movement. He held the title of the 23rd Earl of Mar from the earldom's first creation and was the sixth earl in the title's seventh creation. Erskine has been noted as a politically savvy statesman who was adept at navigating the landscape of early 18th-century British politics.

The eldest son of Charles Erskine, Earl of Mar, Erskine inherited estates mired in financial difficulties. In 1714, following the accession of George I, he found himself without an official position and subsequently championed the Jacobite cause. He raised an army to contest Hanoverian rule, commanding it against a government army at the Battle of Sheriffmuir in November 1715. Despite having a numerical advantage, the battle proved to be a strategic defeat. After suffering another defeat at Fetteresso, Erskine sought refuge in France, where he spent the remainder of his life.

Mar's involvement in the Jacobite uprising led to a writ of attainder against him for treason in 1716, though it was posthumously reversed in 1824. Erskine died in exile in 1732 in Aachen. His legacy has been associated with historical and political developments in Scotland during the early 18th century.

== Clan Mar historical background ==
The Mormaerdom of Mar, one of Scotland's seven historical provinces or kingdoms during the Pictish era, was governed by a Mormaer, an ancient Pictish title analogous to an Earl. This title, indicative of a high-ranking noble status second only to the monarchy.

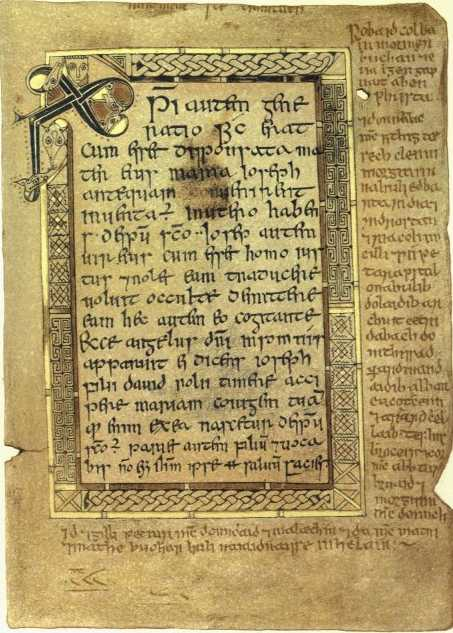
Folio 5 recto from the Book of Deer (Cambridge University Library, MS. II.6.32), Text from the Gospel of Matthew, starting at Matt. 1:18, with Chi Rho monogram. The text in the margins is amongst the oldest surviving Gaelic text from Scotland.

The House of Mar is recognised as one of Scotland's oldest noble houses, with its origins tracing back to at least the 11th century. The earldom incorporated Celtic and feudal European traditions, making it one of the most ancient hereditary titles in the British Isles. It had direct ties to the Kingdom of Mar, which was among the nine established Pictish Kingdoms. Initially, the leaders of Mar were known as "mormaors", a term signifying their elevated position in Pictish society. By the onset of the 10th century, this title evolved into the more familiar Saxon title of "earl".

The motto of Clan Erskine is Je Pense Plus (French for "I think more"). The name Erskine in Scottish Gaelic is Arascain, which translates to "air an sgian" – meaning "upon the knife." This heraldic emblem has a historical association with Longwy-sur-le-Doubs, a town in the Jura department of Bourgogne-Franche-Comté in eastern France, known for its strategic importance in the defense of the Kingdom of Burgundy.

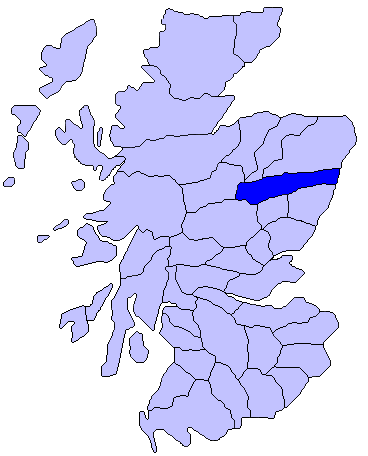
Map showing roughly the historical district of Marr in Scotland (Scottish Gaelic: Màrr).

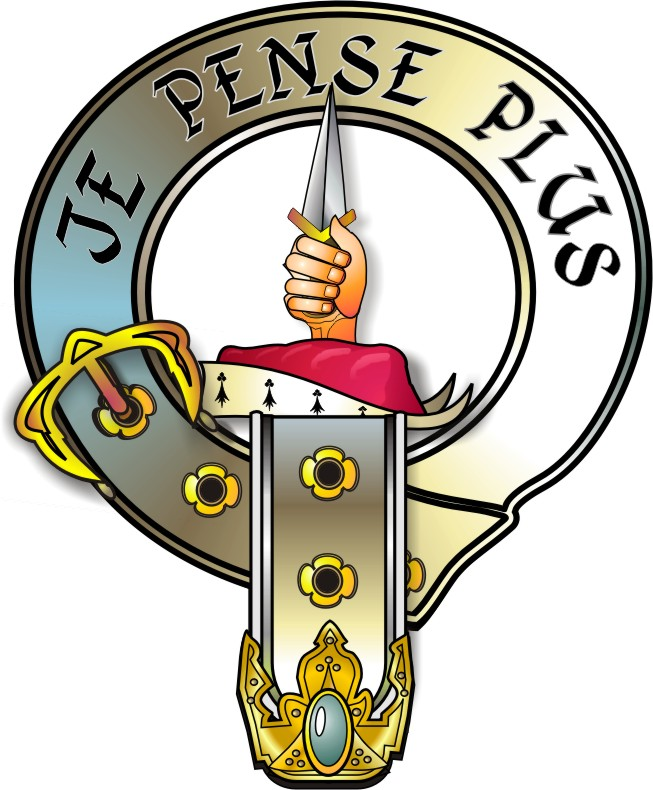
Crest: On a chapeau Gules furred Ermine a hand holding up a skene in pale Argent, hilted and pommelled Or. Erskine in Scottish Gaelic is Arascain ("air an sgian" – upon the knife).

Geographically, the Mormaerdom of Mar was situated in what is now Aberdeenshire, spanning the area between the River Dee and the River Don, extending from coastal regions to the mountainous interiors. The Earldom of Mar, as declared by the Ulster King-of-Arms, is considered one of the most ancient titles in Great Britain, and possibly even in Europe.

Mar Lodge Estate represents only a small portion of the medieval Earldom of Mar and did not reach its current size and configuration until the 20th century. After John Erskine, the 6th Earl of Mar, participated in the Jacobite Rising of 1715, the estate was forfeited in 1716, marking the end of the feudal landholding system in the Earldom of Mar. The process of resolving the forfeiture extended over many years. Today, the estate is estimated to represent 33,000 hectares of the Cairngorms National Park.

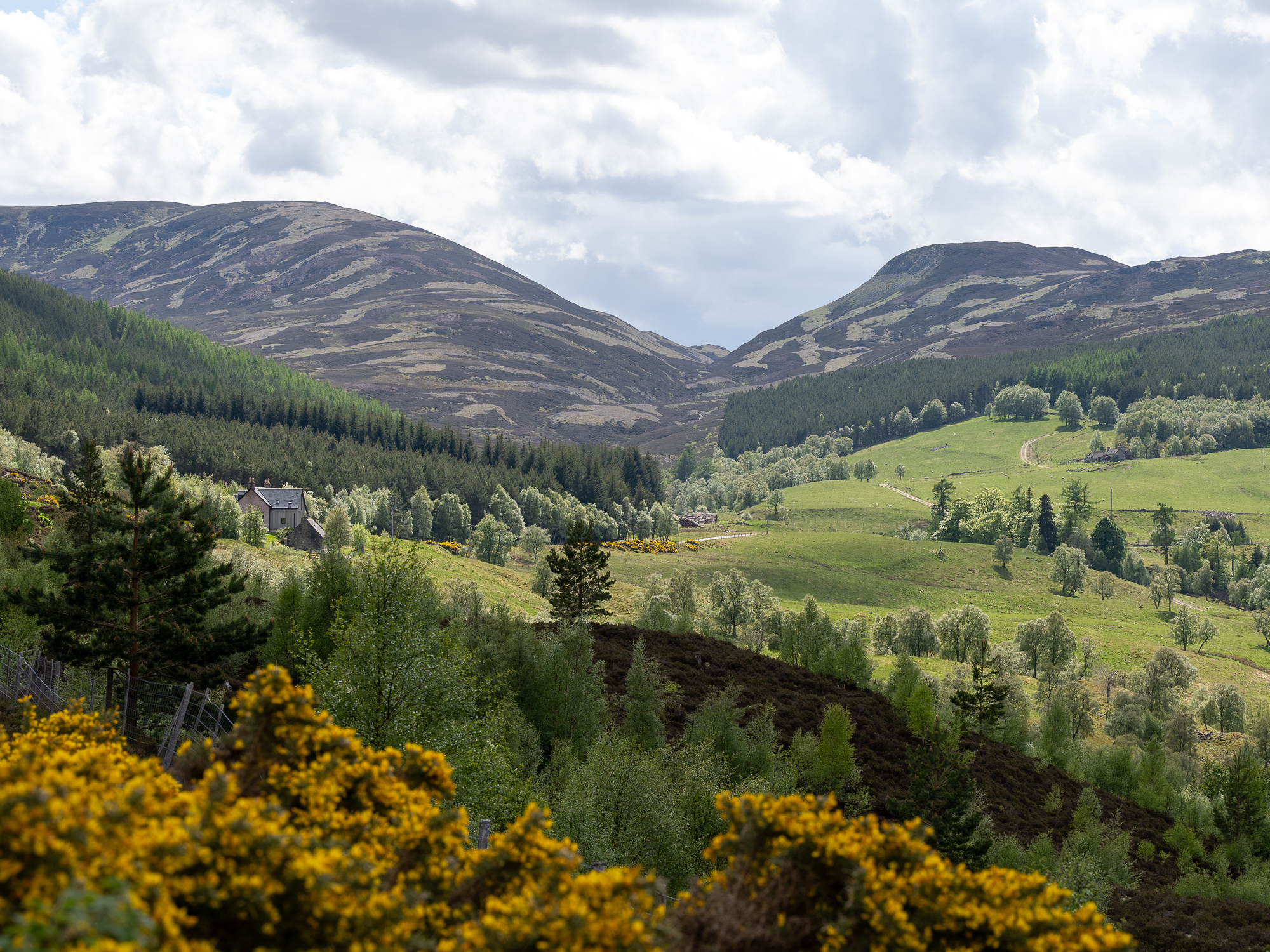
Cairngorms National Park, Scotland.

Kildrummy Castle, located near Kildrummy in Aberdeenshire, Scotland, historically served as the principal residence of the Earls of Mar.

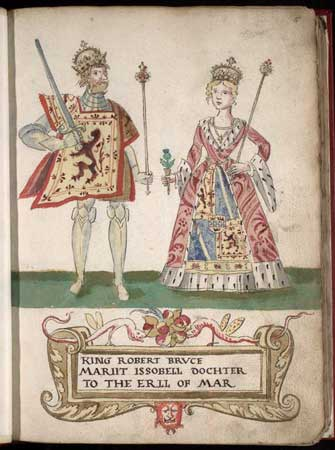
Isabella and her husband, Robert the Bruce, as depicted in the 1562 Forman Armorial. The armorial depicts her husband as King of Scotland.

The Erskine family was known for their unwavering allegiance to the Clan Bruce. A notable figure within the family, Sir Robert de Erskine, distinguished himself during his era. His prominence and trustworthiness were recognised by King David II of Scotland, son of King Robert The Bruce, who entrusted him with the important role of custodian of Stirling Castle, a key strategic stronghold in the country.

== Early life ==
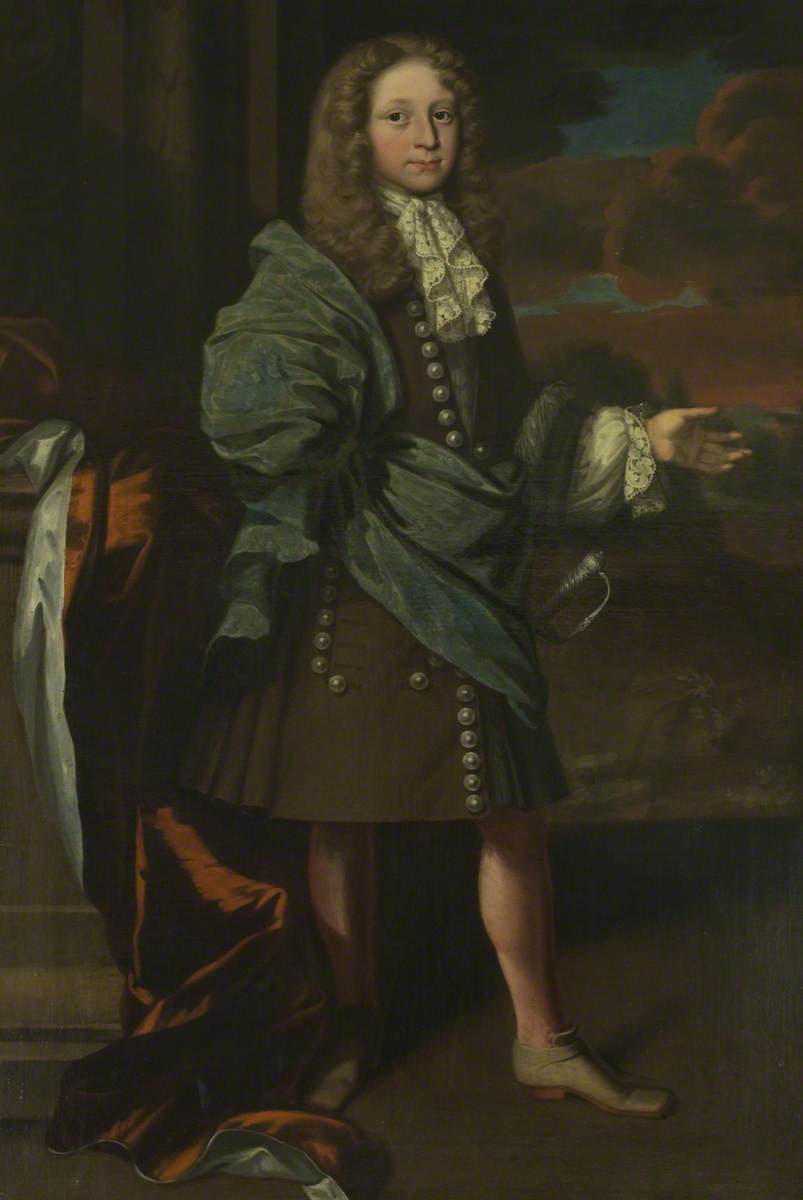
Portrait of John Erskine as a boy painted in 1690.

John Erskine, the sixth Earl of Mar, was inducted as a Knight of the Thistle on 10 August 1706, considered a prestige honour that boosted his public visibility. The Most Ancient and Most Noble Order of the Thistle, tied closely to Scotland, was reestablished in its current form in 1687 by King James VII of Scotland. King James VII declared this as a revival of an older tradition. The order is symbolized by the thistle, Scotland's national flower, and carries the motto Nemo me impune lacessit (Latin for "No one provokes me with impunity"). Historical lore, as noted in the 1687 warrant, recounts that King Achaius of Scots established the Order of the Thistle in dedication to Saint Andrew after witnessing a celestial symbol of the saint's cross during a 786 battle against Angles led by Aethelstan. According to the statutes set by James VII during the order's revival, it was to maintain the original composition of "the Sovereign and twelve Knights-Brethren", a symbolic reference to Jesus Christ and his Twelve Apostles. A notable point in the order's history involves John Erskine, the 6th Earl of Mar. He was the only member ever to be stripped of his knighthood. (Interestingly, unlike the other British orders, the statutes of the Order of the Thistle do not specify a procedure for the removal of a knight.) Nonetheless, this action was taken against him by the newly established Hanoverian dynasty, due to his involvement in the Jacobite rising of 1715.

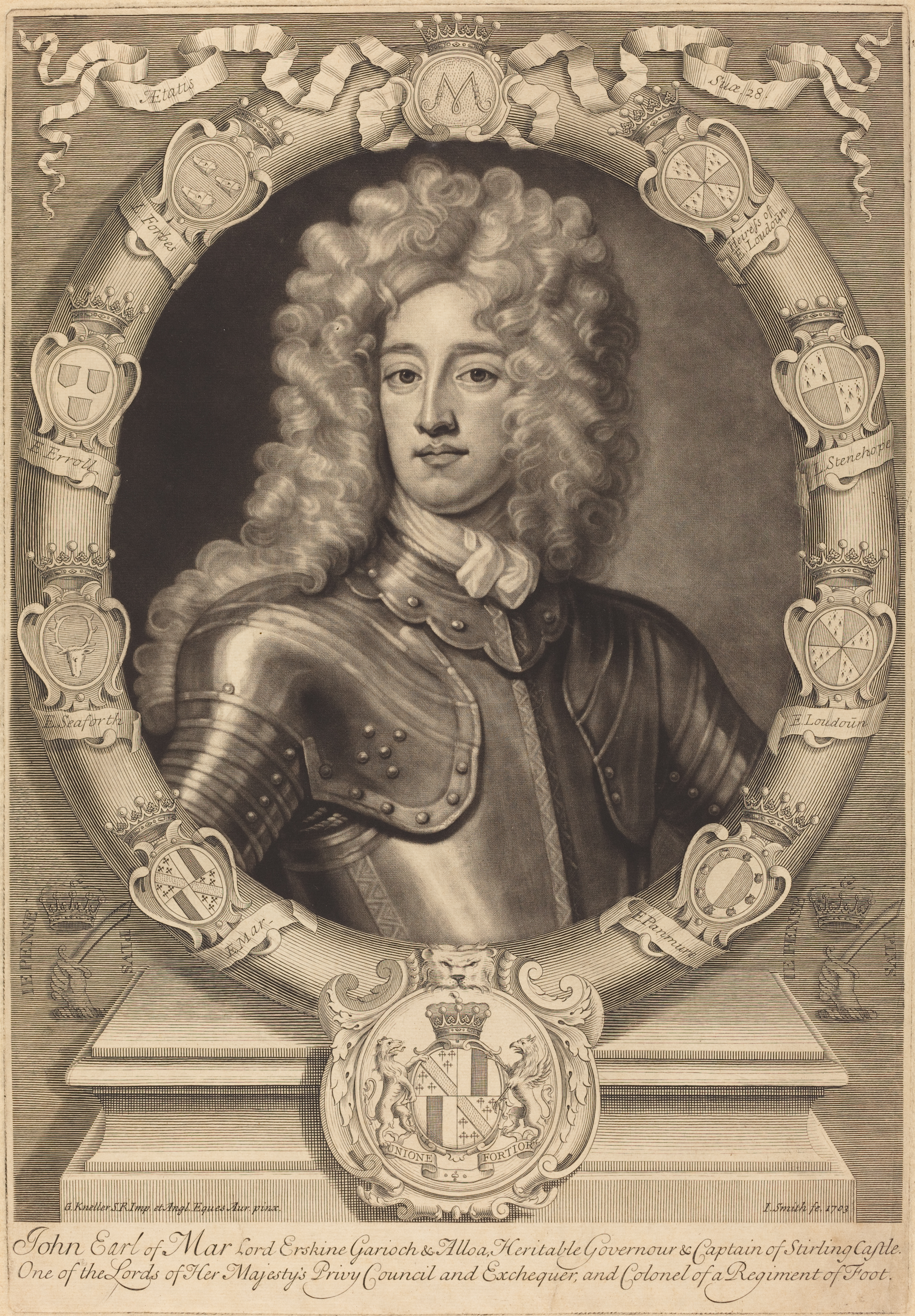
John Erskine, 22nd or 6th Earl of Mar, Heritable Governor and Captain of Stirling Castle, by John Smith, after Sir Godfrey Kneller, Bt, 1703

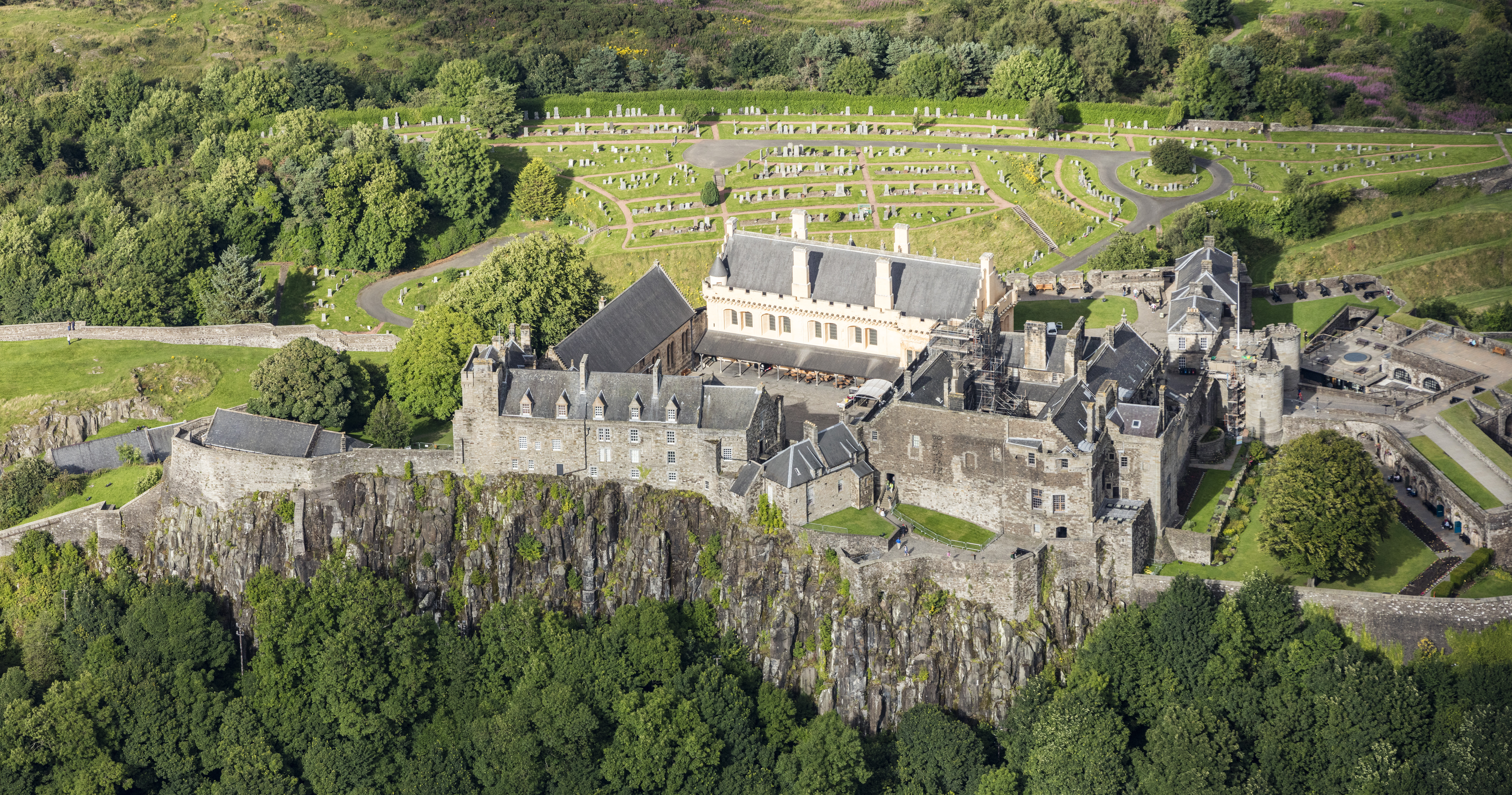
Aerial view of Stirling Castle, Great Hall

Mar was the hereditary governor of Stirling Castle. Most of the current buildings in the castle were constructed between 1490 and 1600, during which time Stirling was developed as a principal royal centre by the Stuart kings James IV, James V, and James VI. In 1709, Mar supervised repairs to the castle. He drafted a proposal for the southeast elevation, inscribing it with Justitia et patria restituta (in Latin, "Justice and country restored").

In the early 18th century, Erskine was active first in Scottish politics and subsequently, following the Union of Scotland and England, in national British politics. He was aligned with a party supportive of the government and thereby was appointed as one of the Commissioners for the Union. His subsequently was appointed as a Scottish Secretary of State. Following the Union of 1707, Mar became a representative peer for Scotland, Keeper of the Signet, and a member of the Privy Council. In 1713, under the Tory administration, he was appointed a British Secretary of State, aiming to showcase his versatility and non-partisan capability to work across party lines.

In 1714, Mar expressed loyalty to the newly crowned King George I. However, his loyalty was contingent on his desire for the dissolution of the union; Mar was willing to support George I as long as he believed the king could deliver on this goal. Despite his efforts, like many Tories at the time, he was relieved of his office. In August 1715, Mar pivoted politically towards his ethnic Scottish heritage and Jacobite sympathies. He discreetly travelled to Scotland, where he became a leading figure in the Jacobite movement supporting James Edward, (the "Old Pretender"). His shift to the Jacobite cause occurred during a period that witnessed the arrest and impeachment of Robert Harley and the exile of other notable Tories, including Lord Bolingbroke and the Duke of Ormonde.

== 1715 rising ==
In 1714, following the Elector of Hanover's ascension to the British throne after the death of Queen Anne, many of her erstwhile supporters felt estranged from the new government, including the Earl of Mar. Feeling alienated, he chose to side with the Jacobite movement. From September of that year, he began mobilizing forces for a southward march, as part of a larger strategy to unite with English Jacobite groups and ultimately aim to reinstate a Stuart monarch. It was during this period of shifting allegiances and active engagement in the Jacobite cause that his English detractors labeled him "Bobbing John", a nickname that reflected their perception of his changing loyalties.

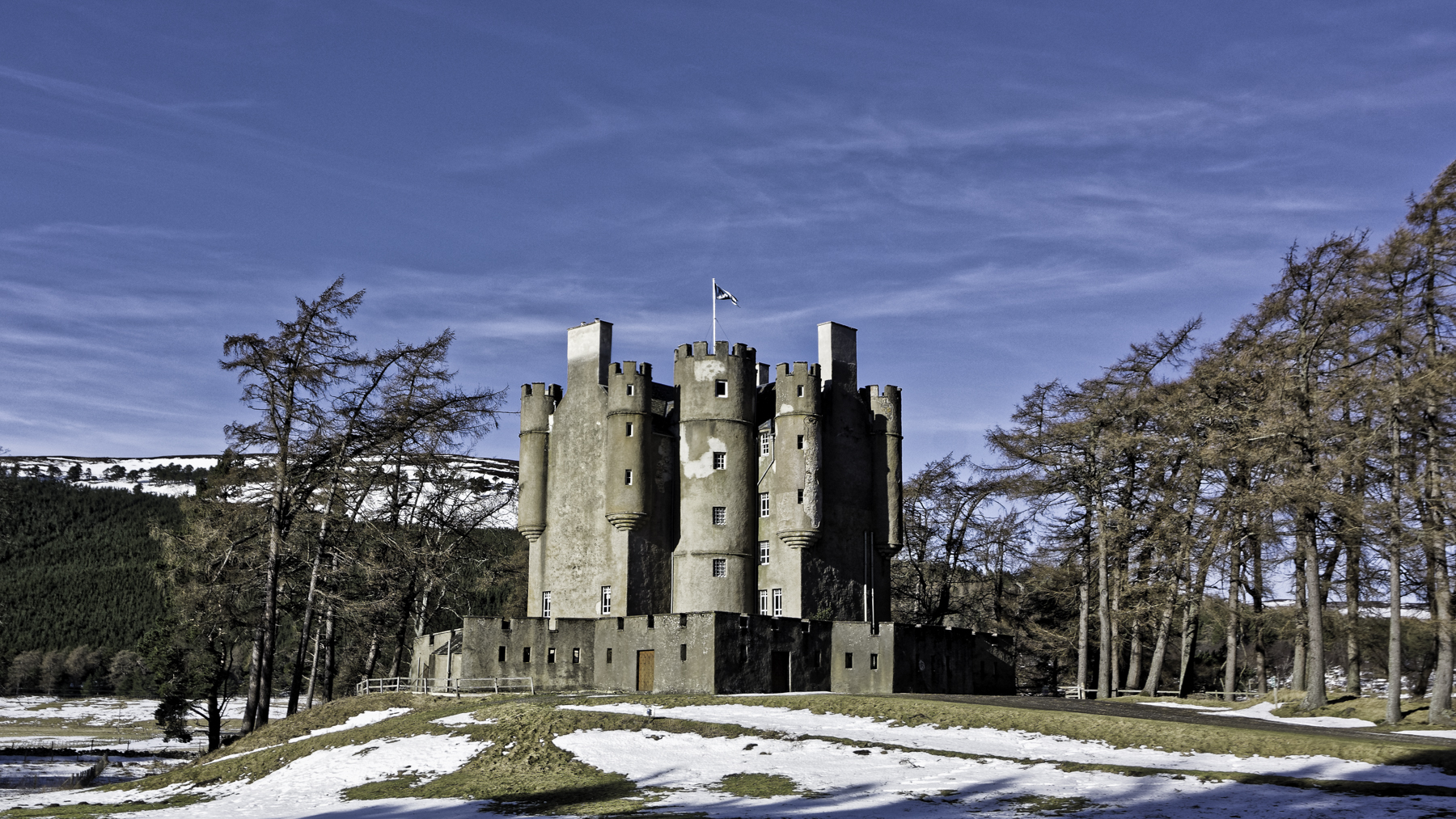
Braemar Castle is set in the stunning landscape of the Cairngorms National Park.

Gathering with numerous Highland chieftains at Aboyne, Eskin, committed to fighting for Scotland's independence. On September 6, 1715, at Braemar, he initiated the Jacobite rising of 1715 by proclaiming James VIII as the King of Scotland, England, France and Ireland. Under his leadership, the Jacobite forces gradually expanded.

The Declaration of the Earl of Mar on September 9, 1715, was a rallying call issued by John Erskine, the Earl of Mar, during the Jacobite Rising of 1715. In the declaration, Mar announced that King James III and VIII, recognised by the Jacobites as the legitimate king, had entrusted him with the command of Scottish forces. Mar, along with several Scottish nobles and military leaders, determined that the time had come to take up arms openly to restore King James to the throne and to make Scotland independent from what they viewed as oppressive foreign rule.

The declaration noted that several key figures were present at the council held at Aboyne, including Lord Huntley, Lord Tullibardine, the Earl Marischal, the Earl of Southesk, representatives from various clans, and other influential gentlemen. The statement intended to present the assembly as garnering broad support among the Scottish nobility for the Jacobite cause.

Mar called on all loyal subjects to swiftly mobilise their forces and join him at Braemar to march under the King's Standard. He emphasised the importance of discipline among the troops, forbidding plundering and disorder, and expressed confidence in the justice of their cause. Mar invoked divine support, stating that "in so honourable, good, and just a cause, we cannot doubt of the assistance, direction, and blessing of Almighty God, who has so often rescued the Royal Family of Stuart and our country from sinking under oppression". The declaration was specifically addressed to the Baillie and gentlemen of the Lordship of Kildrummie, urging them to comply with these orders as a matter of duty.

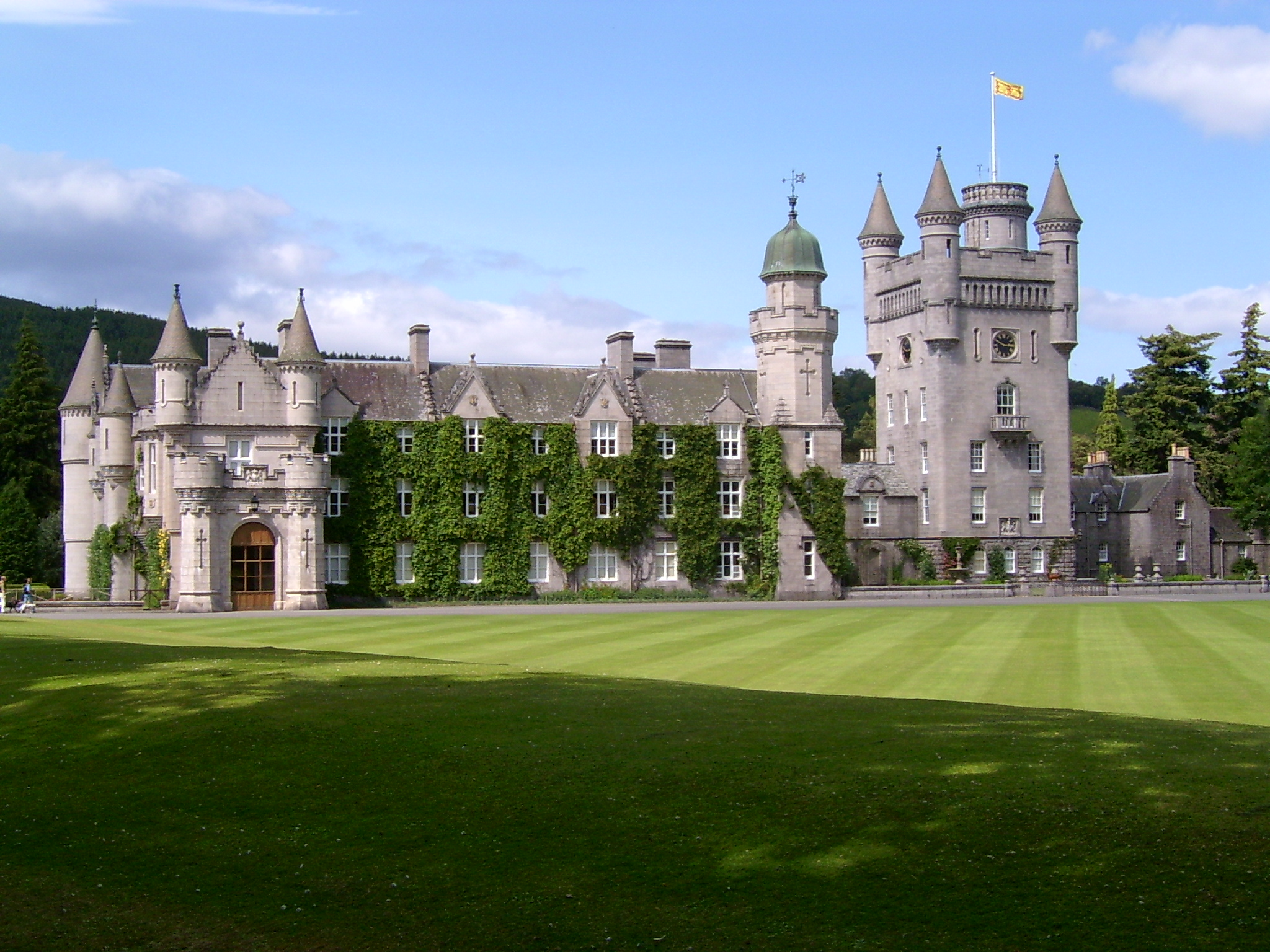
Balmoral Castle from the south lawn.

During the Jacobite rising of 1689, John Farquharson was commissioned as a colonel by John John Graham of Claverhouse. John Farquharson hailed from a family who was sympathetic to the Jacobite cause, and James Farquharson of Balmoral was involved in both the 1715 and 1745 Jacobite risings.

As a military leader, Mar faced significant challenges. Decisions such as a prolonged stay at Perth and a simulated attack on Stirling, comprised strategic moves in a broader military campaign, though they had limited success in advancing his cause. During the Battle of Sheriffmuir in November 1715, Mar commanded an army that outnumbered the forces of his opponent, the Duke of Argyll, though the battle concluded without a decisive victor.

While Mar's perceived caution is said to have caused to missed opportunities, historians note the complex circumstances and the challenging decisions he faced as a commander that clouded his ability to identify risks and opportunities. The Jacobite rising of 1715, despite not achieving its ultimate goal, was later encapsulated as a significant event in Scottish historical memory that reflected the Scottish forces' battlefield courage and their cause's noble national aspirations.

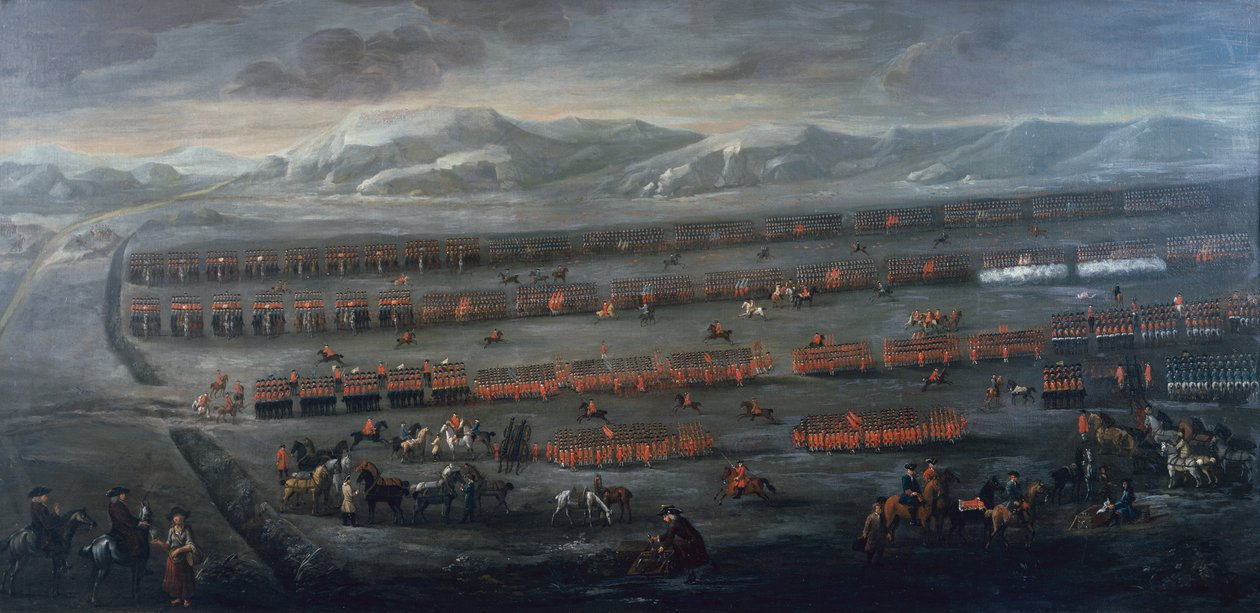
The Battle of Sheriffmuir, at which Mar commanded the Jacobite army

The Battle of Sheriffmuir was considered inconclusive but is said to have showcased strategic aspects of Mar's leadership and the bravery of his forces that helped them achieve significant tactical successes. The success of the right flank of Mar's Jacobite forces, which included Clan Donald, the Macleans, and the Breadalbane Campbells in overpowering the Hanoverian left flank was attributed to their discipline and fighting spirit under Mar's command.

The encounter was characterised by its unique dynamics, with both armies experiencing victories and defeats on different flanks. The end of the battle, marked by the onset of night, left both sides in a state of uncertainty about the outcome. Notably, Mar's forces had inflicted heavier casualties on the Hanoverians, a point often overshadowed by the battle's overall ambiguity. Exact casualty figures are uncertain, with some historians estimating that each side lost between 300 and 400 troops. The government forces, comprising 960 dragoons and 2,200 infantry, suffered as many as 1,000 casualties. On the Jacobite side, with 807 horse and 6,290 foot soldiers, around 250 casualties were recorded, though some sources claim as many as 1,500 Jacobite deaths.

== Influence of Daniel Defoe's revisions ==
In 1716, Daniel Defoe was involved in the alteration and subsequent dissemination of "A Journal of the Earl of Marr's Proceedings" a document originally intended to defend John Erskine, Earl of Mar, and his actions during the Jacobite uprising of 1715. The journal, which was initially compiled by multiple authors under Mar's direction, aimed to justify Mar's leadership and the decisions made during the rebellion.

When the journal came into Defoe's possession in England, he substantially revised the content to serve as a piece of anti-Jacobite propaganda. Defoe altered key details, such as diminishing Mar's titles and criticizing his leadership, to portray the Jacobite cause as futile and poorly managed. His version of the journal was widely circulated and effectively overshadowed the original, influencing public perception by framing the Jacobite leaders, including Mar, as ineffectual and misguided.

Defoe's revised version of the text was highly influential and saw continued circulation, going through at least eight different printings in England and Ireland. It was also reprinted in works like Robert Patten's "History of the Late Rebellion" and Nicholas Tindal's continuation of Rapin de Thoyras' "History of England" While Mar's original tract disappeared from circulation, Defoe's version resurfaced during the Jacobite rising of 1745 when it was included in reprints of Patten's "History." Defoe's intervention in the journal was seen as an effective alignment of the document with the interests of the Hanoverian government, and served to discredit the Jacobite movement and its leaders.

Daniel Defoe's involvement in revising and disseminating "A Journal of the Earl of Marr's Proceedings" has had a lasting impact on the historical scholarship surrounding John Erskine, Earl of Mar. Defoe's version of the journal, which portrayed Mar as an ineffective and indecisive leader during the Jacobite uprising of 1715, arguably become the dominant contemporary narrative and significantly impacted public perception of Mar's role. Defoe's alterations were said to be so influential that they effectively overshadowed the original narrative, recasting Mar's actions in a negative light and contributing to a long-standing negative perception of Mar's leadership.

Within this context, modern scholarship of Mar is generally viewed as highlighting Mar's leadership failures to the Jacobite cause rather than any successes. Contemporary historians continue to grapple with Defoe's influence when reassessing Mar's role in the Jacobite movement, often finding the need to navigate between Defoe's supposed propagandist depiction and contrary historical evidence to form a more balanced understanding of Mar's contributions and shortcomings.

== Exile and contemporary legacy ==
Mar joined forces James Edward at Fetteresso but was unsuccessful in attaining victory for the Jacobites. Facing challenging circumstances, Mar sought refuge in France, where Mar would remain until his death. In response to Mar's involvement in the Jacobite cause, the Parliament issued a Writ of Attainder for treason against Mar in 1716. This legal action remained in effect until it was posthumously reversed in 1824. Demonstrating continued influence within the Jacobite movement, Mar was appointed as the Jacobite Secretary of State in March 1716, succeeding Henry St John.

John Erskine, the Sixth Earl of Mar is recognized for his significant contributions to politics, architecture, and urban planning. Bestowed with the Jacobite title of Duke of Mar in 1716 by James III and VIII, he was a pivotal figure during a transformative era in British history. Created Duke of Mar, Marquess Erskine or Marquess of Stirling, Earl of Kildrummie, Viscount of Garioch, and Lord Alloa, Ferriton and Forrest in the notional Peerage of Scotland in 1715, his titles reflected his esteemed status. Despite the attainder by the government of the Hanoverian King George I in the following year, his influence and recognition persisted within Jacobite circles.

He was declared as the Earl of Mar in the Peerage of England in 1717 and Duke of Mar in the Peerage of Ireland in 1722. Although these titles became extinct after his son's death in 1766, his legacy endured through his other titles and contributions. In 1824, the Mar Peerage Restoration Act was passed by the Parliament of the United Kingdom to restore the title of Earl of Mar to the successors of John Erskine, whose public perception had been harmed following the Jacobite uprising of 1715.

Arms of the Kingdom of Jerusalem

The Earl of Mar was a forward-thinking individual, especially in the realms of architecture and urban development. His vision extended beyond the Anglo-Scottish Union of 1707, as he sought to integrate England, Ireland, and Scotland as equal partners in a proposed federation with France. This ambitious plan aimed at securing lasting peace across Europe. John Erskine served as Sovereign Grand Commander of the Order of the Fleur de Lys from 1716 to 1730, with the purpose of re-establishing the Judaic-Christian Kingdom of Jerusalem.

During his 19 years in exile following the Jacobite Rising of 1715, Mar dedicated himself to intellectual pursuits, notably in designing houses and urban improvements. These designs were not just for aesthetic value but were intended to support the infrastructural needs of a restored Stuart monarchy. His work in exile showcased his unwavering commitment to his principles and his homeland, underlining his role as a prominent and influential figure in the historical and cultural narrative of the United Kingdom.

Mar has been criticised for his perception as a political conspirator, with some labeling him a traitor to the Jacobite cause. However, recent analyses suggest that these accusations may be unjust. Mar's actions during his exile, particularly his negotiations with the British government, were primarily driven by a desire to secure his financial future and restore his family estates, rather than a betrayal of the Jacobite movement. Although he engaged in some negotiations, there is little evidence that he provided significant intelligence to the British or that he acted as a spy.

In 1717, while James Stuart was in Italy, Erskine spent several months in Paris with his wife and discussed their strained financial situation. During this time, Mar visited John Dalrymple (Lord Stair), the British Ambassador to France, and was rumored to have sought a pardon. However, Stair's account suggests that Mar only hinted at the possibility of negotiations. This meeting coincided with Parliament's consideration of an act of indemnity, which Jacobites hoped would apply to those involved in the 1715 uprising. There is speculation that Mar inquired about the Act's potential applicability to him out of a desire to secure his financial future and reclaim estates, rather than seeking political reconciliation with King George.

Mar was offered an indemnity that would have allowed him to return to Great Britain. However, he promptly informed James Stuart of his intent to refuse the offer. Mar explained that he could not, in good conscience, accept an individual indemnity unless a general indemnity was extended to all exiled Jacobites, believing that his accepting of a personal pardon without broader amnesty for others would be disloyal to their cause.

Much of the criticism against Mar came from within the Jacobite movement, especially from Bishop Francis Atterbury, a rival who accused him of treachery. However, Mar had the support of some contemporaries who defended his loyalty to the Jacobite cause. The accusations against him were likely fueled by internal power struggles and misunderstandings rather than concrete evidence of betrayal. In 1721, Mar supposedly accepted an annual pension of £3,000 from King George I. The following year, his name was mentioned in relation to the trial of Bishop Atterbury, with allegations of Mar's involvement in the bishop's alleged betrayal. Bishop Atterbury suspected that Mar had double-crossed him due to the belief that Mar was receiving an annual pension from the government. However, this suspicion may have been based on misinformation, as it has been disputed that Mar ever received such a pension, and he continued to live in unrelieved poverty. These claims remained unproven in the present.

== Mar's invasion plans ==
While in exile in France, Erskine actively sought the support of foreign powers for the House of Stuart's cause. In 1719, he was involved in orchestrating an invasion plan, leveraging Spain's ongoing war against Britain, though this initiative was ultimately hindered by adverse weather conditions.Mar played a central role in planning a Jacobite invasion in the early 1720s, specifically around 1722, aimed at restoring the Stuart monarchy. The plan was designed as a surprise attack, conducted without foreign aid, and intended to rally support from the Church of England by bringing James Butler, the 2nd Duke of Ormonde, to England. Mar coordinated with James Francis Edward Stuart, who was to set out from Rome, and Count Arthur Dillon, with whom Mar would depart from Paris simultaneously. The uprising was to begin in Scotland upon their arrival, while Ormonde and Lansdowne would invade England's West Country to divide government forces.

The success of the plan depended on careful preparation and the mobilisation of English Jacobites, while securing substantial European financing for purchasing arms and ships but without the involvement of foreign European troops. Mar also drafted a new constitution, based on a model of mixed government, where the executive's power would be limited by the legislature. This constitution, which aimed to balance royal authority with parliamentary oversight, was approved by James to be enacted in the event of a successful invasion.

Despite tight coordination and meticulous planning, the invasion did not come to fruition, owing to insufficient support and effective countermeasures by the British government. The planned invasion was also hampered by intra-Jacobite tensions, especially Francis Atterbury, who had previously abandoned Oxford and the Jacobite cause in Parliament.

== Architectural and political contributions ==
John Erskine of Mar displayed an interest in architecture and cultural preservation outside of his political engagement. His contributions in this field include work on ancestral homes and castles in Mar, including renovating the House of Alloa through the integration of traditional Scottish and baroque styles. He also made renovations to other Scottish houses, in attempts to reflect both his architectural vision and a commitment to Scotland's cultural heritage. As an extension of his interest in architecture, Erskine provided perspectives in national discussions on industrialization and landscape designing, particularly in the years leading up to the 1707 parliamentary union.

John Erskine was engaged with the architectural trends and theories of his era, reflected by an interest in the economic and social implications of domestic architecture. Erskine's work diverged from the more rigid English Palladianism promoted by Colen Campbell in Vitruvius Britannicus. While Campbell's work sought to establish a new English national style rooted in classical ideals, Erskine focused on developing a Scottish national style through innovative designs that addressed both domestic political and social concerns.

As an experienced political leader who took an interest in architecture, Erskine has sometimes been compared to Thomas Jefferson. Erskine's incorporation of the two disciplines mirrored Jefferson's later architectural pursuits around the time of the American Revolution, where he similarly fused political ideology with practical architectural solutions. Both Erskine and Jefferson drew inspiration from European sources, including the works of Jacques-François Blondel, integrating these influences into their designs to create environments that reflected an idealised social order. Their architectural legacies thus represent a unique blend of style, political expression and practical domestic economy, distinguishing their work within the broader context of 18th-century architecture.

Erskine's influence extended to urban planning, with contributions to city blueprints for Edinburgh, London, and Paris. During his Jacobite exile in France, he was involved in local court affairs, marked by interactions with prominent figures and experiences across Europe and valued for political and international insight. His projects in architecture and urban design included plans for palaces and houses across Europe. Mar spent his later years in Paris and Aix-la-Chapelle, where he died in 1732.

== Personal life and family ==
John Erskine, Earl of Mar, first married Lady Margaret Hay, daughter of Thomas Hay, 7th Earl of Kinnoull, on 6 April 1703. They had a son, Thomas, born in 1705. Lady Margaret died on 26 April 1707.

Mar's second marriage was to Lady Frances Pierrepont, daughter of Evelyn Pierrepont, 1st Duke of Kingston-upon-Hull. They married on 20 July 1714 at St Mary's Church, Acton. This alliance assisted Mar in addressing the financial challenges inherited from his family. Lady Frances experienced significant health challenges, suffering from mental illness beginning in 1728, a condition thought to be exacerbated by the difficulties surrounding Mar's exile in France. Despite these challenges, Lady Frances lived on for several more decades, dying on 4 March 1767. She was laid to rest at St Marylebone Parish Church in Westminster.

== Notable relatives ==
- Through his marriage to Lady Frances Pierrepont, Mar was a brother-in-law of Lady Mary Wortley Montagu.
- Mar's brother, James Erskine, Lord Grange, was a noted judge.
- Mar's son Thomas Erskine, Lord Erskine served as Grand Master of the Grand Lodge of Scotland (1749–1750).
- Robert Erskine (physician) (Areskine) was the librarian of Peter the Great.

== In popular culture ==
- In Robert Burns' song "The Battle of Sheriffmuir", John Erskine's role as a commander during the 1715 Jacobite uprising is highlighted through a vivid portrayal of the battle's chaos and bloodshed. The song recounts the different perspectives of two shepherds who discuss the intense confrontation between the Highland clans, led by the Jacobites, and the government forces, with Erskine's leadership playing a central role in the conflict. Burns' depiction emphasizes the mixed outcomes and the tragic losses on both sides, capturing the tumultuous nature of the battle in which Erskine was a key figure.
- Elizabeth Peters' 1976 romantic suspense novel, Legend in Green Velvet, prominently features a fictional member of Clan Erskine, along with the castle and the history of the Clan. The story follows Susan, a young American archaeology student in Edinburgh with a deep love for all things Scottish. When the opportunity arises to join an archaeological dig in the Highlands, it feels like a dream come true. However, Susan soon finds herself fleeing from mysterious pursuers and teams up with a young Scottish laird, a member of Clan Erskine, who is also under threat from the same unidentified figures.
- The progressive rock band Genesis wrote a song, "Eleventh Earl of Mar" (found on their Wind & Wuthering album), about Mar and the 1715 Jacobite rising. The lyrics were written by Mike Rutherford, who explains "I had this idea after reading this history book about a failed Scottish rising. I liked the idea of him – he was a bit gay, a bit camp, and a bit well-dressed."
- He was mentioned in a contemporary folk song "Cam Ye O'er Frae France", which was recorded by British folk rock band Steeleye Span.
- He was mentioned in the Starz original series, Outlander – season two, episode two, at the 21:50 mark.
- The Alloa branch of the Wetherspoons pub chain is named "The Bobbing John" after Mar.

== Castles and estates ==
- Alloa Tower in Clackmannanshire, was built two centuries after the founding of Kildrummy, in the fourteenth century, as the Erskine's Lowland stronghold.
- Braemar Castle in Aberdeenshire, was a center for hunting parties and Highland gatherings.
- Kildrummy Castle in Aberdeenshire, was probably built in the mid-13th century and was the seat of the Earls of Mar.
- Stirling Castle is located in Stirling, where John Erskine, 23rd and 6th Earl of Mar was Hereditary Governor and Captain of Stirling Castle.
- Mar Lodge Estate in Aberdeenshire, is the largest remnant of the historic Earldom of Mar.

== Tartans ==
Tartan Image	Notes
	Areskyn tartan, as published in Vestiarium Scoticum (1842).
	Mar tartan

== See also ==
- Clan Mar
- Clan Erskine
- Earldom of Mar

== Bibliography of works on John Erskine, Earl of Mar (1675–1732) ==
- Stewart, Margaret (2016). "The Architectural, Landscape and Constitutional Plans of the Earl of Mar, 1700-32". Four Courts Press. ISBN 978-1846825750
- Way, George and Squire, Romily. (1994). Collins Scottish Clan & Family Encyclopedia. (Foreword by The Rt Hon. The Earl of Elgin KT, Convenor, The Standing Council of Scottish Chiefs). HarperCollins. ISBN 978-0004705477
- Moore, John Robert. "Defoe's Hand in "A Journal of the Earl of Marr's Proceedings (1716)", Huntington Library Quarterly, May, 1954, Vol. 17, No. 3 (May, 1954), pp. 209–228 (University of Pennsylvania Press, JSTOR 3816426)
- Bruce, Maurice. "The Duke of Mar in Exile, 1716-32". Transactions of the Royal Historical Society, Vol. 20 (1937), pp. 61–82 (Cambridge University Press, JSTOR 3678593)
- "Archival material relating to John Erskine, Earl of Mar". UK National Archives.

Political offices
Preceded by The Viscount Bolingbroke	Jacobite Secretary of State; 1716–1724	Succeeded by John Hay
Peerage of Scotland
New creation	— TITULAR — Duke of Mar; Jacobite peerage 1715–1732	Succeeded by Thomas Erskine
Preceded by Charles Erskine	Earl of Mar; 1689–1716 (Attainted)	Succeeded by John Erskine (Restored in 1824)
