= Bobs Creek (Meramec River tributary) =

Stream in the American state of Missouri

Coordinates: 38.0686576°N 91.1737518°W

Bobs Creek is a stream in Crawford County in the U.S. state of Missouri. It is a tributary of the Meramec River.

Bobs Creek has the first name of a businessperson in the local coal industry.

== See also ==
- List of rivers of Missouri
