= Bobs Lake (Sudbury District) =

Lake in Sudbury District, Ontario, Canada

- Location of Bobs Lake in Ontario.
- Location: Ontario, Canada
- Coordinates: 47°55′06″N 83°03′33″W
- Type: Lake
- Part of: James Bay drainage basin
- Max. length: 1.23 km (0.76 mi)
- Max. width: .67 km (0.42 mi)
- Surface elevation: 413 m (1,355 ft)

Bobs Lake is a lake in geographic Gamey Township in the Unorganized North Part of Sudbury District in Northeastern Ontario, Canada. It is in the James Bay drainage basin and is part of the Moose River system. The lake is 2 kilometres (1.2 mi) south of Ontario Highway 101.

== Hydrology ==
The primary inflow, at the northeast, and outflow, at the northwest, is Roswell Creek. Roswell Creek flows to the Nemegosenda River, then via the Kapuskasing River, the Mattagami River and the Moose River to James Bay.
