= Bob =

Bob, BOB, or B.O.B. may refer to:

== Currency ==
- Bolivian boliviano (ISO 4217 currency code)
- Shilling, a pre-decimal British coin

== People and named animals ==
- Bob (given name), a list of people and fictional characters
- Bob (surname)
- Bob (dog), who received the Dickin Medal for bravery in World War II
- Bob the Railway Dog, a part of South Australian Railways folklore
- Bob & Bob, performance art duo

== Places ==
- Mount Bob, New York, US
- Bob Island, Palmer Archipelago, Antarctica
- Bank One Ballpark, now Chase Field
- Berlin Operating Base, the CIA station in Berlin during the Cold War
- Bora Bora Airport (IATA code)

== Television, games, and radio ==
- Bob (TV series), an American comedy series starring Bob Newhart
- B.O.B. (video game), a side-scrolling shooter

== Music ==
=== Musicians and groups ===
- B.o.B (born 1988), American rapper and record producer
- Bob (band), a British indie pop band
- The Bobs, an American a cappella group
- Boyz on Block, a British pop supergroup

=== Songs ===
- "B.O.B" (song), by OutKast
- "Bob" ("Weird Al" Yankovic song), from the 2003 album Poodle Hat by "Weird Al" Yankovic
- "Bob", a song from the album Brighter Than Creation's Dark by the Drive-By Truckers
- "Bob", a song from the album White Trash, Two Heebs and a Bean by NOFX
- "Bob", a song from the album Pork Soda by Primus
- "Bob", a song from the album One Hot Minute by the Red Hot Chili Peppers
- "The Bob (Medley)", a song from Roxy Music's self-titled album

== Organizations ==
- Baby on board, a type of vehicle caution sign
- Bank of Baroda, in India
- Bank of Botswana
- 1st Bangor Old Boys F.C., Northern Irish football club
- Bayerische Oberlandbahn, a private German railway company
- Beijing Olympic Broadcasting
- Berner Oberland Bahn, a mountain railway in Switzerland
- Boys of Bangladesh, a network of gay men in Bangladesh

== Science and technology ==
- Bob (physics), the mass at the end of a pendulum
- Alice and Bob, placeholder characters in cryptography and physics problems
- Blitter object, a graphics construct
- Breakout board, a minimal printed circuit board with a single component
- Microsoft Bob, a software product

== Sport ==
- Bobsleigh or bobsled, sometimes called bob
  - Bobsleigh at the Winter Olympics (IOC sport code BOB)

== Other uses ==
- Aweer language (ISO 639-3 code)
- BOB (psychedelic), a drug
- Bob cut, a hairstyle
- Hurricane Bob (disambiguation)
- Bend Over Boyfriend, a sexual practice
- Best of Biotech, a business plan competition organized by Austria Wirtschaftsservice
- Bug-out bag, an evacuation kit
- Buy on board, food or beverages purchased in-flight
- Rhinoplasty, particularly reshaping of the nasal tip, colloquially and historically called a "bob" or "bobbed nose" in the US

== See also ==
- Bob's (disambiguation)
- Bobb (disambiguation)
- Bobbing (disambiguation)
