= Bob's Creek (Ontario) =

- Location of the mouth of Bob's Creek in Ontario

Location
- Country: Canada
- Province: Ontario
- Region: Northeastern Ontario
- District: Cochrane
- Municipality: Timmins

Physical characteristics
- Source: Bob's Lake (Timmins)
  - coordinates: 48°29′26″N 81°09′16″W
  - elevation: 281 m (922 ft)
- Mouth: Porcupine Lake
  - coordinates: 48°29′00″N 81°10′39″W
  - elevation: 277 m (909 ft)
- Length: 2.2 km (1.4 mi)

Basin features
- River system: James Bay drainage basin

Bob's Creek is a river in the James Bay and Abitibi River drainage basins in the community of Porcupine, City of Timmins, Cochrane District in northeastern Ontario, Canada. It flows 2.2 kilometres (1.4 mi) from Bobs Lake to its mouth at Porcupine Lake, the source of the Porcupine River.

== Course ==
Bob's Creek begins at the southwest of Bobs Lake at an elevation of 281 metres (922 ft) and flows southwest. passing under Gervais Street South. It then turns north, heads under a railway line and Haileybury Crescent, and reaches its mouth at Porcupine Lake at an elevation of 277 metres (909 ft). The lake flows via the Porcupine River and Frederick House River to the Abitibi River.

== See also ==
- List of rivers of Ontario
