= Bobb =

Other names
- Related names: Bobbs

Bobb, or Bobbs, is a name. It can refer to:

== People with the surname Bobb ==
- Alston Bobb (born 1984), Vincentian cricketer
- Columpa Bobb (born 1971), Indigenous Canadian photographer, actress, playwright, and poet
- Euric Bobb (born 1943), economist and former 400 m runner from Trinidad and Tobago
- Jeremy Bobb (born 1981), American actor
- Louisa Bobb (born 1969), stage name Gabrielle (singer), British singer and songwriter
- Nelson Bobb (1924–2003), American basketball player
- Oscar Bobb (born 2003), Norwegian footballer
- Randy Bobb (1948–1982), American Major League Baseball player
- Robert Bobb (born 1945), American local government official
- Shackell Bobb, Vincentian lawyer
- Trayon Bobb (born 1993), Guyanese footballer
- Yusupha Bobb (born 1996), Gambian professional footballer

== People with the given name Bobb ==
- Bobb Goldsteinn (born 1936), American showman, songwriter and artist
- Bobb McKittrick (1935–2000), American football coach
- Bobb Trimble (born 1958), American psychedelic folk/outsider musician
- Bobb, an animated ape character in the TV show Cro

== People with the name Bobbs ==
- John Stough Bobbs (1809–1870), American surgeon and educator
- Quanita Bobbs (born 1993), South African field hockey player
- Ruth Pratt Bobbs (1884–1973), American painter
- William Conrad Bobbs (1861–1926), American publisher, of Bobbs-Merrill Company
