= Marie Stewart, Countess of Mar =

Scottish courtier (1576–1644)

The Right Honourable Marie Stewart
- Countess of Mar
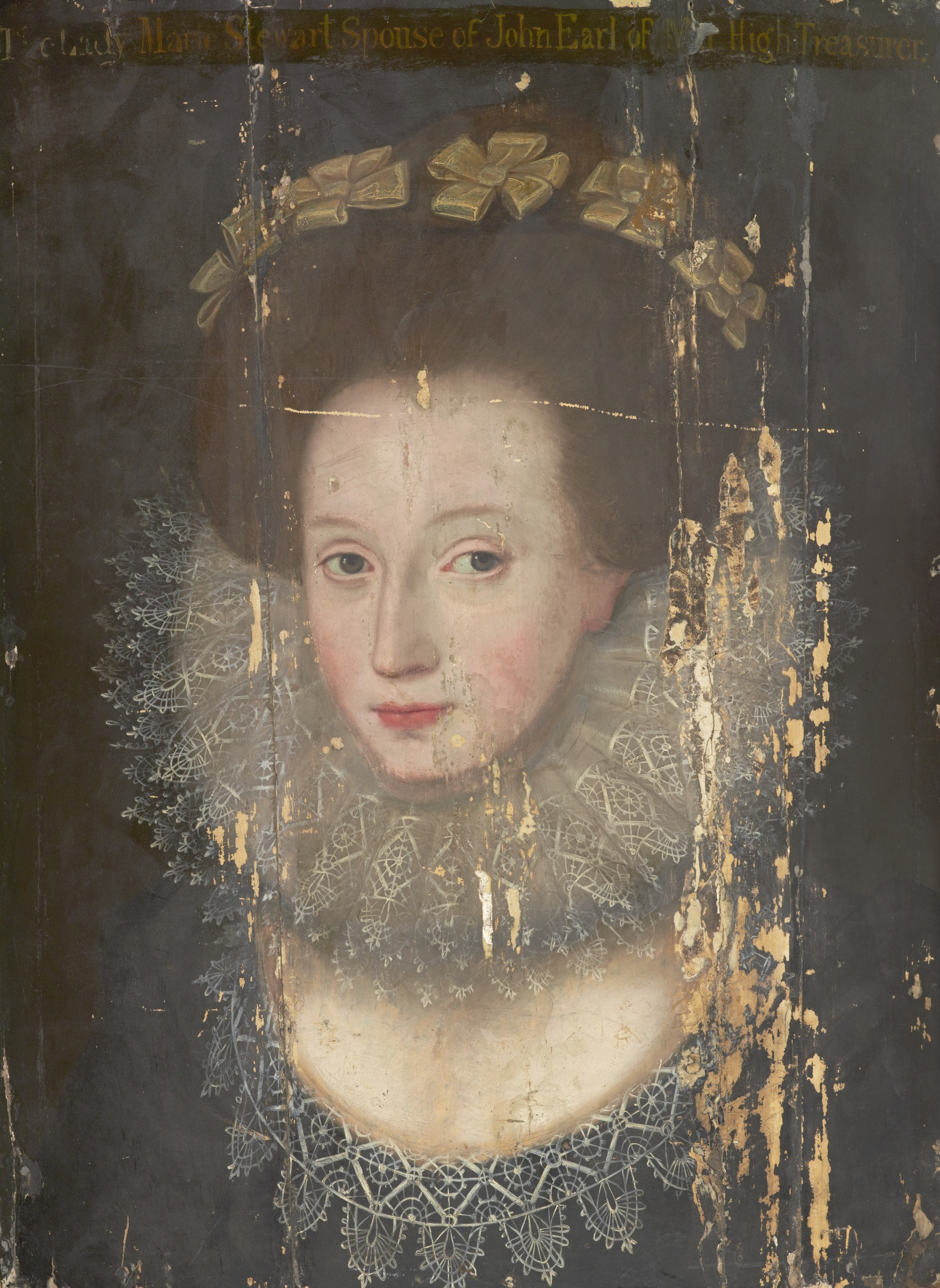
- The Countess depicted in an oil painting. (c. 1620)
- Born: 7 April 1576; Aubigny-sur-Nère, Berry, France
- Died: 11 May 1644 (aged 68); Cowgate, Edinburgh, Kingdom of Scotland
- Spouse: John Erskine, 2nd Earl of Mar (m. 1592; died 1634)
- Issue: at least 12
- Parents: Esmé Stewart, 1st Duke of Lennox; Catherine de Balsac d'Entragues

Marie Stewart (7 April 1576 – 11 May 1644) was a Scottish courtier and Countess of Mar by marriage. She was the daughter of Esmé Stewart, 1st Duke of Lennox and Catherine de Balsac d’Entragues (d. c.1631) and a favourite of James VI of Scotland. After her marriage to John Erskine, 2nd Earl of Mar, as was customary in Scotland, she did not change her name, and signed her letters as "Marie Stewart".

== Marriage and conversion ==
In February 1584 James VI proposed that Marie Stewart might marry Lord Home or John Home of Coldenknowes. She was said to be "little above seven years old".

Marie and her older sister Henrietta came to Scotland in 1588, arriving at Leith while James VI was at the siege of Lochmaben Castle. Their older brother Ludovic had been summoned to Scotland in November 1583. In June 1588, James VI requested that Edinburgh town council host the two sisters for 15 or 20 days. Henrietta married George Gordon, 1st Marquess of Huntly on 21 July.

Her second sister, Gabrielle was a nun in France at Glatigny, and a scheme for her to marry Hugh Montgomerie, 5th Earl of Eglinton in 1598 came to nothing.

Marie became a lady-in-waiting in the household of Anne of Denmark, queen consort of James VI, in December 1590 at Henrietta's request. The Masters of the Queen's Household wrote a memorandum about expenses of meals, and mentioned that Marie Stewart ought to have a breakfast because she was a "tender bairn". On 13 June 1592 Anna of Denmark ordered matching orange gowns with green sleeves for herself, Marie Stewart, and the Danish maiden of honour Margaret Vinstarr, a demonstration of favour and loyalty.

It was thought that Marie might marry the Earl of Argyll instead of a suggested bride, Agnes Douglas, a daughter of the Earl of Morton by the persuasion of "very great personages". This match had been discussed in March 1589 by an English man at the Scottish court, Thomas Fowler, who noted that Marie Stewart and her sister were Catholics.

In December 1592 Marie married the widower John Erskine, Earl of Mar. The banns were published at Stirling on 17 September 1592. The wedding was first planned to be at Dalkeith Palace, on 1 October, but the Earl was ill. He was older at thirty five, she was regarded as "ane tender bairn". A story descended in the family of the Earls of Haddington and was recorded by Sir Walter Scott that at first Marie scorned the older man, and James VI hearing of this, encouraged his old friend, swearing an oath, "ye shanna die, Jock for onny lass in a' the land", meaning in modernised terms "you shall not die, Jock, for any lass in all the land".

The wedding celebrations were held at Holyrood Palace and Alloa Tower in December 1592. James and Anne of Denmark gave her clothes, including a "pair of baleen bodies" (a bodice stiffened with whalebone). The wedding gown shone with glittering cloth of gold and cloth of silver. There was a masque in costume in which Anne of Denmark performed. The festivities at Alloa were cut short when Sir John Carmichael and Sir George Home arrived from Edinburgh with news of the crisis caused by the discovery of the Spanish blanks.

Marie was a Catholic, and the earl was urged by the Kirk of Scotland to make her embrace the Protestant religion. In 1609 a marriage was planned between their son John Erskine and Jean Hay, daughter of the Earl of Errol who was thought to be Catholic. The king asked the Earl of Mar for Jean to make her profession of faith before the church, before the marriage. After the marriage she should be instructed and taught "according to that president whiche you haif alreddy kyithed in your owne wyife" - that Jean Hay should be taught the Protestant religion as Marie had been.

Marie was instructed by the minister of Stirling, Patrick Simson (1556-1618). Simson preached to her sister and brother-in-law, the Marquess of Huntly, when they were warded in Stirling Castle in March 1609. Marie was considered an excellent convert. James Caldwell minister of Falkirk dedicated his The Countesse of Marres Arcadia, or Sanctuarie Containing morning, and evening meditations, for the whole weeke (John Wreittoun: Edinburgh, 1625), to her, including a dedicatory letter by P. Anderson mentioning that "The Countesse of Pembroke's Arcadia is for the bodie; but the Countesse of Marre her Arcadia is for the Soule", and "amongst the many Noble Ladies of this Kingdome, your Honour to bee a true Paterne of modest Pietie, a perfect mirror of feminine gravitie, & a liberall supplier of the necessities of the poore, yea, in time of dearth, and scarsetie: And as his Majestie long since, in his Booke of Poesies, called your Noble Father the Phoenix of al the Nobility; so may the world esteeme your Honour to be another elect Lydia of that same Noble qualitie". The reference is to Lydia of Thyatira, an early convert to Christianity.

== Faction in Scotland ==
Marie Stewart was at court in May 1593, with her sister Henrietta, Countess of Huntly, and on 31 May with Anne of Denmark and the ladies of the royal household went to Leith to inspect the ship of the Danish ambassadors Niels Krag and Steen Bille at Leith, and rewarded the sailors with gold coins.

In October 1593 she was visited at Brechin Castle by her brother-in-law, the Earl of Huntly. Her brother, the Duke of Lennox was also at Brechin, and Marie was given a charter, a sasine, of fishing rights on the West Esk.

In a letter to Mar in September 1594, James VI called Marie Stewart his "aunt". James gave Marie a ring set with 11 diamonds, worth £300 Scots in May 1595. This gift was probably after the birth of her son, who was baptised at Stirling on 20 July 1595 with the king as a godparent. Marie Stewart and her sister Henrietta were Dames of Honour at the christening of Prince Charles on 23 December 1600 at Holyrood Palace.

Marie was involved in factional politics, supporting her husband and also the cause of her sister and the Earl of Huntly. In October 1595 the Earl of Mar's faction hoped that Anne of Denmark would influence the selection of the Chancellor of Scotland in their favour. Marie visited the queen at Linlithgow Palace but was kept waiting outside her chamber door for an hour. Marie argued with her brother, the Duke of Lennox, in May 1602 about accusations her husband may have made and implicated Sir Thomas Erskine. James Sempill of Beltrees reported her conversation to Robert Cecil. The Earl of Northampton reported this back to Mar.

In December 1602, her sister the Countess of Huntly came to Stirling Castle to see her and Prince Henry, and both sisters travelled to Holyrood Palace on Christmas Eve. In May 1603 Anne of Denmark came to Stirling hoping to collect her son Prince Henry, who was officially in the keeping of the Earl of Mar and his late mother Annabell Murray, who had recently died. The Earl of Mar himself was temporarily absent accompanying James VI to London to assume the English throne following the death of Elizabeth I. Anne sent a message to Marie that she would have her son delivered to her to travel with her to England. Anne arrived at Stirling Castle, and sat down to dinner with Marie and her stepson, the Master of Mar. She fainted into the arms of Marie and Agnes Douglas, Countess of Argyll, and when Jean Drummond and Marion Boyd, Mistress of Paisley, carried her to bed she had a miscarriage. The lawyer Thomas Hamilton gave an eyewitness account of these events, and said the queen had told her physician Martin Schöner and Lady Paisley that she had taken "some balm water that hastened her abort". Some biographers of Anne of Denmark assert that the "Lady Mar" of this incident was the dowager countess, Annabell Murray.

Anne of Denmark left Stirling Castle with Henry on 28 May, accompanied by English ladies, according to Robert Birrell, the author of a memoir. This suggests that Lucy Russell, Countess of Bedford, and Frances Howard, Countess of Kildare, who are known to have travelled to Scotland to seek the queen's favour and employment in her court, were at Stirling at this time.

In February 1604 it was reported that the King of France, Henry IV had awarded a pension to her mother. Marie Stewart remained a friend of another lady in waiting Elizabeth Schaw, and her husband John Murray, later Earl of Annandale, who were courtiers in London. Schaw took long leave from the queen's household in August 1613 and came to Scotland and stayed with Marie at Alloa and Stirling . On 16 June 1622 Marie wrote to John Murray with news of the death of the Chancellor, Alexander Seton, 1st Earl of Dunfermline, hoping that he could persuade the king to make the Earl of Mar keeper of Dunfermline Palace. In 1603 Seton had written to James excusing her, the earl's, and her stepson's conduct at Stirling in May 1603.

The Earl of Mar bought a jewel from William Herrick, a London goldsmith, which he left to his wife in a will made in 1608. He wrote that Marie Stewart would be his executor and tutor to his children in the event of his death.

Building accounts show that Marie, and her stepson John, Lord Erskine, had apartments in Edinburgh Castle in 1623 and 1624. Repairs to Edinburgh Castle and Holyrood Palace made by a carpenter Arthur Hamilton include work in "Lady Erskyne's studie" and "Lady Marre's gallery", and a chamber for their gentlewomen. A blacksmith Thomas Brown made new fittings for Lord Erskine's hall door in the castle.

Elizabeth of Bohemia suggested that one of Marie's sons, Alexander or Henry, should marry one of her ladies in waiting, Mistress Margaret or Margery Croft (d. 1637), a daughter of the Catholic Sir Herbert Croft of Croft Castle and Mary Bourne heiress of Sir Anthony Bourne of Holt Castle. The marriage, which did not take place, and Margaret's identity and correspondence with Constantijn Huygens were examined by Lisa Jardine.

In September 1629 George Hay, Viscount Dupplin discovered that "My Lady Marre" had obtained a chest containing documents concerning taxation in Scotland which had been kept by the late Archibald Primrose, clerk of taxations. She made some difficulties about handing over the documents, and was away from Edinburgh in the north of Scotland.

After her husband's death in 1634 she quarreled with her stepson, the new Earl of Mar, over various issues. She sent a "memorial" of the issues to the lawyer Thomas Hope who advised they settle their differences amicably to the benefit of their noble house. One issue was inherited jewellery. In August 1639, they quarrelled over their seat in the Church of the Holy Rude at Stirling. She was a supporter of the Solemn League and Covenant, and three of her sons, Alexander, Arthur and John, joined Alexander Leslie at Duns Law in the First Bishop's war in 1639.

Marie died at the house of Sir Thomas Hope in the Cowgate, Edinburgh, on 11 May 1644, after suffering for two weeks from an illness described as a "deadlie brasch". She was buried at Alloa on 23 May 1644.

== Legacy and letters ==
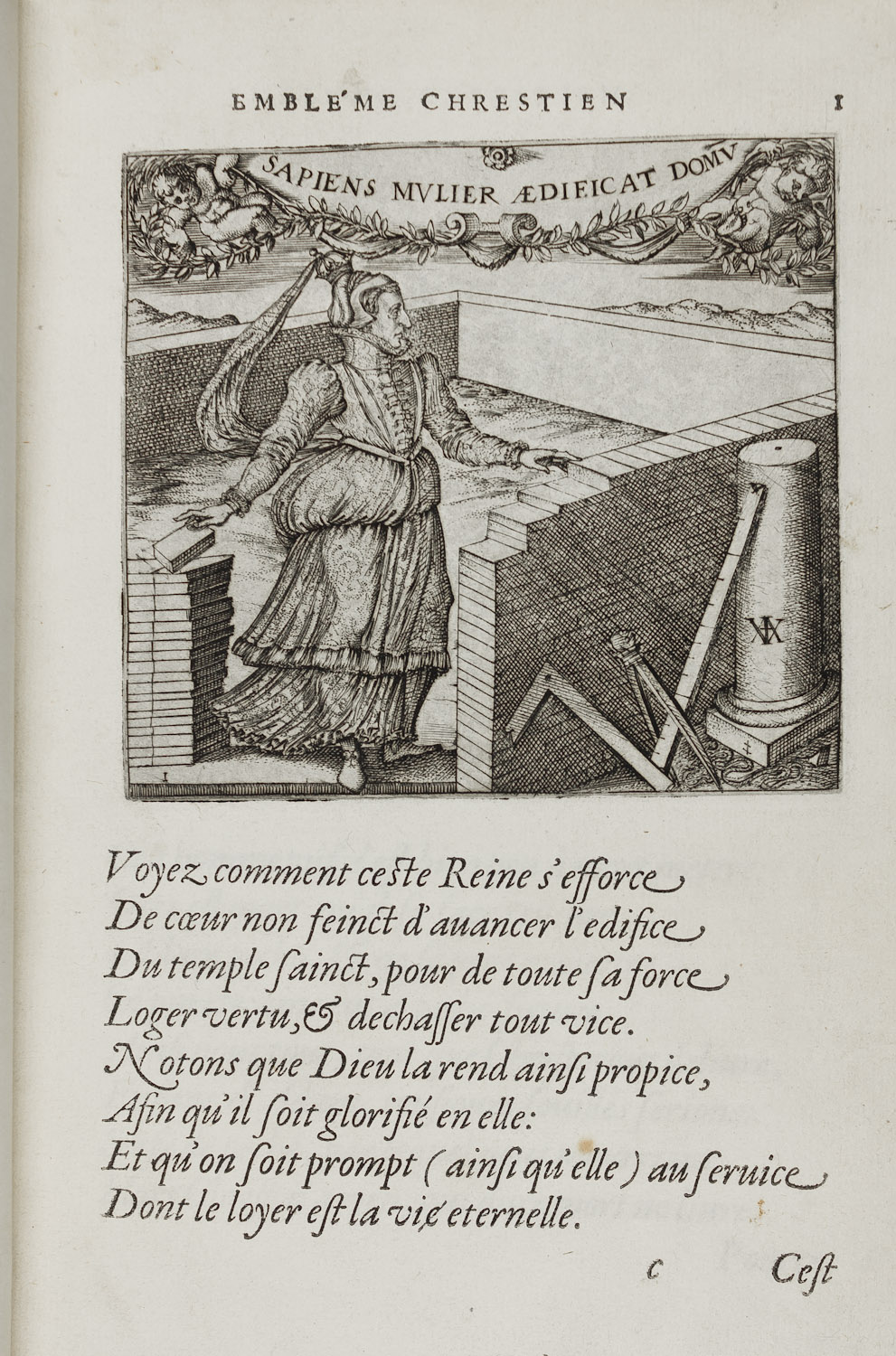
Esther Inglis revised an image by Georgette de Montenay to honour the Countess

A number of letters written by Marie Stewart survive in the National Library of Scotland, she wrote to her son Charles in November 1639, "Now within thri or four days I look for yow, the does of the park ar longing for yow, and so am I". Her correspondents included the Minister Alexander Henderson and the poet David Murray of Gorthy. Alexander Hume, minister of Logie, linked Marie with the poet "elder Lady Elizabeth Melville, Lady Comrie", in his will in December 1609, wishing them both "love, Christian affection, and blessing".

Marie Stewart used the symbol of a closed "S", the "s fermé" or "fermesse" in her letters. It was a symbol of affection and fidelity. The symbol was depicted in jewellery and the word fermesse was used in French jewellery inventories. The fermesse appears in designs for miniature cases by Étienne Delaune. Her contemporary, Anne Livingstone, Countess of Eglinton, used the fermesse in her 1616 letter to John Murray of the bedchamber and Elizabeth Schaw.

In a dedication to her brother, the Duke of Lennox, Andrew Simson wrote that she had commanded and directed his uncle Patrick Simson's work on The Historie of the Church since the Dayes of our Saviour Iesus Christ, untill this present age (London, 1624). The book includes a dedicatory letter to Marie Stewart, compiled from dedications by Patrick Simson, minister of Stirling, to three earlier works, the Short Compend of the historie of the first ten persecutions, which was published in three parts in Edinburgh, in 1613, 1615 and 1616. The title pages of the Short Compend also refer to Marie Stewart by quoting Luke 10:42, "Marie hath chosen the good part, which shall not be taken away from her" from the story of Mary and Martha.

Referring again to her conversion, Patrick's brother, the minister Archibald Simson dedicated his "True Record of Life and Death of Master Patrick Simsone" to Marie and her daughter-in-law, writing in March 1619 that Patrick Simson had been the "happy instrument of God to begett your Ladyships as a spiritual father in Jesus Christ".

She was a patron of the calligrapher and illustrator Esther Inglis. A drawing by Inglis dated January 1622 illustrates the "wise woman who builds her house" from Proverbs 14:1, with a Latin dedication to the Earl and to the "remarkable piety" of Maria Stewart, Countess of Mar. The image of a woman building a wall used by Esther Inglis follows an engraving designed by Georgette de Montenay which identified the wise woman as Jeanne d'Albret mother of the Protestant Henri of Navarre.

She is also known for her household account book made by her steward George Monorgun, published as Extracts from the Household Book of Lady Marie Stewart, Daughter of Esme, Duke of Lenox, and Countess of Mar (Edinburgh, 1812). The account records Highland singers, pipers, drummers, and harpers. It also includes charitable gifts to the poor, and poor musicians, including Keller, a blind singer from Dunbar. A pair of virginals thought to have belonged to Marie are now in the National Museum of Scotland.

Her descendant, the nineteenth-century antiquarian Charles Kirkpatrick Sharpe, examined some of her papers at Alva and believed that David Erskine, Earl of Buchan had taken some away. Sharpe was not impressed by Marie Stewart's support for the Covenant. Buchan wrote a biographical note of Marie, with some quotations from her letters, and an account of her reluctance to marry the older earl before the king's intervention, and published an estimate of her expenses in 1636.

Marie's homes in Scotland included Stirling Castle, Mar's Wark, Alloa Tower, Cardross House, Braemar Castle and Brechin Castle where she entertained John Taylor the Water Poet and King James on his return to Scotland in 1617. In 1598 her gardener in Stirling, Thomas Cameron, was warned by the Kirk Session not to allow his serving woman to lodge in his house, for fear of slander.

She had inventories of the contents and furnishings of Brechin Castle made in 1611 and 1622 which she checked and signed, noting some new furnishings, "since this inventar was mead thir is sindrie beds and burds mead new as the compts beares, with sum uther nesesaires to the hous". She also had lodgings within Holyrood Palace, mentioned in the Brechin inventory, and she wrote from Holyrood to Sir Robert Kerr of Ancram on 21 January 1624.

== Family ==
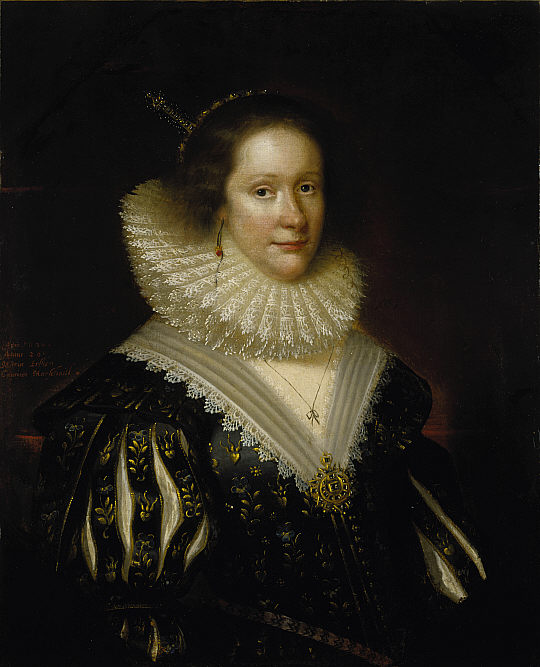
Mary Erskine, Countess Marischal, by George Jamesone

She had at least twelve children:

- James Erskine (c.1594–died 1640), Earl of Buchan, knighted in 1603 and later a gentleman of the bedchamber to Charles I.
- Anna Erskine (1597–1640), married John Leslie, 6th Earl of Rothes, subject of a portrait by George Jamesone, Scottish National Portrait Gallery PG2456. In November 1614 Viscount Fenton discussed the marriage of Mar's daughter Anna Erskine to a son of the Earl of Rothes. Although Rothes was an ancient and noble house, Fenton would not have advised that Mar's eldest sons should marry a daughter of the "last Lady Rothes that was". They were married 1616, at a double wedding with her brother James and his bride, Mary, Countess of Buchan. At the time, Marie, Countess of Mar, was pregnant.
- Mary Erskine (1596–1664), who married in 1609 William Keith, 6th Earl Marischal, subject of a portrait by George Jamesone, Scottish National Portrait Gallery NG958. She subsequently married Patrick Maule, 1st Earl of Panmure.
- Margaret Erskine (1599–1640), married John Lyon, 2nd Earl of Kinghorne, son of Anne Murray.
- Annabella Erskine (1601), died young.
- Catherine Erskine (1603–1635), who married Thomas Hamilton, 2nd Earl of Haddington. She died in 1635 and her mother's servants made efforts to recover her jewelry, including a feather set with 49 diamonds, from her creditors in London. Her husband was killed by the explosion at Dunglass Castle in 1640.
- Alexander Erskine (1604– 1640), in 1626 his father wrote to Elizabeth Stuart, Queen of Bohemia declining a plan for his marriage. He was killed by the explosion at Dunglass Castle on 30 August 1640, He was probably the subject of a portrait by George Jamesone.
- Arthur Erskine of Scotscraig, (1605–1651), who married in 1628 Margaret Buchanan daughter of Margaret Hartsyde and John Buchanan of Scotscraig. He was killed at the Battle of Worcester.
- Henry Erskine (1605–1628), who may have danced in Lord Haddington's masque in 1608. He married Margaret Bannatyne or Bellenden in 1626. Their son David Erskine succeeded to the barony of Cardross, and in 1646 married Anne Hope, daughter of Sir Thomas Hope.
- Charles Erskine of Bandeath and Alva (1611–1663), the ancestor of the earls of Rosslyn, married Mary Hope in 1639, daughter of Sir Thomas Hope.
- John Erskine (1614–1640), killed by the explosion at Dunglass Castle.
- William Erskine (1615–1685), Cupbearer to King Charles II and Master of Charterhouse Hospital.

One of her sons was baptised at Stirling on 20 July 1595 with James VI as a godparent. A gift of a ring set with 11 diamonds from King James on 30 May 1595 was perhaps made in connection with the child's birth.

The weddings of Anna Erskine and James Erskine were held in the same week in 1616. Henry Erskine and Alexander Erskine went to France with a tutor in December 1616. They went to Bourges to meet their grandmother, Catherine de Balsac widow of Esmé Stewart. They saw their aunt Gabrielle Stewart at the convent at Glatigny.
