= John Erskine, Earl of Mar (1585–1654) =

Scottish landowner

John Erskine
- 3rd Earl of Mar
- Born: 1585
- Died: 1654 (aged 68–69)
- Spouse: Christian Hay
- Issue: John Erskine, 4th Earl of Mar
- Father: John Erskine, 2nd Earl of Mar
- Mother: Anne Drummond

John Erskine, 3rd Earl of Mar (1585 – 1654) was a Scottish landowner.

== Career ==
He was the son of John Erskine, Earl of Mar (1558–1634) and Anne Drummond (1555-1587), daughter of Lord David Drummond (d. 1571) and Lilias Ruthven.

Until his father's death in 1634, he was known as John, Lord Erskine, or the "Master of Mar".

Prince Henry, the son of James VI and I and Anne of Denmark was kept at Stirling Castle. After the Union of the Crowns in 1603, King James went to England. Anne of Denmark came to Stirling on 10 May to claim her son. The Earl of Mar was absent. John Erskine and his step-mother Marie Stewart, Countess of Mar denied the queen's request to take Henry away. His father arrived on 12 May and sent him to London with messages for the king. According to the Earl of Mar, King James forgave his family for this, thinking that his "young son and honest poor friends have done nothing but served him faithfully".

John Erskine and other Scottish courtiers were admitted as members of Gray's Inn on 22 May 1603.

John Erskine went to Venice in May 1605 and the ambassador Henry Wotton introduced him to the Doge, Marino Grimani, who complimented him on his noble good looks.

Erskine took part in the masque at the wedding of John Ramsay, Viscount Haddington and Elizabeth Radclyffe, daughter of Robert Radclyffe, 5th Earl of Sussex in February 1608 known as Lord Haddington's Masque or The Hue and Cry After Cupid. Erskine was knighted on 30 May 1610 at the creation of Prince Henry as Prince of Wales.

A detailed bill for Lord Erskine's clothes from an English tailor survives from May 1611. In 1612 Erskine unsuccessfully advocated for a knighthood to be given to the laird of Findlater. In September 1613 Erskine hosted the Venetian ambassador Antonio Foscarini at Stirling Castle. Foscarini had travelled to Scotland after discussing the country with Anne of Denmark.

Repairs to Edinburgh Castle and Holyrood Palace in 1624 made by a carpenter Arthur Hamilton include work in "Lady Erskyne's studie" and "Lady Marre's gallery". A blacksmith Thomas Brown made new fittings for Lord Erskine's hall door in the castle.

On 29 December 1634, John Erskine wrote from Edinburgh Castle to Charles I with news of his father's death.

In 1638 he wrote to king about the poor state of repair of Stirling Castle and the walls of the park, and the Earl of Traquair was ordered to make repairs.

In 1645 Robert Farquharson of Invercauld was the keeper of Kildrummy Castle for the earl and his son Lord Erskine. The laird of Glenkindie also helped to keep the castle, fearing the depredations that a garrison of "stranger" soldiers would make on his lands.

The main residence of the Earl of Mar was Alloa Tower.

== Marriage and children ==
In 1610 he married Christian Hay (d. 1668), a daughter of Francis Hay, 9th Earl of Erroll and Elizabeth Douglas, a daughter of William Douglas, 6th Earl of Morton and Agnes Leslie, Countess of Morton. A record of their marriage ceremony at Edinburgh Castle on 6 February calls her "Lady Jane Hay". King James had reservations about her religion as she came from a Catholic family and he sent advice to her father-in-law.

Their children included:

- John Erskine, later Earl of Mar
- Francis Erskine (d. 1662)
- Elizabeth Erskine, who married Archibald Napier, 2nd Lord Napier of Merchiston. She was a prisoner in Edinburgh Castle in August 1645 with her sister-in-law Lilias Napier.
- Mary Erskine

The Earl of Erroll wrote to Lord Erskine on 14 October 1613 to congratulate him on the birth of a son, and requesting his wife return to him, as he was ill himself.

Peerage of Scotland
Preceded by John Erskine	Earl of Mar; 1634–1654	Succeeded by John Erskine
