= Margaret Croft =

Margaret Croft or Crofts (died 1637) was an English aristocrat.

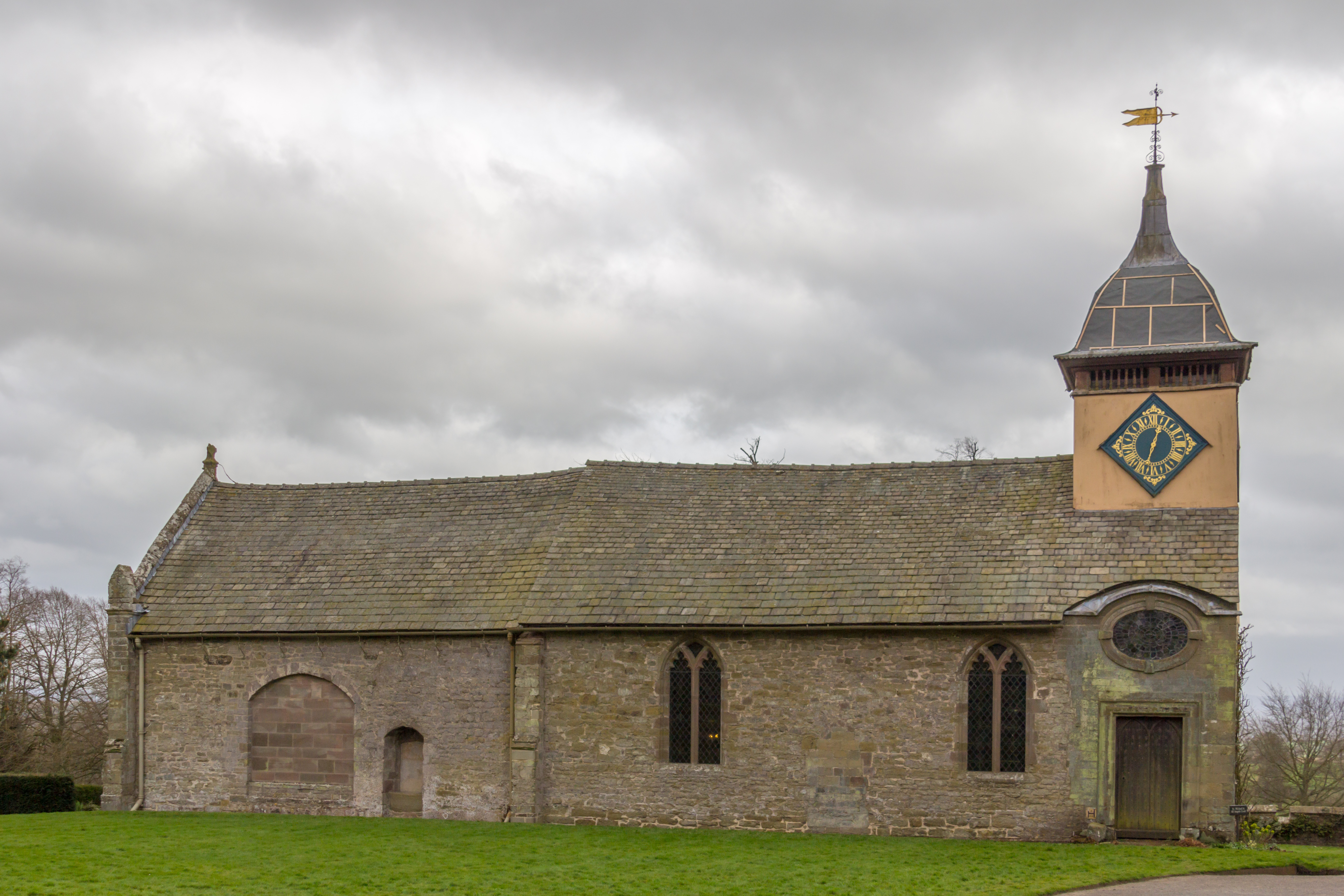
Croft Church at Croft Castle, Herefordshire

== Family background ==
She was a daughter of Sir Herbert Croft of Croft Castle and Mary Bourne, daughter and heiress of Anthony Bourne of Holt Castle, Worcestershire.

Her father converted to Catholicism and died either in 1622 or in 1629, at Douai. Her brother Herbert Croft also converted but returned to the Church of England and became Bishop of Hereford. Margaret Croft or her sister Mary replied to her father's Catholic pamphleteering, and he responded in print with, Reply to the Answer of his Daughter M. C. which she made to a Paper of his sent to her concerning the Rom. Church (1619). Her sister Mary Croft (b. 1598) married Richard Tomkyns of Monnington, and a letter of her cousin Brilliana Harley records a rumour she was involved in drafting an anti-Parliamentarian pamphlet of 1642, The Declaration or Resolution of the County of Hereforde. Lucy Croft married Sir Dudley Carleton, a diplomat at The Hague. Elizabeth Croft (d. 1622) married Sir Thomas Cave, and her portrait is shown at Croft Castle.

The lady in waiting to Elizabeth of Bohemia known as "Margaret Crofts" has sometimes been identified as the sister of William Crofts, Baron Crofts of Saxham (died 1677). William Crofts carrled letters to Elizabeth of Bohemia. However, the will of Margaret Croft from Herefordshire seems to identify her as this royal servant.

== Working for the Queen of Bohemia ==
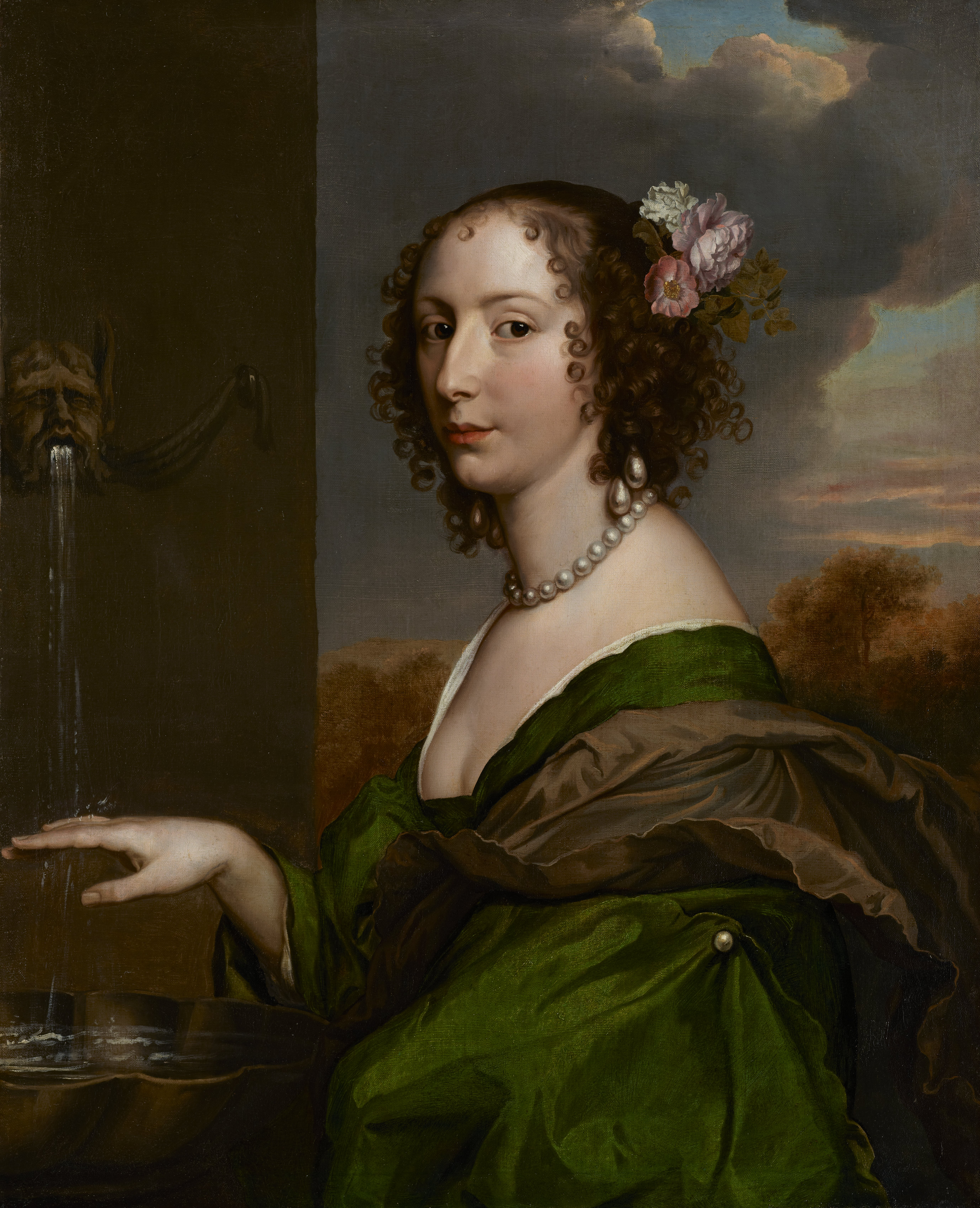
"Margaret Crofts told Lucy Hay, Countess of Carlisle scandal from The Hague

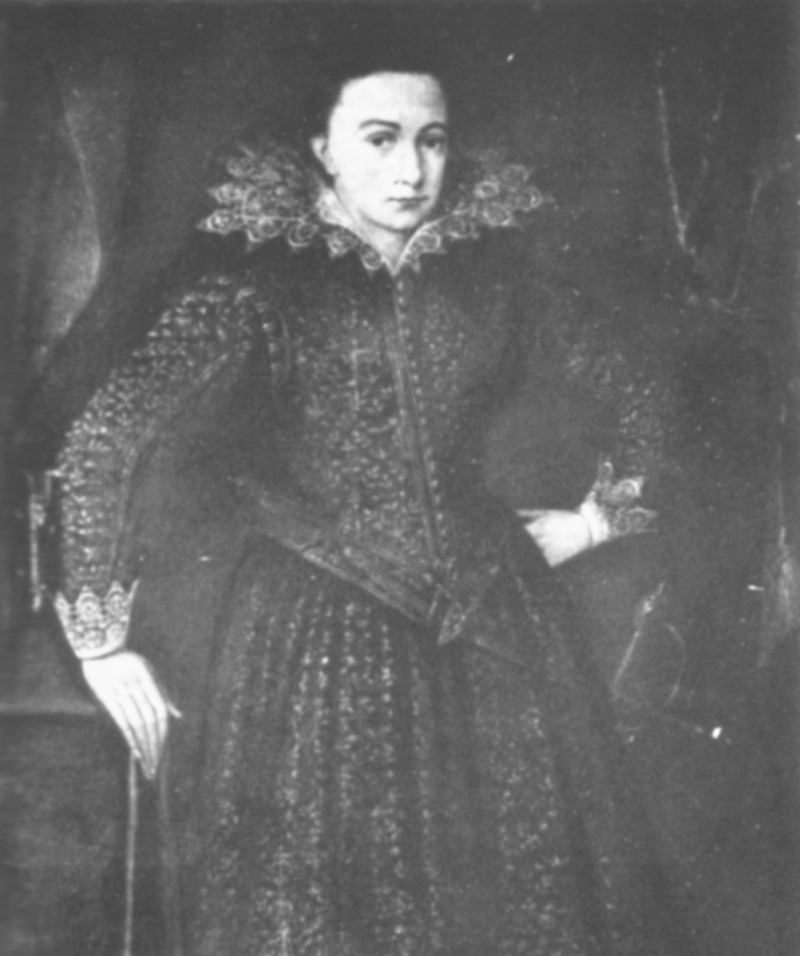
Croft was said to be the mistress of Philipp Moritz, Count of Hanau-Münzenberg

Margaret Croft or Crofts became a maid of honour or lady in waiting to Elizabeth Stuart, Queen of Bohemia in 1623. She was often known as "Mrs Crofts". Anne Carleton, the wife of her brother-in-law Dudley Carleton, had advised against this choice, writing that Croft had scurvy, an indicator that she was idle.

In 1625 Elizabeth wrote letters to John, Earl of Mar and Marie, Countess of Mar about one of their sons, perhaps Henry or Alexander, who had asked her if he could marry Croft, after she noticed their relationship. Elizabeth recommended Croft as "an honest discreet woman and doth carie herself very well". No marriage ensued, Mar wrote to the queen in May 1626 that he could not have Alexander (or his seven brethren) marry according to her wishes. Mar gave no particular reason in the letter, the historian Lisa Jardine points to a disparity in status. Thereafter Croft became linked with members of the Dutch court, especially Constantijn Huygens.

Croft was probably the author of a humorous account of a tour of North Holland taken by Elizabeth and Amalia van Solms in the summer of 1625. The account, written in French, was said to have been taken from a letter written in cipher from a maid of honour to her cousin in England. The French title is, "'Copie d'une lettre interceptée & deschiffrée en passant entre une des filles d'honneur de la royne de Boheme, & une Damoisselle sa Cousine en Angleterre". The narrative is very different from formal accounts of royal progresses, and another lady-in-waiting Elizabeth Dudley, Countess of Löwenstein, a daughter of John Dudley, features in several comic episodes.

Croft has been identified as the mistress of "H", Philipp Moritz, Count of Hanau-Münzenberg, described in Frederick's letters.

Charles I Louis, Elector Palatine, Elizabeth's son, put in a good word for Croft's brother Herbert Croft with the Archbishop of Canterbury at Oxford in August 1636.

== Disgrace and Death ==
She returned to England in 1637. She had offended Elizabeth, who wanted the exact reasons for her dismissal kept secret, partly because they would prejudice Croft's chances of getting a reward from King Charles and partly to prevent their public airing, and told them to Sir Richard Cave, rather than put them in a letter.

Charles Louis wrote to Elizabeth, his mother, on 24 May 1637 from Whitehall Palace, mentioning an old quarrel he had with Croft, that she had fallen out with his sister Elisabeth of the Palatinate and that recently she had told Lord Craven he was rude to her. In a second letter of 12 June 1637 from Greenwich Palace he described how Croft in conversation with Lady Carlisle had "well stitched" most of the characters of Elizabeth's court at The Hague with "censure sharp enough", probably written in verse. He wanted her to stay in London where she could do less harm. There was already a troublesome rumour that Elizabeth Dudley, Countess of Löwenstein, had boxed his sister Elisabeth's ear in the Prince of Orange's garden.

Margaret Croft died in London in 1637 and was buried in Westminster Abbey on 14 December 1637. In her will she hoped the Queen of Bohemia would settle her debts at The Hague amounting to £100. In London she owed Mr Berry in Paternoster Row for white satin for a waistcoat and mohair for a gown.

== The Erskine connection ==
The historian Nadine Akkerman proposes that the Erskine connection of Margaret Croft may have resulted in the compilation, many years later, of a memoir of the childhood and education of Princess Elizabeth at Coombe Abbey. The 1772 publication was probably authored or brought to the press by Frances Erskine (1715-1776), a daughter of John Erskine, Earl of Mar (1675–1732). Akkerman demonstrates the Memoirs Relating to the Queen of Bohemia ought to be regarded by historians as a secondary source. The Memoir includes some anachronistic detail, including a mention of a microscope invented by Cornelius Drebbel and the findings of the naturalist Maria Sibylla Merian.
