= Spanish blanks plot =

Alleged pro-Spanish Catholic conspiracy in Scotland, 1592

The Spanish blanks plot was an alleged pro-Spanish Catholic conspiracy in Scotland, discovered in late 1592. A number of letters to Spain were discovered, which included blank sheets signed by prominent nobles.

== Background ==
The Spanish Armada had failed in its attempt to conquer England in 1588. The undeclared Anglo-Spanish War continued, however. The Kingdom of Scotland under James VI was divided over religion, despite the formal ascendancy of the Church of Scotland, at this time in a presbyterian form. The Scottish nobility were turbulent, while the king was working to assert administrative and political control of the country against factional and religious strife. A Jesuit mission concerned with Scotland included William Crichton and Robert Abercromby; it looked to help from Spain to further the aims of the Counter-Reformation in the British Isles.

== Discovery ==
Andrew Knox, Minister of Paisley was sent to arrest George Kerr, son of Mark Kerr of Newbattle. George Kerr was about to sail to Spain from the west coast of Scotland and carried incriminating correspondence. He was arrested at night on the Isle of Cumbrae. The "Spanish blanks" which were found with other letters in a chest on Kerr's boat, were documents signed by four members of the Catholic nobility of Scotland, and otherwise left to be filled in. At first, the English diplomat Robert Bowes supposed the blanks had been written in invisible ink written with "white vitriol".

James VI and Anne of Denmark were at Alloa Tower celebrating the wedding of the Earl of Mar and Marie Stewart, festivities were cut short when Sir John Carmichael and Sir George Home arrived from Edinburgh with news of the crisis. James VI rode to Edinburgh, where the kirk minister Robert Bruce and Robert Bowes explained their understanding of the situation and threat to him.

George Kerr, his servant, and the letters were taken to Edinburgh and examined by the Privy Council on 2 January 1593. Under torture, Kerr said that the blanks were to be filled in by Crichton, to forward a Spanish invasion. Damagingly for James VI (it has been said), Kerr was also carrying a copy of a position paper by the king on the possible advantages to him in accepting Spanish help.

== Investigation ==
Three prominent Earls were directly implicated:

- William Douglas, 10th Earl of Angus
- Francis Hay, 9th Earl of Erroll
- George Gordon, 6th Earl of Huntly

The fourth signature on the papers discovered was that of Sir Patrick Gordon of Auchindoun. Erroll and Huntly were given a date of 5 February to appear and explain themselves: they did not do so, and went to ground in the north. The king was confronted by them on 24 October, on the road from Soutra to Fala, south-east of Edinburgh; they explained that the blanks related to their support for the Jesuits in Scotland.

Others involved were:

- Alexander, Lord Home
- Sir James Chisholm of Cromlix
- David Graham, Laird of Fintry. A Catholic, he was questioned by John Cockburn of Ormiston and others, and executed on 15 February 1593.
- Hew Barclay of Ladyland.
- John Ogilvy

== Aftermath ==
An official account of the plot appeared in February 1593; it is assumed it was edited by John Davidson. It by no means included all the intercepted letters; but it printed a number concerned with William Sempill in 1589; the connection was that when Sempill's servant Pringle was found in England carrying letters to the Duke of Parma, they had included some from Huntly and Erroll.

Perceptions of James VI shifted after the discoveries: some assumed the affair showed the king had at least tacitly approved dealings with Spain, and many more put it down to slackness in anti-Catholic measures.

Elizabeth I sent a reward of £100 to Andrew Knox, entrusted to Anne of Denmark's goldsmith Elias Le Tellier.
