= Henry Erskine, Master of Cardross =

Scottish landowner (died 1628)

Henry Erskine, Master of Cardross (died 1628) was a Scottish landowner.

He was a son of John Erskine, Earl of Mar (1558–1634) and Marie Stewart.

He, or more likely, his older half-brother, the Master of Mar, danced in Lord Haddington's masque in 1608.

== Grand Tour ==
Henry and his brother Alexander Erskine took an extended Grand Tour in France and Italy from 1617 to 1620 with their tutor John Schaw. They went to Bourges to see their grandmother and to Glatigny where their aunt was a nun. In Venice they met Henry Wotton. Financing an international trip was complicated. James Hudson wrote to the Earl that he had met Sergeant Bowie in London's Royal Exchange, who said that Henry and Alexander were doing well. Hudson arranged a money transfer involving Philip Burlamachi, but Schaw reported matters had gone awry. Money arrived in October 1617. Henry wrote to the Earl that there were so many Scottish travellers and students in Bourges that they were not able to learn the French language, but only spole in Scots to their compatriots. Schaw wrote that they learned dancing, fencing, tennis, and how to play the lute. Henry was better than Alexander at these exercises.

== Later career ==
In March 1624 he wrote to his father from London, with news of the parliament. It had been decided to formally abandon the Spanish Match. His brother Alexander Erskine was raise a company of Scots horsemen for the Prince of Orange. He had not written to his mother, as he did not want to get involved in the affairs of his lately deceased uncle, Ludovic Stewart, 2nd Duke of Lennox, despite the unwelcome intervention of George Elphinstone.

Elizabeth Stuart, Queen of Bohemia suggested that one of the Erskines, Alexander or Henry, should marry one of her ladies in waiting, Mistress Margaret or Margery Croft (d. 1637), a daughter of the Catholic Sir Herbert Croft of Croft Castle and Mary Bourne. The marriage plan, which did not take place, was examined by Lisa Jardine, who supposed that Croft was not of sufficient status to marry the son of an earl.

Henry Erskine married Margaret Bannatyne or Bellenden in 1626, daughter of Sir James Bellenden of Broughton.

Their son David Erskine succeeded to the barony of Cardross, and in 1646 married Anne Hope, daughter of Sir Thomas Hope.
