= Clan Farquharson =

Highland Scottish clan

- Clann Fhearchair
- Crest: On a chapeau Gules furred Ermine, a demi-lion Gules holding in his dexter paw a sword Proper
- Motto: Fide et Fortitudine ("By Faith and Fortitude")
- Slogan: I force nae freen, I fear nae foe
- War cry: Carn Na Cuimhne

Profile
- Plant badge: Scots fir

Chief
- Philip Farquharson of Invercauld, 17th Baron of Invercauld and Monaltrie
- Chief of the Name and Arms of Farquharson (Mac Mhic Fhionnlaigh)
- Seat: Invercauld Castle (historically)
Septs of Clan Farquharson
Achenhove, Alford, Archer
Barr, Barrie, Berry, Birse, Bowman, Bremner, Brebner, Brown, Buckie, Bunzeon
Caig, Cay, Candvane, Carracher, Carnequhen, Cattanach, Chree, Christie, Clearch, Cloak, Clinter, Clune, Coates, Colston, Coutts, Cromar
Dagg, DeBarry, Dee, Don, Dorward, Dow, Downie
Ego, Erracher
Farquhar, Ferres, Finlayson, Findlay
Glennie, Gracie, Grassick
Hardie, Hogg
Kellas, Kellock, Kerracher
Leys, Lyon
MacCaig, MacCarly, Maccartney, MacErchar, MacFuktor, MacHardy, MacInley, MacKaig, MacKerracher, MacKinley, Mellis, Michie, Morgan
Patrickson, Patton, Patterson
Quaid, Quaite
Reekie, Rioch, Rust
Skaid, Sleaster, Sleigh, Soutar, Strathdee, Sutter
Tawse, Testard, Tester, Tough
Waite, Wardle, Watt, Wood
Clan branches
Invercauld, Aberarder, Allargue, Balmoral, Breda, Castleton, Finzean, Haughton, Inverey, Monaltrie, Whitehouse
Allied clans
Chattan Confederation
Clan Mackintosh
Clan MacPherson
Clan MacPhail
Clan MacBean
Clan Shaw of Tordarroch
Clan MacGillivray
Clan Davidson
Clan MacQueen
MacIntyres of Badenoch
the Macleans of Dochgarroch
Clan Buchan
Clan Stewart
Rival clans
Clan Erskine
Clan MacThomas

Clan Farquharson (/ˈfɑːr.kər.sən/; Scottish Gaelic: Clann Fhearchair [ˈkʰl̪ˠãũn̪ˠ ˈfɛɾɛxɪɾʲ]) is a Highland Scottish clan based at Invercauld and Braemar, Aberdeenshire, and is a member of the Chattan Confederation.

== History ==
=== Origins ===
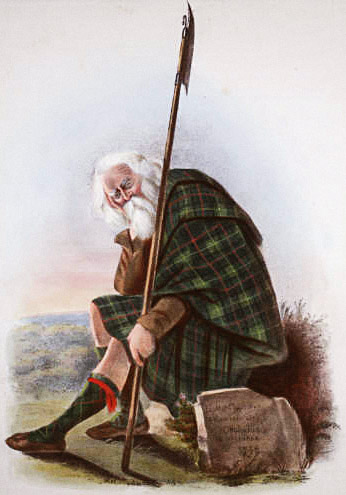
A romantic depiction of a clansman illustrated by R. R. McIan, from James Logan's The Clans of the Scottish Highlands, 1845.

The chiefs of the Clan Farquharson trace their ancestry back to Farquhar, fourth son of Alexander "Ciar" of Rothiemurchus. Alexander Shaw was the fifth chief of the Clan Shaw. His descendants took the name Farquharson. Another of Alexander's sons was Donald, who married Isobel Stewart, the heiress of Invercauld. Donald's son was Finla Mor who was the real progenitor of the clan. MacFionlaigh Mòr is the Scottish Gaelic patronymic. Finla Mor was the royal banner bearer at the Battle of Pinkie Cleugh in 1547 where he was killed. However he produced nine sons over two marriages from which the important cadet branches of the clan were sprung and the clan grew in stature.

=== Relationship with the Clan Chattan Confederation ===
Up to this point Clan Farquaharson was not part of the Clan Chattan Confederation who occasionally raided their lands. There is story of a Chattan spy, Lamont of Inverey who was caught by the Farquaharsons in 1589 and hanged on a charge of stealing livestock. The tree, a Scots fir was subsequently called the Farquharsons Hanging Tree and became the plant symbol of the clan.

In February 1592, the Catholic Earl of Huntly murdered his Protestant rival, James Stuart, the Earl of Moray, at Donibristle. Because the Clan Chattan Confederation (led by the Mackintoshes) were loyal vassals to the murdered Earl of Moray, they swore vengeance against Huntly. In late 1592, Clan Chattan Confederation launched a raid into Huntly's territories in Strathdee and Glenmuick. The raiders slaughtered four prominent Gordons, including Henry Gordon of Knock Castle and the Baron of Brackley. Furious, the Earl of Huntly secured a royal commission to crush the rebels and marched an army into Deeside to execute accomplices and any relatives of the Clan Chattan Confederation. Huntly's forces laid waste to the lands, burned down homes, slaughtering every man they could find. Huntly kidnapped 60 to 80 young orphaned children to his seat at Strathbogie Castle. To feed them, Huntly constructed a massive wooden pig trough. The children were forced to sit on either side, to eat out of the trough like animals. During a visit, the Laird of Grant was so deeply horrified by the sight of the Deeside orphans that he made a deal with Huntly. Grant took half the children back to Strathspey to raise them as Grants, while Huntly kept the other half, who grew up with the name Gordon.

Though Huntly's 1592 campaign dealt a near-fatal blow to the Deeside populace, the Farquharson's survived through the young sons of Finlay Mòr. Recognising that they were too exposed to Huntly's aggression, by 1595 the Clan Farquharson joined the Chattan Confederation and signed a bond of manrent that acknowledged the chief of Clan Mackintosh, who was also chief of Clan Chattan Confederation as their "natyff cheiff".

=== Relationship with the Earldom of Mar ===
Towards the end of the 16th century the Clan Erskine chiefs set out to claim the Earldom of Mar but they were opposed by the increasing power of the Farquharsons. In 1628 Braemar Castle was built by John Erskine (Earl of Mar) as a bulwark against them, but in 1716 it fell into the hands of the Clan Farquharson. The clan became known as the fighting Farquharsons due to their fierce reputation and they became strong supporters of the Stuarts.

=== 17th century, clan conflicts and Civil War ===
During the Scottish Civil War Donald Farquharson of Monaltrie fought for James Graham, 1st Marquess of Montrose in 1644, and then for Charles II at the Battle of Worcester in 1651. John Farquharson of Inverey was known as the Black Colonel and burned Braemar Castle. John supported James VII of Scotland and followed John Graham, 1st Viscount Dundee in 1689. After Dundee's death in 1689 the Clan Farquharson supported his successor, Thomas Buchan of the Clan Buchan.

In the late 17th century the Earl of Airlie came into dispute with the Clan MacThomas over the lands of Canlochcan. Airlie's legal action was successful but the chief of Clan MacThomas refused to recognize this and continued to pasture his cattle on the disputed land. In response Airlie used his legal right to lease the land to men of the Clan Farquharson which led to a feud. On 28 January 1673 Farquharson of Broughdearg was killed along with two sons of the chief of Clan MacThomas. The lawsuits that followed crippled the MacThomas chief.

On the south side of the Black Isle, Ross-shire, are McFarquhar's Cave and McFarquhar's Bed which are apparently named after a 17th-century smuggler.

=== 18th century and Jacobite risings ===
During the Jacobite rising of 1715 another John Farquharson of Invercauld was a colonel in the Chattan Confederation regiment which supported James Francis Edward Stuart. Farquharson was taken prisoner at the Battle of Preston (1715). He was held at Marshalsea Prison and was condemned to be executed at the Tower of London, however he and two other highland officers were reprieved on the morning of execution. He was paroled and not allowed to return to Scotland for over twenty years. General Wade's report on the Highlands in 1724, estimated the combined clan strength of the Farquharsons and Mackintoshes at 800 men.

In 1745 the strength of the Clan was estimated as 500 by Duncan Forbes, Lord Culloden. On 23 December 1745, 300 men of the Clan Farquharson had fought as Jacobites in their victory at the Battle of Inverurie (1745). During the Jacobite rising of 1745, the cousin of John Farquharson was Lady Anne Farquharson-MacKintosh who was wife of Angus Mackintosh, chief of Clan Mackintosh. Angus Mackintosh was in fact a serving officer in the Black Watch regiment of the British Army and he was captured at the Battle of Prestonpans by Jacobite forces. Mackintosh was sent home to Moy having been given parole not to take arms against the Jacobites and when he arrived he was greeted by his wife, Anne Farquharson, who said "Your servant, captain" to which he replied "Your servant, colonel". She was ever after known as Colonel Anne. Anne later saved Charles Edward Stuart from capture in what is known as the Rout of Moy. Anne was imprisoned for six weeks after the Battle of Culloden. Francis Farquharson of Monaltrie led the Farquharsons at the Battle of Culloden and although he survived he was imprisoned and was condemned to death, but was lucky enough to have his execution reduced to exile.

The McFarquhars of Redcastle on the Black Isle were Jacobites.

== Modern clan ==
Alwyne Arthur Compton Farquharson, Chief of the Name and Arms of Farquharson, 16th Baron of Invercauld and Monaltrie, MC, JP; as recognised by Lord Lyon King of Arms died on 6 October 2021. Born 1 May 1919 as Alwyne Arthur Compton, son of Major Edward Robert Francis Compton, of Newby Hall, Ripon, Yorkshire, and of Torloisk, Aros, Isle of Mull, Scotland (grandson of William Compton, 4th Marquess of Northampton) and Sylvia Farquharson of Invercauld, he was confirmed MacFionnlaidh by Lyon Court in 1949, having taken the name of Farquharson. He served with distinction as a captain in the Royal Scots Greys during World War Two. Captain Farquharson resided at Valley Farm, Norfolk with his second wife, Madame Patricia Farquharson. He is succeeded by his great-nephew Philip Farquharson of Invercauld, 17th Baron of Invercauld and Monaltrie, Chief of the Name and Arms of Farquharson.

On 12 August 2025, Chief Philip Farquharson of Invercauld & Monaltrie presented his new Coat of Arms for inspection by King Charles III in Ballater. Presentation of Chief Philip Farquharson's new Coat of Arms to His Majesty King Charles III

On 2 July 2026, Chief Philip Farquharson of Invercauld & Monaltrie ratified the sept names of Clan Farquharson. The proclamation can be seen at Septs of Clan Farquharson – Clan Farquharson

== Castles ==
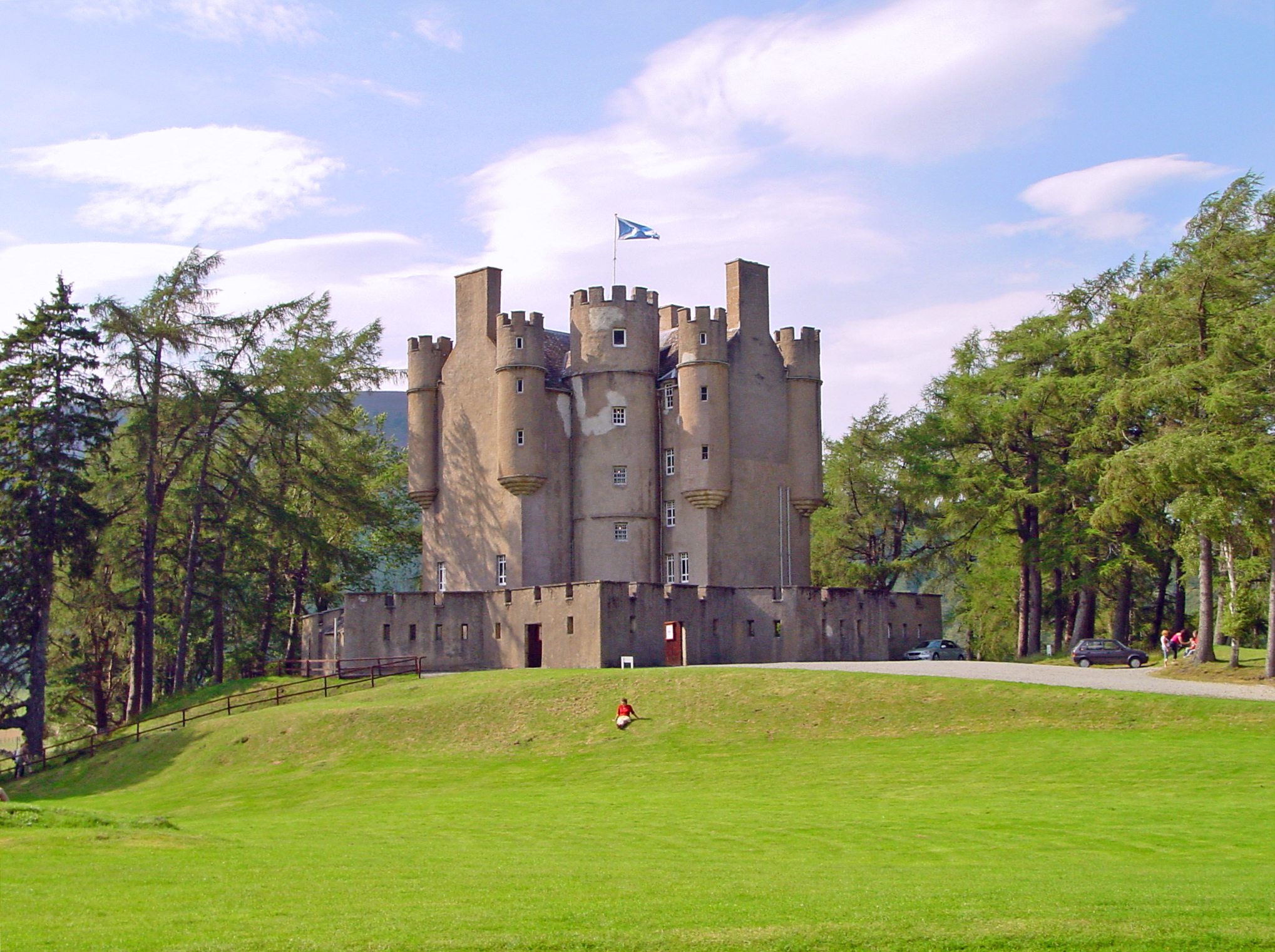
Braemar Castle

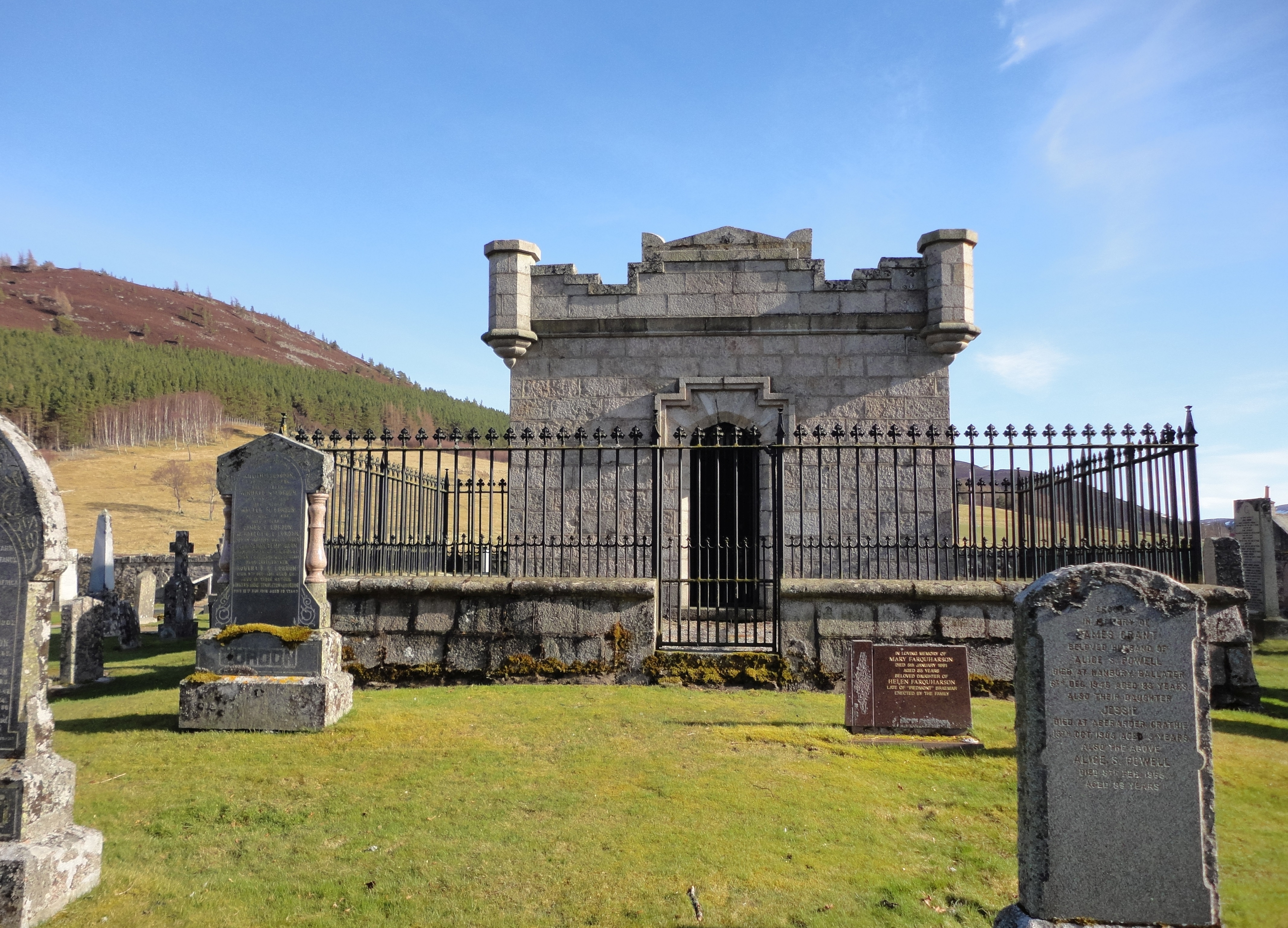
Farquharson mausoleum in Braemar Kirkyard near Braemar Castle

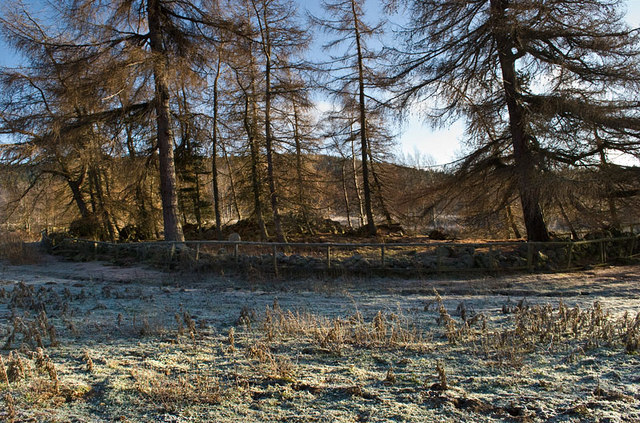
Carn na Cuimbne or the Cairn of Memory is among the trees on the north bank of the river. It was here that the Clan Farquharson mustered their men and prepared for whatever battle they had been summoned to fight. Each man left a stone on the cairn and removed it when he returned. The stones which remained marked the number of those who had died.

Castles held by the Farquhars and Farquharsons have included:

- Invercauld House, two miles north-east of Braemar in Aberdeenshire is a solid castellated mansion with a massive tower, battlements and turrets. It is built with an old tower house built into its fabric. It was originally held by the Clan Stewart but passed to the Farquharsons when Donald Farquharson married the heiress of Invercauld. Their son was the Findlay Mor who was the Royal Standard Bearer at the Battle of Pinkie Cleugh in 1547 and was killed there. It was from here that the Earl of Mar, leader of the Jacobite rising of 1715 called out the Jacobites and the Farquharsons of Invercauld still flourish.
- Inverey Castle, four miles west of Braemar, was the seat of John Farquharson of Inverey, the Black Colonel, who murdered John Gordon of Brackley in 1666 as recorded in the old ballad The Baron o' Brackley. John Farquharson of Inverey defeated a force attacking Braemar Castle, which he then torched. Inverey was demolished in 1689 following the Battle of Killiecrankie.
- Kindrochit Castle The ruins of an 11th Century castle built by King Malcolm Canmore. The remains are located in Braemar across from the local butchery shop.
- Braemar Castle, just north-east of Braemar is a seventeenth century L-plan tower house with crowning turrets. It is defended by star shaped artillery defences that date from the next century. The castle was built by the Earl of Mar in 1628 but because they did not support James VII of Scotland in 1689, the castle was seized and torched by John Farquharson of Inverey, the Black Colonel. When the Jacobite rising of 1715 fizzled out the castle passed to the Farquharsons of Invercauld.
- Monaltrie House was held by the Farquharsons who fought for James Graham, 1st Marquess of Montrose in the 1640s and then for Charles II at the Battle of Worcester in 1651. Francis Farquharson of Monaltrie led the Farquharsons at the Battle of Culloden and although he survived he was imprisoned and was condemned to death, but was lucky enough to have his execution reduced to exile. Monaltrie house was burned after the Battle of Culloden.
- Gilmilnscroft, four miles south-east of Mauchline in Ayrshire, is a T-plan house that was held by the Farquhars and dates from the seventeenth century. It may incorporate a tower house and the lands were held by the Farquhars from the fourteenth to twentieth century. The building was restored in 1968 and is still occupied.
- Mounie Castle, three miles north-west of Oldmeldrum, Aberdeenshire is an altered seventeenth century T-plan house with a round stair tower that passed from the Clan Seton to the Farquhars in 1634 and then to the Clan Hay in 1701.
- Tolquhon Castle, four miles east of Oldmeldrum, is a courtyard castle with a range of buildings and a drum towered gatehouse. The original castle was built by the Prestons of Craigmillar but passed to the Clan Forbes in 1420 who built the present castle. It was sold to the Farquhars in 1716.

== Tartans ==
Tartan image	Notes
	Clanhiunla, or Farquharsonnes tartan, as published in 1842 in Vestiarium Scoticum.
	Farquharson Modern
	Farquharson Dress

== Clan profile ==
- Crest: On a chapeau Gules furred Ermine, a demi-lion Gules holding in his dexter paw a sword Proper.
- Motto: Fide et Fortitudine ("Fidelity and Fortitude") and (On compartment) I force nae freen, I fear nae foe.
- Gathering the Clan for battle: The Farquharsons would gather at the Carn na Cuimhe beside the river Dee, east of Invercauld. A fire cross is said to have been sent around the clan lands by runners to notify fighting men to gather.

There are several tartans attributed to the name Farquharson.

== See also ==
- Scottish clan
