= Anne McKay =

- Born: Anne MacLeod; Skye
- Years active: 1740s - 1750s
- Known for: Helping Jacobite prisoner escape

Anne McKay née MacLeod (fl. 1740s-1750s) was imprisoned for hiding members of the defeated Jacobite army in Inverness in the aftermath of the Battle of Culloden.

Anne McKay was born in Skye, a Gaelic speaker with very little English. She boarded in Inverness with her children during the Jacobite Rebellion of 1745. After the Battle of Culloden on 16 April 1746, McKay's cellar was used to imprison MacDonald of Belfinlay and Robert Nairn, a prominent Jacobite and deputy paymaster. Robert Forbes, a nineteenth-century memoirist, noted that McKay was 'a wise, sagacious creature' who was called upon to help the injured prisoners. When an escape plan was made, McKay helped by bringing clothes and food for Nairn and distracting the guard.

When the escape was discovered, McKay was interrogated for three days and nights during which time she was not allowed to sit or lie down. Her captors interrogated her using Irish and English and tried to entice her to tell them the names of the co-conspirators using bribery and alcohol. However McKay refused to speak. As punishment, McKay was sentenced to be whipped through the streets of Inverness but avoided it because of intervention by leading Inverness citizens, rumoured to include co-conspirator Lady Anne MacKintosh and Anne Leith. McKay was released after seven weeks of imprisonment. The guard who failed to stop Nairn escape was given 500 lashes.

During McKay's imprisonment, her 17-year-old son was found by British soldiers and beaten so severely that he died of his injuries. In the aftermath of the escape, Robert Nairn's family supported Anne, who had been widowed during the Jacobite Rebellion, and her children financially.

== Additional sources ==
- Craig, Maggie. (1997) Damn' rebel bitches: the women of the '45. Mainstream Pub.: Edinburgh.
- Harrower-Gray, Annie. (2014) Scotland's Hidden Harlots & Heroines: Women's Role in Scottish Society from 1690 to 1969: Pen & Sword.
