= Anne Mackintosh =

Scottish Jacobite

Anne Mackintosh (1723–1787) was a Scottish Jacobite supporter and organiser who was the daughter of the Chief of Clan Farquharson and the wife of Angus Mackintosh, Chief of the Clan Mackintosh. She became known as "Colonel Anne" for her role in raising men for the Jacobite army during the Jacobite rising of 1745.

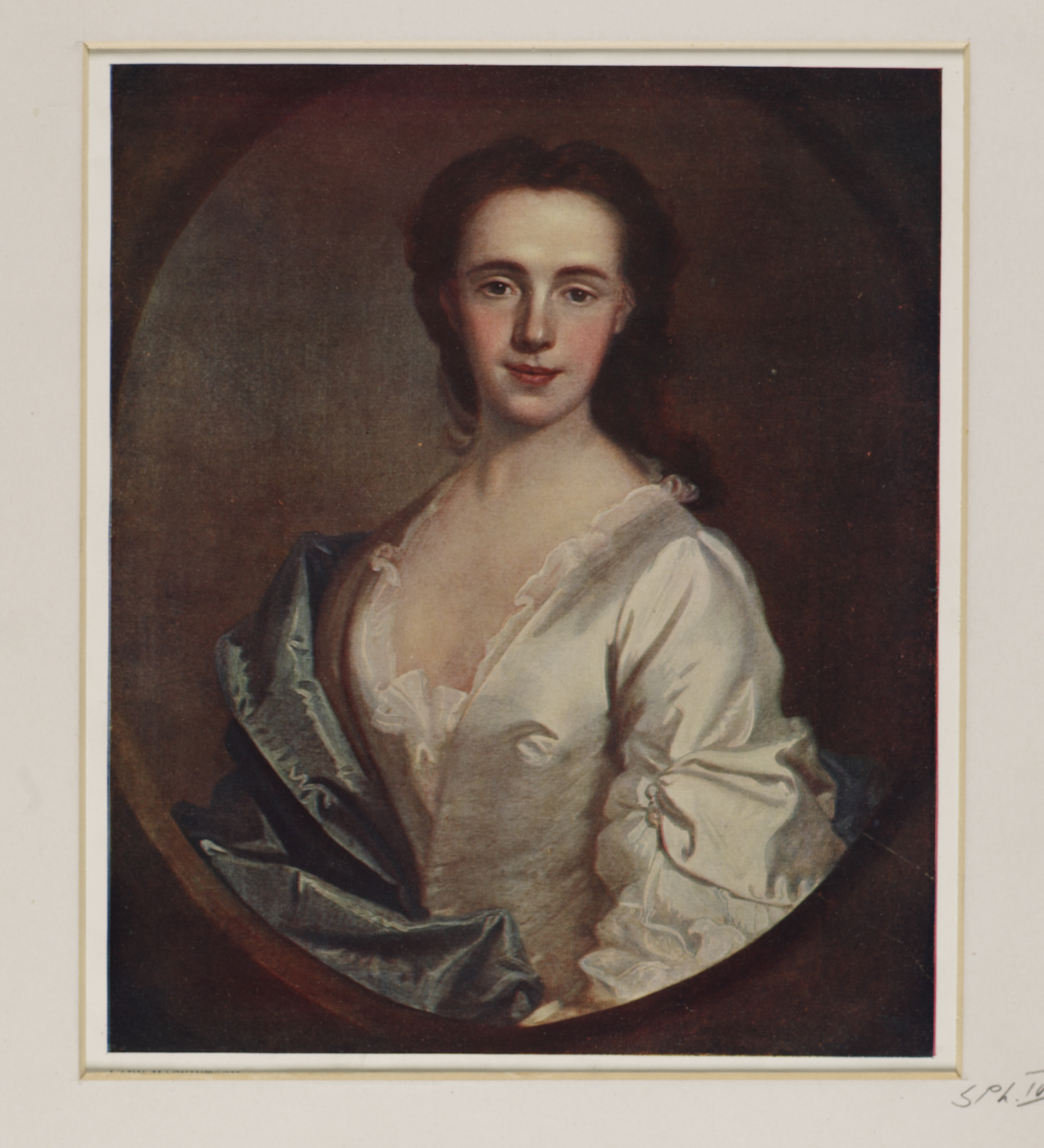
Portrait of Anne Mackintosh

== Early life ==
Born Anne Farquharson at Invercauld Castle, Aberdeenshire in 1723, she was the daughter of John Farquharson of Invercauld, chief of the Clan Farquharson, by his third wife Margaret Murray. Her mother was a daughter of Lord James Murray of Dowally and thus a granddaughter of the Marquis of Atholl and cousin of Lord George Murray. Her family were Jacobite sympathisers. Around 1741 she was married to Angus (or Aeneas) Mackintosh, chief of the Clan Mackintosh, a committed anti-Jacobite.

== Jacobite rising of 1745 ==
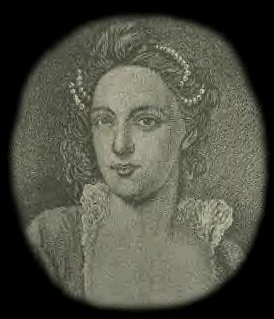
Etching of Colonel Anne Mackintosh

Early in 1744, Angus Mackintosh was offered one of three new Independent Companies being raised by John Campbell, 4th Earl of Loudoun to support the British-Hanoverian Government. During the Jacobite rising of 1745, Angus' company fought in the Black Watch.

When the Jacobite Prince Charles Edward Stuart landed in Scotland in 1745, Anne Mackintosh, then 22 years old, raised between 200 and 400 men from Clan Mackintosh and the confederation of Clan Chattan for the Jacobite cause. As military command was generally held by men, the force was placed under the command of Alexander MacGillivray, chief of the Clan MacGillivray and a member of the clan confederation. Mackintosh's force joined the Prince's army at Bannockburn, near Stirling Castle, in January 1746, twelve days before the Battle of Falkirk Muir.

A month later the Prince was staying at Moy Hall, Mackintosh's home. She received a message from her mother-in-law that 1,500 of Loudon's Highlanders, including her husband's company stationed 8–12 miles away at Inverness, were planning a night raid on Moy Hall to capture the Prince (and claim the £30,000 bounty). Mackintosh sent five of her staff out with guns to make noise and shout clan battle cries, apparently giving the Government forces the impression that they were about to face the entire Jacobite army. The ploy worked and the Government force withdrew. The event became known as "the rout of Moy".

The next month Mackintosh's husband and 300 of Loudon's men were captured north of Inverness by the Jacobite army. The Prince paroled Captain Mackintosh into the custody of his wife, reportedly commenting that "he could not be in better security, or more honourably treated". According to later accounts, she greeted him with the words, "Your servant, captain", to which he replied, "your servant, colonel", giving rise to her nickname "Colonel Anne". She was also said to have been called "La Belle Rebelle" (the beautiful rebel) by the Prince.

Many of the Clan Chattan men who fought at the Battle of Culloden on 16 April 1746 were killed, including Alexander MacGillivray. Their grave is marked by the Well of the Dead on the battlefield. After the Jacobite defeat at Culloden, Mackintosh was arrested and for a time placed in the care of her mother-in-law. She also intervened on behalf of Anne McKay, a local Inverness woman who had helped Jacobite officer Robert Nairn escape and who had been sentenced to be whipped through the streets of Inverness.

Mackintosh later met Prince William, Duke of Cumberland at a social event in London with her husband. According to later accounts, he asked her to dance to a pro-Government tune, and she returned the favour by asking him to dance to a Jacobite tune.

Mackintosh died on 2 March 1787 in Leith, the harbour district of Edinburgh. She is buried in Old North Leith Burial Ground on Coburg Street. Her grave is marked by a commemorative plaque and a white Jacobite rose.

== Historical fiction ==
- Scottish author Janet Paisley wrote a novel based on Mackintosh's exploits, White Rose Rebel, published in 2007.
- Author Marsha Canham wrote the historical romance novel Midnight Honor, based on Mackintosh's exploits and forming the third book of a trilogy about the Jacobite rising, preceded by The Blood of Roses and The Pride of Lions.
- Portuguese author Hélia Correia wrote the historical novel Lillias Fraser, set in Scotland and Portugal between 1746 and 1762, in which Mackintosh is a secondary character.

== See also ==
- Anne McKay (fl. 1740s–1750s)
