= Alloa Tower =

Medieval tower house in Scotland

- Scots Gaelic: Túr Alamhagh
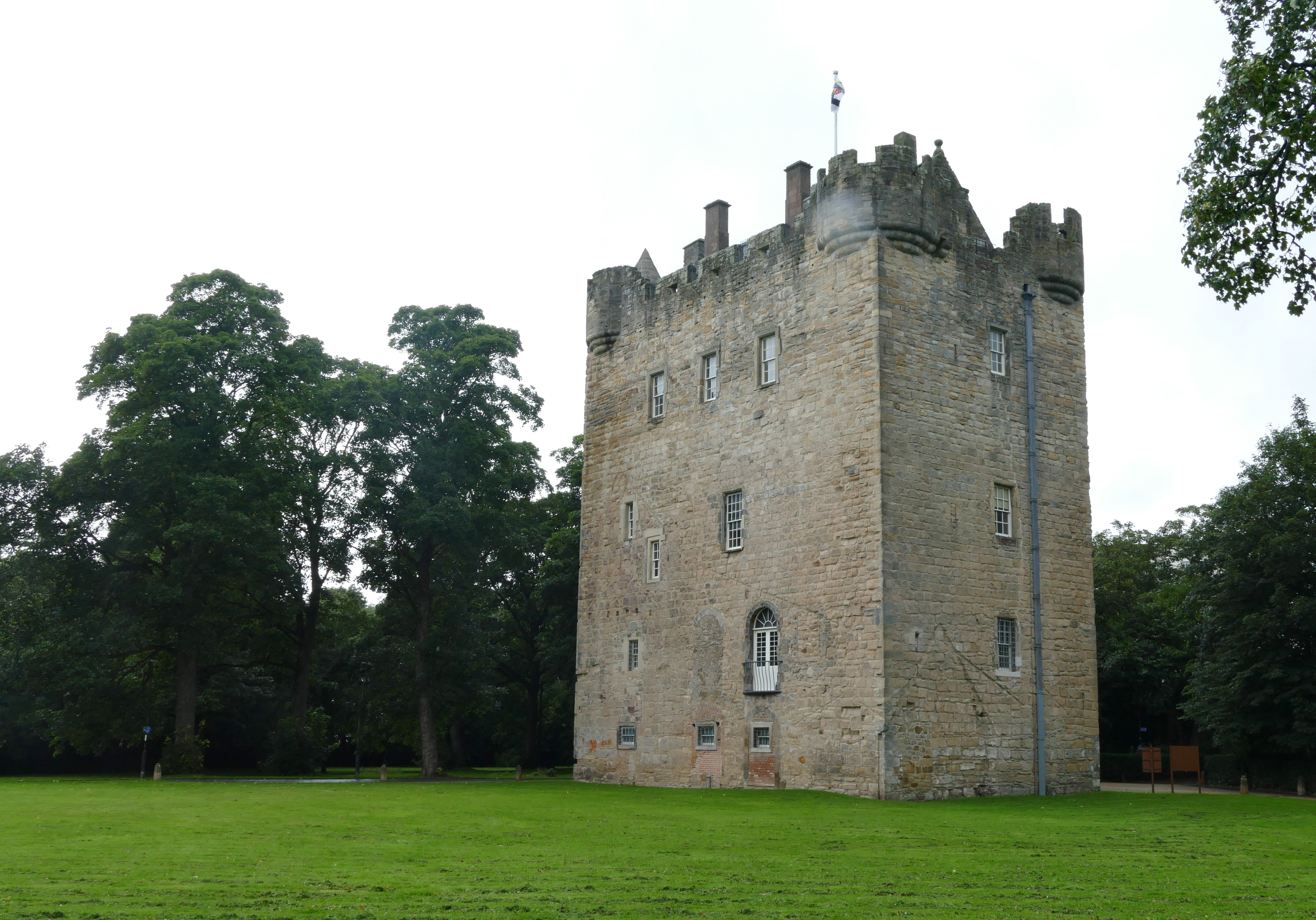
- The tower in 2020
- Interactive map of the Alloa Tower area

General information
- Type: Defensive structure
- Architectural style: Medieval
- Location: Alloa Park, Alloa, Clackmannanshire, FK10 1PP, Scotland
- Coordinates: 56.1186°N 3.7851°W
- Owner: National Trust Scotland

Height
- Height: 68 feet

Technical details
- Material: Stone
- Floor count: 3

Design and construction
- Designations: Category A listed building

Website
- https://www.nts.org.uk/visit/places/alloa-tower

Alloa Tower in Alloa, Clackmannanshire, in central Scotland, is an early 14th-century tower house that served as the medieval residence of the Erskine family, later Earls of Mar. Retaining its original timber roof and battlements, the tower is one of the earliest and largest Scottish tower houses, with immensely thick walls. It was designated as a scheduled monument in 1960 and is now owned by the National Trust for Scotland.

== History ==
The four-storey tower is 68 feet (21 m) high, excluding the attic. The building is made from coursed rubble and measures 62.5 by 39.5 feet (19.1 by 12.0 m) in size. The building has been extensively re-fenestrated during its history, but retains some internal medieval features. It was originally built as part of a line of fortifications defending the north shore of the Firth of Forth. Several 19th-century works, including Groome's Gazetteer, date the tower to the year 1223. Archaeological investigations from the early 1990s date the original fortified house to the early 14th century, where it had a cellar that sometimes served as a pit prison. By the mid-14th century, it had been enlarged with a great hall and rose to three storeys in height, with the entrance on the first floor. In the 15th century, it was further enlarged to four/five levels while retaining its first-floor access.

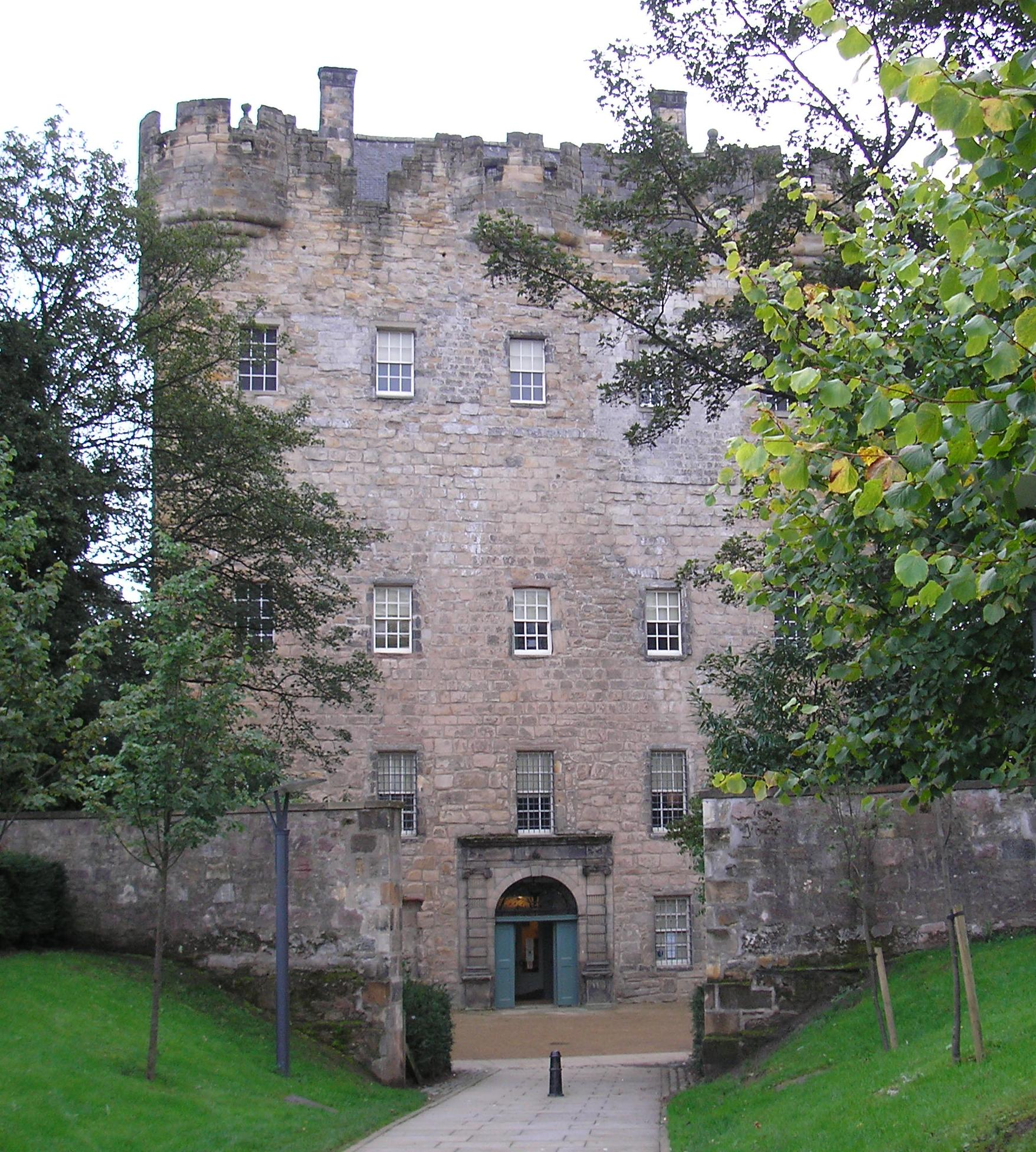
Alloa Tower in 2006

Late in the 16th century, ground-floor access was probably added.

John Erskine, 6th Earl of Mar, built a very large mansion (Alloa House) in 1710 that incorporated the tower as its annexe. Mar wrote:

There is something in the Old Tower, especially if made to conform to the new design, which is venerable for its antiquity & makes not a bad appearance & would make one regret the being obliged to pull it down.

Mar made plans to remodel the tower's interior, but it is unclear what changes were actually made. The house burned down in 1800 and was rebuilt by George Angus in 1834–1838 for the 9th Earl. It was demolished sometime after 1868.

Currently, the tower is a public attraction and hosts events for different holidays like Easter and Christmas.

== Royal history at Alloa ==
In February 1497, the gardener of Alloa brought trees to plant in the garden at Stirling Castle. Margaret Tudor met the Chancellor James Beaton at Alloa on 11 July 1524, to discuss transferring power from Regent Albany to the young James V. James V and Mary of Guise came to Alloa by boat on 7 April 1540.

=== Mary, Queen of Scots ===
Mary, Queen of Scots visited John, Lord Erskine and his wife Annabell Murray at Alloa on 16 June 1562, and again in May 1565. Mary returned to Alloa on 28 July 1566, soon after the birth of Prince James. Some sources say the French ambassador Michel de Castelnau came with the Bishop of Ross to Alloa to congratulate Mary on her safe delivery. They would later exchange dozens of letters in cipher code.

Mary's visit to Alloa subsequently attracted the attention of her enemies, and the details are disputed. A chronicle mentions that she left her servants at Newhaven, and took a small boat to Alloa, crewed by "simple men of seafare trade". According to George Buchanan and the "Book of Articles", the crew were "notorious pirates", associates of the Earl of Bothwell including William and Edmund Blackadder.

On 28 July at Alloa, Mary announced her plans to travel to Jedburgh to hold justice courts. She on 31 July to Annabell Murray's brother-in-law, the Laird of Abercairney, on behalf of the evicted widow of one of his tenants. Claude Nau wrote that Mary's only companions at Alloa were her ladies in waiting and the Earl of Mar, and Darnley only made a brief visit. When Darnley came to Alloa by road, Mary told him to go away. Mary enjoyed dancing at Alloa during this visit. It is also said she went to Stirling in disguise dressed as an ordinary townswoman "in homely sort" and joined in a dance around the Market Cross.

=== James VI and a wedding masque ===
James VI of Scotland stayed at Alloa for four days in August 1580. In December 1592, the widower John Erskine, Earl of Mar, married Marie Stewart, a daughter of Esmé Stewart, 1st Duke of Lennox. James VI and Anne of Denmark gave the bride clothes, and wedding celebrations were held at Alloa following the marriage at Holyroodhouse. One version of the Memoir of David Moysie mentions that the King and Queen were "in Alloway the earle of Mars house at the bankett at Yuill and at Nursemes". Newersmes was a Scots Language word for New Year's Day.

Festivities, customarily held at a bridegroom's family home known as the infare, were mentioned by one of the invited guests, the courtier John Elphinstone. Costume was bought for a masque at Alloa in which Anne of Denmark performed, dancing in silk taffeta and "gold tock", a kind of tinsel fabric. The party was cut short when Sir John Carmichael and Sir George Home arrived from Edinburgh with news of the crisis caused by the discovery of the Spanish blanks. In England, after the Union of the Crowns, Anne would further develop the masque form to articulate her queenship.

== Witch trials ==
John Erskine, the second earl of Mar, is known to have been involved in two trials. The first, in 1596, concerned Margaret Crawford. She had been accused of practicing mass in the Catholic way, and John Erskine was asked to raise a commission for a trial. The second trial, held from 1613–1614, concerned the Erskine of Dun siblings: Robert, Anna, Helen, and Isobel. They were found guilty of consorting with a witch, Janet Irvine, in order to poison their nephews so that they could claim their inheritance.

Between May and August 1658, many residents of Alloa were also involved in a witch-hunt. Margaret Duchell was arrested by the Alloa kirk session, and, after interrogation, confessed to making a pact with the devil, harming others, and attending witches sabbaths with six other witches. Four of these six; Margaret Taylor, Bessie Paton, Janet Black, and Katherine Rainie, were arrested between June and August. Duchell died in prison in May.
