= Kindrochit Castle =

Coordinates: 57°0′16″N 3°23′51″W

- Braemar, Aberdeenshire in Scotland
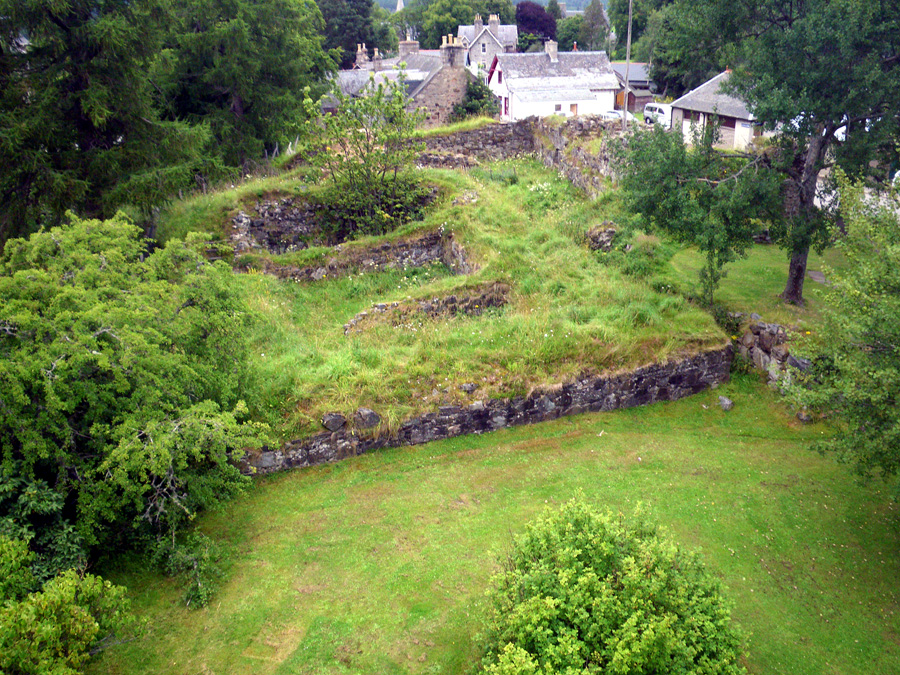
- The ruins of Kindrochit Castle

Site information
- Open to the public: Yes
- Condition: Ruined

Scheduled monument
- Official name: Kindrochit Castle
- Type: Secular: castle
- Designated: 31 January 1967
- Reference no.: SM2583

Kindrochit Castle (/kɪnˈdroʊxɪt/) is a ruined 14th-century fortification in Aberdeenshire, Scotland. It is located at Braemar, in a strategic position on the banks of the Clunie Water, a tributary of the River Dee. The ruins are protected as a scheduled monument.

== History ==
Kindrochit was a hunting seat of King Robert II, who issued charters here most years between 1371 and 1388. In 1390, Robert III granted a licence to Malcolm Drummond to build a new tower on the site. The site of the earlier royal lodge was excavated in the 1920s and included a hall around 30 by 9 metres (98 by 30 ft), with square towers at each corner.

John Erskine, Earl of Mar showed the ruined castle at Kindrochit to John Taylor when the poet made his Pennyles Pilgrimage to Scotland in 1618. Taylor, who rode with the Earl from Braemar Castle, was told that Malcolm Canmore had built the castle in the 11th century. He thought it remarkable because he did not see another house in the next 12 days of their ride.

C. Michael Hogan has suggested that Kindrochit Castle, as well as Kildrummy and Durris Castles, were likely sited based upon strategic positions relative to the ancient Elsick Mounth trackway, which provided a strategic crossing of the Mounth of the Grampian Mountains.

== The Castle Today ==
The present ruins comprise the ground floor of the tower, measuring around 19.3 by 13 metres (63 by 43 ft). Restoration work was carried out in 2013–2014, and the site reopened in Easter 2015. Kindrochit Castle is open to the public (with free access) all year round.
