= Braemar Castle =

Fortification in Aberdeenshire

- Braemar, Aberdeenshire, Scotland
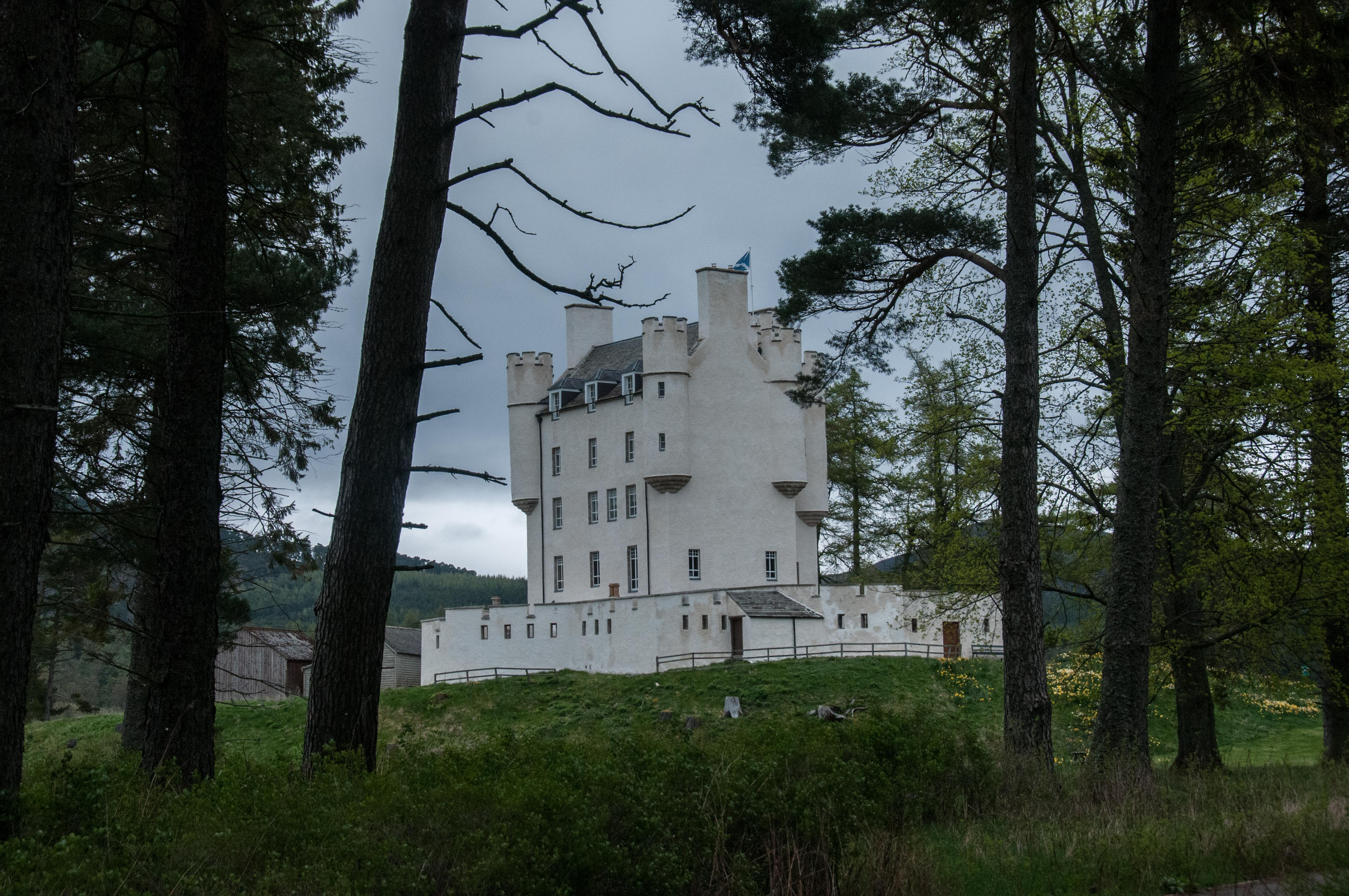
- Braemar Castle in 2024

Site information
- Website: https://www.braemarcastle.co.uk

Location
- Coordinates: 57.0147°N 3.3914°W

Braemar Castle is situated near the village of Braemar in Aberdeenshire, Scotland. It is a possession of the chief of Clan Farquharson and is leased to a local charitable foundation. It is open to the public.

== History ==
From the Late Middle Ages, the castle was a stronghold of the Earls of Mar. The present Braemar Castle was constructed in 1628 by John Erskine, Earl of Mar, as a hunting lodge and to counter the rising power of the Farquharsons, replacing an older building, which was the successor of nearby Kindrochit Castle, which dates from the 11th century AD. The siting of Kindrochit Castle was based upon the strategic location of this site relative to historic crossings of the Grampian Mounth.

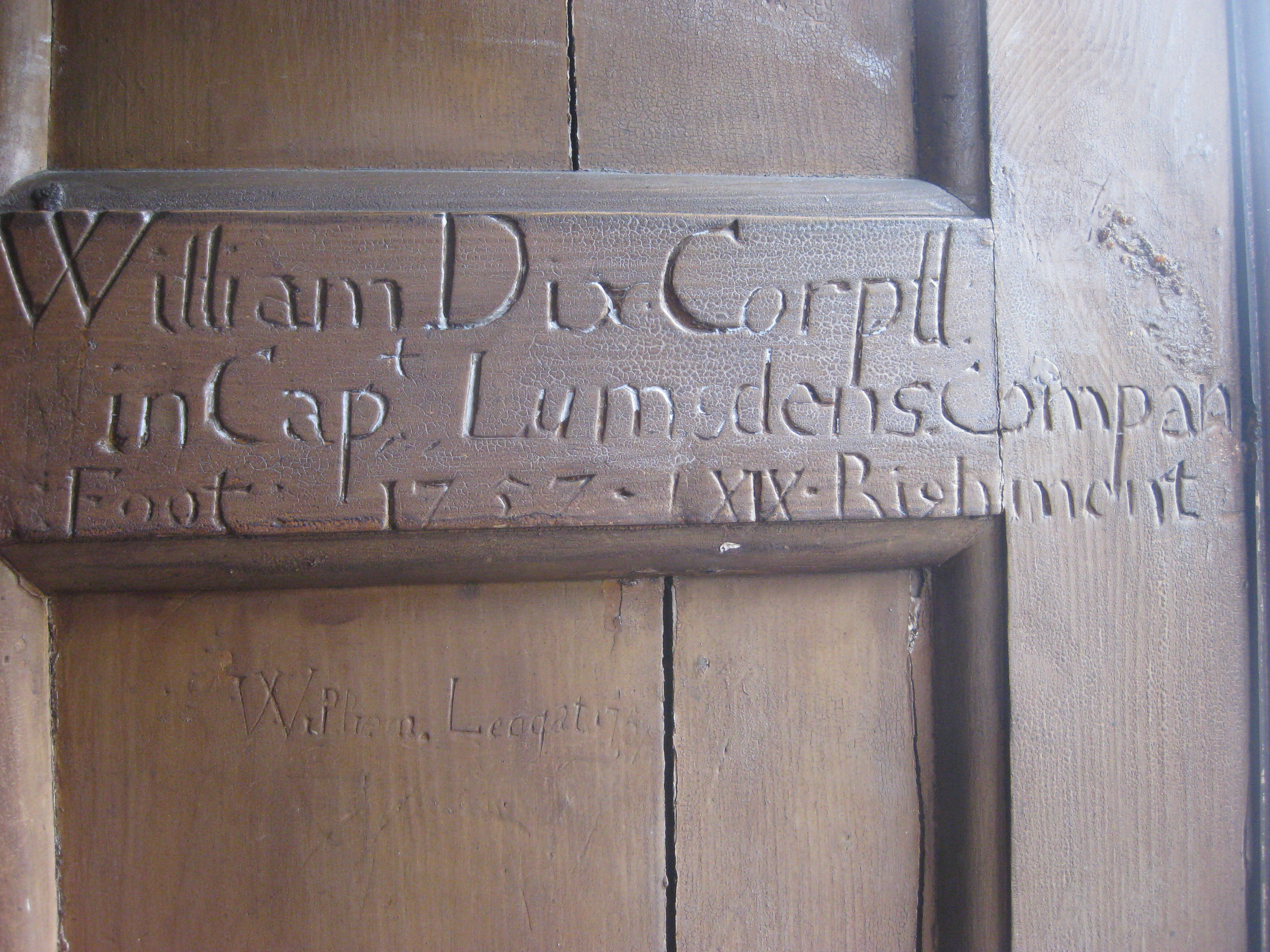
Graffiti in the dining room from soldiers stationed at the castle in the 18th century

An important garrison after the 1745 Jacobite rising, Braemar Castle had been attacked and burned by John Farquharson, the Black Colonel of Inverey during the Jacobite rising of 1689, to prevent it being used as a garrison by Government troops. In 1716 the castle was forfeited to the Crown following the Earl of Mar's leadership of the 1715 Jacobite rising. The castle and lands were purchased by John Farquharson, 9th Laird of Invercauld but the building was left in ruins until 1748 when it was leased to the government at a fee of £14 per year, now to serve as a garrison for Hanoverian troops. From 1760 to 1806 the estate was used largely for commercial woodland, but on a massive scale, with James Farquharson of Invercauld planting 16 million fir trees and 2 million larch during this period.

Rebuilding started under the command of John Adam, Master Mason to the Board of Ordnance.

In 1831 the military garrison was withdrawn and the castle returned to the Farquharson clan. Restoration to provide a family home began under the 12th Laird of Invercauld who entertained Queen Victoria there when she attended the Braemar Gatherings in the grounds of the castle. In 1800 Braemar Castle was documented to have its moat intact.

It has also featured in the video to Andy Stewart's "A Scottish Soldier".

Since 2006 the castle has been leased to the local community. It is run on behalf of the community by local charity, Braemar Community Ltd and staffed by local volunteers, and an ambitious restoration programme has been started. It reopened to the public in 2008.

== Structure ==
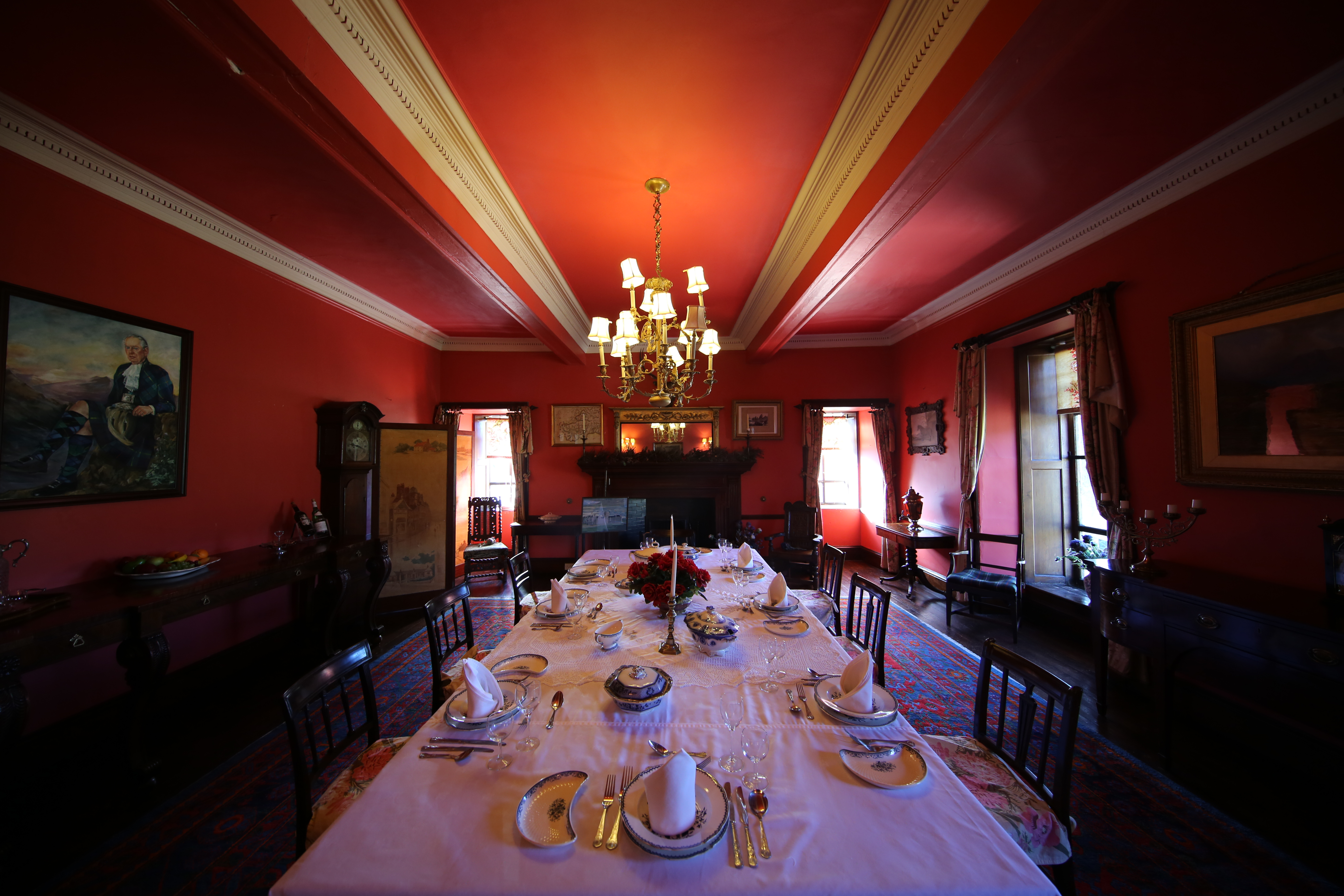
Braemar Castle dining room

The building is a five-storey L-plan castle with a star-shaped curtain wall of six sharp-angled salients, and with three storey angle turrets. The central tower enfolds a round stair tower and is built of granite covered with harl. The main entrance retains an original iron yett, and many of the windows are protected by heavy iron grilles.

On the ground floor are stone-vaulted rooms which contained the guardroom, ammunition store and original kitchen. These are built out into the salients of the outer wall, and in Victorian times a second kitchen was added adjoining the staff rooms. In the floor of a passage, an iron grill provided access to the Laird's Pit, a dark hole used as a dungeon.

On each of the upper floors a large room and a small room occupied the two arms of the tower. On the first floor are the Dining Room and Morning Room, whilst on the floor above is the Laird's Day Room, entered by a curved door. Opposite is the Rose Room, and between the two is a small bathroom installed in 1901. In the main wing at this level is the Drawing Room, containing graffiti incised on the window shutters by government troops. The words "John Chestnut, Sergeant, 1797" can be clearly seen. On the third floor is the Four Poster Bedroom, whilst on the fourth floor lie the Ladies Guest Bedroom, Gentlemans Guest Bedroom and the Principal Bedroom. These upper floors were used by the Farquharson family in the latter years of their visits.

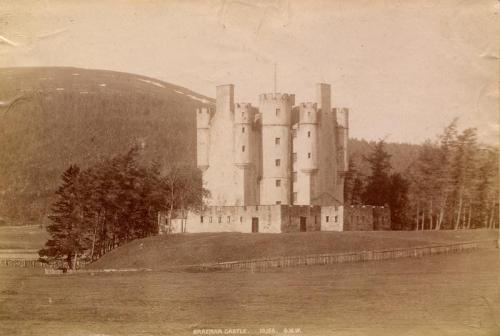
View Of Braemar Castle - photographic print
