= Clan Buchan =

Scottish clan

- Buchanach
- Motto: Non inferior secutus (Following not the inferior)

Profile
- Region: Lowlands
- District: Aberdeenshire

Chief
- The Much Hon. Charles Buchan of Auchmacoy
- Baron of Auchmacoy, Chief of Clan Buchan
- Seat: Auchmacoy House
Allied clans
Clan Farquharson
Clan Comyn

Clan Buchan is a Scottish clan of the Lowlands. The clan are sometimes considered a branch of the Clan Comyn. The Buchan are of no relation to the Clan Buchanan despite their similar name.

== History ==
=== Origins of the Clan ===
The name Buchan is derived from the district of Buchan, in the north east of Aberdeenshire and Banffshire. The ancient Mormaerdom and Earldom of Buchan came into the hands of the Clan Comyn, but they later lost it after they were defeated by Robert the Bruce. The title of Earl of Buchan then went to Alexander Stewart, Earl of Buchan, who was also known as the Wolf of Badenoch. The geographical name of Buchan was used by notable inhabitants of the district even though they may not have had a provable connection to the Earls of Buchan.

The historian, Black, lists one Ricardus de Buchan as a clerk to the bishopric of Aberdeen in 1207. Before 1281 William Buchan held land in Aberdeen. In 1296 Sir Thomas de Boghan appears in the Ragman Rolls giving homage to Edward I of England. Sir Thomas's lands were around Edinburgh, and his seal includes an eight rayed figure which may represent the shining sun, which also forms part of the clan chief's crest.

It is not known definitively when the Buchans gained their lands of Auchmacoy. However, in 1446 Andrew Buchan of Achmakwy was amongst those appointed to settle the boundaries of the lands of St Peter's Hospital. Auchmacoy is believed to have been in the possession of the family from the beginning of the 14th century. However it was not until 1503 when Andrew Buchan, reckoned the second chief of Clan Buchan, received a charter for the lands from James IV of Scotland.

=== 17th century and Civil War ===
The Buchan Barons of Auchmacoy were staunch royalists and supporters of the House of Stuart. Thomas Buchan who was the third son of chief James Buchan of Auchmacoy, was a professional soldier who fought in both France and Holland. He served in Douglas's Scots Regiment that was raised for the king of France. In 1686 he was commissioned as colonel in the Earl of Mar's regiment by James VII of Scotland. He later joined John Graham, 1st Viscount Dundee. After Dundee was killed at the Battle of Killiecrankie in 1689 Buchan was appointed as commander-in-chief of all Jacobite forces in Scotland and received his commission from the king in Ireland. General Buchan harried the enemy with his force of twelve hundred foot soldiers. However, on 1 May 1690 he was surprised and defeated by a strong government force under General Hugh Mackay at the Battle of Cromdale. Buchan however escaped and joined forces with the Clan Farquharson who encouraged him to take the offensive again and they marched from Abergeldie to the Mearns. He was opposed by the Master of Forbes who had a strong force of cavalry, but Buchan dispersed his troops to give the appearance of numerical superiority and Forbes retreated to Aberdeen, causing panic in the city. General Hugh Mackay and his forces then marched to intercept Buchan and as a result the Highlanders under Buchan began to drift away.

=== 18th century and Jacobite risings ===
Thomas Buchan went into exile in France but he later returned to fight at the Battle of Sheriffmuir in 1715. He died in 1721, still in communication with the exiled royals.

=== Modern history ===
James Buchan, fourteenth of Auchmacoy, was recognised as chief of the name by Lord Lyon, King of Arms in April 1830. The title then passed to Louisa, his daughter. The title then passed to her cousin, Sir Norman MacLeod Sinclair, 18th Earl of Caithness. In 1913 he petitioned the Lord Lyon, taking the surname and arms of Buchan of Auchmacoy. The Earl of Caithness's daughter, Lady Lucy Buchan married Sir Thomas Innes of Learney, who was the Lord Lyon in 1928. Their son was Sir Malcolm Innes of Edengight, also Lord Lyon. Lord Caithness's eldest daughter became the seventeenth of Auchmacoy and her son changed his name to Buchan in 1949 to be recognized by the Lord Lyon as chief of Buchans.

Perhaps the most famous Buchan was John Buchan, 1st Baron Tweedsmuir, author of The Thirty-Nine Steps and Governor General of Canada.

Major General Ross Stuart Buchan, AO, was an Australian soldier. In his career, he served as a major on a tour in Vietnam and went on to become the General Officer Commanding Headquarters Training Command. During his Vietnam tour, a close friend, Major Peter Badcoe, was killed and subsequently posthumously awarded the Victoria Cross. The Sydney Morning Herald has a decent article online regarding his career.

Following the passing of David Buchan in 2014, the title passed to his son, Charles Buchan of Auchmacoy, Baron of Auchmacoy, Chief of Clan Buchan.

== Tartan ==
Tartan image	Notes
	Ancient Buchan Tartan

== Septs ==
The clan has no official septs, but the following names have been linked to the Buchan region : Basken/ Baskin, Bede, Buchan/ Bichan/ Bichen, Bonnieville, Boyne, Buck/ Buckie/ Bucky, Cawsell, Chapp, Chrystal, Chrystall, Clapperton, Coscrach/ Costie/ Costy, Cranach/ Crannach, Cruddon/ Cruden/ Crudon, Crystal/ Crystal/ Crystall, Fitchie/ Fitchy, Gammerie/ Gammery, Hardin/ Hardman/ Hardnan, Kermack, Leisk, Mac, Meason/ Merson, Mondie/ Mondy/ Mundie/ Mundy, Nible/ Niblo, Ogston/ Ogstone/ Ogstoun, Prince, Ratcliff/ Ratliff/ Rattcliff/ Rattliff, Runcie/ Runcy, Shakle, Tarves/ Tarvis, Teunion/ Teunon/ Tewnion/ Tinnon, Tucks, Wadsworth/ Wadsworther, West, Whammond/ Whyman/ Whymon, Willgook

== See also ==
- Scottish clan
