= David Erskine, 2nd Lord Cardross =

Scottish noble

David Erskine, 2nd Lord Cardross (baptised 1627 – 1671) was a Scottish Royalist.

== Life ==
Erskine was the only son of Henry Erskine, second son of the second marriage of John Erskine, Earl of Mar, and heir to the Barony of Cardross, by his wife Margaret, only daughter of Sir James Bellenden of Broughton, near Edinburgh. On the death of his grandfather in December 1634 he became vested in the title of Cardross, and was served heir to his father in the barony, 17 March 1636–7.

He was one of the few peers who protested against the delivering up of Charles I to the English army at Newcastle in 1646, and was a promoter of the "engagement" in 1648, for which he was fined £1,000, and debarred from sitting in parliament in 1649.

== Family ==
Cardross was married twice. In 1645 he married, Anne, fifth daughter of Sir Thomas Hope of Craighall, by whom he had Henry Erskine, 3rd Lord Cardross and a daughter, Margaret, who married William Cunningham of Boquhan. In 1655, he married Mary, youngest daughter of Sir George Bruce of Carnock, Fifeshire, and had several issue, including William of Torry.

He died in 1671.
