= Anne Leith =

Scottish woman (fl. 1740s) who helped Jacobite soldiers during the Battle of Culloden

- Born: Aberdeenshire
- Other name: "The Grand Rebel"

Anne Leith (fl. 1740s) was a young widow from Aberdeenshire who helped Jacobite soldiers during the Battle of Culloden. Whilst Leith was in Inverness, she heard news of the Jacobite's defeat during the battle, bringing food and medical supplies to the soldiers that same afternoon. Once the soldiers were taken as prisoners of war, Leith continued to visit them and demand fair treatment on their behalf until they were taken away from Inverness three months later.

== Assisting the soldiers ==
During the autumn of 1745, Anne Leith became stranded in Inverness due to the ongoing troubles of the Jacobite rising of 1745. She remained there still on 16 April 1746, when the Jacobites were defeated at Culloden. Although the battle was over, it was very risky entering the battlefield, but this did not stop Leith, her friend Mrs Stonor, and lady's maid Eppy from doing so. Despite the risk, Leith and her companions went to Drumossie Moor and aided the soldiers however they could, with fresh bandages and other necessities. Anne Leith's persistent efforts aiding the wounded earned her the title "the Grand Rebel". Her friends and family objected to the title she had been given, but Leith's response to their attitude was to call them "chicken-hearted".

== Consequences of her rebellion ==
Anne Leith's rebellious attitudes towards the invading force was brought to the attention of Captain Eyre, who was notorious for his cruelty towards the Jacobite prisoners of war. She was brought into custody at bayonet-point, although was released quickly after her entreaties that she was a widow who was visiting relatives who were prisoners of war.

She was subsequently arrested three further times, although was only ever detained for a few hours. Even after months of providing assistance to the soldiers, Leith continued to write to them once they had left Inverness, providing support and kindness despite the risk to herself.
