= Invercauld Castle =

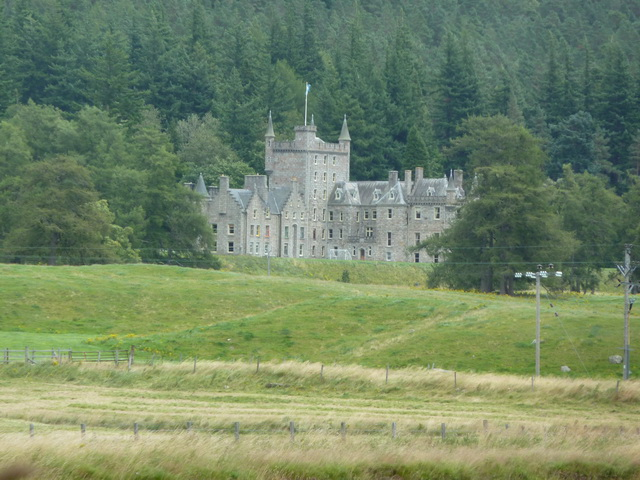
- Invercauld Castle in 2012

- Location of Invercauld Castle in Aberdeenshire
- 57.0155°N 3.3618°W
- Location: Near Braemar, Aberdeenshire, Scotland

History
- Built: 16th century, remodelled 1875
- Built for: Clan Farquharson

Site notes
- Architect: John Thomas Wimperis (1875)

Listed Building – Category A
- Official name: Invercauld House
- Designated: 24 November 1972
- Reference no.: LB2995

Inventory of Gardens and Designed Landscapes in Scotland
- Official name: Invercauld
- Criteria: Historical; Scenic
- Designated: 1 July 1987
- Reference no.: GDL00224

Invercauld Castle (/ˌɪnvərˈkɔːld/) is a country house situated in Royal Deeside near Braemar in Scotland. It is protected as a category A listed building, and the grounds are included in the Inventory of Gardens and Designed Landscapes in Scotland.

== History ==
The Farquharson family settled in the area in the 14th century, and constructed a tower house in the 16th century. A vaulted basement within the present building dates from this time, although the tower house was remodelled in the late 17th century. Further alterations were made through the 18th and 19th centuries, and in 1875 the castle was extensively remodelled by John Thomas Wimperis in the Scots Baronial style. The house retains many Victorian furnishings and paintings.

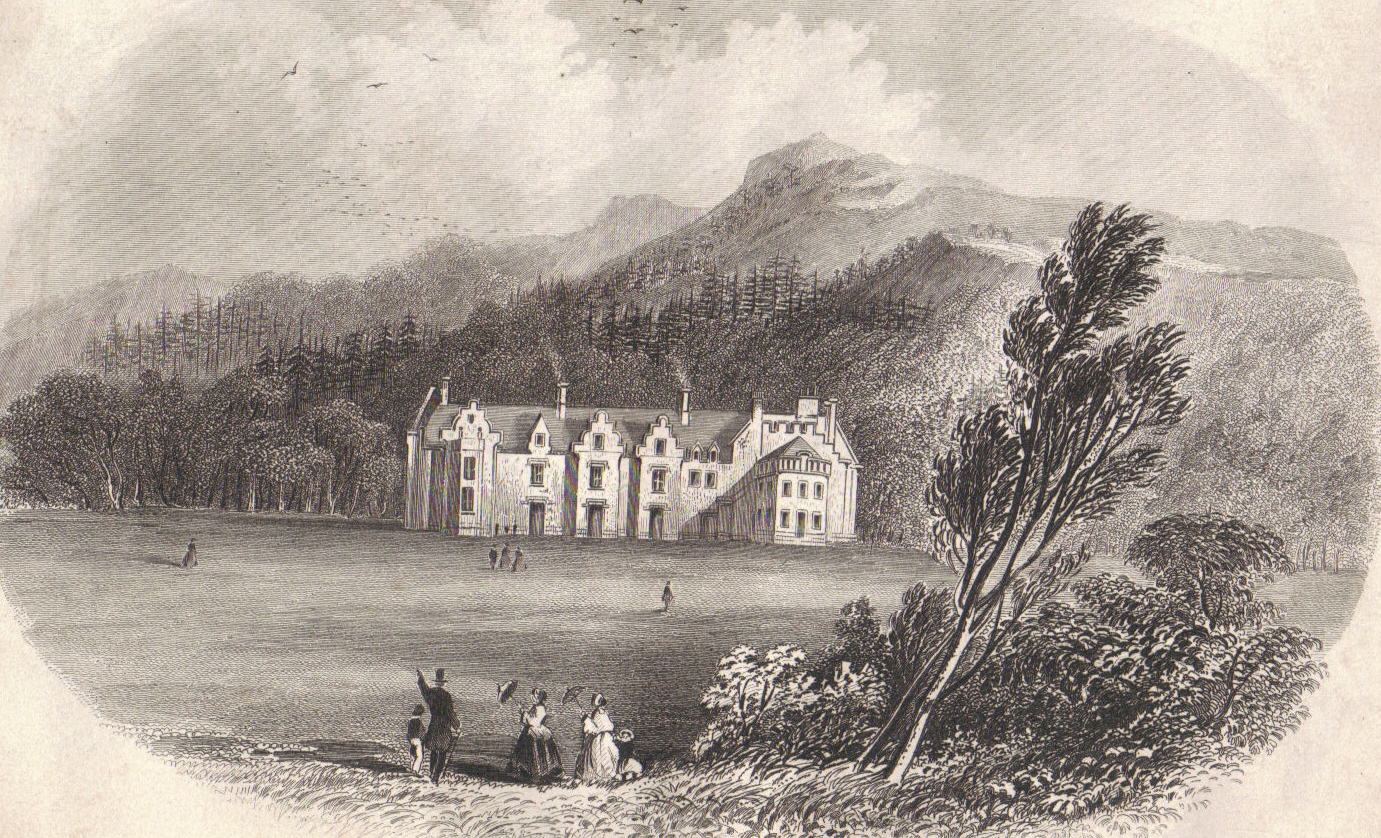
The castle in the early 1800s prior to extensive alterations
