= Holt Heath, Worcestershire =

Village in Worcestershire, England

Coordinates: 52.26485°N 2.27103°W

Holt Heath
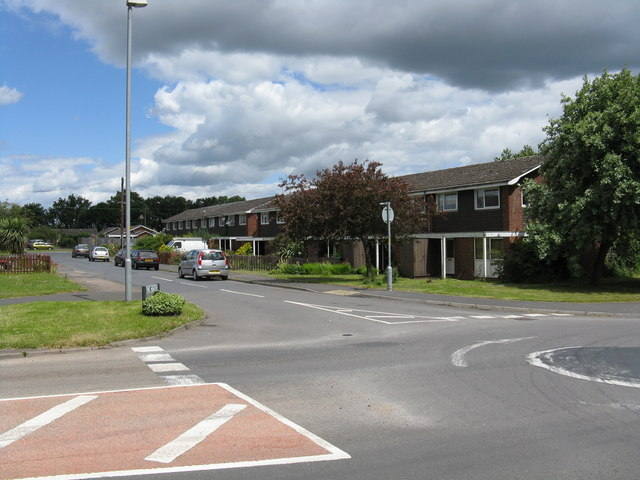

- Location within Worcestershire
- OS grid reference: SO816630
- District: Malvern Hills
- Shire county: Worcestershire
- Region: West Midlands
- Country: England
- Sovereign state: United Kingdom
- Post town: WORCESTER
- Postcode district: WR6
- Dialling code: 01905
- Police: West Mercia
- Fire: Hereford and Worcester
- Ambulance: West Midlands

Holt Heath, in the parish of Holt, is a village near the west bank of the River Severn in Worcestershire.

The nearest towns are all about 6 miles away: to the north Stourport-on-Severn, to the east Droitwich Spa and to the south Worcester.

There is a post office in the centre of the village. Outside Holt Heath is a castle and parish church. There are three schools nearby: Grimley and Holt, Great Witley and Hallow.

Holt Heath is also known for its public houses, The Red Lion and The Wharf Inn.

== See also ==
- Holt Bridge
- Holt Fleet
- Grimley, Worcestershire
