= John Erskine, Earl of Mar (1558–1634) =

Scottish politician (died 1634)

The Right Honourable John Erskine
- Earl of Mar
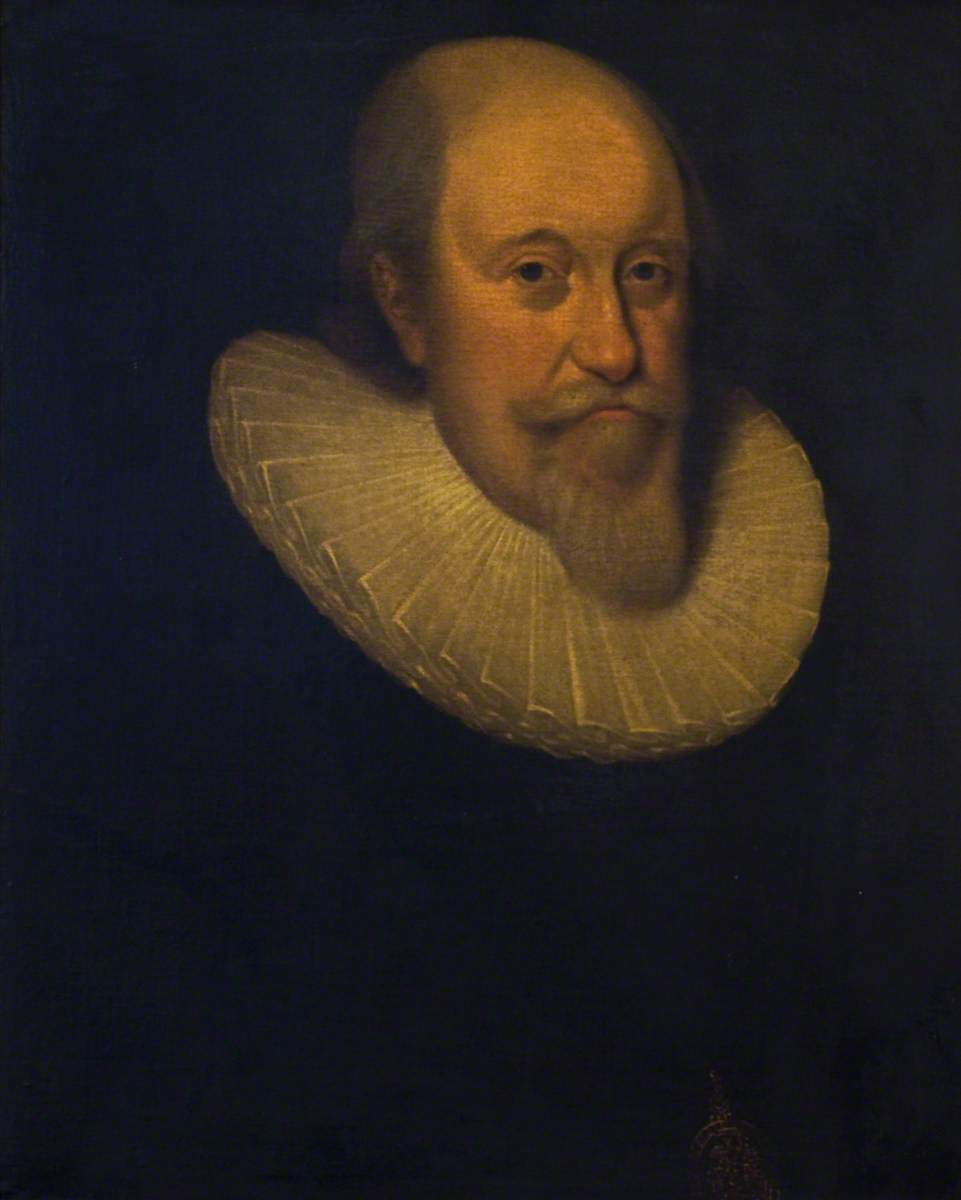
- The Earl depicted in an oil painting. (c. 17th century)
- Born: c. 1558; Stirling Castle, Stirlingshire, Kingdom of Scotland
- Died: 14 December 1634 (aged 75–76); Stirling, Stirlingshire, Kingdom of Scotland
- Spouse: Marie Stewart
- Issue: at least 13
- Parents: John Erskine, 1st Earl of Mar; Annabella Murray

John Erskine, 2nd Earl of Mar (c. 1558 – 14 December 1634) was a Scottish politician and nobleman, the only son of John Erskine, 1st Earl of Mar and Annabella Murray. He is regarded as both the 19th earl (in the 1st creation) and the 2nd earl (in the 7th).

== History ==
John Erskine was born in 1558, though the precise date is unknown. Together with King James VI of Scotland he was educated by George Buchanan. He succeeded to the earldom of Mar on the death of his father in 1572. After attaining his majority he was nominally the guardian of the young king, who was about seven years his junior, and who lived with him at Stirling; but he was in reality something of a puppet in the hands of the regent, James Douglas, 4th Earl of Morton; and he lost power and position when Morton was imprisoned.

He married his first wife, Anne Drummond (1555–1587) in October 1580 at Kincardine Castle near Auchterarder. The wedding guests included James VI but not his the favourite Esmé Stewart, 1st Duke of Lennox. Anne was the daughter of Lord David Drummond (d. 1571) and Lilias Ruthven (d. 1579). Their marriage was cut short by Anne's early death in 1587, but the marriage did produce John's son and heir, John Erskine.

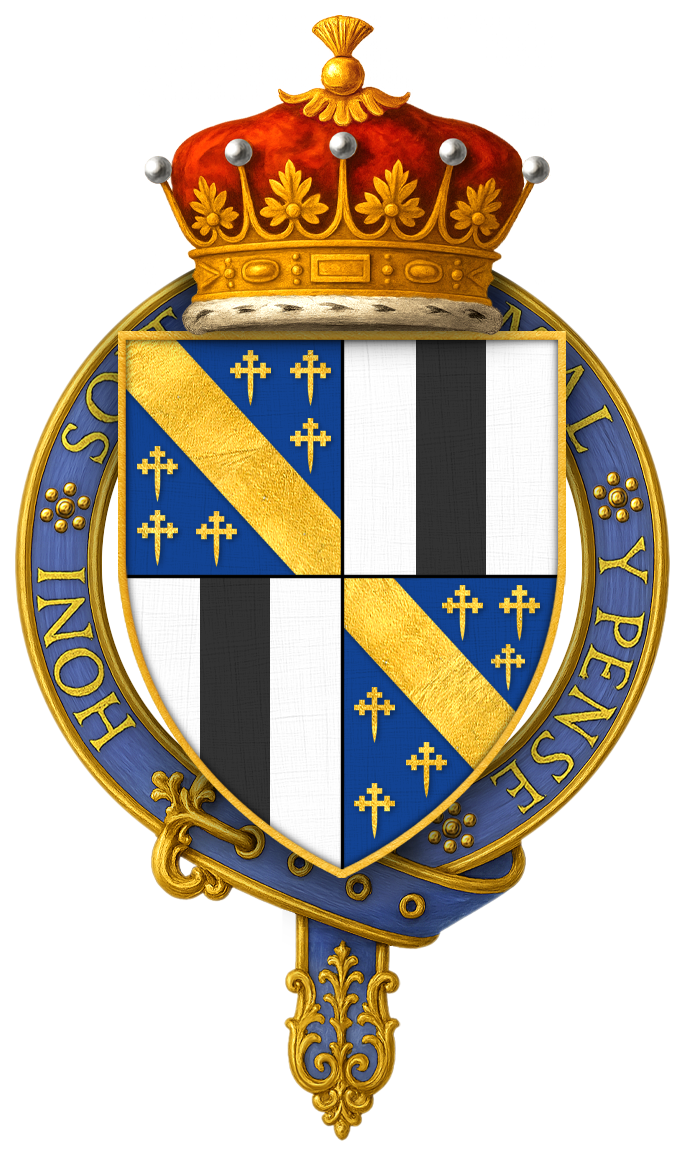
Arms of John Erskine, Earl of Mar

He was concerned in the seizure of James VI in 1582 (a plot known as the Raid of Ruthven); but when James escaped from his new custodians the earl fled into the west of Scotland. Then leaving his hiding-place the Earl of Mar seized Stirling Castle, whereupon James marched against him, and he took refuge in England. Queen Elizabeth I interceded for him, but in vain.

In October 1584 James VI gave a gift of Mar's clothes to Thomas Stewart, a brother of Alexander Stewart of Garlies. The clothes included cloaks, doublets, breeches, and other items in cloth-of-silver, figured velvet, satin and other rich fabrics. They had been seized from a ship than ran aground near Whithorn. Mar made an unusual arrangement with his Edinburgh tailor John Murdo and his wife Mause Balgaskry, giving them an income in teinds of cereal crops in exchange for making his clothes with further payment.

After some futile communications between the governments of England and Scotland in 1585 the Earl of Mar and his friends gathered an army, entered the presence of the king at Stirling, and were soon in supreme authority. The Earl of Mar was restored to his lands and titles. Henceforward he stood high in the royal favour, becoming governor of Edinburgh Castle and then tutor to James's son, Prince Henry. His great achievement was the recovery of the Mar estates, alienated by the Crown during the long period that his family had been out of possession, including Kildrummy, the seat of the earldom.

In May 1592 he met James VI at Fenton Tower in East Lothian, the new home of the Captain of the Guard Sir John Carmichael, to discuss the keepership of Edinburgh Castle following the death of Sir James Home. The office had also been offered to the Duke of Lennox but Home had requested it go to Mar.

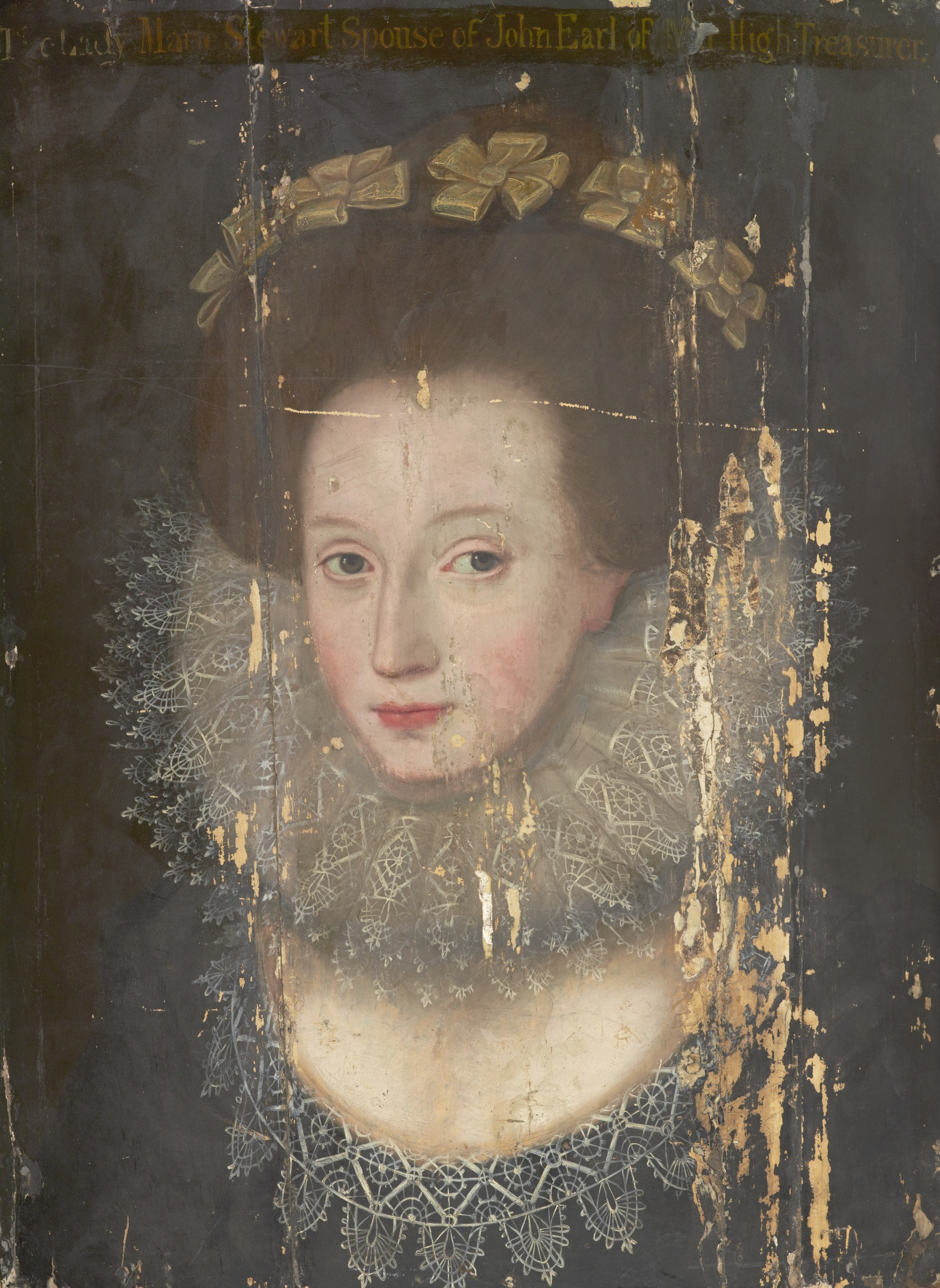
Marie Stewart, Countess of Mar (died 1644), second wife of the Earl of Mar

In December 1592 he married his second wife Marie Stewart, daughter of Esmé Stewart, 1st Duke of Lennox at Holyroodhouse. The marriage was intended to be held at Dalkeith Palace but was delayed by Mar's illness, the match was opposed by many because Mary was a Catholic. Their daughter, Lady Mary Erskine, married William Keith, 5th Earl Marischal.

=== Prince Henry at Stirling ===
On 21 February 1594 Mar was appointed Keeper and Governor of the heir apparent, Prince Henry, who was to stay at Stirling Castle. Mar performed in the tournament at the baptism of Prince Henry dressed as a "Christian Knight" in a team with the king and Sir Thomas Erskine. Elizabeth I contributed to the costs of the Prince's household, James VI assigned £5000 Scots to Mar in 1595 from the English subsidy or annuity.

On 11 September 1594, James wrote to Mar asking him to form a commission to reform crown finance. Mar's custody of the Prince at Stirling led to disagreement with Anne of Denmark. James VI wrote a note to Mar in June 1595 instructing him, in the event his death, not to deliver Henry to Anne of Denmark or the Parliament of Scotland until he was 18 and gave the order himself. Over several days at Linlithgow Palace in June 1595, James VI and Anne had discussions about the keeping of their son Prince Henry by Mar, but Anne refused to talk to Mar when he came to Linlithgow. In September 1595 the queen would not look at Mar when he was in the same room with her at Falkland Palace.

=== Diplomacy with England ===
Mar kept up a correspondence with the Earl of Essex and in December 1595 mentioned to Essex he had heard a rumour that David Foulis carried a message "to his disgrace", damaging to Mar's reputation. In 1596 Queen Elizabeth, via the Earl of Essex and his secretary Anthony Bacon, sent her miniature portrait by Nicholas Hilliard to Prince Henry, and this was received by Mar at Stirling.

In 1601, the earl was sent as envoy to London; here Elizabeth I assured him that James should be her successor, and his mission was conducted with tact and prudence. After the embassy the sum paid as a subsidy to James VI was increased, by the persuasion of Sir Robert Cecil. Elizabeth gave him a silver basin and laver set with mother-of-pearl and rubies.

Mar was involved in the "secret correspondence of James VI", an initiative to help put James on the throne of England. Mar and other members of a select group kept up a dialogue with English diplomats.

=== Union of the Crowns ===
In 1603 Elizabeth I died and James VI became king of England, the event known as the Union of the Crowns which Mar had hoped for. James travelled to England. Mar remained at Stirling Castle in charge of Prince Henry. While he was away from Stirling on business connected with death of his mother, on 7 May 1603 Anne of Denmark came to take away Prince Henry. The Countess, his wife Marie Stewart, and his son Lord Erskine refused to allow this. Anne of Denmark had a miscarriage at the castle. According to the lawyer Thomas Hamilton, she told Lady Paisley and her physician Martin Schöner that she had taken "balm water". There were suggestions that this miscarriage or abortion was self-induced, perhaps by use of the "balm water".

While Anne of Denmark was recovering, Mar returned to Stirling and made his apology for the events to members of the Scottish Privy Council who had assembled at the castle. He told them he had heard of a plot to take Prince Henry away from the castle during his absence. A letter from Mar to Cecil on 20 May expressed his hopes that the king thought his "young son and honest poor friends have done nothing but served him faithfully".

The Earl of Montrose, Lord Chancellor of Scotland, made efforts to calm the controversy and help set Anne of Denmark on her way to England in June. One difficulty was a previous command of James that Mar should convey the Prince to England in the Queen's company. Anne refused to travel with Mar. He returned to the king at London before Anne started her journey.

Mar had also alleged that he had heard of a plot to take Prince Henry from Stirling while he was absent in May. In a letter to Anne of Denmark, King James emphasised that Mar had not made counter-accusations against her suggesting the events at Stirling were part of a wider plot, a supposed "Spanish course". James wrote that Anne should share his confidence in Mar, and obey his instructions "whether ye were a king's or a cook's daughter". Mar apologised to Anne of Denmark on 5 July at Windsor Castle. King James reconciled Mar and his wife after their coronation, but French diplomats noted that her resentment over the affront at Stirling continued.

The French ambassador, the Marquis de Rosny, identified Mar as an influential courtier and member of a Scottish bedchamber faction. Rosny gave Mar a hatbadge or enseigne in the form of a bouquet of flowers set with diamonds, rubies and other stones. Mar joined the English privy council. He was granted several manors in England, including Hundon and Chipley in Suffolk, for which he was given £15,000 in 1611 when they were sold to William, Lord Cavendish.

In November 1603 the Spanish ambassador, the Count of Villamediana, invited the Duke of Lennox and the Earl of Mar to dinner, and according to Arbella Stuart asked them "to bring the Scottish ladies, for he was desirous to see some natural beauties." These included Jean Drummond and Anne Hay, with Elizabeth Carey.

In September 1606, Mar was with the court at Beaulieu Abbey but fell ill with a burning fever. For fear of contagion, he was taken to Southampton where he recovered. In January 1608, Henry Howard, 1st Earl of Northampton, formerly one of the "secret correspondents", wrote to Mar asking for the recipe that would restore his favour with Anne of Denmark. In April 1608, Mar was summoned to court in London. He made a will making Marie Countess of Mar his executor, leaving her a jewel bought from William Herrick, and reserving to his eldest son by his first wife important items including the silver basin set with mother-of-pearl which had been a gift from Queen Elizabeth, and a jewel given to him by the King of France.

The Earl of Mar was created Lord Cardross in 1610; he was a member of the Court of High Commission and was Lord High Treasurer of Scotland from 1615 to 1630.

In September 1612 Mar asked King James if the Laird of Findlater could be made a Baron. The King wrote that there were too many Scottish noblemen already, which caused discontent in England, and was prejudicial to the Union. On 5 April 1616, Mar attended a meeting at Whitehall Palace to discuss proposals for Prince Charles to marry a French princess.

Mar's sons went on a Grand Tour in France in 1616 with their tutor John Schaw. James Hudson wrote to the Earl of Mar in September 1616 mentioning that Sergeant Bowie had met them and they were well.

King James came to Scotland in 1617 and during his return journey he wrote to Mar on 16 August from Hoghton Tower asking him to send a couple of terriers or earth dogs for fox hunting. In 1620 Mar, as treasurer, was to pay the expenses of the king's falconer travelling to Orkney and Shetland for hawks. In 1621 King James requested fir tree seeds for the Marquis of Buckingham to plant at Burley on the Hill.

The depute-treasurer Gideon Murray died in 1621, and Mar wrote to King James in July assuring him that Murray's good management would continue, and that he himself had visited Linlithgow Palace to see the new north range being built.

Mar died at Stirling on 14 December 1634. He was buried at Alloa on 7 April 1635.

A portrait of Mar by Adam de Colone of 1626 gives his age as 64 years. The painter used a fine but old linen tablecloth as a support rather than canvas.

== Mar and the King's Jewels ==
From time to time James would lodge jewels with Mar for safety and as pledges for loans. In December 1601 Mar returned several pieces including a cross set with seven diamonds and two rubies, a hat string with 89 diamonds, a "feather" jewel to wear in a hat in the shape of a capital letter "A" for Anne of Denmark made with 110 diamonds, and other pieces. These jewels seem to have pledged for a loan in London. The diplomat David Foulis wrote to Mar from London in December 1601 that the jewels were "delivered in their full integrity".

== Gardens of Stirling Castle ==
King Charles sent a warrant in June 1625 for Mar and Archibald Napier, treasurer-depute, to appoint a "skillfull and well experimented gardener in England" to reside at Stirling Castle and repair the orchards. William Watts was appointed. In 1629 fruit trees for the gardens at Stirling were shipped from London in the Unicorn of Kirkcaldy to Alloa and delivered to Mar's gardener there, David Erskine.

== Marriages and family ==
John Erskine and Anne Drummond had a son:

- John (c. 1585–1654), who succeeded to his earldom.

John Erskine and his second wife, Marie Stewart, had five sons, including:

- James Erskine (died 1640)
- Henry Erskine, Master of Cardross and Commendator of Dryburgh (died 1628), whose son David Erskine succeeded to the barony of Cardross
- Charles Erskine, ancestor of the earls of Rosslyn
- Alexander Erskine, in 1626 his father wrote to Elizabeth Stuart, Queen of Bohemia declining a plan for his marriage.

One of Mar's sons was baptised at Stirling on 20 July 1595 with James VI as a godparent.

In November 1614 Viscount Fenton discussed the marriage of Mar's second daughter Anna Erskine to a son of the Earl of Rothes, later John Leslie, 6th Earl of Rothes. Although Rothes was an ancient and noble house, Fenton would not have advised that Mar's eldest son's should marry a daughter of Katherine Drummond, the "last Lady Rothes that was".

Peerage of Scotland
Preceded by John Erskine	Earl of Mar; 1572–1634	Succeeded by John Erskine
