= Lord Cardross =

Lord Cardross is a title in the Peerage of Scotland, since 1695 a subsidiary title of the earldom of Buchan. It was created in 1606 for John Erskine, Earl of Mar, with remainder to his heirs male and assignees whatsoever and with the power to nominate his successor. In 1617 he nominated his second son by his second wife Marie Stewart, Henry Erskine, Master of Cardross, to be his successor in the lordship of Cardross. The Earl of Mar died in 1634 and was succeeded in the earldom of Mar by his son by his first wife, John, and in the lordship of Cardross by his grandson David Erskine, the second Lord Cardross, the son of Henry, Master of Cardross, who had died in 1628. The second Lord was a supporter of The Engagement and was barred from sitting in Parliament in 1649. He was succeeded by his eldest son, the third Lord. He emigrated to North America to escape religious persecution and established a colony in what is now Carolina. His son, the fourth Lord, succeeded his kinsman in the earldom of Buchan in 1695. However, it was not until 1698 that his claim was established by the Scottish Parliament. For further history of the title, see Earl of Buchan.

Several other members of this branch of the Erskine family have also gained distinction. John Erskine of Cardross, younger son of the second Lord, was a soldier and politician. John Erskine of Carnock, son of John Erskine of Cardross, was a noted jurist. John Erskine, leader of the Evangelical Party in the 18th century Scottish Church, was the son of John Erskine of Carnock by his first wife. John Elphinstone Erskine, grandson of James Erskine, son of James Erskine of Carnock by his second wife, was an admiral in the Royal Navy. Sir David Erskine, son of James Erskine, brother of John Elphinstone Erskine, was Serjeant at Arms of the British House of Commons between 1885 and 1915 and held several positions at the British court. James Francis Erskine (1862–1936), eldest son of Sir David Erskine, was a brigadier-general in the Scots Guards. His son Malcolm David Erskine (1903–1949), was a brigadier in the Scots Guards. Seymour Elphinstone Erskine (1863–1945), second son of Sir David Erskine, was an admiral in the Royal Navy. Walter Hugh Erskine (1870–1948), third son of Sir David Erskine, was Deputy Serjeant at Arms of the British House of Commons between 1929 and 1940. Ian David Erskine (1898–1973), son of Alan David Erskine, fourth son of Sir David Erskine, was a major-general in the British Army. Sir Arthur Erskine, fifth son of Sir David Erskine, was a soldier and courtier. Sir James Elphinstone Erskine, brother of Sir David Erskine, was an admiral of the fleet. George Elphinstone Erskine (1841–1912), son of George Keith Erskine, brother of John Elphinstone Erskine, was a major-general in the Bombay Cavalry in the Indian Army. His son by his second wife, Sir George Erskine, was a general in the British Army.

== Lords Cardross (1606) ==
- John Erskine, Earl of Mar, 1st Lord Cardross (1562–1634)
  - Henry Erskine, Master of Cardross (d. 1628)
- David Erskine, 2nd Lord Cardross (1627–1671)
- Henry Erskine, 3rd Lord Cardross ( 1650–1693)
- David Erskine, 4th Lord Cardross (1672–1745) (succeeded as Earl of Buchan in 1695)

see Earl of Buchan for further succession

== Family tree ==
Family tree of the Earls of Buchan, Earls of Traquair and Barons Erskine

James Stewart c. 1399–c. 1451 "the Black Knight of Lorn"	Joan Beaufort c. 1404–1445; Queen of Scots	James I 1394–1437; King of Scots
Earl of Atholl (8th creation), 1457	Earl of Buchan (3rd creation) and Lord Auchterhouse, 1469
John Stewart c. 1437–1442–1513; 1st Earl of Atholl	James Stewart; 1442–1499; 1st Earl of Buchan, Lord Auchterhouse
Stewarts of Traquair
Alexander Stewart d. 1505; 2nd Earl of Buchan	John Stewart; 1489–1513; 1st of Traquair
John Stewart; 1498–1551; 3rd Earl of Buchan	William Stewart d. 1538; 2nd of Traquair
John Stewart d. 1547; Master of Buchan	Robert Stewart d. 1548; 3rd of Traquair	Sir; John Stewart d. 1591; 4th of Traquair	Sir; William Stewart d. 1605; 5th of Traquair	James Stewart d. 1606; 6th of Traquair
Christina Stewart c. 1548–1580; 4th Countess of Buchan, suo jure	Robert Douglas d. 1580; 4th Earl of Buchan, jure uxoris	John Stewart d. 1606; Younger of Traquair
Lord Stewart of Traquair, 1628; Earl of Traquair and Lord Linton and Caberston
John Douglas d. 1547; 5th Earl of Buchan	John Erskine c. 1558–1634; 19th/2nd Earl of Mar	John Stewart; 1600–1659; 1st Earl of Traquair, Lord Stewart of Traquair, and Lord Linton and Caberston
Mary Douglas d. 1628; 6th Countess of Buchan, suo jure	James Erskine d. 1640; 6th Earl of Buchan, jure uxoris	Henry Erskine; 1672–1745; 1st Lord (Master of) Cardross	John Stewart; 1623–1666; 2nd Earl of Traquair, Lord Stewart of Traquair, and Lord Linton and Caberston
James Erskine d. 1664; 7th Earl of Buchan	David Erskine; 1626–1671; 2nd Lord Cardross	William Stewart; 1657–1673; 3rd Earl of Traquair, Lord Stewart of Traquair, and Lord Linton and Caberston	Charles Stewart; 1659–1741; 4th Earl of Traquair, Lord Stewart of Traquair, and Lord Linton and Caberston
William Erskine d. 1695; 8th Earl of Buchan	Henry Erskine; 1650–1693; 3rd Lord Cardross	Charles Stewart; 1697–1764; 5th Earl of Traquair, Lord Stewart of Traquair, and Lord Linton and Caberston	John Stewart; 1698–1779; 6th Earl of Traquair, Lord Stewart of Traquair, and Lord Linton and Caberston
David Erskine; 1672–1745; 9th Earl of Buchan, 4th Lord Cardross	Charles Stewart; 1746–1827; 7th Earl of Traquair, Lord Stewart of Traquair, and Lord Linton and Caberston
Henry Erskine; 1710–1767; 10th Earl of Buchan, 5th Lord Cardross	Charles Stewart; 1781–1861; 8th Earl of Traquair, Lord Stewart of Traquair, and Lord Linton and Caberston
Earldom of Traquair, Lordship Stewart of Traquair, and Lordship Linton and Caberston extinct, 1861
Baron Erskine of Restormel Castle in the County of Cornwall, 1806
David Erskine; 1742–1829; 11th Earl of Buchan, 6th Lord Cardross	Henry Erskine; 1746–1817	Thomas Erskine; 1750–1823; 1st Baron Erskine
David Erskine	Henry Erskine; 1783–1857; 12th Earl of Buchan, 7th Lord Cardross	David Montagu Erskine; 1776–1855; 2nd Baron Erskine
David Erskine; 1815–1899; 13th Earl of Buchan, 8th Lord Cardross	Thomas Americus Erskine; 1802–1877; 3rd Baron Erskine	John Cadwalader Erskine; 1804–1882; 4th Baron Erskine
Shipley Gordon Stuart Erskine; 1850–1934; 14th Earl of Buchan, 9th Lord Cardross	William Macnagthen Erskine; 1841–1913; 5th Baron Erskine
Ronald Douglas Stewart Mar; 1878–1960; 15th Earl of Buchan, 10th Lord Cardross	Montagu Erskine; 1865–1957; 6th Baron Erskine
Donald Cardross Flower Erskine; 1899–1984; 16th Earl of Buchan, 11th Lord Cardross, 7th Baron Erskine
Malcom Henry Erskine; 1930–2022; 17th Earl of Buchan, 12th Lord Cardross, 8th Baron Erskine
Henry Thomas Alexander Erskine b. 1960; 18th Earl of Buchan, 13th Lord Cardross, 9th Baron Erskine
Alexander Erskine b. 1990; Lord Cardross
