= Baron Erskine =

Barony in the Peerage of the United Kingdom

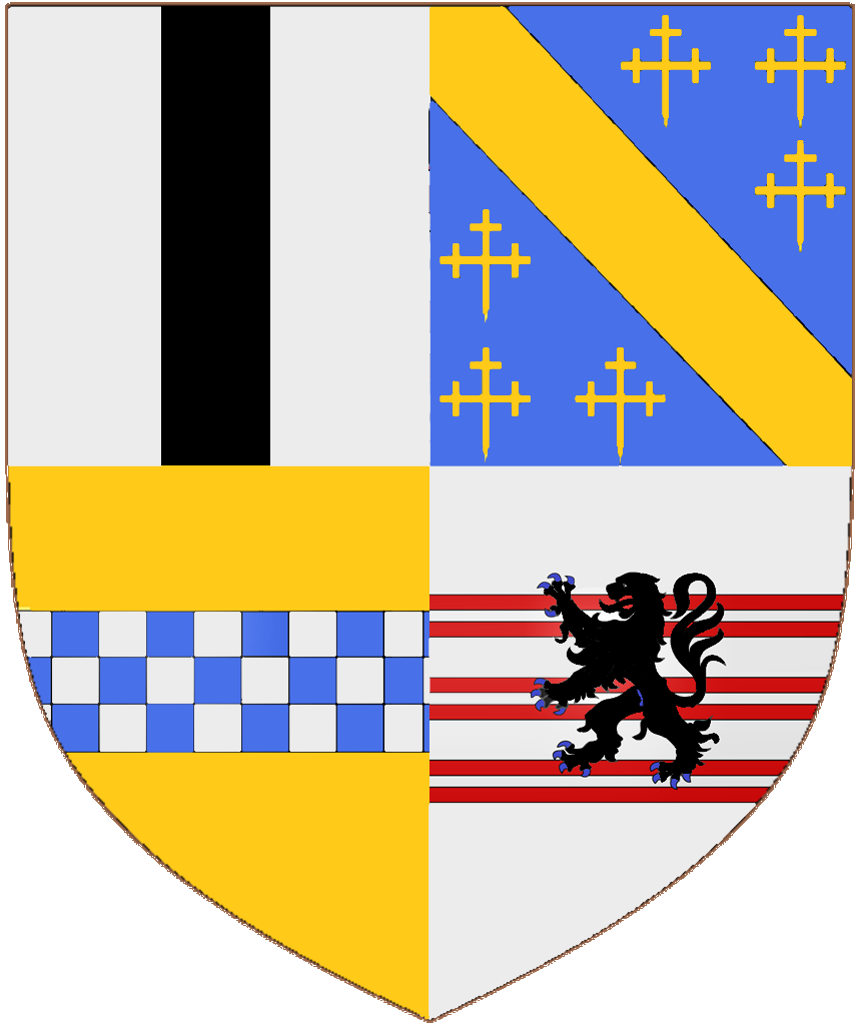
The arms of the Barons Erskine

Baron Erskine, of Restormel Castle in the County of Cornwall, is a title in the Peerage of the United Kingdom, since 1960 a subsidiary title of the earldom of Buchan. It was created on 10 February 1806 for the Honourable Thomas Erskine on his appointment as Lord High Chancellor of Great Britain, a post he held until the following year. He was the third and youngest son of Henry Erskine, 10th Earl of Buchan (see Earl of Buchan for earlier history of the family). Lord Erskine was succeeded by his eldest son, the second Baron. He was a diplomat. His two eldest sons, the third and fourth Barons, succeeded successively. The latter was succeeded by his son, the fifth Baron. He was a Deputy Lieutenant of Northamptonshire. His grandson, the seventh Baron, succeeded in the earldom of Buchan in 1960 on the death of his kinsman, the fifteenth Earl. The two titles have remained united since.

Several other members of this branch of the Erskine family may also be mentioned. The Very Reverend the Honourable Henry David Erskine (1786–1859), second son of the first Baron, was Dean of Ripon. The Honourable Thomas Erskine (1788–1870), third son of the first Baron, was a Judge of the Court of Common Pleas. The Honourable Esmé Stuart Erskine (1789–1817), fought at the Battle of Waterloo where he lost an arm. The Honourable Edward Erskine, fourth son of the second Baron, was a diplomat and served as Envoy Extraordinary and Minister Plenipotentiary to Greece and to Sweden. James Stuart Erskine (1821–1904), fifth son of the second Baron, was created Freiherr Erskine by Ludwig II of Bavaria.

== Barons Erskine (1806) ==
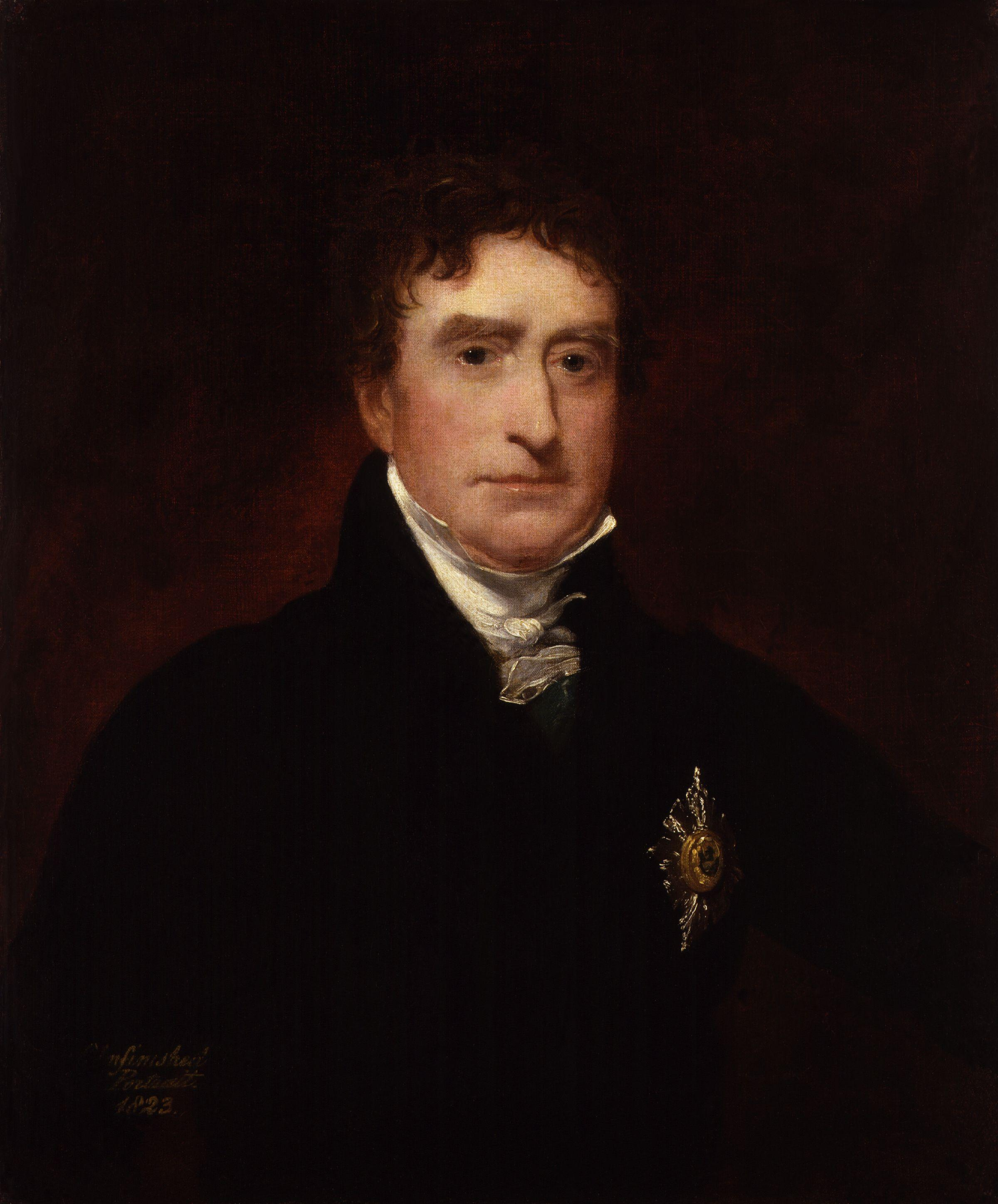
Thomas Erskine, 1st Baron Erskine.

- Thomas Erskine, 1st Baron Erskine (1749/50–1823)
- David Montagu Erskine, 2nd Baron Erskine (1777–1855)
- Thomas Americus Erskine, 3rd Baron Erskine (1802–1877)
- John Cadwallader Erskine, 4th Baron Erskine (1804–1882)
- William Macnaghten Erskine, 5th Baron Erskine (1841–1913)
- Montagu Erskine, 6th Baron Erskine (1865–1957)
- Donald Cardross Flower Erskine, 16th Earl of Buchan, 7th Baron Erskine (1899–1984)

For further Barons Erskine, see Earl of Buchan.

== Family tree ==
Family tree of the Earls of Buchan, Earls of Traquair and Barons Erskine

James Stewart c. 1399–c. 1451 "the Black Knight of Lorn"	Joan Beaufort c. 1404–1445; Queen of Scots	James I 1394–1437; King of Scots
Earl of Atholl (8th creation), 1457	Earl of Buchan (3rd creation) and Lord Auchterhouse, 1469
John Stewart c. 1437–1442–1513; 1st Earl of Atholl	James Stewart; 1442–1499; 1st Earl of Buchan, Lord Auchterhouse
Stewarts of Traquair
Alexander Stewart d. 1505; 2nd Earl of Buchan	John Stewart; 1489–1513; 1st of Traquair
John Stewart; 1498–1551; 3rd Earl of Buchan	William Stewart d. 1538; 2nd of Traquair
John Stewart d. 1547; Master of Buchan	Robert Stewart d. 1548; 3rd of Traquair	Sir; John Stewart d. 1591; 4th of Traquair	Sir; William Stewart d. 1605; 5th of Traquair	James Stewart d. 1606; 6th of Traquair
Christina Stewart c. 1548–1580; 4th Countess of Buchan, suo jure	Robert Douglas d. 1580; 4th Earl of Buchan, jure uxoris	John Stewart d. 1606; Younger of Traquair
Lord Stewart of Traquair, 1628; Earl of Traquair and Lord Linton and Caberston
John Douglas d. 1547; 5th Earl of Buchan	John Erskine c. 1558–1634; 19th/2nd Earl of Mar	John Stewart; 1600–1659; 1st Earl of Traquair, Lord Stewart of Traquair, and Lord Linton and Caberston
Mary Douglas d. 1628; 6th Countess of Buchan, suo jure	James Erskine d. 1640; 6th Earl of Buchan, jure uxoris	Henry Erskine; 1672–1745; 1st Lord (Master of) Cardross	John Stewart; 1623–1666; 2nd Earl of Traquair, Lord Stewart of Traquair, and Lord Linton and Caberston
James Erskine d. 1664; 7th Earl of Buchan	David Erskine; 1626–1671; 2nd Lord Cardross	William Stewart; 1657–1673; 3rd Earl of Traquair, Lord Stewart of Traquair, and Lord Linton and Caberston	Charles Stewart; 1659–1741; 4th Earl of Traquair, Lord Stewart of Traquair, and Lord Linton and Caberston
William Erskine d. 1695; 8th Earl of Buchan	Henry Erskine; 1650–1693; 3rd Lord Cardross	Charles Stewart; 1697–1764; 5th Earl of Traquair, Lord Stewart of Traquair, and Lord Linton and Caberston	John Stewart; 1698–1779; 6th Earl of Traquair, Lord Stewart of Traquair, and Lord Linton and Caberston
David Erskine; 1672–1745; 9th Earl of Buchan, 4th Lord Cardross	Charles Stewart; 1746–1827; 7th Earl of Traquair, Lord Stewart of Traquair, and Lord Linton and Caberston
Henry Erskine; 1710–1767; 10th Earl of Buchan, 5th Lord Cardross	Charles Stewart; 1781–1861; 8th Earl of Traquair, Lord Stewart of Traquair, and Lord Linton and Caberston
Earldom of Traquair, Lordship Stewart of Traquair, and Lordship Linton and Caberston extinct, 1861
Baron Erskine of Restormel Castle in the County of Cornwall, 1806
David Erskine; 1742–1829; 11th Earl of Buchan, 6th Lord Cardross	Henry Erskine; 1746–1817	Thomas Erskine; 1750–1823; 1st Baron Erskine
David Erskine	Henry Erskine; 1783–1857; 12th Earl of Buchan, 7th Lord Cardross	David Montagu Erskine; 1776–1855; 2nd Baron Erskine
David Erskine; 1815–1899; 13th Earl of Buchan, 8th Lord Cardross	Thomas Americus Erskine; 1802–1877; 3rd Baron Erskine	John Cadwalader Erskine; 1804–1882; 4th Baron Erskine
Shipley Gordon Stuart Erskine; 1850–1934; 14th Earl of Buchan, 9th Lord Cardross	William Macnagthen Erskine; 1841–1913; 5th Baron Erskine
Ronald Douglas Stewart Mar; 1878–1960; 15th Earl of Buchan, 10th Lord Cardross	Montagu Erskine; 1865–1957; 6th Baron Erskine
Donald Cardross Flower Erskine; 1899–1984; 16th Earl of Buchan, 11th Lord Cardross, 7th Baron Erskine
Malcom Henry Erskine; 1930–2022; 17th Earl of Buchan, 12th Lord Cardross, 8th Baron Erskine
Henry Thomas Alexander Erskine b. 1960; 18th Earl of Buchan, 13th Lord Cardross, 9th Baron Erskine
Alexander Erskine b. 1990; Lord Cardross
