= Earl of Buchan =

Title of nobility in the United Kingdom

Earldom of Buchan
- Blazon: Quarterly: 1st, Azure a Barrulet en crancelin of four Strawberry Leaves between three Garbs Or (Buchan); 2nd, Argent a Pale Sable in dexter canton a Rose Gules barbed and seeded Vert (Erskine); 3rd, Or a Lymphad Sable sails furled and oars in action and at the masthead a Beacon all proper surmounted of a Fess checky Azure and Argent charged with a Mullet of the second (Stewart of Buchan); 4th, Argent a Lion passant guardant Gules crowned with an Imperial Crown and gorged with an Open Crown Or a Label of three points of the second charged on the centre point with a Crescent of the third (Ogilvy of Auchterhouse); on an Escutcheon en surtout Gules an Eagle displayed Or armed and membered Azure looking towards the Sun in Splendour in dexter chief (Lordship of Cardross)
- Creation date: 1469
- Creation: Third
- Created by: James III of Scotland
- Peerage: Peerage of Scotland
- First holder: James Stewart
- Present holder: Henry Erskine, 18th Earl
- Heir apparent: Alexander Erskine, Lord Cardross
- Subsidiary titles: Lord Cardross
- Seat: Newnham House

Earldom of Buchan

The Arms of the Realm and Ancient Local Principalities of Scotland

The Mormaer (/mɔːrˈmɛər/) or Earl of Buchan (/ˈbʌxən/) was originally the provincial ruler of the medieval province of Buchan. Buchan was the first Mormaerdom in the High Medieval Kingdom of the Scots to pass into the hands of a non-Scottish family in the male line. The earldom had three lines in its history, not counting passings from female heirs to sons. Today, it is held by the Erskine family as a peerage. The current holder is Harry Erskine, 18th Earl of Buchan (b. 1960). Subsidiary titles are Lord Cardross and Lord Auchterhouse and Baron Erskine.

== Mormaerdom of Buchan ==
The first recorded person who definitely held the position of mormaer was Gartnait, whose patronage is noted in the Gaelic Notes on the Book of Deer. The latter is the only significant source for the mormaerdom, and its existence makes Buchan one of Scotland's best documented provinces for native cultural institutions. After the death of Fergus, before 1214, Buchan became the first native mormaerdom to pass into the hands of a foreign family, the Comyns, though only through marriage. Alexander Comyn, Earl of Buchan inherited and continued his mother's title and line until it was conquered and forfeited during the Wars of Scottish Independence.

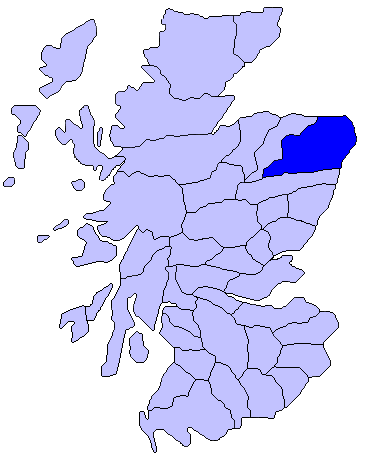
Former extent of the Earldom of Buchan

== 1374 creation ==
The title remained in crown hands until, later in the century, the title went to Alexander Stewart, the "Wolf of Badenoch". By this point, however, Buchan was drastically truncated and no longer a provincial lordship.

== 1469 creation ==
In 1469 the earldom was conferred on James Stewart. He was made Lord Auchterhouse at the same time, also in the Peerage of Scotland. Stewart was the second son of Sir James Stewart, the Black Knight of Lorn, and the younger brother of John Stewart, 1st Earl of Atholl (see Earl of Atholl, 1457 creation). The title descended in the direct male line until the death of his grandson, John, the third Earl, in 1551. John's only son by his first marriage, John Stewart, Master of Buchan, had been killed at the Battle of Pinkie in 1547. Buchan was therefore succeeded by his granddaughter, Christina, suo jure Countess of Buchan, the daughter of the Master of Buchan. She married Robert Douglas, son of Sir Robert Douglas of Lochleven and brother of William Douglas, 6th Earl of Morton. Robert assumed the title of Earl of Buchan in right of his wife. He was succeeded by his daughter, Mary, suo jure Countess of Buchan. She married James Erskine, younger son of John Erskine, Earl of Mar. James assumed the earldom in right of his wife. In 1617 they were created by Royal charter Earl and Countess of Buchan, with remainder to the heirs male of the marriage, whom failing, to the legitimate and nearest heirs-male and assignees of the Earl. In 1633 the precedence of the earldom was established by Act of Parliament as 1469. This line of the family failed on the death of their grandson, the eighth Earl, who died unmarried in 1695. The title passed by the terms of the 1617 charter to the heirs male of the 6th Earl i.e. to the heirs male of his younger brother Henry Erskine (see below). Since 1695, the earls of Buchan are not heirs of line of the 1st Earl of Buchan.

The late Earl was succeeded by his kinsman David Erskine, 4th Lord Cardross, who became the ninth Earl. He was the great-grandson of Henry Erskine, younger brother of James Erskine, Earl of Buchan (of the 1617 creation; see Lord Cardross for earlier history of this branch of the Erskine family). His right to the earldom was acknowledged by the Scottish Parliament in 1698 and he later sat in the House of Lords as a Scottish representative peer. He was succeeded by his eldest surviving son, the tenth Earl. He was a Fellow of the Royal Society. His eldest surviving son, David, the eleventh Earl, was the founder of the Society of Antiquaries of Scotland but is best remembered as an eccentric. The latter was succeeded by his nephew, Henry, the twelfth Earl, the son of Henry Erskine, Lord Advocate, third son of the tenth Earl. In 1850 Caroline, the wife of the 12th Earl, and David the 13th Earl, both converted to Roman Catholicism.

The line of the twelfth Earl failed on the death of his great-grandson, the fifteenth Earl, who died unmarried in 1960. The fifteenth Earl was succeeded by his kinsman, Donald Erskine, 7th Baron Erskine, who became the sixteenth Earl. He was a descendant of Lord Chancellor Thomas Erskine, 1st Baron Erskine, fourth son of the tenth Earl (see Baron Erskine for earlier history of this branch of the family). As of 2022, the titles are held by the sixteenth Earl's grandson, the eighteenth Earl, who succeeded his father in that year.

The family seat is Newnham House, near Newnham, Hampshire.

== List of titleholders ==
=== Early Mormaers/Earls of Buchan ===
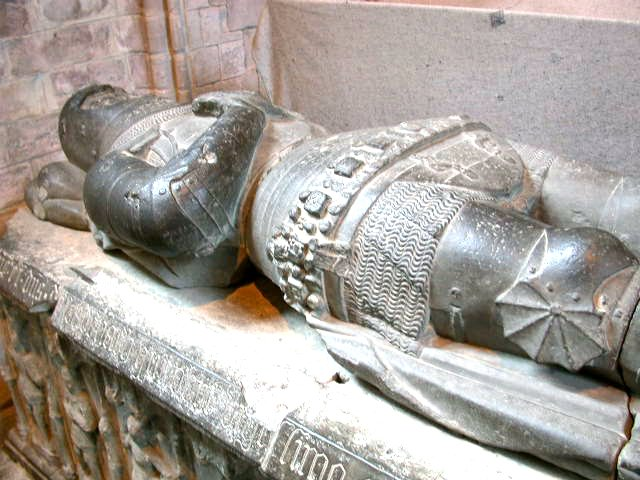
Sarcophagus-effigy of Alexander Stewart, Earl of Buchan, at Dunkeld Cathedral, where he was buried.

- Unknowns
- ?Cainnech (fl. early 12th century)
- Gartnait (fl. after 1131)
- Éva (Éua) ingen Garnait (fl. 1174 )
  - m. Colbán (fl. 1174 )
- Roger de Buchan
- Fergus (d. before 1214)
- Marjory
  - m. William Comyn, Justiciar of Scotia and Warden of Moray (d. 1233)
- Alexander Comyn (d. 1289)
- John Comyn (d. 1308)
  - Forfeited; the earldom was then successfully claimed for Alice Comyn, Countess of Buchan, by her husband Henry Beaumont (died 1340)

=== Earls of Buchan; Second creation (1374) ===
- Alexander Stewart, Earl of Buchan (d. 1394 or 1405)
- Robert Stewart, Duke of Albany (d. 1420), in 1406 he granted earldom to his son
- John Stewart, Earl of Buchan (d. 1424) – Killed at the Battle of Verneuil
- James I of Scotland. (d. 1437)
  - Mary Stewart, Countess of Buchan (1428–1465), Countess from 1444
  - Wolfert VI van Borselen (1433–1489), jure uxoris Earl of Buchan from 1444 until 1469, Stadholder of Holland, Friesland and Zeeland

=== Earls of Buchan; Third creation (1469) ===
- James Stewart, 1st Earl of Buchan (1442–1487)
- Alexander Stewart, 2nd Earl of Buchan (d. 1505)
- John Stewart, 3rd Earl of Buchan (c. 1497–1551)
- Christina Stewart, 4th Countess of Buchan (d. 1580)
- James Douglas, 5th Earl of Buchan (d. 1601)
- Mary Douglas, 6th Countess of Buchan (d. 1628) (title of 6th Earl assumed by her husband James Erskine, 6th Earl of Buchan (died 1640))
- James Erskine, 7th Earl of Buchan (succeeded 1640, d. 1664)
- William Erskine, 8th Earl of Buchan (d. 1695)
- David Erskine, 9th Earl of Buchan (d. 1745)
- Henry David Erskine, 10th Earl of Buchan (1710–1767)
- David Stewart Erskine, 11th Earl of Buchan (1742–1829)
- Henry David Erskine, 12th Earl of Buchan (1783–1857)
- David Stuart Erskine, 13th Earl of Buchan (1815–1898)
- Shipley Gordon Stuart Erskine, 14th Earl of Buchan (1850–1934)
- Ronald Douglas Stewart Mar Erskine, 15th Earl of Buchan (1878–1960)
- Donald Cardross Flower Erskine, 16th Earl of Buchan (1899–1984)
- Malcolm Erskine, 17th Earl of Buchan (1930–2022)
- Henry Thomas Alexander Erskine, 18th Earl of Buchan (b. 1960)

== Present peer ==
Henry Erskine, 18th Earl of Buchan (born 31 May 1960) is the elder son of the 17th Earl and his wife Hilary Diana Cecil Power. He was educated at Eton College and was styled as Lord Cardross between 1984 and 11 September 2022, when he succeeded to the peerages. In 1987 he married Charlotte Catherine Lucinda Beaumont, a daughter of Matthew Henry Beaumont and a granddaughter of Wentworth Beaumont, 2nd Viscount Allendale. They had two sons:

- Alexander Erskine, Lord Cardross (born 1990), heir apparent
- Frederick Alastair Erskine (born 1992)

== Family tree ==
Family tree of the Earls of Buchan, Earls of Traquair and Barons Erskine

James Stewart c. 1399–c. 1451 "the Black Knight of Lorn"	Joan Beaufort c. 1404–1445; Queen of Scots	James I 1394–1437; King of Scots
Earl of Atholl (8th creation), 1457	Earl of Buchan (3rd creation) and Lord Auchterhouse, 1469
John Stewart c. 1437–1442–1513; 1st Earl of Atholl	James Stewart; 1442–1499; 1st Earl of Buchan, Lord Auchterhouse
Stewarts of Traquair
Alexander Stewart d. 1505; 2nd Earl of Buchan	John Stewart; 1489–1513; 1st of Traquair
John Stewart; 1498–1551; 3rd Earl of Buchan	William Stewart d. 1538; 2nd of Traquair
John Stewart d. 1547; Master of Buchan	Robert Stewart d. 1548; 3rd of Traquair	Sir; John Stewart d. 1591; 4th of Traquair	Sir; William Stewart d. 1605; 5th of Traquair	James Stewart d. 1606; 6th of Traquair
Christina Stewart c. 1548–1580; 4th Countess of Buchan, suo jure	Robert Douglas d. 1580; 4th Earl of Buchan, jure uxoris	John Stewart d. 1606; Younger of Traquair
Lord Stewart of Traquair, 1628; Earl of Traquair and Lord Linton and Caberston
John Douglas d. 1547; 5th Earl of Buchan	John Erskine c. 1558–1634; 19th/2nd Earl of Mar	John Stewart; 1600–1659; 1st Earl of Traquair, Lord Stewart of Traquair, and Lord Linton and Caberston
Mary Douglas d. 1628; 6th Countess of Buchan, suo jure	James Erskine d. 1640; 6th Earl of Buchan, jure uxoris	Henry Erskine; 1672–1745; 1st Lord (Master of) Cardross	John Stewart; 1623–1666; 2nd Earl of Traquair, Lord Stewart of Traquair, and Lord Linton and Caberston
James Erskine d. 1664; 7th Earl of Buchan	David Erskine; 1626–1671; 2nd Lord Cardross	William Stewart; 1657–1673; 3rd Earl of Traquair, Lord Stewart of Traquair, and Lord Linton and Caberston	Charles Stewart; 1659–1741; 4th Earl of Traquair, Lord Stewart of Traquair, and Lord Linton and Caberston
William Erskine d. 1695; 8th Earl of Buchan	Henry Erskine; 1650–1693; 3rd Lord Cardross	Charles Stewart; 1697–1764; 5th Earl of Traquair, Lord Stewart of Traquair, and Lord Linton and Caberston	John Stewart; 1698–1779; 6th Earl of Traquair, Lord Stewart of Traquair, and Lord Linton and Caberston
David Erskine; 1672–1745; 9th Earl of Buchan, 4th Lord Cardross	Charles Stewart; 1746–1827; 7th Earl of Traquair, Lord Stewart of Traquair, and Lord Linton and Caberston
Henry Erskine; 1710–1767; 10th Earl of Buchan, 5th Lord Cardross	Charles Stewart; 1781–1861; 8th Earl of Traquair, Lord Stewart of Traquair, and Lord Linton and Caberston
Earldom of Traquair, Lordship Stewart of Traquair, and Lordship Linton and Caberston extinct, 1861
Baron Erskine of Restormel Castle in the County of Cornwall, 1806
David Erskine; 1742–1829; 11th Earl of Buchan, 6th Lord Cardross	Henry Erskine; 1746–1817	Thomas Erskine; 1750–1823; 1st Baron Erskine
David Erskine	Henry Erskine; 1783–1857; 12th Earl of Buchan, 7th Lord Cardross	David Montagu Erskine; 1776–1855; 2nd Baron Erskine
David Erskine; 1815–1899; 13th Earl of Buchan, 8th Lord Cardross	Thomas Americus Erskine; 1802–1877; 3rd Baron Erskine	John Cadwalader Erskine; 1804–1882; 4th Baron Erskine
Shipley Gordon Stuart Erskine; 1850–1934; 14th Earl of Buchan, 9th Lord Cardross	William Macnagthen Erskine; 1841–1913; 5th Baron Erskine
Ronald Douglas Stewart Mar; 1878–1960; 15th Earl of Buchan, 10th Lord Cardross	Montagu Erskine; 1865–1957; 6th Baron Erskine
Donald Cardross Flower Erskine; 1899–1984; 16th Earl of Buchan, 11th Lord Cardross, 7th Baron Erskine
Malcom Henry Erskine; 1930–2022; 17th Earl of Buchan, 12th Lord Cardross, 8th Baron Erskine
Henry Thomas Alexander Erskine b. 1960; 18th Earl of Buchan, 13th Lord Cardross, 9th Baron Erskine
Alexander Erskine b. 1990; Lord Cardross

== See also ==
- Earl of Atholl
- Earl of Mar
- Lord Cardross
- Baron Erskine

== Bibliography ==
- Anderson, Alan Orr, Early Sources of Scottish History: AD 500–1286, 2 vols. (Edinburgh, 1922), Vol. II, p. 180, n. 3
- Jackson, Kenneth (ed.), The Gaelic Notes in the Book of Deer (The Osborn Bergin Memorial Lecture 1970), (Cambridge, 1972)
- Paul, James Balfour, The Scots Peerage, Vol. II, (Edinburgh, 1909)
- Roberts, John L., Lost Kingdoms: Celtic Scotland in the Middle Ages, (Edinburgh, 1997), pp. 55–6
- Young, Alan, "Buchan in the 13th century" in Alexander Grant & Keith J. Stringer (eds.) Medieval Scotland: Crown, Lordship and Community Essays Presented to G. W. S. Barrow, (Edinburgh, 1993)
- Hesilrige, Arthur G. M. (1921). Debrett's Peerage and Titles of courtesy. London: London: Dean & son, limited. p. 148.
