= Malcolm Erskine, 17th Earl of Buchan =

Scottish landowner and peer (1930–2022)

Malcolm Harry Erskine, 17th Earl of Buchan (4 July 1930 – 11 September 2022) was a Scottish landowner and peer, a member of the House of Lords from 1984 until the House of Lords Act 1999 removed most hereditary peers.

The younger son of Donald Cardross Flower Erskine, 16th Earl of Buchan, and his wife Christina Baxendale (daughter of Titanic survivor Hugh Woolner), he became his father's heir due to the death of his brother David Stuart Erskine (1928–1933) in childhood. He was educated at Eton College and was styled as Lord Cardross between 1960 and 1984, when he succeeded as the Earl of Buchan (1469), Lord Auchterhouse (1469), Lord Cardross (1610) and Baron Erskine of Restormel Castle (1806). The last of these was in the Peerage of the United Kingdom, the others in that of Scotland.

On 21 February 1957, Buchan married Hilary Diana Cecil Power, a daughter of Sir Ivan Power, 2nd Baronet, and his first wife Nancy Hilary Griffiths, and they had four children:

- Henry Thomas Alexander Erskine, 18th Earl of Buchan (born 1960)
- Lady Seraphina Mary Erskine (born 1961)
- Hon. Montagu John Erskine (born 1966)
- Lady Arabella Fleur Erskine (born 1969)

In 1972, as Lord Cardross, Buchan became a Justice of the Peace for Westminster and was also a Liveryman of the Worshipful Company of Grocers. He was chairman of Battersea Dogs Home.

In 1998 in response to plans for Scottish devolution, he asserted that should these give rise to independence he would establish his claim to the throne of Scotland. In 2003, Buchan was living at Newnham House, Newnham, Hampshire. He died on 11 September 2022, at the age of 92.

== Notes ==
Peerage of Scotland
Preceded by Donald Cardross Flower Erskine	Earl of Buchan; 1984–2022	Succeeded by Henry Thomas Alexander Erskine

== Family tree ==
Male-line family tree, Earls of Buchan, Earls of Traquair and Barons Erskine.

James Stewart; 1st Earl of Buchan; 1442–1499
Stewarts of Traquair
Alexander Stewart; 2nd Earl of Buchan died 1505	John Stewart; 1st of Traquair; 1489-1513
John Stewart; 3rd Earl of Buchan; 1498–1551	William Stewart; 2nd of Traquair died 1538
John Stewart; Master of Buchan died 1547	Robert Stewart; 3rd of Traquair died 1548	Sir; John Stewart; 4th of Traquair died 1591	Sir; William Stewart; 5th of Traquair died 1605	James Stewart; 6th of Traquair died 1606
Robert Douglas; 4th Earl of Buchan died 1580	Christina Stewart; 4th Countess of Buchan; 1498–1551	John Stewart younger of Traquair died 1606
Earls of Traquair
John Douglas; 5th Earl of Buchan died 1547	John Erskine; 19th/2nd Earl of Mar; 1562-1634	John Stewart; 1st Earl of Traquair; 1600-1659
Mary Douglas; 6th Countess of Buchan died 1628	James Erskine; 6th Earl of Buchan died 1640	Henry Erskine; Master of Cardross; 1672-1745	John Stewart; 2nd Earl of Traquair; 1623-1666
James Erskine; 7th Earl of Buchan died 1664	David Erskine; 2nd Lord Cardross; 1626-1671	William Stewart; 3rd Earl of Traquair; 1657-1673	Charles Stewart; 4th Earl of Traquair; 1659-1741
William Erskine; 8th Earl of Buchan died 1695	Henry Erskine; 3rd Lord Cardross; 1650-1693	Charles Stewart; 5th Earl of Traquair; 1697-1764	John Stewart; 6th Earl of Traquair; 1698-1779
David Erskine; 9th Earl of Buchan; 1672-1745	Charles Stewart; 7th Earl of Traquair; 1746-1827
Henry Erskine; 10th Earl of Buchan; 1710-1767	Charles Stewart; 8th Earl of Traquair; 1781-1861
David Erskine; 11th Earl of Buchan; 1742-1829	Hon. Henry Erskine; 1746-1817	Thomas Erskine; 1st Baron Erskine; 1750-1823
Sir David Erskine	Henry Erskine; 12th Earl of Buchan; 1783-1857	David Erskine; 2nd Baron Erskine; 1776-1855
Baron Erskine
David Erskine; 13th Earl of Buchan; 1815-1899	Thomas Erskine; 3rd Baron Erskine; 1802-1877	John Erskine; 4th Baron Erskine; 1804-1882
Shipley Erskine; 14th Earl of Buchan; 1850-1934	William Erskine; 5th Baron Erskine; 1841-1913
Ronald Erskine; 15th Earl of Buchan; 1878-1960	Montagu Erskine; 6th Baron Erskine; 1865-1957
Donald Erskine; 16th Earl of Buchan; 1899-1984
Malcom Erskine; 17th Earl of Buchan; 1930–2022
Henry Erskine; 18th Earl of Buchan born 1960
Alexander Erskine; Lord Cardross born 1990
