= James Stuart Erskine =

James Stuart, Freiherr von Erskine (4 September 1821 in Ifield, West Sussex – 4 June 1904) was an English businessman who was ennobled by King Ludwig II of Bavaria

== Early life ==
Erskine was born on 4 September 1821, as the youngest son of MP and diplomat David Erskine, 2nd Baron Erskine and, his first wife, Frances Cadwalader (1781–1843). Among his siblings were Thomas Erskine, 3rd Baron Erskine and John Erskine, 4th Baron Erskine (both diplomats); Steuarta Erskine (who married Timothy Yeats Brown); Elizabeth Erskine (who married Sir St Vincent Hawkins-Whitshed, 2nd Baronet); David Montagu Erskine (a Lt.-Col. in the British Army); Edward Morris Erskine (also a diplomat); Sevilla Erskine (who married Sir Henry Howard); Jane Plumer Erskine (who married James Callander of Craigforth and Ardkinglas); and Mary Erskine (who married Graf Hermann von Paumgarten).

His paternal grandparents were Thomas Erskine, 1st Baron Erskine (himself a fourth son of Henry Erskine, 10th Earl of Buchan) and the former Frances Moore (a daughter of Daniel Moore). His maternal grandparents were John Cadwalader, an American general during the Revolutionary War, and his second wife, Williamina Bond (a daughter of Dr. Phineas Bond, of Philadelphia and niece of Dr. Thomas Bond).

== Career ==
Erskine went to Bavaria and founded the German Erskine line. He was created Freiherr in the nobility register in the Kingdom of Bavaria on 18 January 1872.

== Personal life ==
On 27 February 1849, Erskine married Wilhelmina Gräfin von Törring Minucci (b. 1827), daughter of Anton Josef Clemens Graf von Törring Minucci. Her sister, Josephine Wilhelmine Franziska Gräfin von Törring Minucci, also married into the British aristocracy when she wed Francis Orlando Henry Bridgeman, son of Hon. Orlando Henry Bridgeman (a son of Orlando Bridgeman, 1st Earl of Bradford) and Lady Selina Needham (a daughter of Francis Needham, 1st Earl of Kilmorey). Together, they were the parents of:

- Franziska Maria Antonia Freiin von Erskine (1850-1887)
- Hermine Marie von Erskine (born 1852), who married Professor Hermann von Sicherer in 1884.
- Hermann David Montagu, Freiherr von Erskine (1854–1934), a Lieutenant in the Bavarian Army.
- Alfred Francis Stewart (1860-1862)
- Stuarta Franziska Maria Anna Elisabeth (1864-1891)

Freiherr Erskine died on 4 June 1904.
