= Cadwalader family =

American family

Cadwalader
- Current region: Pennsylvania and New Jersey, U.S.
- Origin: Wales, Kingdom of Great Britain
- Connected families: Schuyler family Biddle family

The Cadwalader family is an American family of military and civilian leaders that were prominent from the late 18th through 19th centuries in Philadelphia and New Jersey. The progenitor of the family, John Cadwalader, was a Quaker who emigrated from Wales in part to escape religious persecution.

== History ==
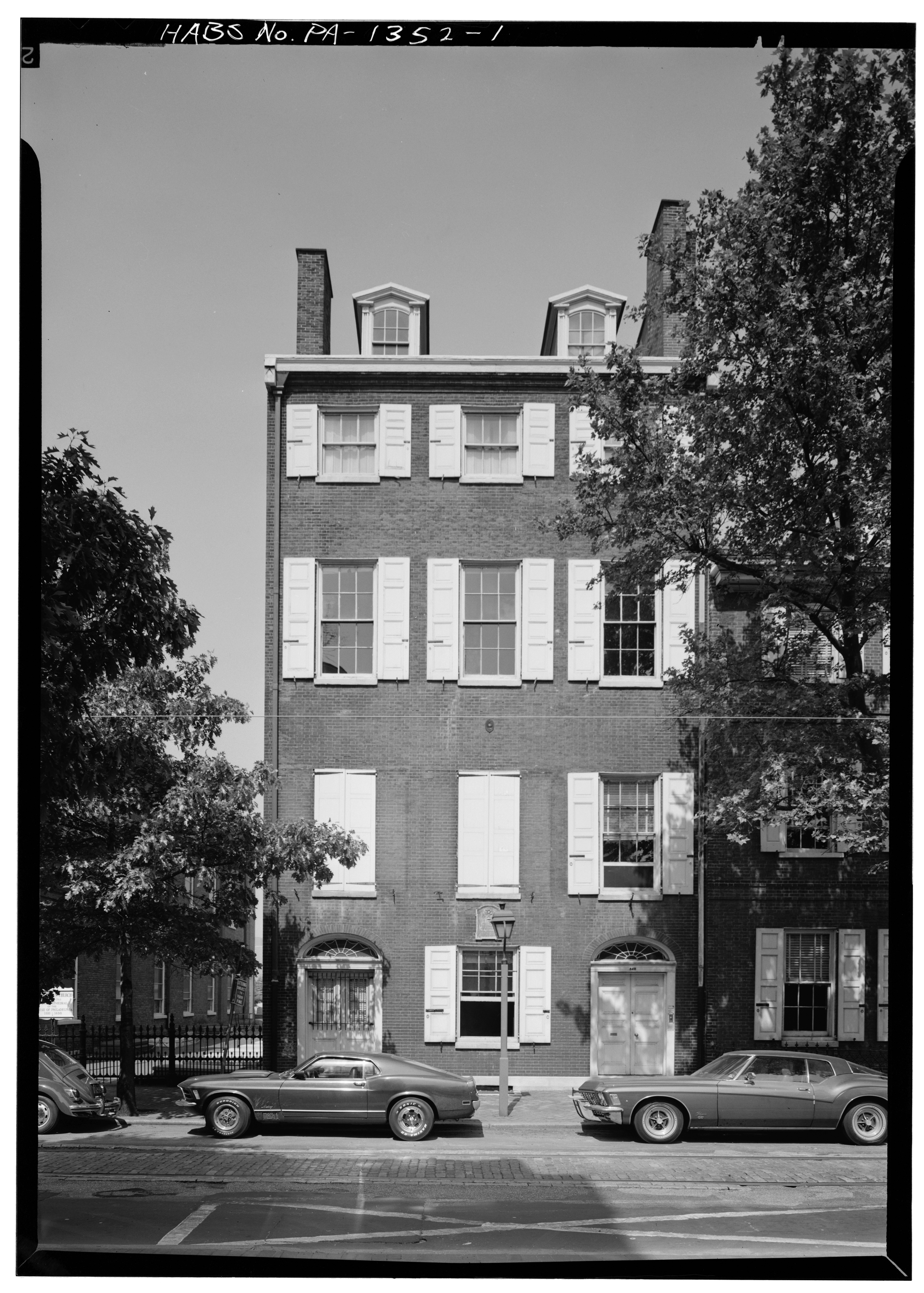
The Cadwalader House at 240 S. 4th Street, in Center City Philadelphia

John Cadwalader (1677–1734), the patriarch of the Cadwalader family, was born in Bala, Wales before coming to the Province of Pennsylvania in British America in 1697, seeking a place to practice the Quaker religion without repression. After inheriting money from his father and uncle, he set himself up as a merchant in Philadelphia and became active in local politics, serving on the Common Council. Upon his death in 1734, he left a substantial estate to his family. John's only son, Dr. Thomas Cadwalader (1707–1779), was born in Philadelphia but returned to Europe to study medicine. He married Hannah Lambert, and together they had eight children.

Among Thomas' children were General John Cadwalader (1742–1786), a commander of Pennsylvania troops in the Continental Army during the Revolutionary War who served under George Washington and was with him at Valley Forge, and Lambert Cadwalader (1742–1823), a merchant and leader in New Jersey and Pennsylvania who also fought in the Revolitionary War, then represented New Jersey in the Continental Congress and the U.S. Congress.

In 1799, General John Cadwalader's daughter, Frances Cadwalader, married into the English aristocracy when she wed the Hon. David Erskine (who later served as British Minister to the U.S. and in 1823 succeeded as the 2nd Baron Erskine). Among their children were Thomas Americus Erskine, 3rd Baron Erskine (1802–1877), and John Cadwalader Erskine, 4th Baron Erskine (1804–1882), Edward Morris Erskine (1817–1883), and James Stuart Erskine (1821–1904), who was created Freiherr von Erskine by Ludwig II of Bavaria.

Lambert Cadwalader married Mary McCall, the daughter of Archibald and Judith (née Kemble) McCall. Their only child was Thomas McCall Cadwalader (1795–1873), who married Maria Charlotte Gouverneur (sister of Samuel Laurence Gouverneur and the niece of Elizabeth Kortright and U.S. President James Monroe).

=== Legacy ===
The Cadwalader family are considered important patrons and supporters of the early artistic and cultural development of the American colonies as well as the new republic. They commissioned works by American masters, including Charles Willson Peale, Thomas Eakins, and Susan Macdowell Eakins.

=== Prominent members ===
- Thomas Cadwalader (1708–1779)
- John Cadwalader (1742–1786)
- Lambert Cadwalader (1742–1823)
- Thomas McCall Cadwalader (1795–1873)
- Samuel Ringgold (1796–1846)
- Cadwalader Ringgold (1802–1867)
- George A. McCall (1802–1868)
- John Cadwalader (1805–1879)
- George Cadwalader (1806–1879)
- John Lambert Cadwalader (1836–1914)
- Mary Cadwalader Rawle (1850–1935)
- Gouverneur Cadwalader (1880–1935)

== Gallery ==
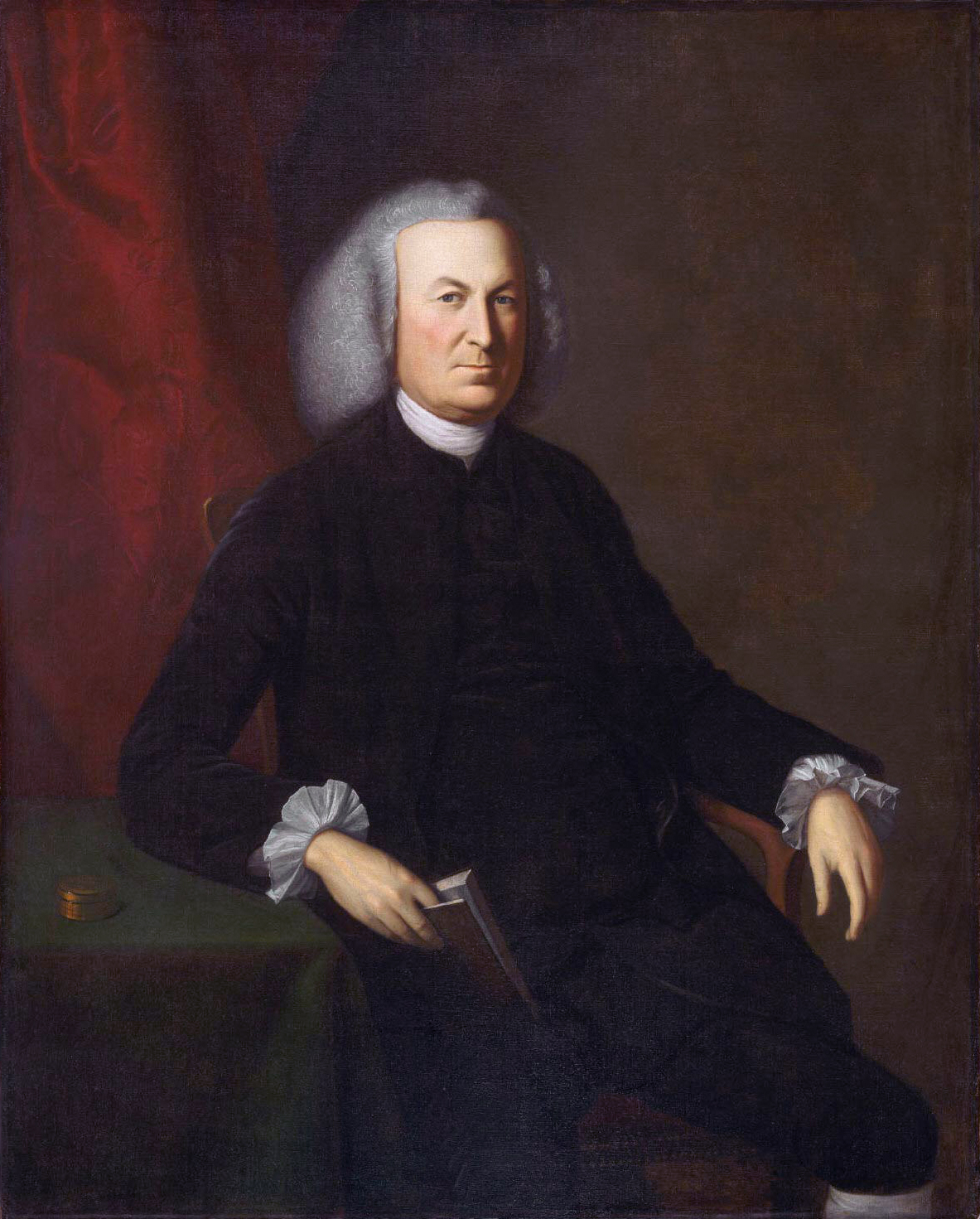
Dr. Thomas Cadwalader, by Charles Willson Peale (1770)

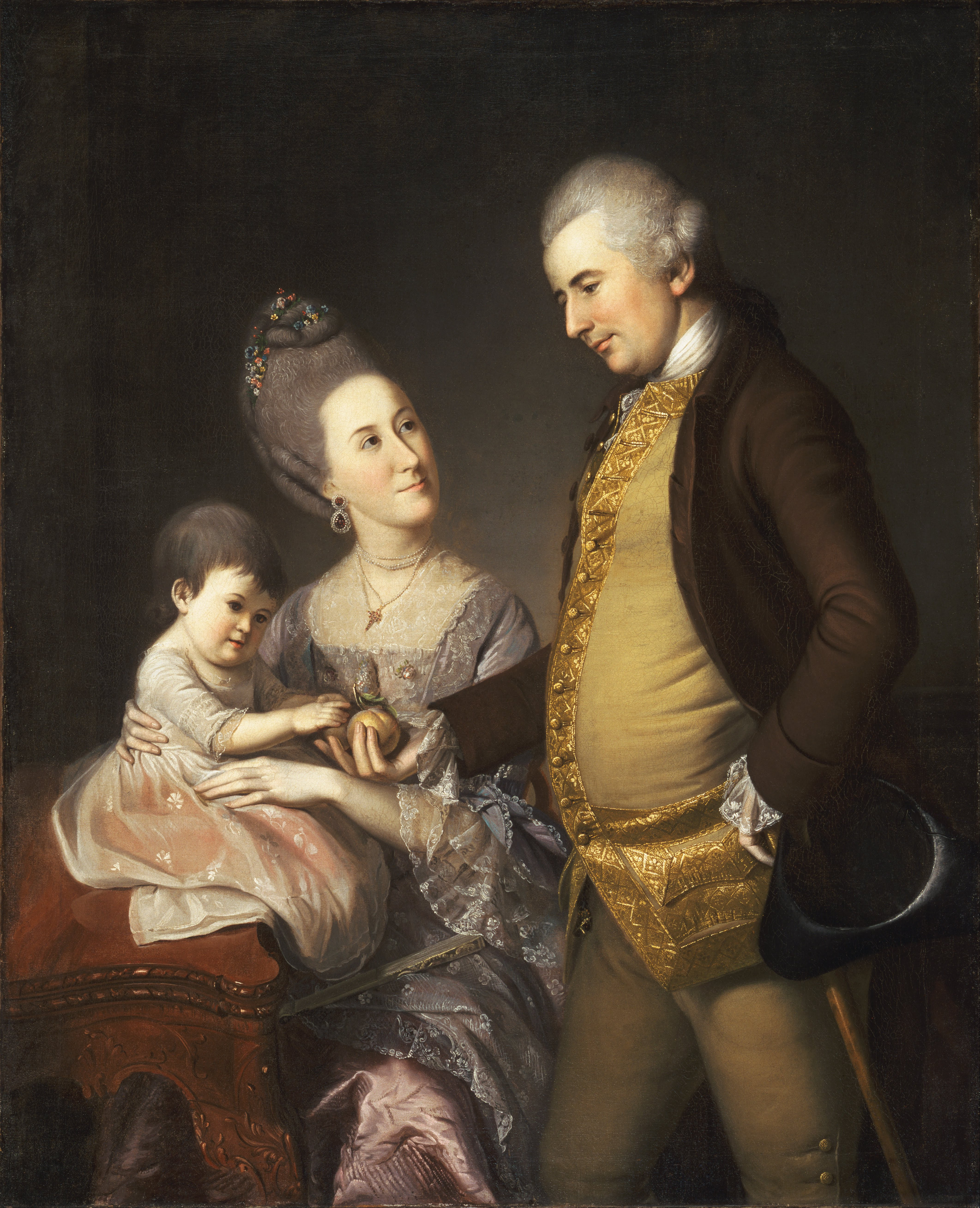
John and Elizabeth Lloyd Cadwalader and their daughter Anne, by Charles Willson Peale (1772)

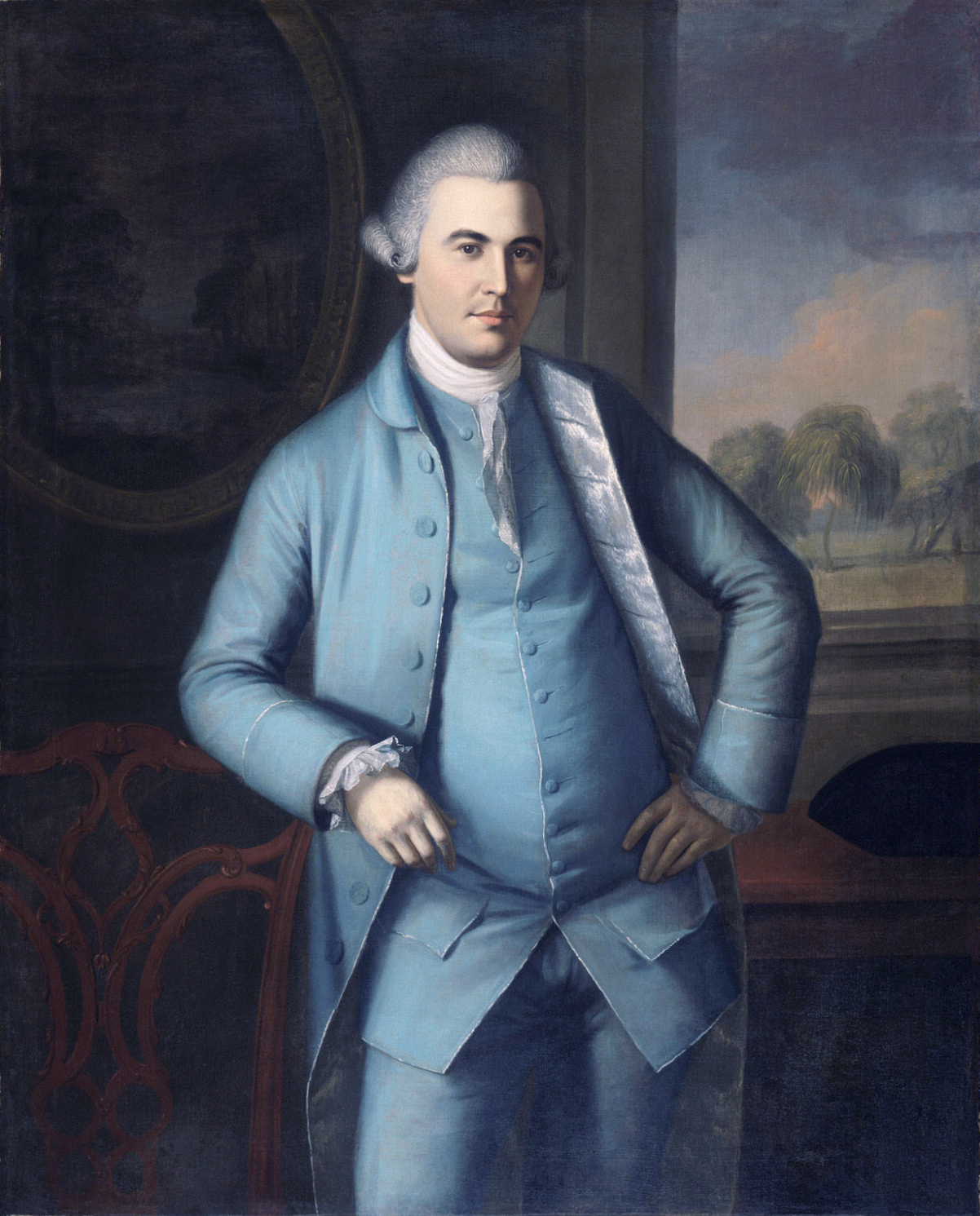
Lambert Cadwalader, by Charles Willson Peale (1771)

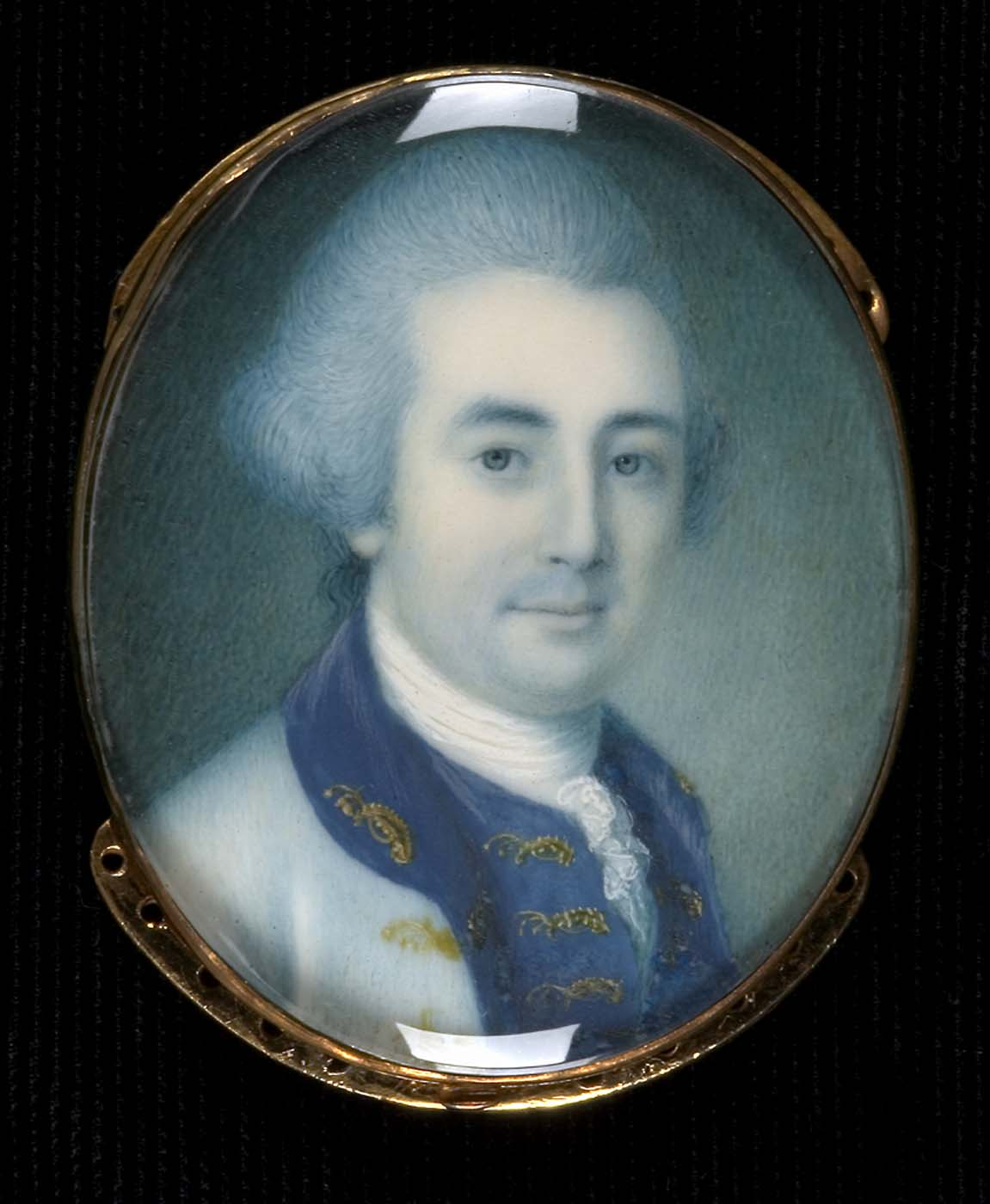
General John Cadwalader, by Charles Willson Peale (c. 1788)

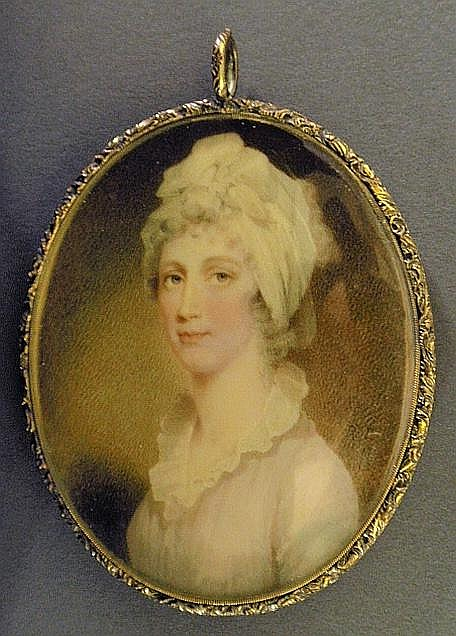
Mrs. John Cadwalader (née Williamina Bond), by Robert Field (1790s)

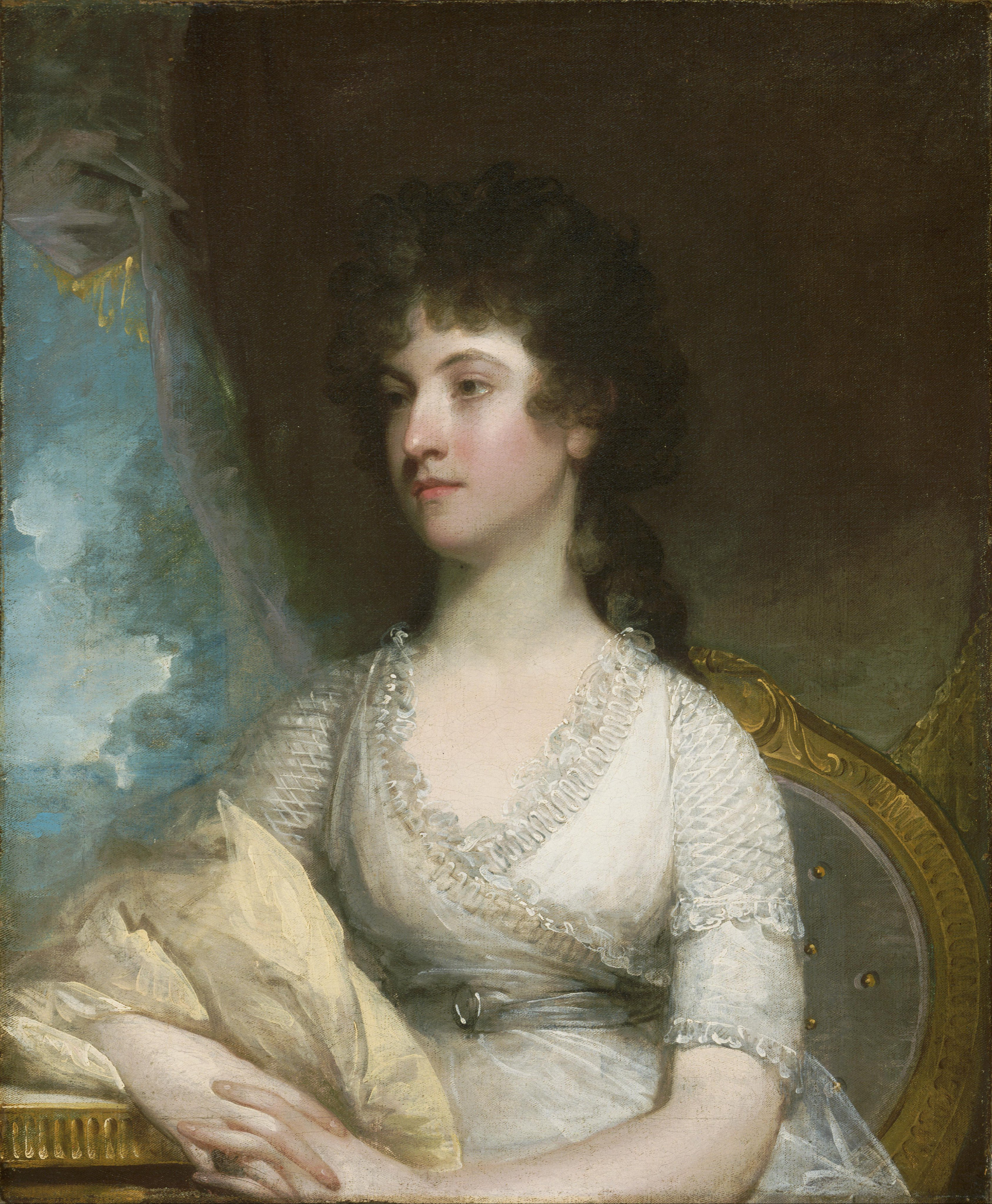
Lady Erskine (née Frances Cadwalader), by Gilbert Stuart (1802)

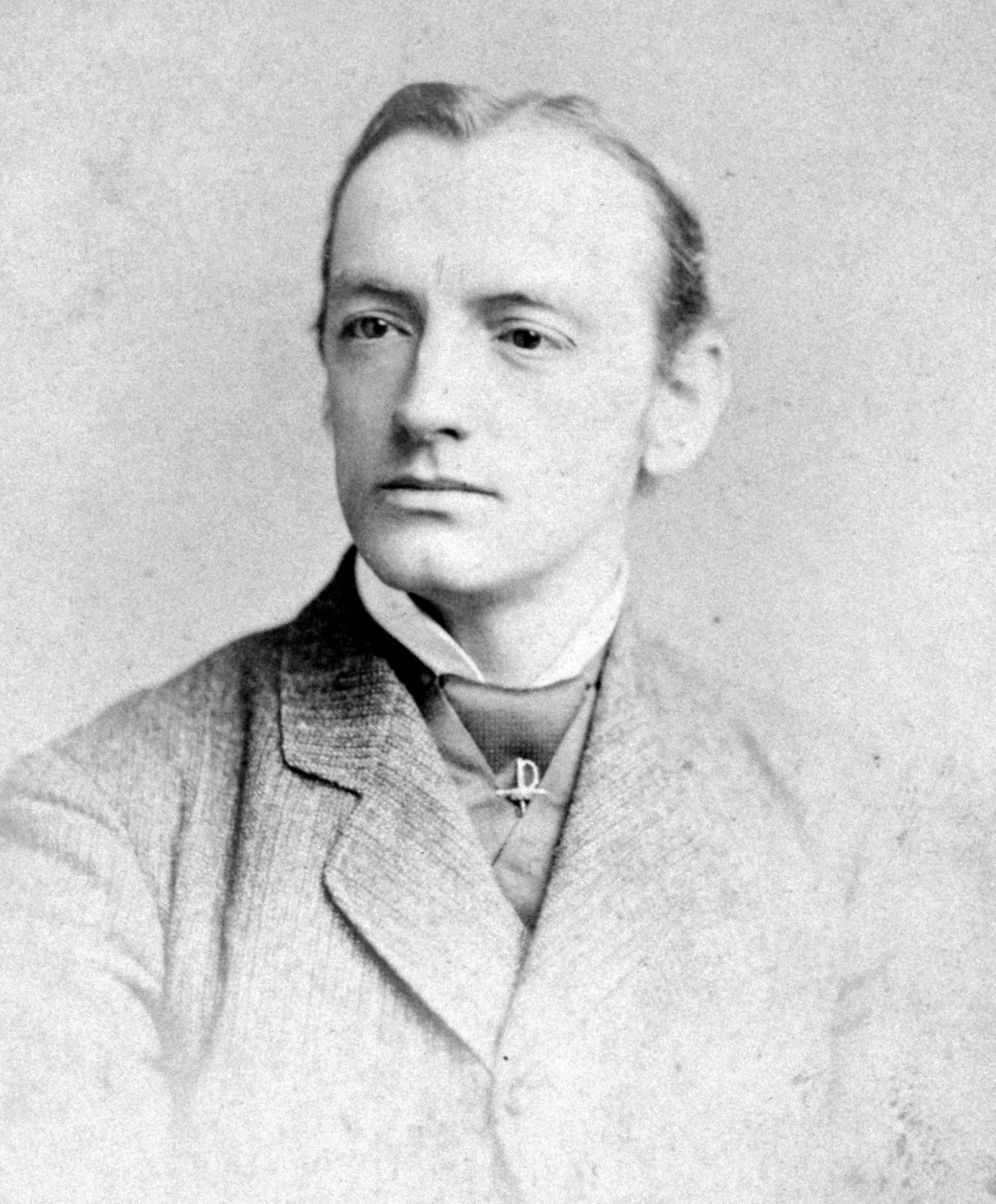
John Cadwalader (c. 1855–1865)

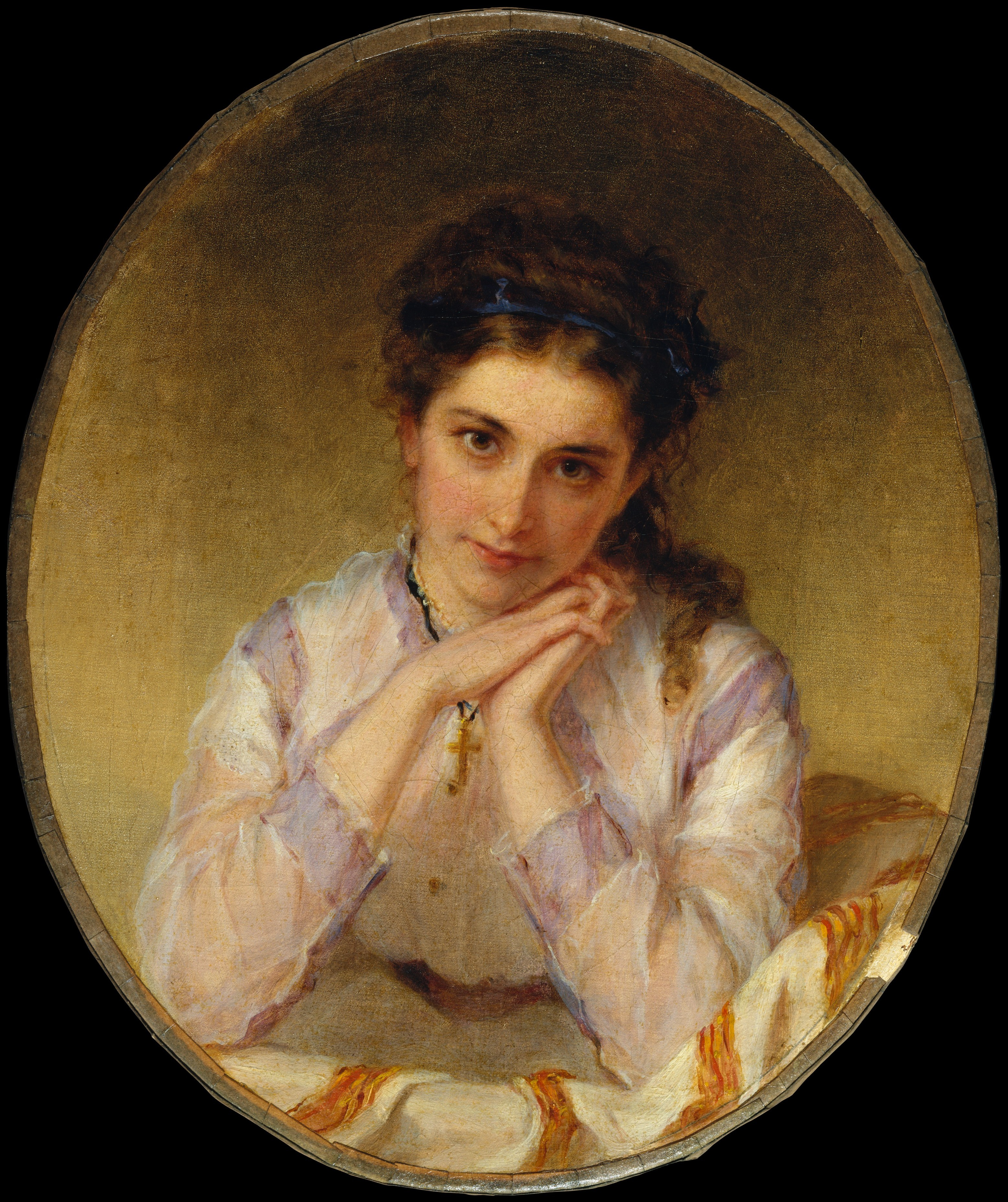
Mary Cadwalader Rawle, by William Oliver Stone (1868)

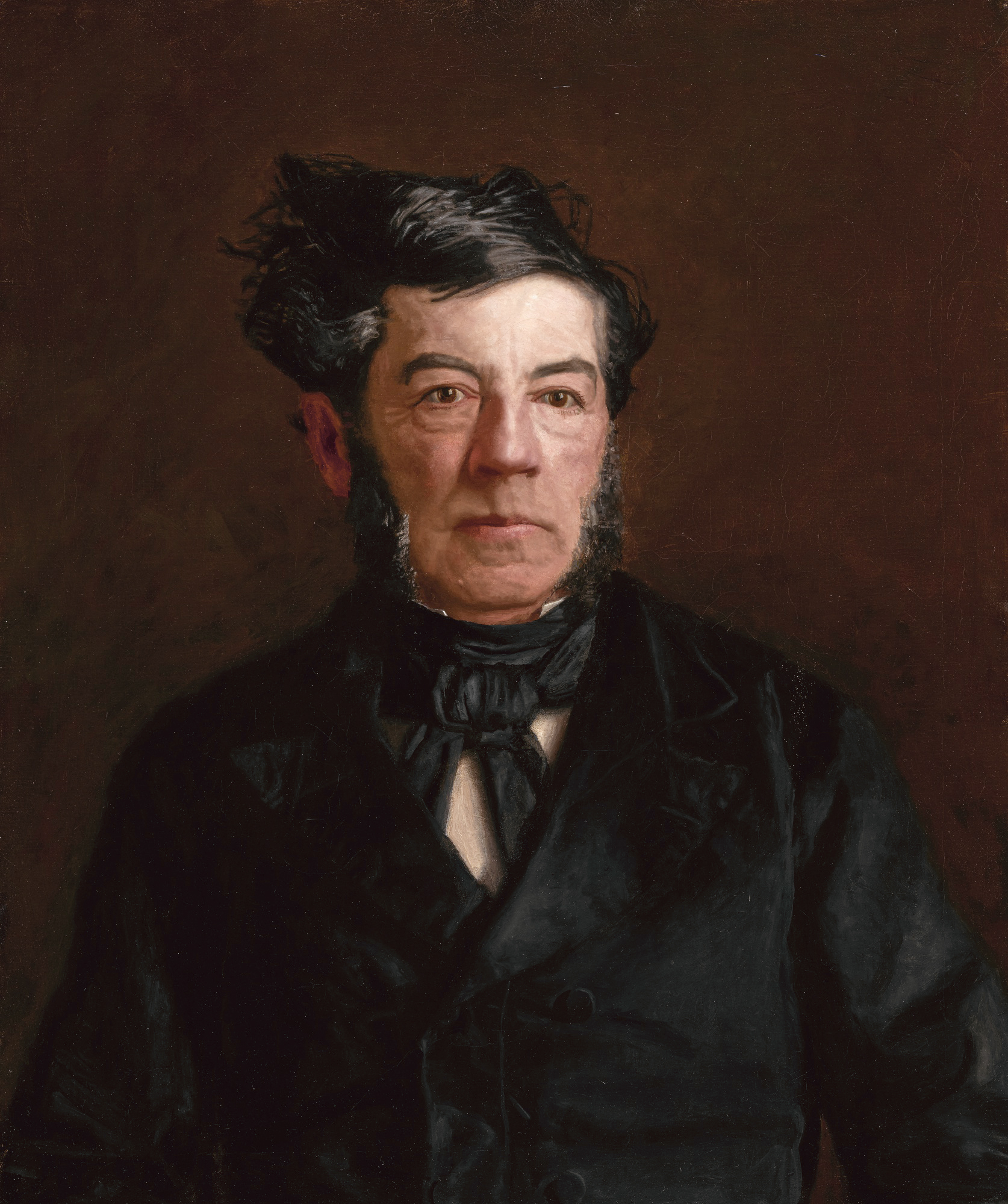
General George Cadwalader, by Thomas Eakins (c. 1880)

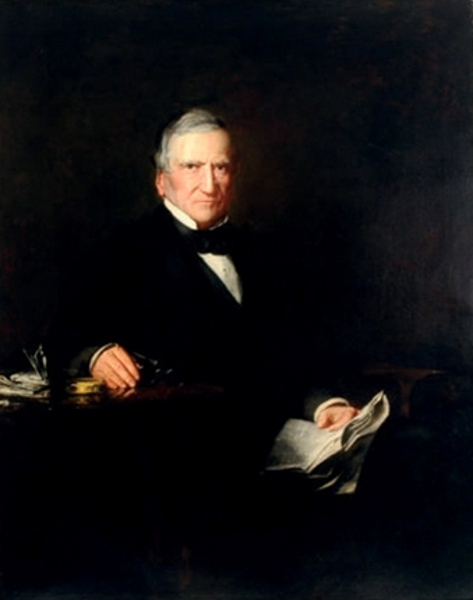
General Thomas McCall Cadwalader, by Susan Macdowell Eakins (1882)

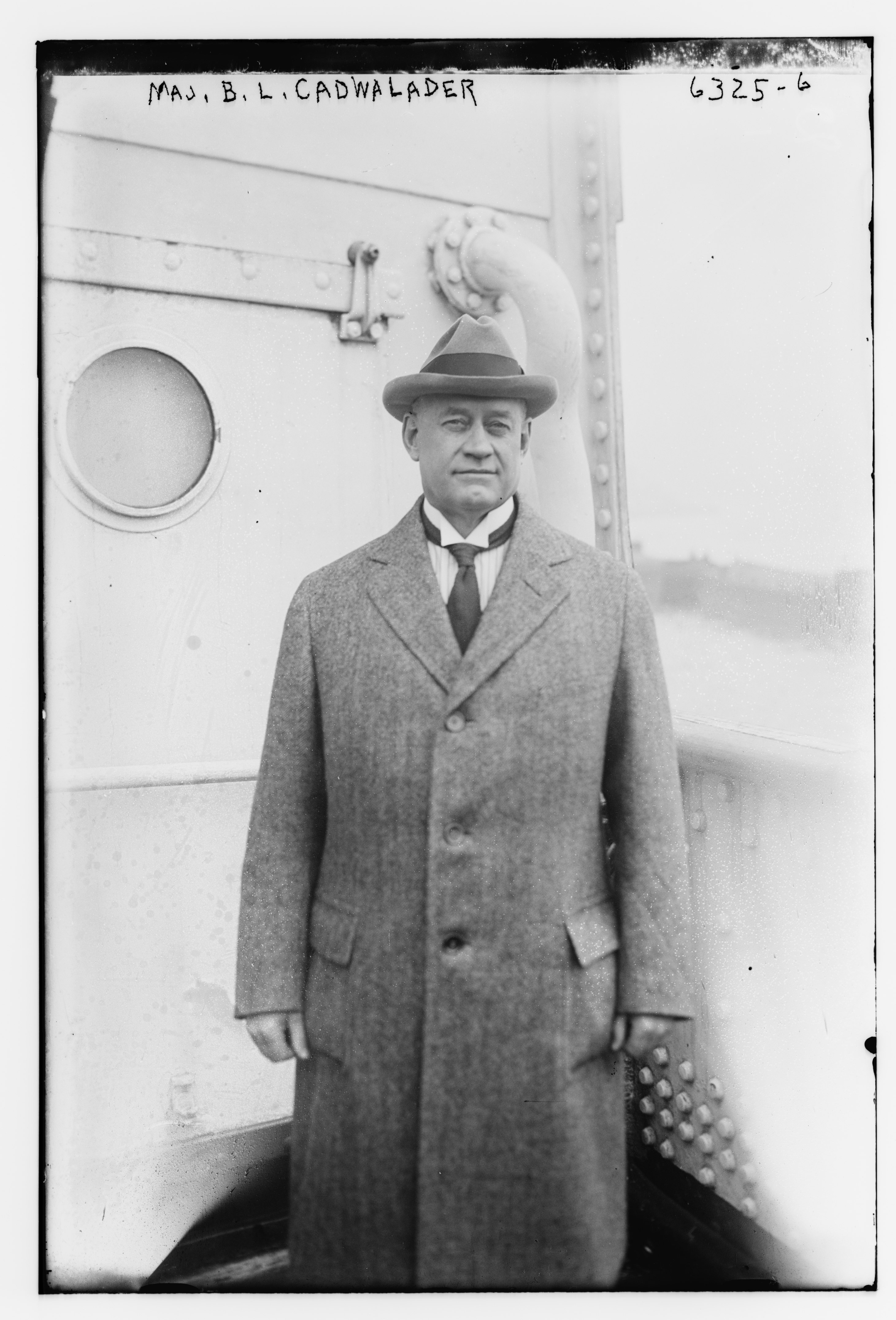
Maj. Bertram L. Cadwalader (1900)

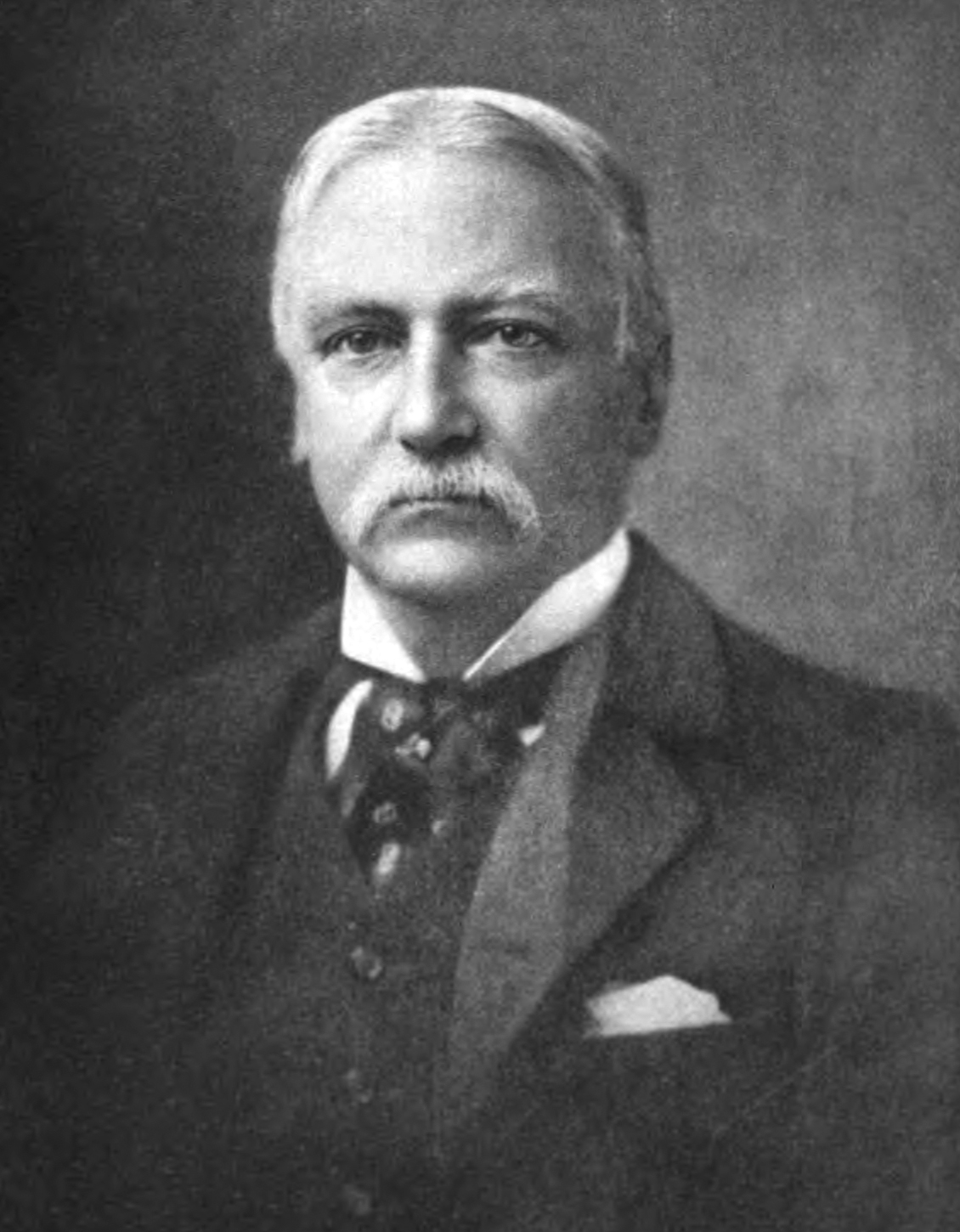
John Lambert Cadwalader (c. 1914)

== See also ==
- Cadwalader Park
- SS John Cadwalader
- Cadwalader, Wickersham & Taft
- Baron Erskine

Cadwalader family tree

John Cadwalader (1677–1734)	Martha Jones (1679–1747)
Thomas Cadwalader (1708–1779)	Hannah Lambert
Elizabeth Lloyd (1742–1776)	John Cadwalader (1742–1786)	Williamina Bond (1753–1837)	Lambert Cadwalader (1742–1823)	Mary McCall (1764–1848)
Archibald McCall (1767–1843)	Elizabeth Cadwalader (1774–1824)	Maria Cadwalader (1776–1811)	Samuel Ringgold (1770–1829)	Thomas Cadwalader (1779–1841)	Thomas McCall Cadwalader (1795–1873)	Maria Charlotte Gouverneur (1801–1867)
George Archibald McCall (1802–1868)	Samuel Ringgold (1796–1846)	Cadwalader Ringgold (1802–1867)	John Cadwalader (1805–1879)	George Cadwalader (1806–1879)	John Lambert Cadwalader (1836–1914)
Mary Binney Cadwalader (1829–1861)	William Henry Rawle (1823–1889)	Emily Cadwalader (1834–1892)
Frederic Rhinelander Jones (1846–1918)	Mary Cadwalader Rawle (1850–1923)
Beatrix Cadwalader Jones (1872–1959)	Max Farrand (1869–1945)

Notes:
- "Cadwalader Family Papers" (PDF). Collection 1454. Historical Society of Pennsylvania. 2007.
