= John Erskine, 4th Baron Erskine =

John Cadwalader Erskine, 4th Baron Erskine (1804 – 28 March 1882) was a British diplomat and peer.

== Early life ==
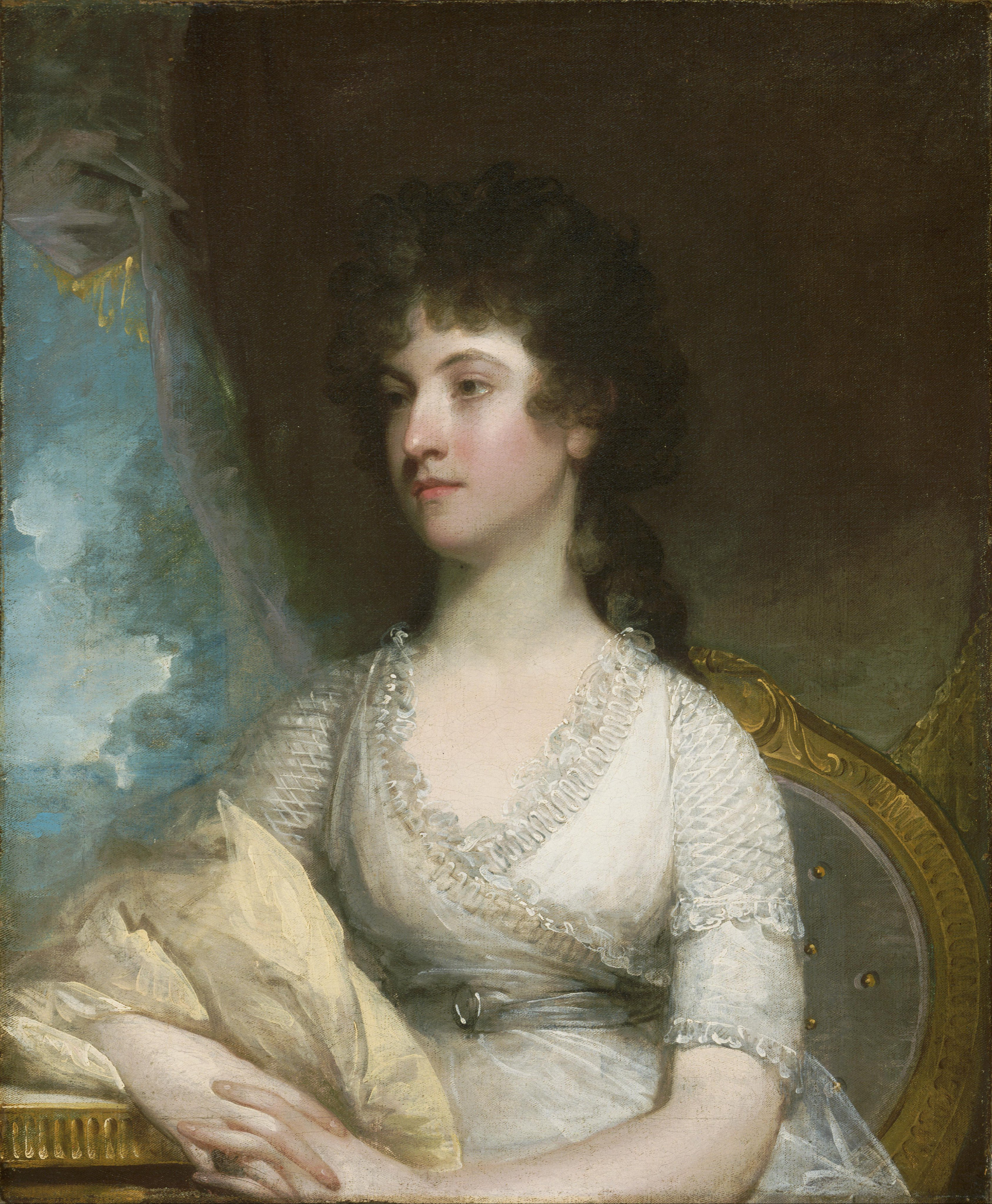
Portrait of his mother, Lady Erskine, by Gilbert Stuart

Erskine was born in 1804, as the second son of MP and diplomat David Erskine, 2nd Baron Erskine and, his first wife, Frances Cadwalader (1781–1843). Among his siblings were Thomas Americus Erskine (also a diplomat); Steuarta Erskine (who married Timothy Yeats Brown); Elizabeth Erskine (who married Sir St Vincent Hawkins-Whitshed, 2nd Baronet); David Montagu Erskine (a Lt.-Col. in the British Army); Edward Morris Erskine (also a diplomat); James Stuart Erskine (who was created Freiherr von Erskine by Ludwig II of Bavaria); Sevilla Erskine (who married Sir Henry Howard); Jane Plumer Erskine (who married James Callander of Craigforth and Ardkinglas); and Mary Erskine (who married Graf Hermann von Paumgarten).

His paternal grandparents were Thomas Erskine, 1st Baron Erskine (himself a fourth son of Henry Erskine, 10th Earl of Buchan) and the former Frances Moore (a daughter of Daniel Moore). His maternal grandparents were John Cadwalader, an American general during the Revolutionary War, and his second wife, Williamina Bond (a daughter of Dr. Phineas Bond, of Philadelphia and niece of Dr. Thomas Bond).

== Career ==
Erskine was a member of the East India Company's Civil Service and had served as a Judge and Superintendent of Police in the Cis-Sutlej states.

Upon the death of his elder brother in 1877, he succeeded to the title, 4th Baron Erskine, of Restormel Castle in the County of Cornwall, which had been created for his grandfather on 10 February 1806.

== Personal life ==
On 30 April 1829, he married Margaret Martyn, a daughter of John Martyn of County Tyrone, Ireland. She died on 21 June 1862.

After her death, he married Maria Louisa Cullen Campbell, a daughter of Col. Alexander Campbell, on 25 January 1865 at Shinfield, Berkshire. Together, they were the parents of:

- Hon. Fanny Macnaghten Erskine (d. 1872), who married Standish G, Rowley, of Sylvan Park, in 1861.
- Hon. Margaret Catherine Erskine (d. 1940), who married the Rev. Evelyn Henry Villebois Burnaby, Rector of Burrough-on-the-Hill, second son of Rev. Canon Gustavus Andrew Burnaby, of Somerby Hall and brother to Col. Frederick Burnaby, in 1878. They divorced in 1886 and she married Sydney Beaumont Willoughby, fourth son of Rev. Hon. Percival George Willoughby, Rector of Durweston-cum-Bryanston, and brother of Henry Willoughby, 8th Baron Middleton, in 1887.
- William Macnaghten Erskine, 5th Baron Erskine (1841–1913), who married Caroline Alice Martha Grimble, a daughter of William Grimble.

Lord Erskine died on 28 March 1882 at Ettenheim House in Torquay, Devon and was succeeded in the barony by his son, William. His widow married Philip Henry Egerton, son of William Egerton, in 1886.

Peerage of the United Kingdom
Preceded by Thomas Americus Erskine	Baron Erskine; 1877–1882	Succeeded by William Macnaghten Erskine
