= Thomas Erskine, 3rd Baron Erskine =

Thomas Americus Erskine, 3rd Baron Erskine (3 May 1802 – 10 May 1877) was a British diplomat and peer.

== Early life ==
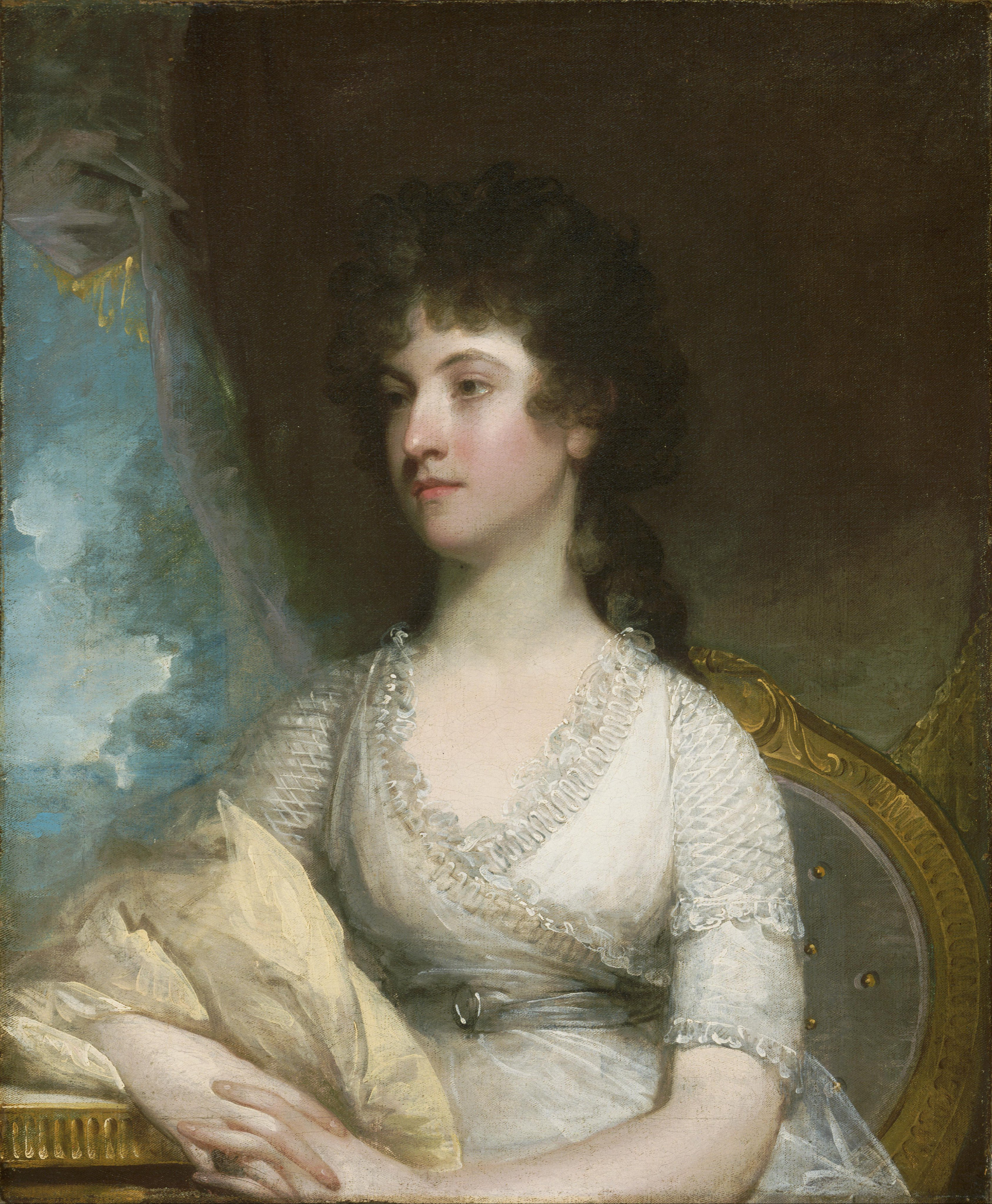
Portrait of his mother, Lady Erskine, by Gilbert Stuart

Erskine was born on 3 May 1802. He was the eldest son of MP and diplomat David Erskine, 2nd Baron Erskine and, his first wife, Frances Cadwalader (1781–1843). Among his siblings were John Cadwalader Erskine (also a diplomat); Steuarta Erskine (who married Timothy Yeats Brown); Elizabeth Erskine (who married Sir St Vincent Hawkins-Whitshed, 2nd Baronet); David Montagu Erskine (a Lt.-Col. in the British Army); Edward Morris Erskine (also a diplomat); James Stuart Erskine (who was created Freiherr von Erskine by Ludwig II of Bavaria); Sevilla Erskine (who married Sir Henry Howard); Jane Plumer Erskine (who married James Callander of Craigforth and Ardkinglas); and Mary Erskine (who married Graf Hermann von Paumgarten).

His paternal grandparents were Thomas Erskine, 1st Baron Erskine (himself a fourth son of Henry Erskine, 10th Earl of Buchan) and the former Frances Moore (a daughter of Daniel Moore). His maternal grandparents were John Cadwalader, an American general during the Revolutionary War, and his second wife, Williamina Bond (a daughter of Dr. Phineas Bond, of Philadelphia and niece of Dr. Thomas Bond).

== Career ==
He was educated at Harrow and at the University of Edinburgh. Erskine served as attaché to the British legation at Turin, Naples and Lisbon from 1824 to 1827.

Upon the death of his father on 19 March 1855, he succeeded to the title, 3rd Baron Erskine, of Restormel Castle in the County of Cornwall, which had been created for his grandfather on 10 February 1806.

== Personal life ==
On 12 May 1830, he married Louisa (née Newnham) Legh (c. 1791–1867). Louisa, the widow of Thomas Legh, of Adlington, was a daughter of George Lewis Newnham of Newtimber Place, and Mary Diana Aston (only daughter of Sir William Aston, of Lincoln's Inn Fields).

Lady Erskine died at Hillside, Alderley Edge, Cheshire on 10 March 1867. Lord Erskine died on 10 May 1877. As he was without issue, he was succeeded in the barony by his brother, John.

Peerage of the United Kingdom
Preceded by David Montagu Erskine	Baron Erskine; 1855–1877	Succeeded by John Cadwalader Erskine
