= Francis James Jackson =

British diplomat

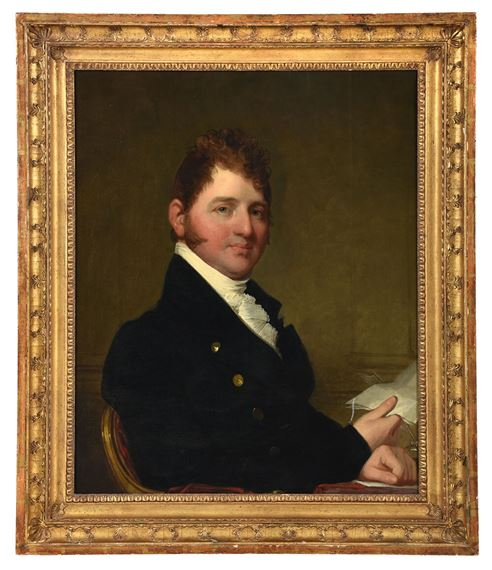
- portrait by Gilbert Stuart, 1810
- Born: December 1770
- Died: 5 August 1814 (aged 43–44)
- Occupation: Diplomat
- Employer: Foreign Office
- Parent(s): Thomas Jackson
- Relatives: George Jackson
- Position held: ambassador of the United Kingdom to Turkey (1796–1799), ambassador of the United Kingdom to France (1801–1802), ambassador of the United Kingdom of Great Britain and Ireland to the United States (1809–1810), ambassador of the United Kingdom of Great Britain and Ireland to Prussia (1802–1806)

Francis James Jackson (December 1770 – 5 August 1814) was a British diplomat, ambassador to the Ottoman Empire, Prussia and the United States.

== Career ==
Francis Jackson entered the diplomatic service aged only 16 and served as a Foreign Office clerk. In April 1788 he brought back from The Hague the signed copy of "a treaty of defensive alliance between His Majesty and the States General of the United Provinces" which was signed on 15 April. This treaty and a subsequent alliance with Prussia in August 1788 created a "Triple Alliance" against Russia which, however, lasted only until 1791.

In 1789 Jackson was appointed Secretary to the British legation in Berlin. He later held a similar post in Madrid where he acted as Minister (head of mission) ad interim after the departure of Lord St Helens in 1794 until the arrival of the Marquess of Bute in 1795 (because Lord Yarmouth, who should have succeeded St Helens, did not go). Jackson was then appointed ambassador to the Ottoman Porte in 1796. In November 1801 Marquess Cornwallis was sent to France to finalise peace terms: the negotiations took place at Amiens, and resulted in the Treaty of Amiens signed on 25 March 1802. Cornwallis took with him to Amiens the secretary to the embassy in Paris, Anthony Merry, and Jackson was sent to take Merry's place ad interim with the rank of minister-plenipotentiary. In October 1802 he moved on to be Envoy Extraordinary and Minister Plenipotentiary to Prussia in Berlin, where he stayed until 1806 when Prussia was defeated in the War of the Fourth Coalition. In 1807 he was sent on a special mission to Denmark where he witnessed the bombardment of Copenhagen.

In 1809 Jackson was sent to Washington, D.C., as Envoy Extraordinary and Minister Plenipotentiary after the recall of David Erskine when the British government refused to ratify Erskine's attempt to resolve the difficulties following a conflict between HMS Leopard and the US frigate Chesapeake (the Chesapeake–Leopard affair). Jackson remained at Washington until 1811. He died at Brighton, after a long illness, in 1814. The Morning Post reported his death thus:

On Friday evening died at Brighton, in the 44th year of his age, Francis James Jackson, Esq., late his Majesty's Envoy Extraordinary and Minister Plenipotentiary to the United States of America.
Mr Jackson had the honour of serving his Majesty and his country from the early age of 16. In the course of his professional life he was appointed Ambassador to the Ottoman Porte, and Accredited Minister to the Courts of Madrid and Berlin. At the latter place he married and resided, until the cessation of intercourse between the two kingdoms of great Britain and Prussia, in 1806. He was also employed in various temporary missions of great importance to Vienna, Paris and Copenhagen. This long and honourable career of public service, under different Administrations, abundantly proves that the confidence of his Sovereign was justly placed, and bears ample testimony to his diplomatic talents, his private life, his domestic and affectionate habits, and his virtues as a son, a brother, a husband, a father, and a friend, will never be obliterated from the memory of his relatives and connections.
– "Mr Jackson", The Morning Post, London, 11 August 1814

Diplomatic posts
Preceded by Lord St Helens	Minister ad interim at Madrid; 1794–1795	Succeeded by Marquess of Bute
Preceded by Sir Robert Liston	Ambassador to the Ottoman Porte; 1796–1799	Succeeded by Thomas Bruce, 7th Earl of Elgin
Preceded by no representation due to the French Revolutionary Wars	Minister Plenipotentiary ad interim at Paris; 1801–1802	Succeeded by Lord Whitworth
Preceded by John Proby, 1st Earl of Carysfort	Envoy Extraordinary and Minister Plenipotentiary to the Court of Berlin; 1802–1806	Succeeded by no representation due to occupation by France
Preceded by Hon. David Erskine	Envoy Extraordinary and Minister Plenipotentiary to the United States of America; 1809–1811	Succeeded by Sir Augustus Foster
