= James Erskine, 7th Earl of Buchan =

7th Earl of Buchan

James Erskine, 7th Earl of Buchan (d. 1664) was a Scottish landowner and peer.

James Erskine was the son of James Erskine, 6th Earl of Buchan and Mary Douglas, 6th Countess of Buchan. Mary died in 1628 and James Erskine inherited the Earldom. His father lived until 1640.

James Erskine, 7th Earl died in 1664 and William Erskine, 8th Earl of Buchan inherited the earldom.

Preceded by Mary Douglas, 6th Countess of Buchan; James Erskine, 6th Earl of Buchan	Earl of Buchan; 1628–1664	Succeeded by William Erskine, 8th Earl of Buchan
