= David Erskine, 9th Earl of Buchan =

Scottish peer

David Erskine, 9th Earl of Buchan, 4th Lord Cardross, PC (3 January 1672 – 14 October 1745) was a Scottish peer. He was the son of Henry Erskine, 3rd Lord Cardross, by Catherine, daughter of Sir James Stewart of Kirkhill. He was styled Master of Cardross and then Lord Cardross until 1695 whereupon he claimed Earldom of Buchan.

Lord Buchan was appointed a Privy Counsellor by King William in 1697. He was, between 1702 and 1714, the governor of Blackness Castle. He was Lord Lieutenant of Selkirkshire and of Clackmannanshire. Due to his opposition of the 1707 Act of Union, he lost prominence and was removed from his several offices of state.

Although a kinsman of the Earl of Mar, a prominent Jacobite statesman, Buchan was a supporter of the Hanoverian cause during the various Jacobite risings. He joined the Duke of Argyll during the suppression of the 1715 rising. After the aforementioned rising, he sat in the House of Lords as a Scottish representative peer between 1715 and 1734.

In 1697, Lord Buchan married Frances, the daughter and heiress of Henry Fairfax (grandson of the 1st Viscount Fairfax of Emley), Esq. of Hurst, Berkshire, and had issue, including Henry David Erskine, 10th Earl of Buchan. After Lady Buchan's death in 1719 he remarried to Isabella Blackett, daughter of Sir William Blackett, 1st Baronet; without issue.

== See also ==
- Earl of Buchan
- Earl of Mar
