= Alexander Stewart, 2nd Earl of Buchan =

Scottish nobleman (died 1505)

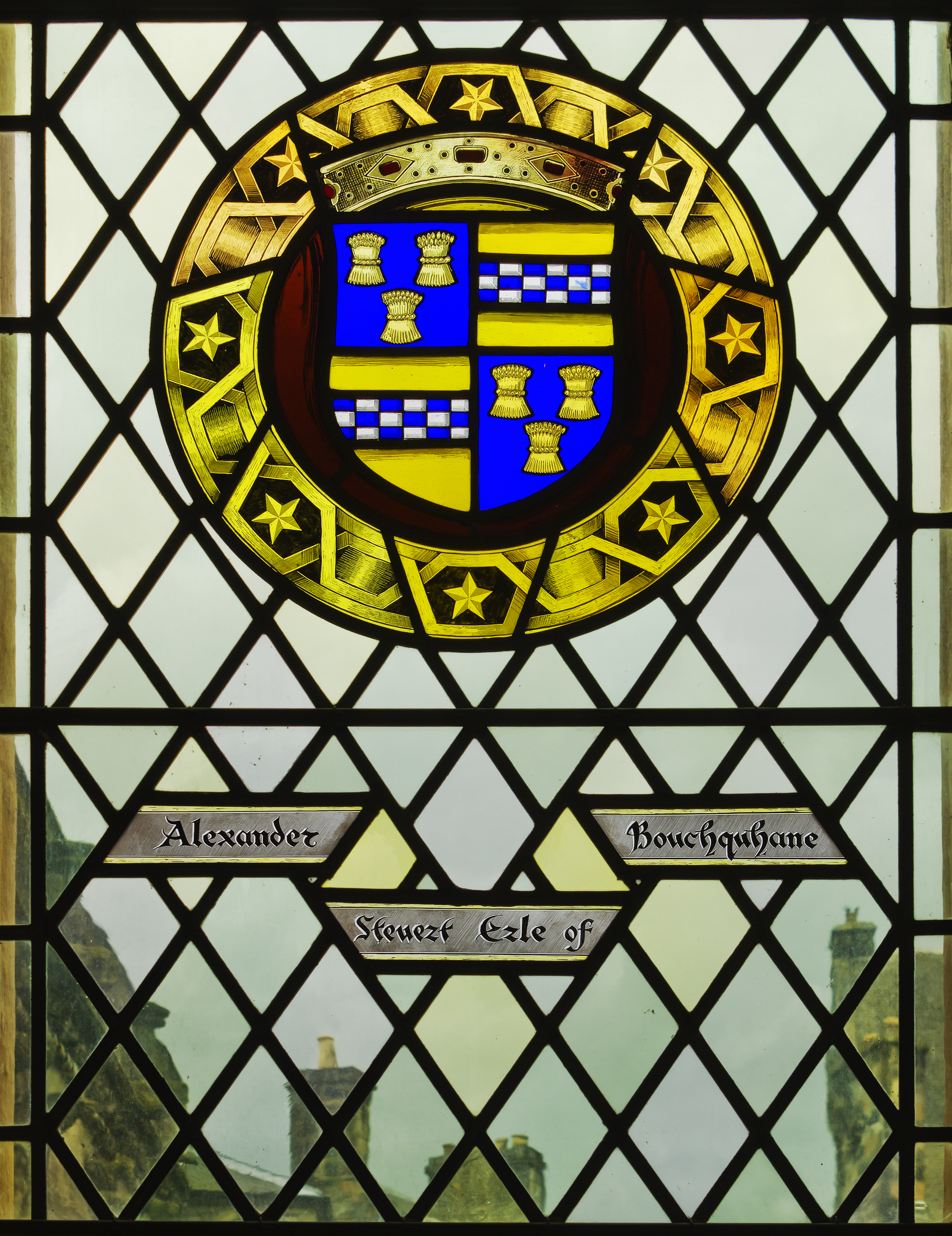
Arms of Alexander Stewart, Earl of Buchan, on stained glass window, Great Hall, Stirling Castle

Alexander Stewart, 2nd Earl of Buchan (died 1505) was the only son of James Stewart, 1st Earl of Buchan, and Margaret Ogilvy, the heiress of Sir Alexander Ogilvy of Auchterhouse. Alexander succeeded to the Earldom and the Barony of Kingedward and other lands, probably in 1499, as he got sasine of the Earldom on 23 January 1499/1500.

On 21 January 1490/1491 he was granted from his father a Charter to himself and his first wife, Isobel Ogilvy, of the lands of the Barony of Kettins and others; and on 6 February 1499/1500, another of the same lands to himself and his second wife, Margaret Ruthven.

By his first wife, Isobel Ogilvy, who was alive in 1491, but dead before his accession to the Earldom, he seems to have had no family.

By his second wife, Margaret, daughter of William Ruthven, first Lord Ruthven, he had issue:

- John Stewart, born about 1498, his successor.
- - a son, born early in 1500/1501. King James IV was at his baptism in Perth in February.
- Agnes Stewart.
- Janet Stewart.

The Earl died in 1505.

His second wife survived him, and was married, secondly, before 21 June 1508, to Sir John Erskine, younger of Dun, who fell at the Battle of Flodden; thirdly, before 23 December 1518, to James Stewart of Ryland; and fourthly, to William Wood of Bonyton. She died in 1548.

Peerage of Scotland
| Preceded by James Stewart | Earl of Buchan; 1499–1505 | Succeeded by John Stewart |
