= Henry Erskine, 3rd Lord Cardross =

Scottish peer and covenanter

Henry Erskine, third Lord Cardross (1650 – 1693), was a Scottish peer and covenanter.

== Background ==
Erskine was the eldest son of David Erskine, 2nd Lord Cardross, by his first wife, Anne, who was fifth daughter of Sir Thomas Hope, king's advocate. The title of Lord Cardross was originally conferred on the first Earl of Mar, and, in accordance with the right with which he was invested of conferring it on any of his heirs male, it was granted by him to his second son Henry, along with the barony of Cardross. By his father young Erskine had been educated in the principles of the Covenanters, and at an early period distinguished himself by his opposition to the administration of Lauderdale and the official Church of Scotland. In this he was strongly supported by his wife, Catherine, youngest of the two daughters and coheiresses of Sir William Stewart of Kirkhill.

On account of his wife's determination to have a Presbyterian chaplain to perform worship in her own house, he was fined 4,000l. of which he paid 1,000l. After an attempt to obtain a remission for the rest of the fine he was, on 5 August 1675, committed to the prison of Edinburgh, where he remained for four years. During his absence in Edinburgh, illegal conventicle meetings were being held near Cardross. A party of guards in search of a covenanter named John King entered Cardross' house at midnight, broke into his chests, and after acting with great rudeness towards his wife, placed a guard on it.

== Complaints to the King ==
The officials complained that the conventicles had Cardross' encouragement; this was the chief cause why his fine was not relaxed. On 7 Aug. 1677, while still in prison, he was fined 3,000l. for permitting one of his children to be christened by unlicensed ministers. In 1679 the king's forces in their march westwards went two miles out of their way to quarter on his estates of Kirkhill and Uphall, West Lothian.

Cardross obtained his release from prison in July 1679, on giving bond for the amount of his fine, and early next year went to London, where he laid before the king a narrative of the sufferings to which he had been exposed. This proceeding gave great offense to the Scottish privy council, who sent a letter to the king accusing Cardross of misrepresentation, the result being that all redress was denied him.

At this point he emigrated to North America. He established a plantation at Charlestown Neck, South Carolina. On 28 October 1685 his estate in Scotland was exposed to sale by public roup, and was bought by the Earl of Mar at seventeen years' purchase. Cardross was driven from the settlement in Carolina by the Spaniards. He went to Holland, and in 1688 he accompanied the Prince of Orange to England. His son David was an officer in the same army.

In the following year he raised a regiment of dragoons and served under General Mackay against Dundee. An act was passed restoring him to his estates. He was also sworn a privy councilor and constituted general of the mint. In July 1689 the Duke of Hamilton, the king's commissioner, at a meeting of the council, fell 'with great violence' on Lord Cardross, asserting that it was by his dragoons that the episcopal minister of Logie had been prevented from entering his church; but Cardross denied all knowledge of anything asserted to have happened.

== Service of the King ==
Cardross was engaged in the Battle of Killiecrankie, of which he sent an account to Lord Melville in a letter of 30 July. When the Duke of Hamilton proposed a new oath to the council, Cardross objected to it as contrary to the instrument of government, and also 'because the maner of swering by the Bible is nether the Scottish nor the Presbiterian forme, and seems to raise the Bible as more than God'. In the instructions sent by King William on 18 December 1689 to 'model three troops of dragoons,’ Cardross was proposed as lieutenant-colonel and captain of the first troop. In 1690 he was appointed one of a commission to examine into the condition of the universities. In October 1691 he went to London along with the Earl of Crawford to support the proceedings of the Scotch council against the episcopalians.

He died at Edinburgh on 21 May 1693. His eldest son, David Erskine, 4th Lord Cardross, succeeded to the earldom of Buchan in 1695.

== Family ==
He was married to Catherine Stewart and they had four sons and three daughters.

His granddaughter Katherine Erskine, married Gilbert Laurie of Polmont (1729–1809), twice Lord Provost of Edinburgh.
