= Thomas Bond (American physician) =

American physician

Thomas Bond, MD
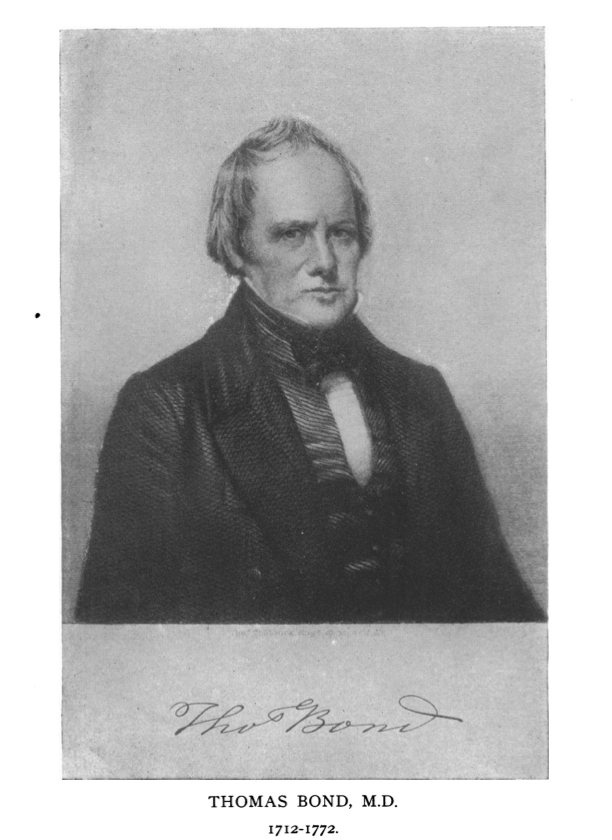

Founder, Pennsylvania Hospital

Founding Member, American Philosophical Society
- In office 1743–1784

Vice President, American Philosophical Society
- In office 1767–1768

Personal details
- Born: May 2, 1713 Calvert County, Province of Maryland, British America
- Died: March 26, 1784 (aged 70) Philadelphia, Pennsylvania, United States
- Spouses: Susannah Roberts (m. 1735; died 1737) Sarah Weyman (m. 1742; died 1784)
- Children: Thomas Bond, Jr; Richard Bond; Venables Bond
- Parent(s): Richard Bond; Elizabeth Benson Chew

Thomas Bond (May 2, 1713 – March 26, 1784) was an American physician and surgeon. In 1751 he co-founded the Pennsylvania Hospital, the first medical facility in the American colonies, with Benjamin Franklin, and also volunteered his services there as both physician and teacher.

== Education and professional life ==
Thomas Bond was born in Calvert County, Maryland, the son of Richard Bond and Elizabeth Chew. After studying medicine with Dr. Alexander Hamilton in Annapolis, he traveled to Europe to complete his medical education, mainly in Paris. Dr. Bond then moved to Philadelphia where he practiced medicine for 50 years. In 1743, he helped his long-time friend Benjamin Franklin establish the American Philosophical Society. Having formed a favorable opinion of British hospitals in the course of his studies, Bond began trying to raise funds in 1750 to establish a place of care for both the sick and the mentally ill, particularly for the poor. Unable to raise the funds himself, he turned to his friend Franklin, who had more success. Together they co-founded the Pennsylvania Hospital, which is located on Eighth and Pine Streets in Philadelphia.

The hospital quickly drew attention as a center for medical advancement, especially in maternity care and the humane treatment of mental illness, a poorly understood area of medicine at the time. Bond volunteered his services as a surgeon at this facility for more than three decades, from the year of its founding until he died. Some years after the hospital opened, he was joined there by his younger brother, Phineas Bond, who was also a skilled physician. Phineas Bond (c. 1717–16.VI.1773) matriculated at the University of Leyden in the Netherlands 13 Augustus 1742.

Thomas Bond earned a high reputation as a surgeon, especially for amputations and bladder stone operations. Many patients traveled considerable distances (from as far away as Boston) to avail themselves of his surgical care. He performed the first lithotomy in the United States at Pennsylvania Hospital in October 1756 and developed a splint for fractures of the lower arm, known as a "Bond splint." In 1737, he was also one of seven physicians to publicly recommend inoculation against smallpox. Thomas Bond also served as trustee of the University of Pennsylvania, where, in 1766, he began clinical lectures for the benefit of medical students. These formal lectures supplemented the bedside clinical instruction he conducted in the hospital. For his learning and pedagogy, he earned the title, "Father of Clinical Medicine." The alumni association of the Pennsylvania Hospital is today known as the Thomas Bond Society.

== Service during the Revolutionary War ==
When the American Revolutionary War broke out, the sixty-three-year-old doctor, along with his son, helped to organize the medical department of the Continental Army. He established the first American field hospitals during the conflict. He was also a member of the local Committee of Safety during the war. He served as personal physician to Deborah Read, Benjamin Franklin's wife, and attended her during her final illness while Franklin was in England.

== Personal life ==
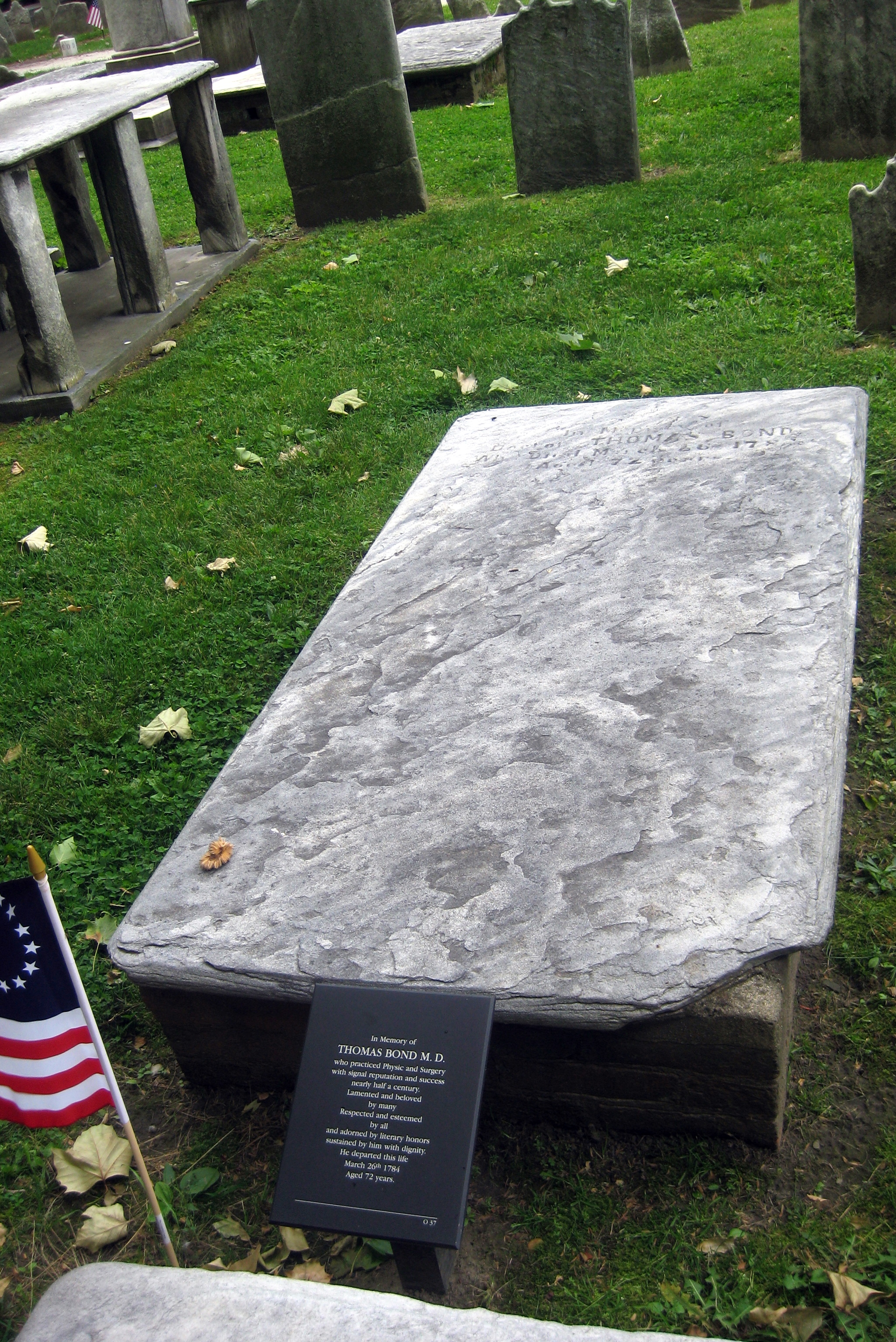
Thomas Bond gravestone epitaph in Christ Church Burial Ground, Philadelphia

Thomas Bond was a Quaker. His first wife, Susannah Roberts, was the daughter of Edward Roberts, the mayor of Philadelphia. They married in 1735, and with her he had two children. He remarried after her early death and had seven children by Sarah Weyman, among whom was another Thomas Bond. He is buried in Christ Church Burial Ground in Philadelphia. His epitaph reads: "In Memory of Thomas Bond, MD who practiced Physic and Surgery with signal reputation and success nearly half a century. Lamented and beloved by many, respected and esteemed by all, and adorned by literary honors sustained by him with dignity."
