= John Stewart, 3rd Earl of Buchan =

Scottish nobleman

John Stewart, 3rd Earl of Buchan (c. 1498 – c. 1551) was a Scottish nobleman.

He was the son and heir of Alexander Stewart and succeeded to the Earldom in 1505, however, he retained the style of Master of Buchan until 1519, when he was formally recognised as heir. On 4 August 1547, he formally resigned his land to his son John Stewart and his heirs, reserving the Earl's liferent.

He married Margaret, daughter of Sir James Scrymgeour of Dudhope, Constable of Dundee, by whom he had:

- John Stewart, Master of Buchan, who married, first, Mary, only child of James Stewart, 1st Earl of Moray, an illegitimate son of King James IV and Janet Kennedy; secondly, Margaret, daughter of Walter Ogilvy of the Boyne, who survived her husband by two years at least. He was killed in the Battle of Pinkie Cleugh, 10 September 1547, leaving an only child by Margaret Ogilvy,
  - Christina Stewart, later to become Countess of Buchan.
- James Stewart, Master of Buchan in 1547, after his brother's death. He married Christian, daughter of John Strang of Balcaskie, by whom he had:
  - James Stewart, served as heir to his father, 13 October 1604, and to his grandfather, great-grandfather, and great-great-grandfather 26 March 1618.
  - Alexander Stewart.
  - Margaret Stewart, married to Sir Hadrian Damon of Birtewelte in Denmark.
  - Isobel Stewart.

He was described as recently dead in 1551. The earldom devolved upon his granddaughter Christina.

Peerage of Scotland
Preceded by Alexander Stewart	Earl of Buchan; 1505–1551	Succeeded by Christina Stewart
