= David Erskine, 2nd Baron Erskine =

British diplomat and politician (1776–1855)

The Right Honourable The Lord Erskine

British Minister to Bavaria
- In office 1828–1843
- Preceded by: Brook Taylor
- Succeeded by: John Milbanke

British Minister to Württemberg
- In office 1824–1828
- Preceded by: Henry Watkin Williams-Wynn
- Succeeded by: Edward Cromwell Disbrowe

British Minister to the United States
- In office 1807–1809
- Preceded by: Anthony Merry
- Succeeded by: Francis James Jackson

Member of Parliament for Portsmouth
- In office 1806–1806 Serving with John Markham
- Preceded by: Thomas Erskine; John Markham
- Succeeded by: John Markham; Sir Thomas Miller, Bt

Personal details
- Born: David Montagu Erskine; 12 August 1776
- Died: 19 March 1855 (aged 78) Butler's Green, Sussex
- Spouses: Frances Cadwalader (m. 1799; died 1843) Anne Travis (m. 1843; died 1851) Anna Graham Durham (m. 1852; died 1855)
- Relations: Henry Erskine, 10th Earl of Buchan (grandfather); Daniel Moore (grandfather)
- Children: 12, including Thomas, John, Edward, and Jane
- Parent(s): Thomas Erskine, 1st Baron Erskine; Frances Moore
- Education: Winchester College
- Alma mater: Trinity College, Cambridge

David Montagu Erskine, 2nd Baron Erskine (12 August 1776 – 19 March 1855) was a British diplomat and politician.

He served as Member of Parliament for Portsmouth in 1806 before being appointed Minister to the United States. Erskine was recalled in 1809 due to his resolution of the Chesapeake–Leopard Affair and remained out of favor until 1824 when he inherited his father's title. He later served as Minister to Stuttgart and Munich before retiring in 1843. Erskine married three times, with his first wife, Frances Cadwalader, bearing twelve children. He died in 1855 and was succeeded by his eldest son, Thomas.

== Early life ==
Erskine was born on 12 August 1776 into Clan Erskine. He was the eldest son of Thomas Erskine, 1st Baron Erskine (himself a fourth son of Henry Erskine, 10th Earl of Buchan) and the former Frances Moore (a daughter of Daniel Moore).

He was educated at Winchester and Trinity College, Cambridge, matriculating in 1796. He was called to the Bar of Lincoln's Inn in 1802.

== Career ==
Erskine did not practice law; instead he was elected as Member of Parliament for Portsmouth in 1806, in place of his father, who was appointed Lord Chancellor. At the request of Erskine's father to Charles James Fox, then Foreign Secretary, he was appointed Minister to the United States later that year.

In 1809, Erskine was recalled by the Foreign Secretary, George Canning, for having offered the withdrawal of the Orders in Council of 1807 against the Americans and his resolution of the Chesapeake–Leopard Affair. British historian Paul Langford looks at the decisions by the British government in 1809:

The British ambassador in Washington [Erskine] brought affairs almost to an accommodation, and was ultimately disappointed not by American intransigence but by one of the outstanding diplomatic blunders made by a Foreign Secretary. It was Canning who, in his most irresponsible manner and apparently out of sheer dislike of everything American, recalled the ambassador Erskine and wrecked the negotiations, a piece of most gratuitous folly. As a result, the possibility of a new embarrassment for Napoleon turned into the certainty of a much more serious one for his enemy. Though the British cabinet eventually made the necessary concessions on the score of the Orders-in-Council, in response to the pressures of industrial lobbying at home, its action came too late… The loss of the North American markets could have been a decisive blow. As it was by the time the United States declared war, the Continental System [of Napoleon] was beginning to crack, and the danger correspondingly diminishing. Even so, the war, inconclusive though it proved in a military sense, was an irksome and expensive embarrassment which British statesman could have done much more to avert.

Erskine remained out of favour and unemployed until 1824, when he inherited his father's title and was appointed Minister to Stuttgart. He subsequently transferred to Munich in 1828. He retired in 1843.

== Personal life ==
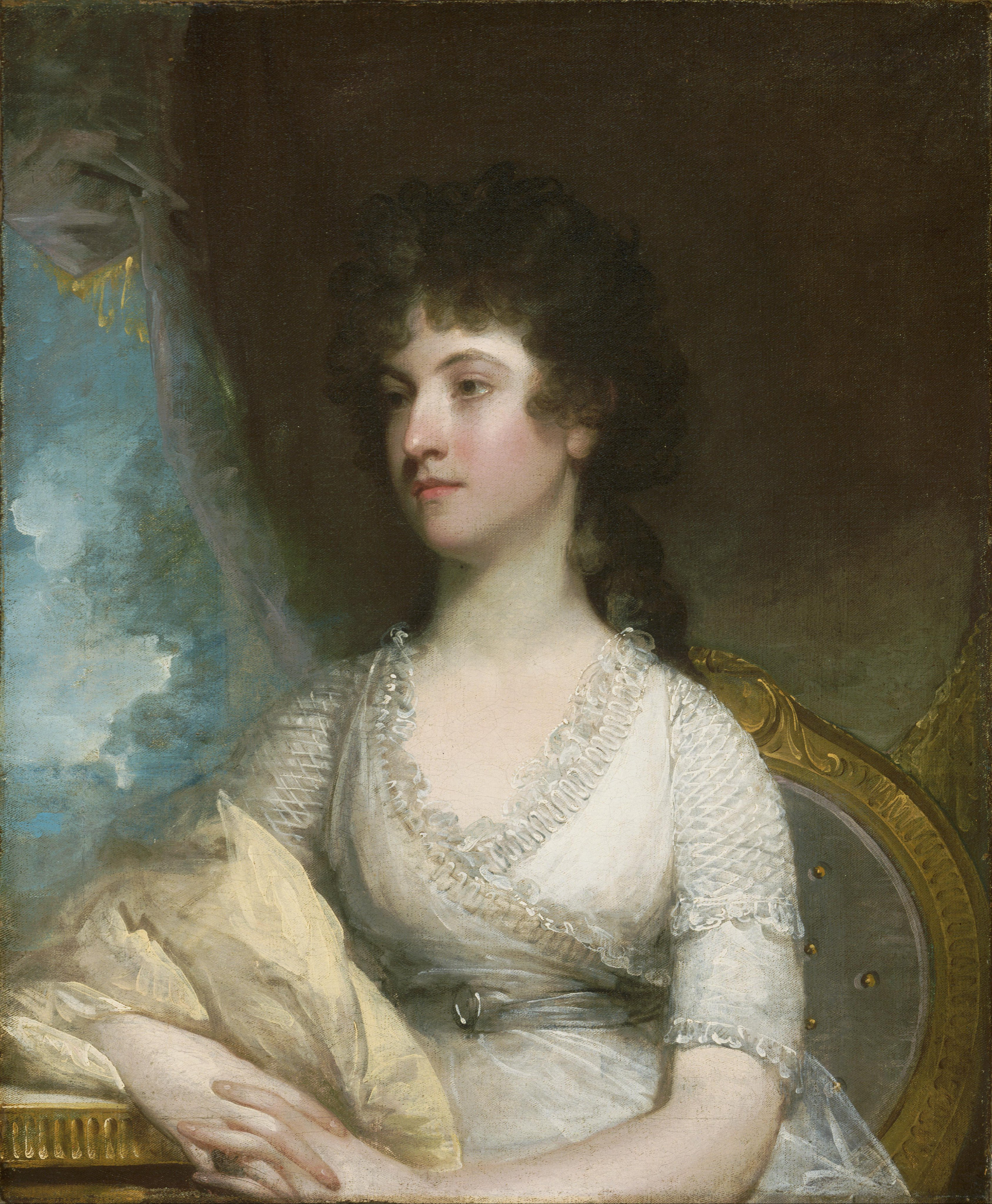
Portrait of Frances Cadwalader Montague, Lady Erskine by Gilbert Stuart

Lord Erskine had lived in the United States prior to his appointment as Minister to Washington. In 1799, he married as his first wife Frances Cadwalader (1781–1843), daughter of John Cadwalader, a general during the American Revolutionary War. She was the great-granddaughter of Judge William Moore, of Moore's Hall, Pennsylvania, whose niece married Lord Erskine's father, and hence Lord Erskine and his wife were cousins. A portrait of Lady Erskine was considered one of Gilbert Stuart's masterpieces. They had twelve children:

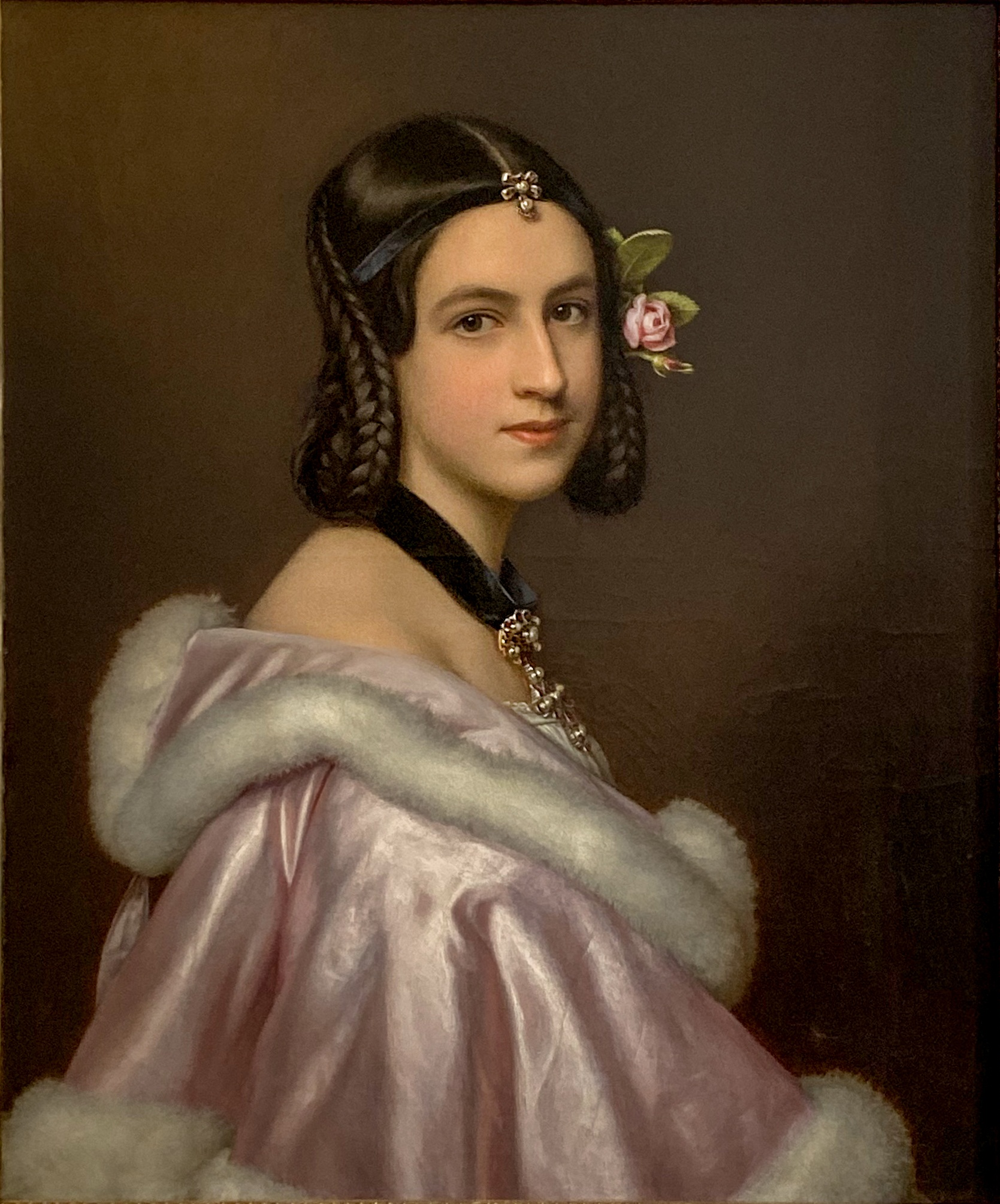
Portrait of Lord Erskine's daughter, Jane Erskine, by Joseph Karl Stieler in the Gallery of Beauties, c. 1838.

- Thomas Americus Erskine, later 3rd Baron Erskine (1802–1877), a diplomat.
- John Cadwalader Erskine, later 4th Baron Erskine (1804–1882), a diplomat.
- Steuarta Erskine (1810–1863), who married Timothy Yeats Brown.
- Elizabeth Erskine (c. 1812–1886), who married Sir St Vincent Hawkins-Whitshed, 2nd Baronet.
- David Montagu Erskine (1816–1903), a Lt.-Col.
- Edward Morris Erskine (1817–1883), a diplomat.
- James Stuart Erskine (1821–1904), who was created Freiherr von Erskine by Ludwig II of Bavaria.
- Frances Erskine (died 1876), who married Gabriel Shawe.
- Sevilla Erskine (died 1835), who married Sir Henry Howard.
- Harriett Erskine (died 1855), who married Charles Woodmass.
- Jane Plumer Erskine (died 1846), who married James Callander of Craigforth and Ardkinglas.
- Mary Erskine (died 1874), who married Graf Hermann von Paumgarten; their great-grandson, Graf Karl Theodor zu Törring-Jettenbach, married Princess Elizabeth of Greece and Denmark.

Thomas Americus was named after Thomas Cadwalader, Lady Erskine's brother, who became an officer during the War of 1812. John Cadwalader was named after her father. Lady Erskine died in Genoa in March 1843.

Erskine married as his second wife Anne Travis, daughter of John Travis, in July 1843. After Anne's death in April 1851, he married as his third wife Anna (née Graham) Durham, daughter of William Cunninghame Graham of Gartmore and Finlaystone and widow of Thomas Calderwood Durham, in 1852. There were no children from his second and third marriage.

Lord Erskine died at his home of Butler's Green in Sussex in March 1855, aged 78, and was buried at Cuckfield. He was succeeded in the barony by his eldest son, Thomas. His widow married the Venerable John Sandford, Archdeacon of Coventry, in 1856. She died on 26 March 1886.

== Notes ==
Parliament of the United Kingdom
Preceded by Thomas Erskine; John Markham	Member of Parliament for Portsmouth; 1806; With: John Markham	Succeeded by John Markham; Sir Thomas Miller, Bt
Diplomatic posts
Preceded by Anthony Merry	British Minister to the United States; 1807–1809	Succeeded by Francis James Jackson
Preceded by Henry Watkin Williams-Wynn	British Minister to Württemberg; 1824–1828	Succeeded by Edward Cromwell Disbrowe
Preceded by Brook Taylor	British Minister to Bavaria; 1828–1843	Succeeded by John Milbanke
Peerage of the United Kingdom
Preceded by Thomas Erskine	Baron Erskine; 1823–1855	Succeeded by Thomas Erskine
