= James Erskine, 6th Earl of Buchan =

James Erskine, 6th Earl of Buchan (died 1640), was the eldest son of John Erskine, Earl of Mar, by his second wife, Marie Stewart, daughter of Esme Stewart, Duke of Lennox.

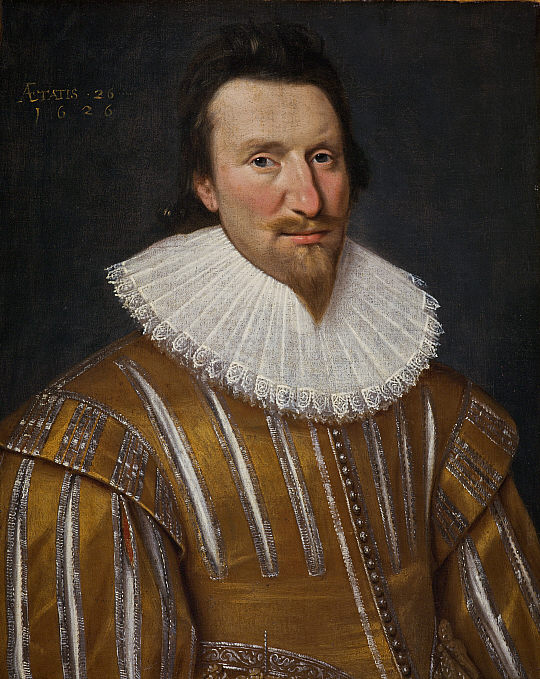
James Erskine, 6th Earl of Buchan (1626) by Adam de Colone

He married Mary Douglas, 6th Countess of Buchan, daughter and heiress of James Douglas, 5th Earl of Buchan, and assumed the title of Earl of Buchan. This title was confirmed by a royal charter, dated 22 March 1617, the countess resigning her rights in his favour, and he was allowed the possession and exercise of all honours, dignities, and precedence of former earls of Buchan. A decree of the court of session, 25 July 1628, restored to Buchan and his wife the precedency over the earls of Eglinton, Montrose, Cassilis, Caithness, and Glencairn, which had been claimed by them, and granted by a former decree in 1606. On the accession of Charles I, Buchan became one of the lords of the bedchamber.

He lived chiefly in London, where he died in 1640. He was buried at Auchterhouse, Forfarshire. His wife died before him in 1628. They left six children, two sons, James, who succeeded to the title, and John, and four daughters.
