= All Saints Catholic School, York =

Catholic comprehensive school and Sixth Form in York, England

All Saints Catholic School

Location
- Mill Mount Lane; Bar Convent (Lower) Site Mill Mount (Upper) Site; Yorkshire; South Bank, York, North Yorkshire, YO24 1BJ; England; 53.9513°N 1.0941°W

Information
- Former names: All Saints RC School, Bar Convent Grammar School, Bar Convent Girls School, St George's RC Secondary School, St Margaret Clitherow RC Secondary School
- Type: Comprehensive; Academy
- Motto: Fides Caritas Unitas (Faith Love Unity)
- Religious affiliation: Christianity
- Denomination: Catholic
- Established: 5 November 1686; 339 years ago
- Founders: Frances Bedingfield, Mary Ward
- Sister school: St Francis Xavier School, North Yorkshire
- Local authority: City of York
- Trust: Nicholas Postgate Catholic Academy Trust
- Department for Education URN: 149517 Tables
- Ofsted: Reports
- Head teacher: Sharon Keelan-Beardsley
- Staff: 135
- Years taught: Years 7–13
- Gender: Mixed
- Age: 11 to 18
- Enrolment: 1,406
- Capacity: 1,421
- Sixth form students: 500
- Schedule type: Biweekly timetable
- Campuses: Lower (Convent) Site; Upper (Mill Mount) Site; Sim Balk Sports Pavilion
- Campus type: Urban Split-Site
- Houses: Bernadette; Clitherow; Bosco; Kolbe; Romero; Teresa; Aloysius; De Porres; Francis
Colours
School Colours:
Trust Colours:
- Song: All Saints Fanfare; For All the Saints
- Nickname: Catholic Canaries
- Communities served: Catholic community of York and Yorkshire
- Feeder schools: All Saints Catholic Primary School – Thirsk; Barkston Ash Catholic Primary School – Barkston Ash; Our Lady Queen of Martyrs RC Primary School – York; Sacred Heart RC Primary School – Northallerton; St Aelred's RC Primary School – York; St Benedict's RC Primary School – Ampleforth; St George's RC Primary School – York; St John of Beverley RC School – Beverley; St Joseph's Catholic Primary School – Tadcaster; St Mary's RC Primary School – Malton; St Mary's RC Primary School – Market Weighton; St Mary & St Joseph's RC Primary School – Pocklington; St Wilfrid's RC Primary School – York
- Affiliation: Bar Convent
- Alumni name: Old Saintsians
- Demonym: All Saintsians
- Parish: English Martyrs Church, York
- Website: Official website Trust website
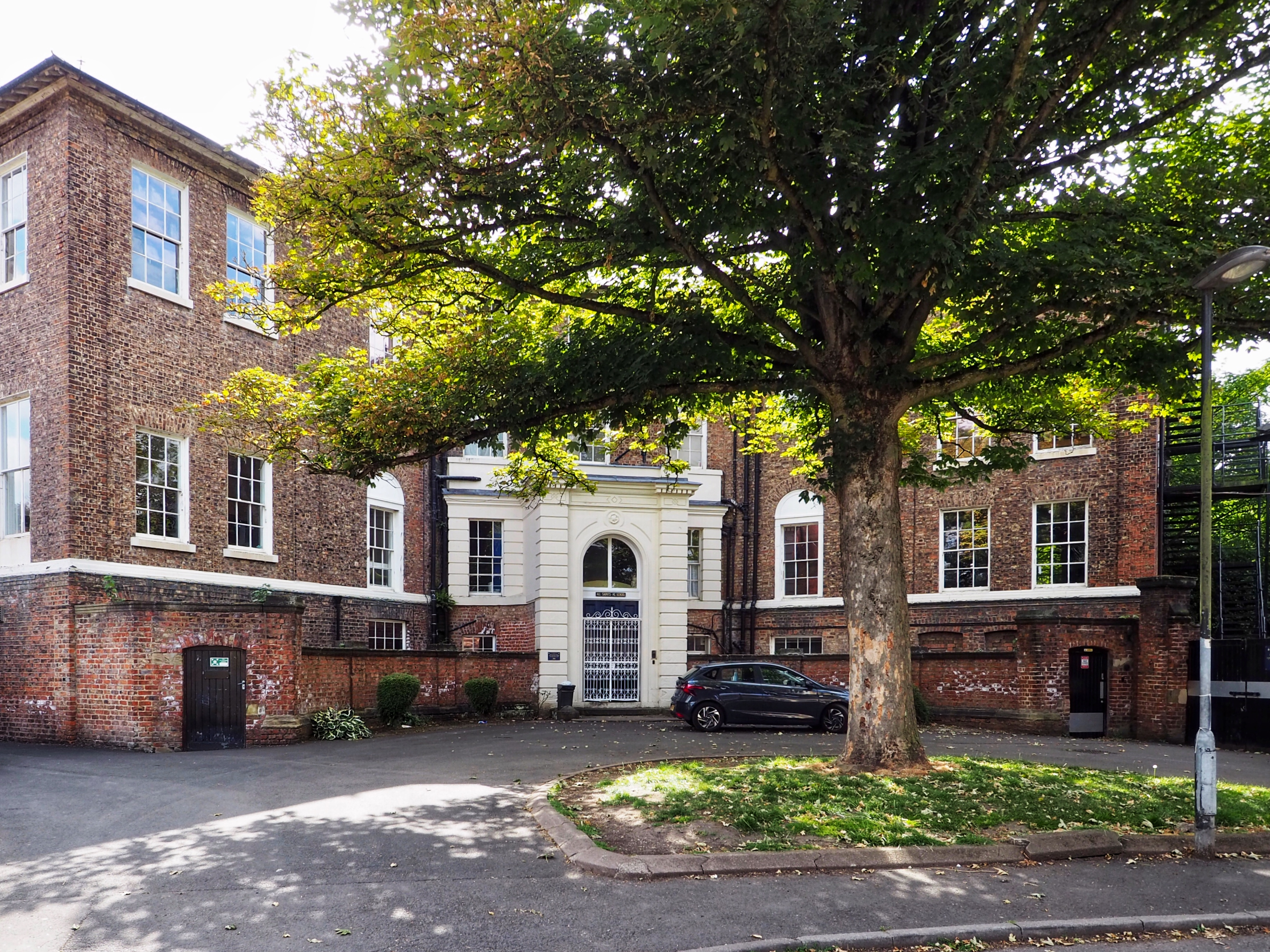
- Uppersite Mill Mount

Listed Building – Grade II*
- Official name: All Saints School
- Designated: 24 June 1983
- Reference no.: 1257280

All Saints Catholic School, York is a split site, coeducational comprehensive Catholic secondary school and sixth form. The school is regarded as the oldest Catholic school in England.

The school has a split site. The Upper Site is between South Bank and Scarcroft Road in the south side of York, England, and is where years 10–13 are taught. The Lower Site is on Nunnery Lane close to Micklegate Bar and is where years 7–9 are taught.

In 2022, it was announced that All Saints is the best school in York, fifth best School in the North.

The school has been serving the Catholic population of York and more broadly Yorkshire (in some form) since 1665, and plays a role in the Catholic education of the region as the only Catholic Secondary school and Sixth Form in York.

== Admissions ==
All Saints is a secondary school and sixth form (being the single largest Catholic school in the region) for children from the York and Yorkshire Catholic Parishes, however welcomes students from other faiths and belief backgrounds.

Traditional entry points are at the beginning of each Key Stage when form (re)attribution also takes place.

At Sixth Form, two-thirds of the student body is typically from other York secondary schools.

== History ==
=== Founding ===
Mary Ward, a nun from York, initiated a mission in to educate girls in the Catholic faith, with the aim of preserving Catholicism for future generations. She assumed leadership of the community and established convent-run schools on the Continent, where Catholicism was still legal. Following her death, the Sisterhood returned to York in 1686 and formalised a previous informal establishment Mary Ward had created. With the assistance of Thomas Gascoigne, a Yorkshire businessman who desired his daughters to receive a local Catholic education, the Bar Convent Girls School was founded. Gascoigne provided a £450 donation to set up the school. The school eventually became the first Roman Catholic institution to teach girls in the nation. The site was chosen because it lay beyond the city walls, beyond the reach of city authorities tasked with identifying and prosecuting Catholics.

During the 18th century the school had a lavish garden and small farm, where livestock was said to have been kept. Between 1766 and 1789, Thomas Atkinson designed and built a house frontage on Blossom Street and building a hidden domed chapel where in April 1769, the first Roman Catholic mass was celebrated in the school chapel. The strategically designed chapel includes eight exits for rapid escape during anti-Catholic raids. Renovations in the 21st century also revealed a priest hole, designed due to the death penalty Catholic Mass carried with it.

'no more than a boarding school for young ladies of Roman Catholic families'. – Drake describing the Convent and school in 1736

During the 1800s, an additional wing was added for a day school, as the school was growing.

The school soon became known as the oldest Catholic school in England, and also considered to be one of the best schools in the nation.

=== First World War ===
The school played a significant role in the war effort, notably establishing a military hospital in September 1914. The sisters' offered to establish a military hospital as early as September 1914, and by 16 October 1914, the hospital had been opened, situated in the newly constructed Concert Hall. It operated until late 1917, the hospital was managed by the teachers, supported by nurses from York County Hospital and numerous volunteers from the local VAD. Over three years, nearly 400 patients received treatment at this facility.

Bar Convent school, as it was then known, also accommodated nun and refugees from Belgium during this time, in the dormitories traditionally used by pupils.

In 1925, the Bar Convent School became a grammar school following the merger of the fee-paying boarding school and the day school, allowing locals to apply for scholarships.

=== Second World War ===
During the Baedeker raids of 1942, the school infirmary was bombed and destroyed in the Luftwaffe's bombing campaign. At the time, the school was being utilised as a military hospital, and medical equipment was installed in the school hall. Following the conclusion of the Second World War, the school's facilities were expanded, and an additional seven classrooms, a laboratory, a needlework room, and a dining room were constructed, effectively doubling the school's accommodation. 5 of the schools teachers were killed in the bombing.

=== Comprehensive Education ===
During the mid-1970s, the school began admitting boys in an attempt to fill the shortage of Catholic boys places in the city. In 1978, plans for the establishment of a new Catholic comprehensive school in York were submitted. The Bar Convent Grammar School, associated with the Institute of the Blessed Virgin Mary (IBVM), would be converted into the senior section of a new co-educational comprehensive school.

The nuns invested £102,000 to adapt the existing Bar Convent site for use as the senior section of the new comprehensive school. Their deep involvement was pivotal in shaping the school's transition, yet it also raised concerns about the integration of lay leadership and male students, given that the plan proposed a lay headteacher. The IBVM demonstrated its commitment to comprehensive education by relinquishing its direct grant status.

The reorganisation plan proposed a split-site arrangement, with the senior section at the Bar Convent and the junior section at St. Margaret Clitherow School. This plan faced criticism for logistical inefficiencies and limited space for expansion at the Bar Convent site. Critics argued that consolidating the school on a single site would have been more practical and sustainable in the long term. Nonetheless, supporters emphasized the historical significance and superior facilities of the Bar Convent, including its well-equipped science laboratories, as key assets.

A major point of contention was the proposed governance structure. The 18-member governing body would include representatives from the IBVM, Middlesbrough Diocese, Leeds Diocese, and Ampleforth Abbey, but it lacked representation from parents, teachers, and local community stakeholders. This exclusion contrasted with the recommendations of the Taylor Report, which advocated broader representation in school governance. While some critics pushed for greater lay involvement, the Middlesbrough Diocese maintained that the proposals adhered to existing regulations for voluntary schools and were not bound by the Taylor recommendations.

The transition to comprehensive education in York unfolded against a backdrop of conservatism among Catholic parents, many of whom preferred traditional grammar schools and threatened to pull their children out and send them to Archbishop Holgate's Grammar School or Nunthorpe, both however would change into comprehensives within the decade.

A settlement was reached in the early 1980s whereby the Bar Convent Grammar School was transferred from the IBVM Sisterhood to the Diocese of Middlesbrough. The school was reopened as All Saints Roman Catholic School in 1985, with the inclusion of pupils from St. George's and St Margaret Clitherow Secondary Schools (due to the Vale of York Catholic School restructuring), resulting in a doubling of the school's size. The Bar Convent became the junior section, whereas the Mill Mount Manor House were purchased after the closure of Mill Mount County Grammar School for Girls.

=== Mill Mount County Grammar School For Girls ===
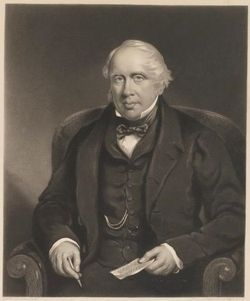
Charles Heneage Elsley Recorder of York, Owner of Mill Mount Manor House

The school was established in 1920 and was initially administered by the City of York Education Committee until 1974 when it was taken over by North Yorkshire County Council. The school had 124 girls enrolled in March 1921, some of whom were transferred from Queen Anne School.

The original Manor building and stables (still used on the upper site), which was built in 1850 for Charles Heneage Elsley Esq., J.P. and Recorder of York, was purchased and adapted by the municipal authority for use as a school.

The school added a chemistry laboratory in 1922 and a cookery centre in 1925. By 1933, there were 272 girls enrolled, and extensions were added in 1935 to provide accommodation for 150 more girls. A games field at Nunthorpe was opened in 1938. By March 1946, there were 383 girls attending the school. The curriculum was expanded over the years, with subjects such as chemistry, general science, and physics being added, and the original School Certificate being replaced with General Certificate of Education (GCEs). In 1965, a plan was proposed to turn York into a comprehensive education system by 1970, with Nunthorpe and Mill Mount joining to become a sixth form college, and the two other grammar schools becoming a comprehensive. However, this plan fell through, and the school remained a girls' grammar school until 1985, and the site was sold to All Saints.

=== St George's Roman Catholic Secondary School ===
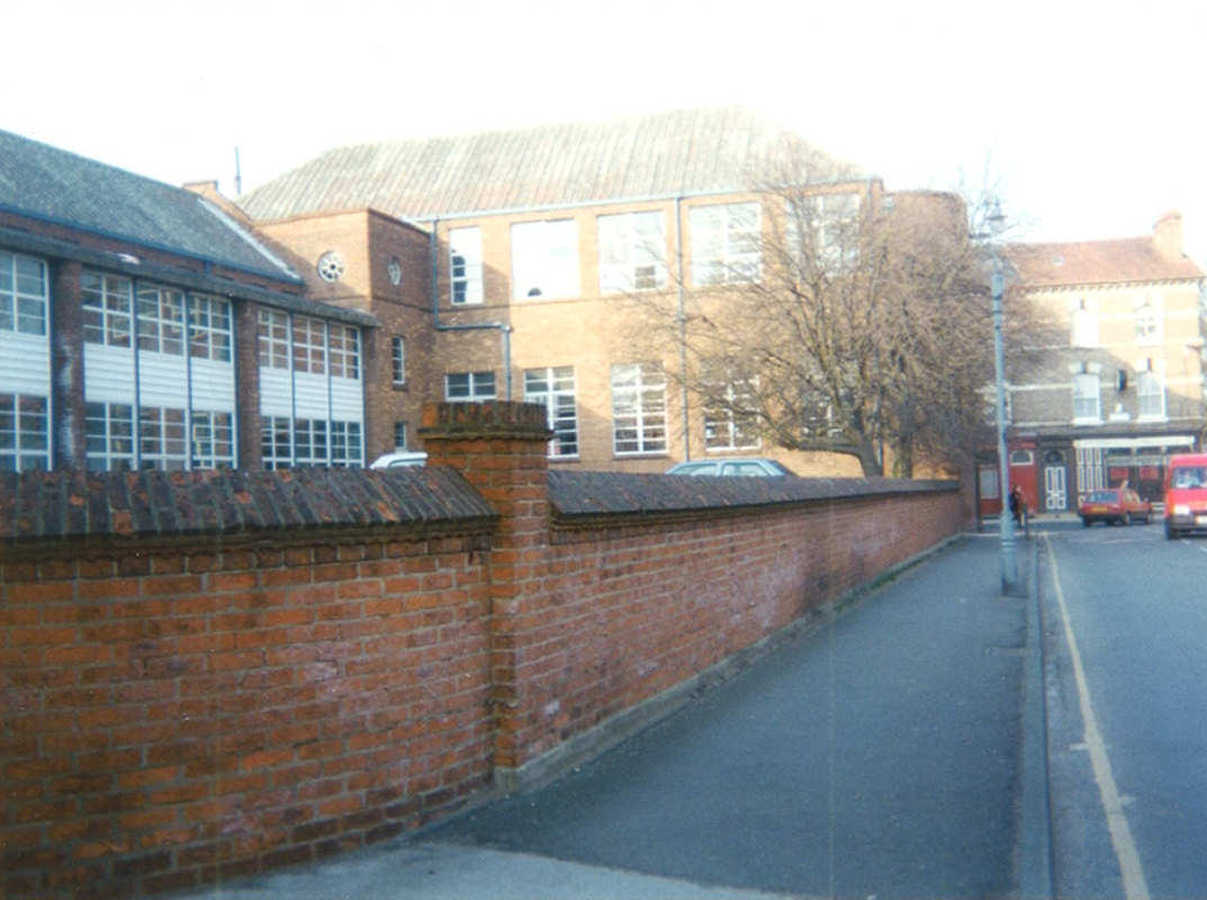
The exterior of the St George's RC Secondary School, which was located on Walmgate

During the period of 1927–1932, St George's School on Margaret Street underwent a reorganisation, resulting in three separate departments for Senior Boys, Mixed, and Infants.

In 1939, construction of a new building for the Senior Boys department began, and was completed in 1948, adjacent to the Primary school.

By 1956, both schools had become voluntary aided schools, with 240 children enrolled in the primary school and 290 boys in the secondary modern school.

However, the Senior school was eventually closed in 1985 due to discussions on the reorganisation of York's Catholic senior schools in the late 1970s. The buildings remained abandoned for many years before being demolished in 1996 to make way for housing. The school was incorporated into All Saints RC School, with the campus relocated to Nunnery Lane and Mill Mount respectively.

=== Headteachers ===
Mother Superiors of the Bar Convent School:

- Frances Bedingfield 1686‒1696
- Dorothy Paston Bedingfield 1696‒1734
- Ester Conyers 1734‒1746
- Mary Hodshon 1746‒1760
- Ann Aspinal 1760‒1790
- Catherine Rouby 1790‒1810
- Elizabeth Coyney 1810‒1826
- M. Austin Chalmers 1826‒1830
- M. Agnes Dunn 1830‒1840
- M. Angela Browne 1840‒1860
- M. Juliana Martin 1860‒1883
- M. Loyola Giles 1883‒1891
- M. Germana Noble 1891‒1897
- M. Francis Pope 1897‒1909
- M. Cecilia Kelly 1909‒1925
- M. Alacoque Murphy 1926‒1932
- M. Aquinas Duran 1932‒1935
- M. Gertrude Murphy 1935‒1950 and 1953‒1964
- M. Imelda Gilbert 1950‒1953
- M. Ancilla Barton 1964‒1970
- M. Magdalen Ingram 1970‒1976
- M. Agatha Leach 1976‒1979, 1982‒1985
- M. Pia Buxton 1979‒1982

Headteachers of All Saints Catholic School:

- Dr. Adrian Elliott 1985–2003
- Mr. Bill Scriven 2003–2019
- Mrs. Sharon Keelan-Beardsley 2019–present

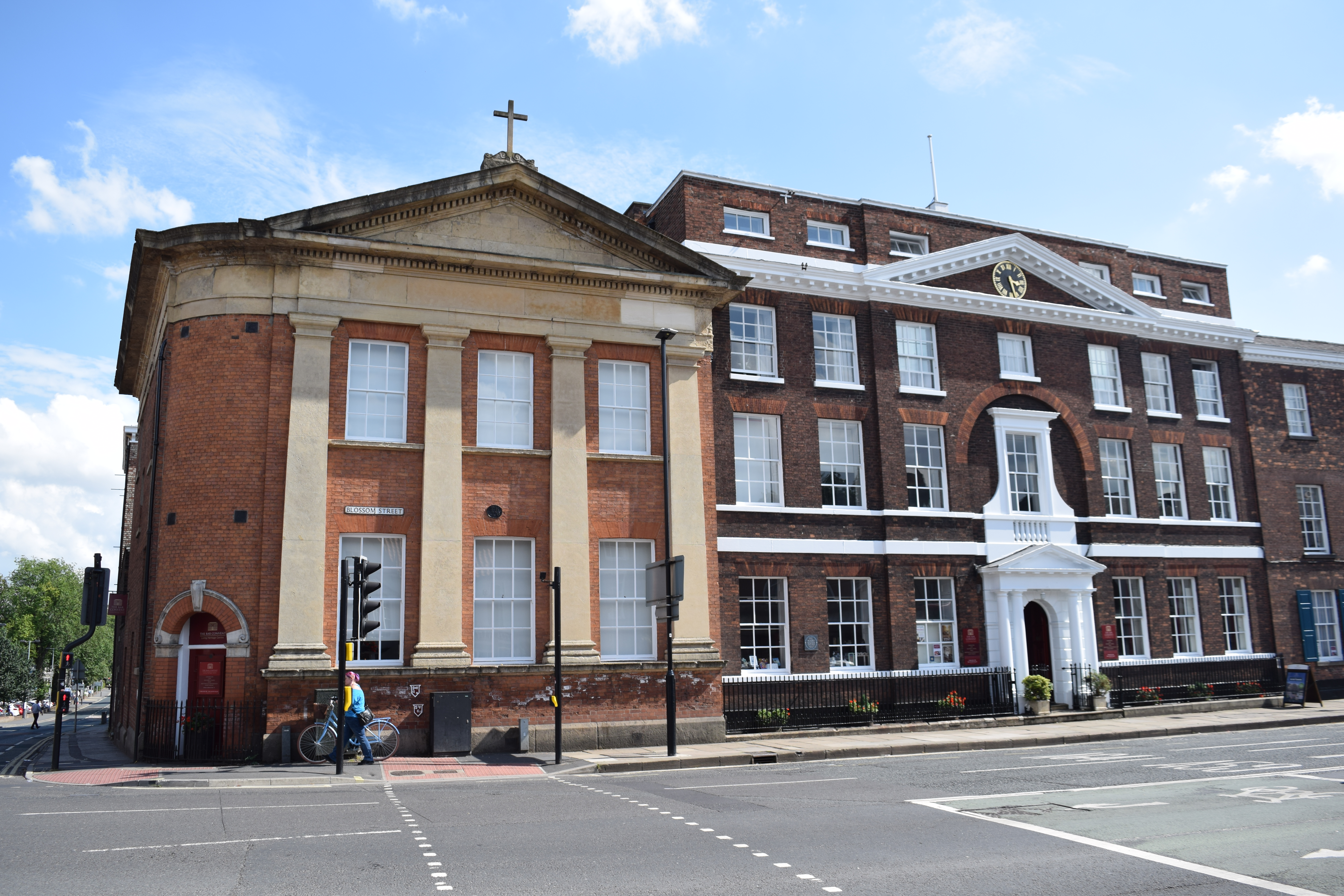
The exterior of the Bar Convent, Located within the same building as All Saints RC School Lower Site

=== Specialist Schools Programme ===
All Saints School was formerly a Language and Performing Arts College which was part of the Specialist schools programme. This meant that it received extra funding for language teaching. It no longer holds this title as the programme was abolished.

=== Academisation ===
Previously a voluntary aided school administered by York City Council, the school attempted to join the Saint Margaret Clitherow Catholic Academy Trust (SMCCAT) which was established by the Diocese of Middlesbrough for the central vicariate, however following a change in structure, SMCCAT was dissolved and in May 2023, All Saints Roman Catholic School converted to academy status sponsored by the Nicholas Postgate Catholic Academy Trust which had originally been formed for the northern vicariate. On 5 May 2023, the School was renamed All Saints Catholic School when it became an academy.

=== Present day ===
At present, the Bar Convent serves as a museum, guest house, and café. The Mary Ward sisters and Sacristan live in the Convent, and the Lower School shares the chapel. The School was linked closely to Saint Francis-Xavier School (SFX) in Richmond for a brief period in 2022–23, when All Saint's headteacher (previously headteacher of SFX) became executive headteacher of both schools.

== Chaplaincy and tradition ==
=== Religion ===
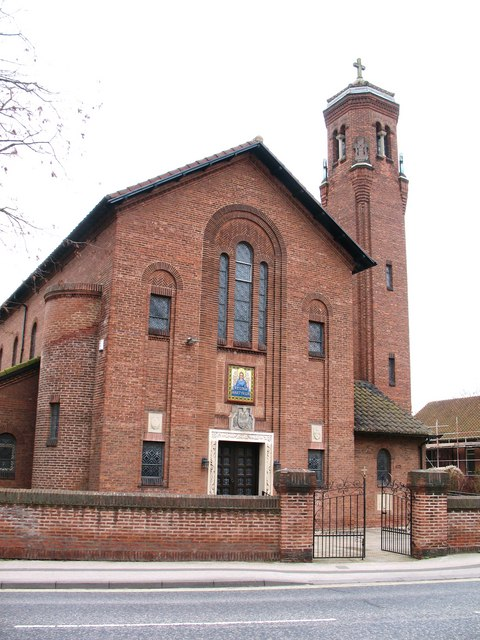
English Martyrs Church on Dalton Terrace

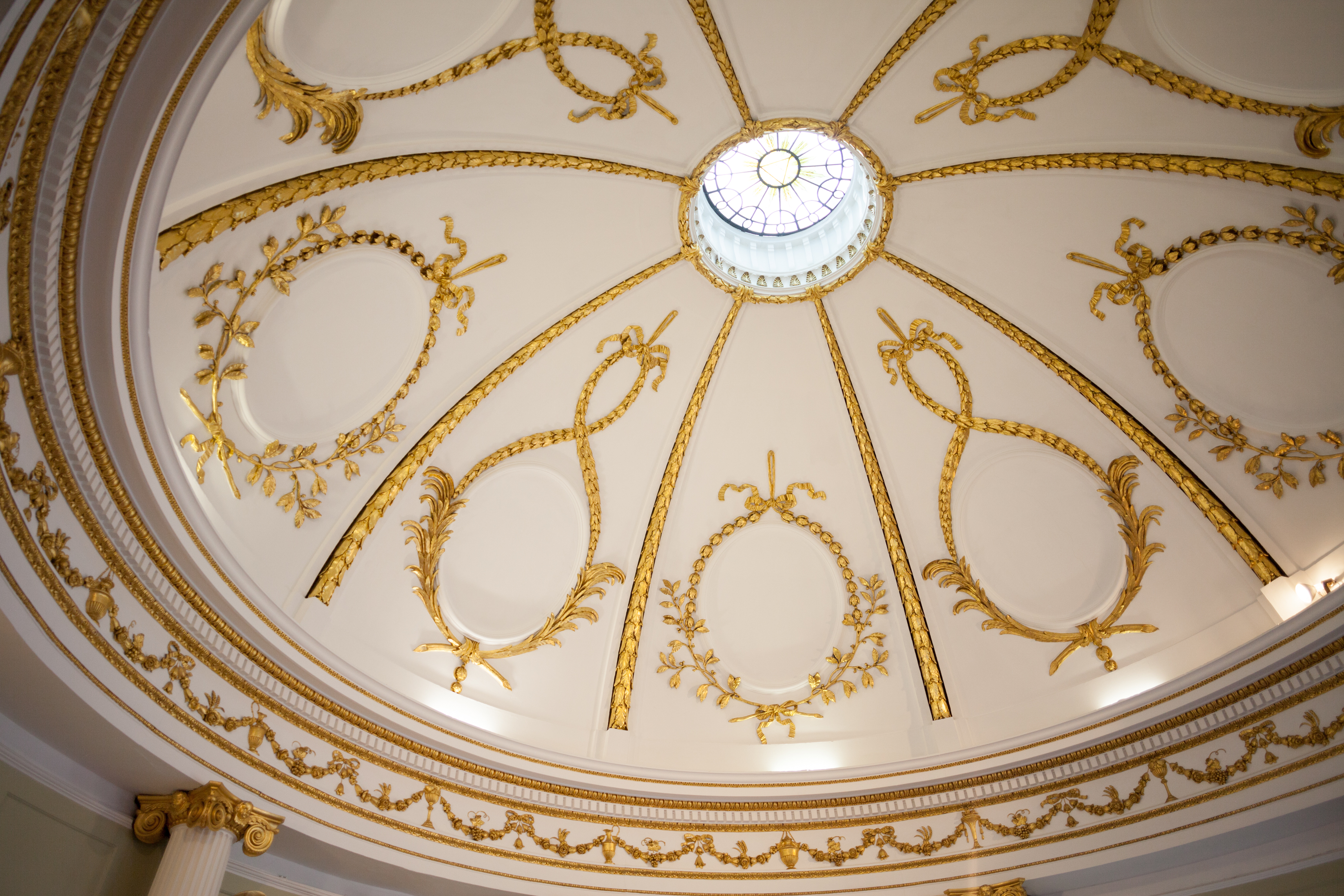
Dome of the shared school and Bar Convent Chapel

All Saints, being the only Catholic high school in York, plays an important role in the Catholic community and history of the city. In addition to serving the parishes in the Central Vicariate of the Diocese of Middlesbrough (York), the school accepts students from parishes and primary schools in Thirsk, Malton, Pocklington, and Tadcaster.

All Saints shares its chapel with the Bar Convent, and have free-use of this. It was built in 1769 by Thomas Atkinson, secretly as Roman Catholic activity was still punishable by death, it has a unique pitched roof to disguise the domed ceiling of the chapel. In the school chapel is also the hand of prominent York saint, Saint Margaret Clitherow.

The school has links with English Martyrs Church which is located 300 meters from the upper site. The school gathers regularly in English Martyrs to celebrate important masses such as Epiphany (which is traditionally celebrated within the first week of the Spring term) Ash Wednesday, Ascension, Saint Peter and Saint Paul.

In addition, every year, the whole school gathers at York Minster for All Saints Day mass and an Advent service (traditionally held in the evening of the first Monday of advent).

Annual pilgrimages are organised to Lourdes in collaboration with the diocese and other diocesan schools.

In response to the invasion of Ukraine by Russian forces in 2022, All Saints organised a prayer chain along the streets of the city in solidarity with Ukrainians.

==== St Michael's Day ====
In around 1696, a mob threatened to destroy the Bar Convent. To keep the children safe, most of them were sent away. The relics were hidden, and the community waited anxiously for what might happen that night. Reverend Mother Bedingfield placed the convent under the protection of Saint Michael by hanging his picture above the convent door.

Those in the house opposite saw a tall figure on a white horse wielding a sword above the convent. The mob retreated, leaving the convent and its occupants unharmed.

Following tradition, the youngest pupil in Year 7, along with several other Year 7 pupils, attend a procession on St Michael's Day. The procession begins in the Bar Convent hall and includes the retelling of the story as well as hymns being sung.

=== Form system ===
The School operates a form system for sports and school events; each form is named after a Saint who represents a Catholic Virtue. Traditionally Form Feast Days are celebrated vertically between forms of the same saint in different years, where students will come in wearing their form saint colours to a mass in honour of the value/saint. Children stay in the same form throughout each Key Stage, with membership reassigned at the start of the next Key Stage. Interform tournaments are held in Hockey, Netball, Football, Basketball, Rugby and Athletics.

Form Saint		Virtue
BE	Bernadette	Compassion
CL	Clitherow	Truth
JB	Bosco	Respect
KO	Kolbe	Forgiveness
RO	Romero	Justice
TE	Teresa	Service
AL	Aloysius	Gentleness
DP	De Porres	Humility
FR	Francis	Stewardship
MA	Magdalen	Witness

The School has a student leadership team, headed by two head students, chosen through an application process in the Sixth Form, these speak at major events/masses and open evenings. These Head Students, and their deputies, form part of the six core-student leaders, alongside the two chairs of student council.

Coat of arms of All Saints Catholic School, York
Escutcheon Azure, an Agnus Dei Argent supporting a banner of the same charged with a cross Gules. A chief embattled Or, in base a rose Argent barbed and seeded Proper. Ensigned by an ancient crown Or. Motto Fides Caritas Unitas Symbolism The Agnus Dei represents Jesus Christ as the "Lamb of God," signifying His sacrifice and victory over sin. The azure (blue) colour symbolizes heavenly grace, faith, and truth. The embattled chief with three bulwarks suggests protection and resilience. It also represents the Holy Trinity—Father, Son, and Holy Spirit—and the York City Walls, which protected the school from religious persecution in the 17th century. The gold (Or) colour conveys divine wisdom and enlightenment. The white rose at the base, often linked to the Virgin Mary, highlights Marian devotion and virtues such as purity, humility, and love. It also represents the Yorkshire rose, as the school was founded as the school for Yorkshire Catholic girls. The ancient crown above the shield signifies Christ's divine authority.

== Building relocation and modernisation ==
Since its establishment in its current form, All Saints has operated a split-site school, which as (then Headteacher) William (Bill) Scriven described in 2013:

"Running a split-site school costs us about £300,000 extra a year, and we get a £137,000 split site allowance from the council with the rest of the money coming from our budget. If we were in one building we would be able to avoid a lot of the current duplication of costs."

Therefore the school has long sought to relocate to meet the demands of its growing student body as the largest Catholic school in Yorkshire. This posed a challenge as the site would need to be in close proximity to the rail station and other transport connections to facilitate the Catholic community from outside the York area attending the school. This was the reason for a failure for the bid of a £20 million new school in 2013. In March 2022 the debate about whether the school buildings are fit for use and large enough was reignited due to the government announcing the School Rebuilding Programme. Local MP Rachael Maskell raised the safety and wellbeing of the school buildings for the student body in the House of Commons:

"Parts of the school date back over 300 years. I have had the tour with the estates team at the school; it is taking ever more of their time just to try to keep the site safe, which is a major challenge."

The member of parliament for York Central also discussed the nature of the Mill Mount location as of note in the bid to rebuild the school:

"Needless to say, the behaviour of inebriated racegoers poses a risk, as they urinate on their way back to the city through the school premises (…) need to be taken into account in the programme for rebuilding schools"

In December 2022, it was announced that the school had succeeded in their application to the Schools Rebuilding Programme, and would receive funding for a refurbishment of one or more of the buildings. Rachael Maskell spoke again:

"While the details of the school rebuilding programme are yet to be released, I am delighted that, at long last, the school has been recognised as requiring an upgrade (…) This news is most definitely a fantastic Christmas present for all in the All Saints community"

The school applied for planning permission to improve the nature of the school's upper site in May 2024.

== Attainment ==
In 2023, 9% of all GCSE grades were at grade 9 which is almost double the national average and 36% of all grades at were 7 or above which is double the average for Yorkshire and the Humber.

All of the students studying A Level Further Maths attained an A* in the subject, In drama over 70% of the students achieved an A or A* and in philosophy and fine art this was 60% and 63% respectively. 77% of history students achieved an A*-B, in biology 69% achieved A*-B and psychology and English language 73% and 70% respectively attained the top grades.

All Saint's BTEC results are the best the school has ever achieved with all students achieving a merit or higher.

In November 2022, the school achieved the fifth position among state schools in the North, as ranked in Parent Power, The Sunday Times Schools Guide 2023. It also secured the first place in the northern comprehensive School, northern Catholic School and York Secondary School categories.

The school was judged Outstanding by Ofsted in 2016 and 2024.

In addition, the school has won many awards including UK linguistics Olympiad school of the year in 2011.

== Old Saintsians ==
Alumni of All Saints are called Old Saintsians, as students currently studying at the school are All Saintsians. The school runs an alumni service to keep in contact with students who have left, this is majoritively carried out by the Sixth Form.

However due to All Saints being a merger of multiple schools and buildings, alumni before 1985 are very difficult to trace:

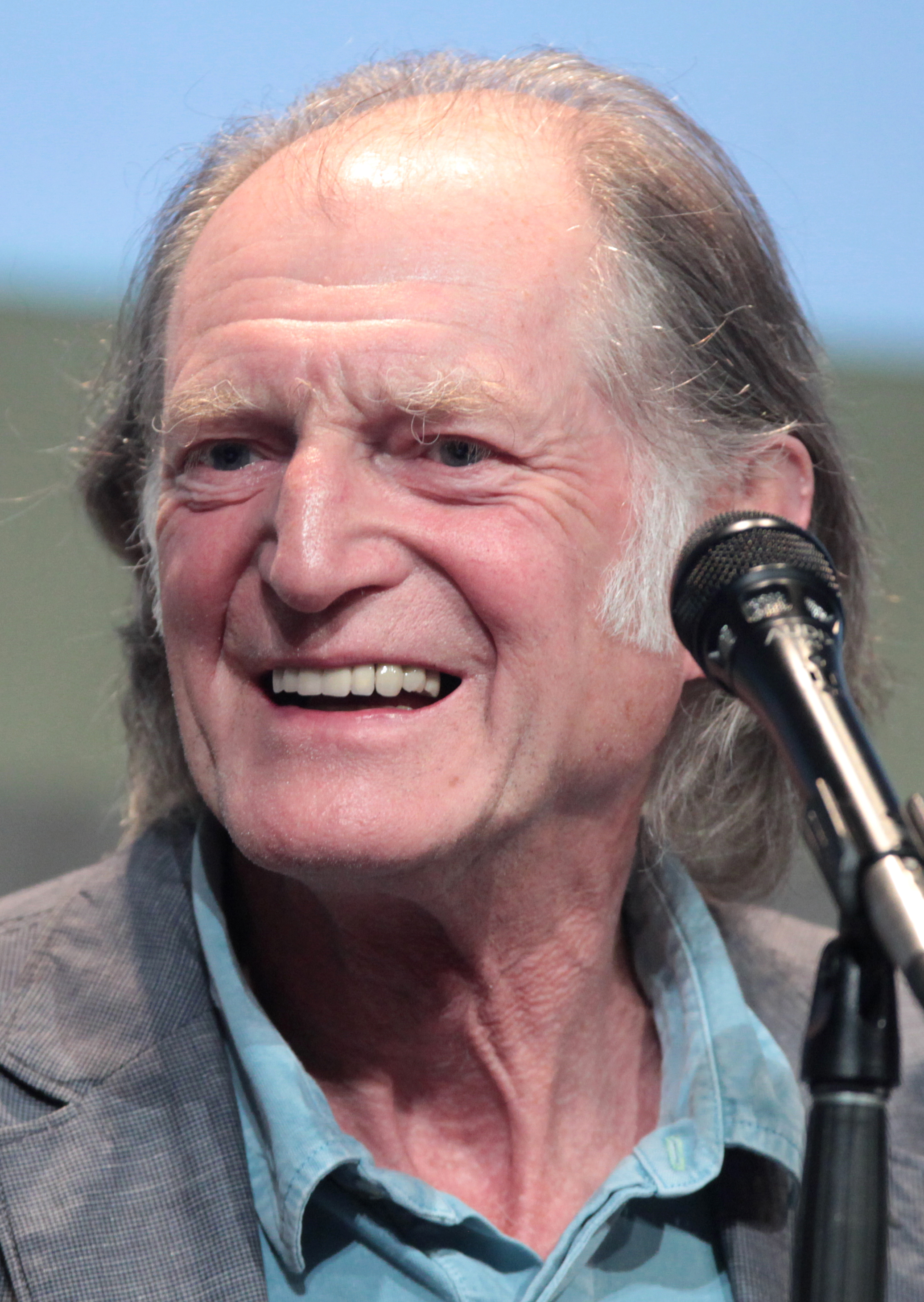
David Bradley, Harry Potter actor

=== St George's RC Senior School ===
Incorporated into All Saints in 1985 during the reform of Catholic education in the Vale of York.

- David Bradley (b. 1942), actor; best known for playing Argus Filch in the Harry Potter film series and Walder Frey in the HBO series Game of Thrones

=== Mill Mount County Grammar School for Girls ===
This school was incorporated into Millthorpe school but was situated in All Saints upper site.

- Sue Doughty (née Powell) (b. 1948), former Liberal Democrat MP for Guildford (1959–66)
- Dame Karen Jones (b. 1956), businessperson and founder of the Café Rouge restaurant chain
- Marion Paton (1923–2016), Bletchley Park codebreaker
- Nicolette Zeeman (b. 1956), literary fellow specialising in devotional writings at the University of Cambridge

=== Bar Convent School ===
- Frances Ball (1794–1861), founder of the Irish branch of the Institute of the Blessed Virgin Mary
- John Barry (1933–2011), film music composer who wrote the scores for 11 James Bond films
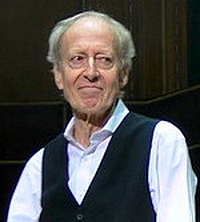
  John Barry, five-time Oscar winning composer
- Anne Fairfax — heir to the Fairfax Estates of which Gilling Castle which she donated to become Ampleforth College
- Alathea Fairfax — daughter of Charles Fairfax, 5th Viscount Fairfax of Emley (Lord-Lieutenant of the North Riding of Yorkshire and Jacobite later replaced during the Glorious Revolution)
- Mother Mary Loyola (1845–1930), bestselling author of Catholic books
- Mary Ann Radcliffe (1746–1818), prominent figure in the early feminist movement
- Mary Ravenscroft (d. 1796), 7th Countess of Traquair and notable 18th-century diarist
- Tricia Walker (1964–2018), author
- Barbara Ward, Baroness Jackson of Lodsworth (1914–1981), founder of the International Institute for Environment and Development, Foreign Editor of The Economist, and notable economist the first to widely articulate the concept of sustainable development.
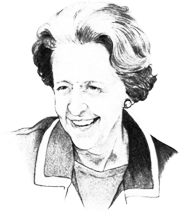
  Barbara Ward, pioneer of sustainable development and adviser to policymakers in the UK and the United States
- Maisie Ward (1889–1975), biographer, writer and co-founder of the publishing company Sheed and Ward

=== All Saints Catholic School ===
- Anna Docherty (b. 2000), four times British champion, Team GB track cyclist
- Marcas Mac an Tuairneir (b. 1984), award-winning poet and singer-songwriter

== Notable staff ==
Tony Teasdale — winner of series 1 of Race Across the World, former PE teacher and Assistant Headteacher

== Curriculum ==
All Saints covers the national curriculum as well as the Catholic educational curriculum. Qualifications attainable from the school are BTEC, GCSE, A-level and Level 2 Qualifications.

Subjects offered in KS3 and KS4	Subjects offered in KS5 (Sixth Form)
Art; Biology; Business Studies*; Chemistry; Dance; Design Technology; Drama; English Language; English Literature; French; Food Technology; Geography; German; History; Latin*; Mathematics; Further Mathematics*; Music; Personal development (PSHCE); Physics; Physical Education; Religious Education; Spanish; Textiles; *only taught in KS4	Art & Design; Biology; Business Studies*; Chemistry; Computer Science*; Design Technology & Product Design; Dance; Drama & Theatre Studies; English Language; English Literature; Ethics, Philosophy & Theology; Fashion & Textiles; Fine Art; French; Further Mathematics; Geography; German; Government & Politics; Health & Social Care (BTEC only); History; Latin; Mathematics; Media; Music Technology; Music; Physical Education*; Philosophy; Photography; Physics; Psychology; Sociology; Spanish; *offered as a BTEC Qualification also

== In popular culture ==
The school has been used in several films including Bonus Track a British musical coming-of-age romantic comedy film, starring Joe Anders and Samuel Small. The Film4 production Extra Geography, an adaptation of Rose Tremain's short story was partially filmed at All Saints.

== See also ==
- Grade II* listed buildings in the City of York
- List of direct grant grammar schools
- Listed buildings in York (outside the city walls, southern part)
