= Mary Ann Radcliffe =

British figure in the early feminist movement

- Born: Mary Ann Clayton; 18 June 1746 (baptism); Nottingham
- Died: Shortly before 6 August 1818; Edinburgh
- Resting place: Old Calton Cemetery, Edinburgh
- Education: Bar Convent School, York
- Occupation: writer
- Spouse: Joseph Radcliffe
- Children: Anna, Mary, Sarah, Joseph, James, Charles, Winifred, Frances
- Writing career
- Language: English
- Period: Regency
- Genres: Feminism, Autobiography, Possibly Gothic Novelist
- Notable works: The Female Advocate; or, An Attempt to Recover the Rights of Women from Male Usurpation, 1799

Mary Ann Radcliffe (1746 – 1818) was an important British figure in the early feminist movement.

== Life ==
She was born Mary Ann Clayton in Nottingham, the elder daughter of a successful Anglican merchant James Clayton and his Catholic wife Sarah Blatherwick and christened at St Nicholas Nottingham on 18 June 1746. James Clayton was already 70 at the time of Mary Ann's birth and died when she was four. Mary Ann's sister Sarah predeceased him leaving Mary Ann as his heiress. Radcliffe was raised as a Catholic by her mother and educated at the Bar Convent in York. Mary Ann eloped to marry Joseph Radcliffe of Coxwold, Yorkshire at age 15. Initially they were married in private by a Catholic priest, but Radcliffe's guardians insisted that she be married in the Anglican Church and the marriage was conducted at St Nicholas' in Nottingham on 2 May 1762. Joseph Radcliffe seems to have been descended from the Radcliffe family of Ugthorpe Old Hall, however Mary Ann Radcliffe insists in her memoirs that he is related to the Earl of Derwentwater, a statement confirmed by a reference from Lord Traquair who states that they were "distantly related to the Derwentwater family." Joseph Radcliffe's parents are described in Letter III of the memoirsof the Memoir (Edinburgh, 1810) as living in Yorkshire, and a 'good old couple' who were 'quite overjoyed' 'at seeing their only surviving son so comfortably provided for.' Mary Ann's first mention of her husband's Derwentwater ancestry occurs when she lists her sons: “and next Joseph, so named after his father, James, in memory of my father, and the unfortunate Earl of Derwentwater, who forfeited his life in the rebellion of 1715, and Charles after the brother of the Earl of D--, who fell martyr to the same cause, in 1745, from which family I was always told, my husband was a descendent”

The couple had eight children in quick succession, Ann, Mary Sarah, Joseph, James, Charles, Winifred and Frances. The two latter died as infants. Financial difficulties due to their growing family forced Joseph Radcliffe to invest in the sugar industry, and after unsuccessful speculations Mary Ann's inheritance was depleted. The family estates in three counties inherited from James Clayton were sold to pay Joseph's debts. From this point in 1783 Mary Ann's husband could not provide for the family. She sought positions as a housekeeper at Traquair House, governess, and in a milliner shop. With hard work she was able to put her sons, Joseph, James and Charles through school. Joseph Radcliffe Senior found work as house steward to Sir John Stanley, 6th Baronet Stanley at Alderley Park in 1783 and was not to see Mary Ann Radcliffe again. Joseph Radcliffe senior died in 1804 and Edward Stanley, son of Sir John and Bishop of Norwich was executor of his will. Mary Ann's eldest son Joseph became a merchant, her second son James a pastrycook in Holborn and her youngest son Charles after absconding from the army became a successful though minor painter who died in Salem Massachusetts in 1806.

Of Mary Ann and her husband, William Radcliffe the Rouge Croix Pursuivant writes "Joseph Radclyffe of Coxwold, born in 1726, married the heiress of James Clayton of Nottingham. "Having some little fortune of his own, which was improved by that of his wife, he soon after his marriage kept a house in Grosvenor Square, with a coach and four, and kept it up as the means lasted. His widow, a clever sensible woman, kept a ready-made shoe shop, in about 1795, in Oxford Street, and is now (1810) in Edinburgh, on the bounty, I believe, of some old female acquaintance."

While working as housekeeper at Traquair House for the Earl of Traquair and his wife, the former Mary Ravenscroft – a student with Radcliffe at the Bar Convent, Radcliffe befriended the controversial Scottish theologian Alexander Geddes. This friendship was to last until his death in 1802. Geddes encouraged her to follow her conscience, leading to her abandonment of Catholicism. This led to further estrangement from her friends and supporters and increased her difficulties in finding employment. Her Memoirs, commenced in 1807, were written to raise money after her final business venture, a pastry shop near Portobello in Scotland failed due to Mary Ann's rheumatism and failing health. By the time of the publications of her Memoirs in 1810 she was living on the charity of her friend, Mrs Ferrier of St John's Hill in Edinburgh. Ferrier and Watersons Wax Chandlers of High Street, Edinburgh were the point of sale for the book.

Mary Ann Radcliffe is often listed as having died in 1810, the date of the publication of her memoirs, however her death certificate lists her of having died of 'a decline' in 1818 in Edinburgh. She is buried in an unmarked grave in Old Calton Cemetery.

== Works ==
Radcliffe is most famous for her book,The Female Advocate; or, An Attempt to Recover the Rights of Women from Male Usurpation (1799). This book discussed how men working in millinery and other occupations took jobs away from women forcing them to prostitution. Radcliffe's argument was framed in Christianity. She stressed how respectable women are turning to prostitution because of poverty and lack of respectable work. She argued that lack of education, societal prejudices of what a genteel woman should or should not do, hampered women from obtaining a job in a respectable establishment.

There is disagreement as to whether Mary Ann Radcliffe is the author of several Gothic novels attributed to her. Manfroné was one of the most popular Gothic novels of the early nineteenth century and was remembered warmly by William Makepeace Thackeray. The Memoirs of Mrs Mary Ann Radcliffe; in Familiar Letters to Her Female Friend complicates matters by making no reference to Mary Ann as a Gothic novelist. Other novels attributed to Mary Ann Radcliffe are Radzivil and The Fate of Velina de Guidova, both published in 1790 by William Lane at the Minerva Press. Radclife’s (sic) New Novelist’s Pocket Magazine appeared in 1802, a collection of fictions compiled “by Mrs Mary Anne Radclife, of Wimbledon in Surrey.” Certainly Radcliffe was living in Surrey around this time. Mary Ann Radcliffe states in her memoirs that it was her intention to publish all of her books anonymously however she was coerced by her publisher into publishing under her name to benefit by the similarities of her name with that of the more famous Gothic novelist Ann Radcliffe.

Her later published book, The Memoirs of Mrs. Mary Ann Radcliffe; in Familiar Letters to her Female Friend in 1810, made apparent the strong influence of her life's circumstances on her first book. The memoirs are written in a deliberately cryptic style, using initials instead of names for both places and people, however many can be identified using clues provided by Radcliffe in the text. For example while working as a companion to an elderly gentleman at R___, she mentions the house as being opposite the place where Magna Carta was signed, identifying the place as Runnymede. The diaries of Lady Traquair are useful in providing other details of Radcliffe's life including her involvement with Alexander Geddes.

== Publications ==
- The female advocate or an attempt to recover the rights of women from male usurpation. By Mary Anne Radcliffe. London: Printed for Vernor and Hood, NO. 31, Poultry, 1799
- The memoirs of Mrs. Mary Ann Radcliffe in familiar letters to her female friend. Edinburgh: Printed for the author and sold by Manners & Miller, 1810
