= Mary Ravenscroft =

Scottish noblewoman and diarist (d. 1796)

Mary Ravenscroft, Countess of Traquair
- Countess of Traquair
- Arms of the Earls of Traquair
- Tenure: 1782-1796
- Predecessor: Christian Anstruther
- Successor: Final holder
- Born: Wickham Grange, Spalding, Lincolnshire, England
- Died: 1796; Madrid, Spain
- Residence: Traquair House
- Spouse: Charles Stewart (m. 1773)
- Issue: Charles Stewart, 8th Earl of Traquair; The Hon. Louisa Stewart
- Parents: George Ravenscroft; Mary Slater

Mary Ravenscroft, 7th Countess of Traquair (died 1796), was an 18th-century Scottish noblewoman and diarist, known for her insights into family life at Traquair House.

== Life ==
Born Mary Ravenscroft, she was the daughter of George Ravenscroft of Wickham Grange, Spalding, Lincolnshire, and his wife, Mary Slater. In August 1773, she married Charles Stewart, who would later become the 7th Earl of Traquair.

She was educated at the Bar Convent School in York alongside notable early feminist Mary Ann Radcliffe, who she became friends with and employed as housemistress at Traquair House.

Mary and Charles had two children:

- Lady Louisa Stuart (born 1776)
- Charles Stewart (born 1781), who later succeeded as the 8th Earl of Traquair.

In 1784, the family left Traquair, with the Earl believing that the family's fortunes could be improved in Spain. Mary Ravenscroft died in Madrid in 1796 and never returned to Scotland.

== Works ==
Mary Ravenscroft's diary, kept between 1782 and 1783, provides a valuable glimpse into daily life at Traquair House. The diary captures personal moments, including her role as a devoted nurse to her young son as he underwent inoculation against smallpox, a medical procedure that was relatively new at the time.
