= Charles Heneage Elsley =

English lawyer and author

Charles Heneage Elsley Esq
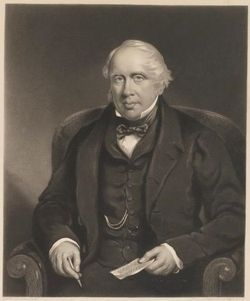
- Born: August 14, 1792; Burneston, North Yorkshire, England
- Died: August 3, 1865 (aged 72); York, North Yorkshire, England
- Burial place: St Patrick Churchyard, Patrick Brompton, Richmondshire District, North Yorkshire, England
- Education: Called to the bar, Middle Temple, January 29, 1819; Peterhouse College, Cambridge
- Title: Recorder of York & Richmond
- Children: 10
- Father: Rev Heneage Elsley

Charles Heneage Elsley Esq J.P. (14 August 1792 – 3 August 1865) was an English lawyer and author. He was born in Yorkshire, the son of the Reverend Heneage Elsley. He graduated ninth in Tripos in 1813 at Peterhouse, Cambridge. He was called to the bar in 1819 and became a barrister.

== Main works ==
Elsley was the author of four books:

- Reports of Cases by Sir W. Blackstone, revised (1828)
- Essay on the relation between the English and French languages (1858)
- Church Leases Considered (1833)
- Reform, universal suffrage, ballot (1860)

== Career ==
He was also a Recorder of Richmond (1827–65), York (1834–65), and Scarborough (1836–65), and a County Court Judge (1845–54). Elsley was also the Vice-President of the Yorkshire Philosophical Society (1838-1839, 1844-1845).

== Personal life ==
He married Mary Emily, daughter of Colonel William Hale of Acomb, in 1824. The pair had 10 children: Frances Elizabeth, Gregory, Miriam, Emily, Heneage William, Elizabeth, Fanny, Mary Charlotte, Charles, Harriet Emma.

Elsley died at his home on Mill Mount, York in 1865.

== Legacy ==
The manor house built by Elsley on Mill Mount, was purchased by the municipal authority in 1920 for use as the Mill Mount County Grammar School for Girls. This later became All Saints Catholic School in 1985, many of the original features Elsley had built into the manor house are still intact.
