= Charles Stewart, 7th Earl of Traquair =

Scottish nobleman and landowner (1746–1827)

The Right Honourable The Earl of Traquair FRSE FSA Scot
- Earl of Traquair
- Arms of the Earls of Traquair
- Tenure: 1779–1827
- Born: August 1746; Traquair House, Peeblesshire, Scotland
- Died: 14 October 1827 (aged 81); Traquair House, Peeblesshire, Scotland
- Spouse: Mary Ravenscroft (m. 1773)
- Issue: Charles Stewart, 8th Earl of Traquair; The Hon. Louisa Stewart
- Parents: John Stewart, 6th Earl of Traquair; Christian Weir

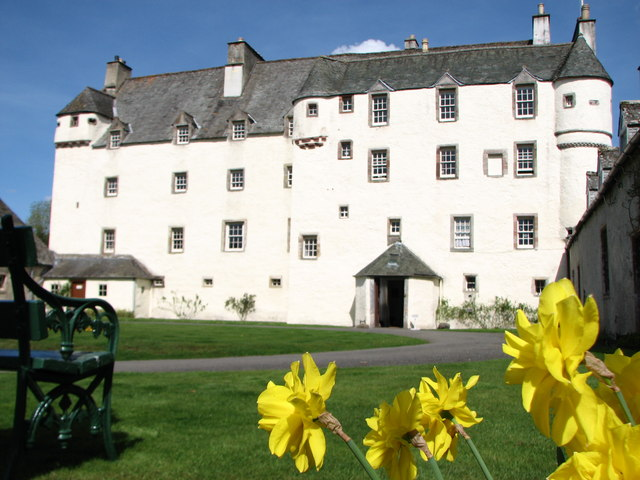
Traquair House

Charles Stewart, 7th Earl of Traquair, FSA Scot FRSE (1746–1827) was an 18/19th century Scottish landowner.

== Life ==
He was born at Traquair House near Peebles in August 1744, the only son of John Stewart, 6th Earl of Traquair. In 1779, following the death of his father, he inherited Traquair House and became the 7th Earl of Traquair.

In 1798 he was elected a Fellow of the Royal Society of Edinburgh. His proposers were Joseph Black, Dugald Stewart, and Alexander Keith of Dunnottar. He died at Traquair on 14 October 1827.

== Family ==
In August 1773 he married Mary Ravenscroft (d.1796), second daughter of George Ravenscoft of Wykeham Hall in Lincolnshire. Their children were Charles Stewart, 8th Earl of Traquair (1781-1861), and the Hon Louisa Stewart (1776-1875).

Peerage of Scotland
Preceded by John Stewart	Earl of Traquair; 1779–1827	Succeeded by Charles Stewart
