= Nick Miller (weather forecaster) =

British weather forecaster (born 1970)

- Born: Nicholas James Miller; 4 January 1970 (age 56); York, Yorkshire, England
- Education: Nunthorpe Grammar School; University of Nottingham
- Occupation: Weather presenter
- Years active: 1995–present
- Employer: ITV Weather
- Known for: BBC Weather

Nicholas James Miller (born 4 January 1970) is a British weather forecaster employed by ITV Weather.

== Early life ==
He was born in York, Yorkshire, and attended Nunthorpe Grammar School, then a selective school (until 1985), in York, later going to the University of Nottingham.

== Career ==
Miller's BBC career began at BBC South East – presenting weather bulletins for Kent and Sussex from October 2003 until January 2007.

Miller has also worked for BBC Local Radio across the UK including BBC Radio York, Lancashire, Nottingham and Southern Counties, and spent some time working as a weather forecaster in the United States from 1999 to 2003 at KRTV in Great Falls, Montana.

Miller joined the team at the BBC Weather Centre in London in January 2007, and could be seen presenting on BBC News, BBC World News, BBC Radio 4 and BBC One. He appeared regularly on the BBC News at One the BBC News at Six and BBC News at Ten.

In 2012 Miller was the reporter on a BBC One Inside Out Special about the drought. His report was networked across all regional versions of the programme. In December 2012 he also provided a networked report in a BBC One regional special shown in England, Wales and Northern Ireland about the weather of 2012.

Miller also reported for BBC News including a report on the 25th anniversary of the Great Storm in which he interviewed Michael Fish about his infamous broadcast.

On 15 March 2013 Miller became the final weather forecaster to present the last full national weather forecast, from the iconic studio TC7, at BBC Television Centre in London, on the BBC News at Six bulletin, which was presented by newsreader Sophie Raworth.

Miller is also the weather forecaster on the Springwatch, Autumnwatch and Winterwatch nature programmes.

Miller now presents weather forecasts for the ITV Weather nations and regions as of January 2024, initially on an ad hoc basis, before becoming permanent in autumn 2025.

== Personal life ==
He lives in Buckinghamshire near Denham.
