= Charles Whiting =

British writer and historian (1926–2007)

Charles Henry Whiting
- Education: Leeds University
- Occupations: writer, history professor
- Spouse(s): Irma Krueger (m. 1948– d.2001); Gillian Tidmus (m. 2005 – his death 2007)
- Children: Julian
- Writing career
- Pen name: Duncan Harding, Ian Harding, John Kerrigan, Leo Kessler, Klaus Konrad, and Duncan Stirling
- Years active: 1956–2007
- Genres: fiction, history, travel
- Subjects: Second World War, Ernest Hemingway,
- Notable works: Lest I Fall (1956), York Blitz, 1942, Hemingway Goes To War
- Notable awards: George Dowty Prize at the 1956 Cheltenham Literature Festival

Charles Henry Whiting (18 December 1926 – 24 July 2007), was a British writer and military historian and with some 350 books of fiction and non-fiction to his credit, under his own name and a variety of pseudonyms including Duncan Harding, Ian Harding, John Kerrigan, Leo Kessler,Klaus Konrad, K.N. Kostov, and Duncan Stirling.

== Early life and education ==
Born in the Bootham area of York, England, Whiting was the son of a fitter. He studied at the Nunthorpe Grammar School and left in 1943, at age 16, to join the British Army by lying about his age. Keen to be in on the wartime action, Whiting was attached to the 52nd Armoured Reconnaissance Regiment, and by age 18 saw duty in France, Holland, Belgium, and Germany in the latter stages of World War II, rising to the rank of sergeant. While still a soldier, he observed conflicts between the highest-ranking British and American generals which he would write about extensively in later years.

He demobbed in 1947 and married in 1948. After the war, he stayed on in Germany completing his A-levels via correspondence course and teaching English before being enrolled at Leeds University reading History and German Language. As an undergraduate, he was afforded opportunities for study at several European universities (including Cologne University (briefly), then Leeds (1949–1953), and Saarbrücken (1955–56),

== Career ==
He completed his first novel The Frat Wagon (1954) while still an undergraduate at Leeds; it was published by Jonathan Cape in 1954. Next followed three wartime thrillers: Lest I Fall (1956), which was awarded the George Dowty Prize at the 1956 Cheltenham Literature Festival, was optioned by Rank but never filmed, and which financed Whiting's study tour in North America and led on to a contract with the University of Maryland University College, which at that time was providing degree courses for US military officers stationed in Europe.

Next, he published Journey to No End, followed by The Mighty Fallen (1958).

In 1967, he began writing non-fiction books for the New York publisher Ian Ballantine. Whiting continued this work even when producing novels.

After these three novels, he put his literary career on hold. After gaining his degree, he worked in a variety of fields in Europe and the United States. He taught as an assistant professor of History at Maryland and Bradford universities before returning to Germany with a post at Trier in 1958. He also lectured at Saarbrücken and Bielefeld before returning to Britain in 1973. Elsewhere, Whiting worked as a translator for a German chemical factory, in spells as a publicist, as a correspondent for The Times, and as a feature writer and German correspondent for such diverse periodicals as Education Forum and The Times Literary Supplement (for both of which he was a German correspondent), International Review of Linguistics, Soldier Magazine, and Playboy.

Whiting became a touring academic living in Spain, France, Germany, Turkey, and Italy while teaching military history and strategy to the US Army. It was while doing this he would meet his first wife, Irma, whose father had suffered persecution in Hamburg for his opposition to the Nazis, and eventually the couple settled in a remote Belgian village.

It was while living there that Whiting began to compose novels and non-fiction at a high rate, initially overwhelming his publishers. Between 1970 and 1976, in a prolific burst, he wrote a total of 34 books which he described as "Bang-bang, thrills-and-spills" becoming one of the leading figures of the British paperback industry and its 1970s boom in novels drenched in violence and sex.

It was to deal with his work rate that publishers developed a number of different markets for his output, who publishing his work under his own name as well as the names Duncan Harding, John Kerrigan, and Klaus Konrad and, at the suggestion of publisher Anthony Cheetham, his most successful nom de plume, Leo Kessler, whose annual sales would reach 60,000 copies during the 1980s.

From 1976, he was a full-time author and would average some six novels a year for the rest of his life.

In addition to writing his novels, his weekly educational columns and dealing with his lecturing commitments, he also established a language centre in the German city of Trier and a European studies department at Bradford.

His final novel, written as Leo Kessler, is now available as an ebook titled Some Desperate Glory.

One of his most famous books of non-fiction is York Blitz, 1942 (also published as Fire Over York), about the German bombing of York in April 1942, while his most controversial is Hemingway Goes To War, about the misadventures of the writer Ernest Hemingway during World War II. The latter was republished in 2008 by Humdrumming Ltd, which is also republishing some early Leo Kessler titles, kicking off with Fire Over Kabul, as well as his very first novel, The Frat Wagon.

== Selected publications ==
- Whiting, Charles (1954). The Frat Wagon. Jonathan Cape.
- Kessler, Leo (1976). Forced March. Futura Publications. ISBN 0860073580. OCLC 877327692.
- Whiting, Charles (1976). Bloody Aachen. Stein and Day. OCLC 2188959.
- Whiting, Charles (1976). The Spymasters: The True Story of Anglo-American Intelligence Operations Within Nazi Germany, 1939–1945. Saturday Review Press. ISBN 0841504180. OCLC 2015475. Originally published as The Battle for Twelveland.
- Taylor, Eric; Kessler, Leo (1986). York Blitz, 1942: the Baedeker räid on York, April 29th, 1942. William Sessions. ISBN 1850720096. OCLC 15283447.
- Whiting, Charles (1999). Hemingway Goes To War. Sutton Pub. ISBN 0750922508. OCLC 41664272. Originally, published in 1990 by Crowood Press under the title: Papa Goes to War.

== Personal life ==
Whiting married first wife, Irma Krueger, in 1948; she died in 2001. Together they had a son, Julian.

Whiting married Gillian Tidmus in 2005.

== Death ==
Whiting died 24 July 2007 in York, aged 80, from renal failure. His wife Gillian Tidmus and son, Julian, survive him.
