= St George's Roman Catholic Secondary School, York =

Coordinates: 53.955893°N 1.074115°W

St George's RC Secondary School, York
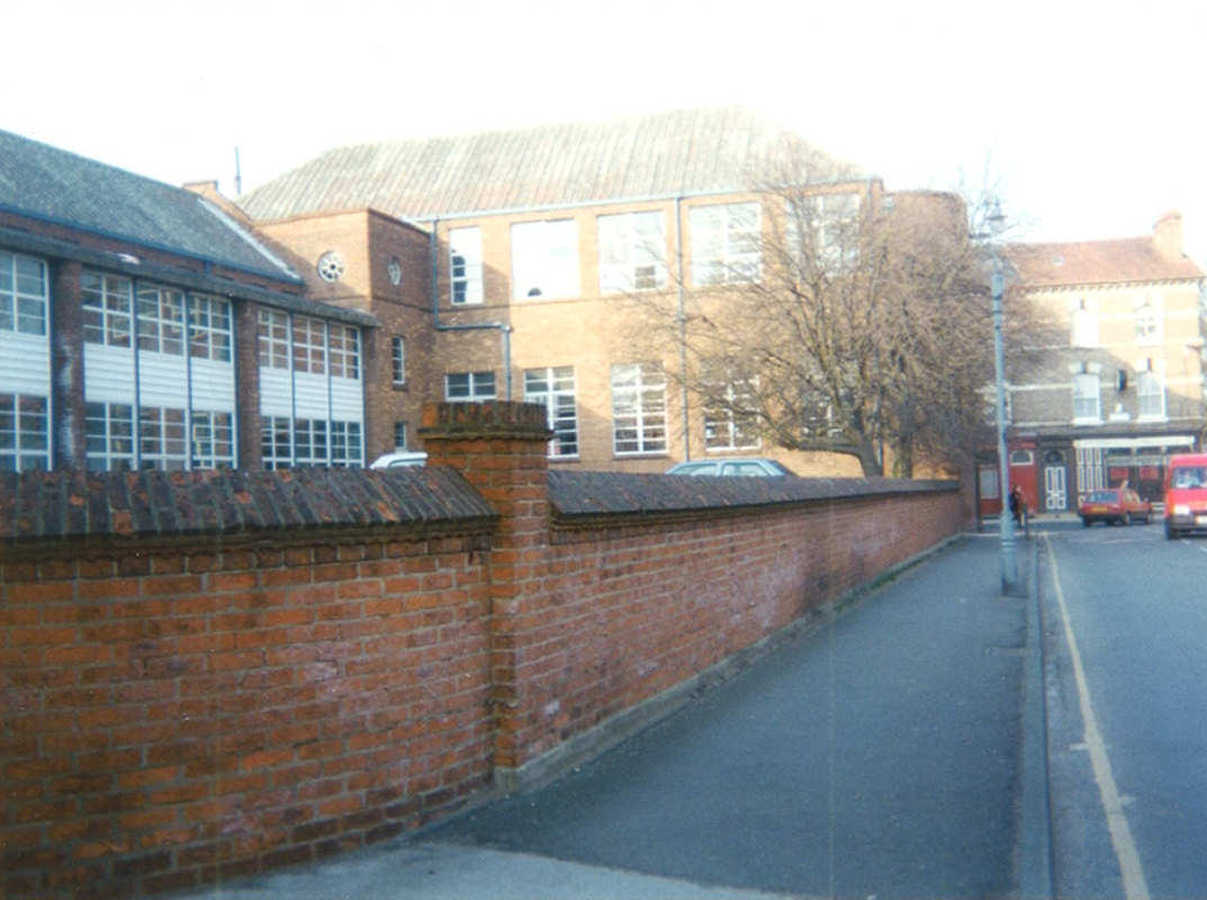
- St George's Secondary School In Margaret Street, York

Location
- Margaret Street; York, North Yorkshire; England

Information
- Type: Secondary School
- Motto: Signum Fidei
- Age: 11 to 16

St George's Secondary School was a RC boys' secondary modern school in York, North Yorkshire, England.

== History of St George's ==
Between 1927 and 1932 the original St George's School in Margaret Street was reorganized into 3 departments: Senior Boys, Mixed, and Infants. A new building for the senior boys located next to the Primary school was begun in 1939 and opened in 1948. Both schools became voluntary aided schools and by 1956 240 children were enrolled in the primary school and 290 boys in the secondary modern school. Discussion on the reorganisation of York's Catholic Senior schools in the late 1970s resulted in the closure of the Senior school in 1985. The buildings remained derelict for many years until they were demolished in 1996 to make way for housing. The school became All Saints RC School with its site moving to Nunnery Lane and Mill Mount respectively.

Always known in York for the success of its Rugby, Football, and Cricket teams. Many pupils went on to achieve success as professional sportsmen. One teacher even became Lord Mayor of York (David Wilde 1994–5).

From the 1930s until the 1970s the Headmaster and (usually) two more teachers were members of the De La Salle Brothers.

== Alumni ==
- David Bradley (English actor)
