= Earl of Traquair =

Earldom of Traquair
- Blazon: Arms: Quarterly: 1st, Or a Fess chequy Argent and Azure (Stewart); 2nd, Azure three Garbs Or (Buchan); 3rd, Sable a Mullet Argent (Traquair); 4th, Argent an Orle Gules in chief three Martlets Sable beaked of the second (Rutherford).; Crests: On a Garb Or a Crow proper.; Supporters: On either side a Bear proper armed Argent
- Creation date: 23 Jun 1633
- Creation: First
- Created by: Charles I
- Peerage: Peerage of Scotland
- First holder: John Stewart, 1st Earl of Traquair
- Last holder: Charles Stewart, 8th Earl of Traquair
- Remainder to: the 1st Earl's heirs male of the body lawfully begotten
- Subsidiary titles: Lord Stewart of Traquair; Lord Linton and Caberston
- Status: Extinct
- Extinction date: 2 August 1861
- Seat: Traquair House
- Motto: JUDGE NOUGHT

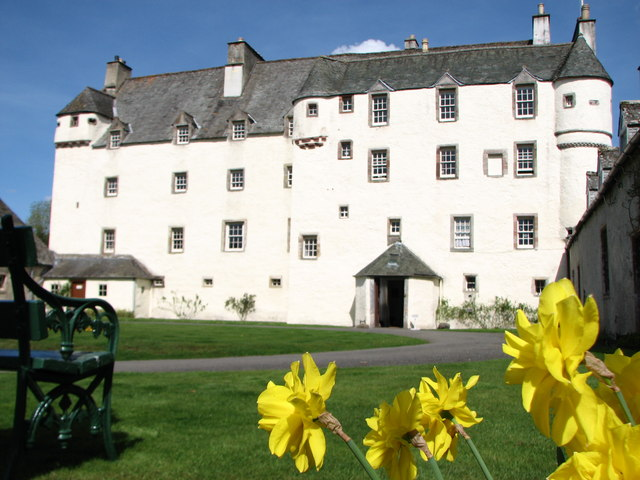
Traquair House - geograph.org.uk - 1193717

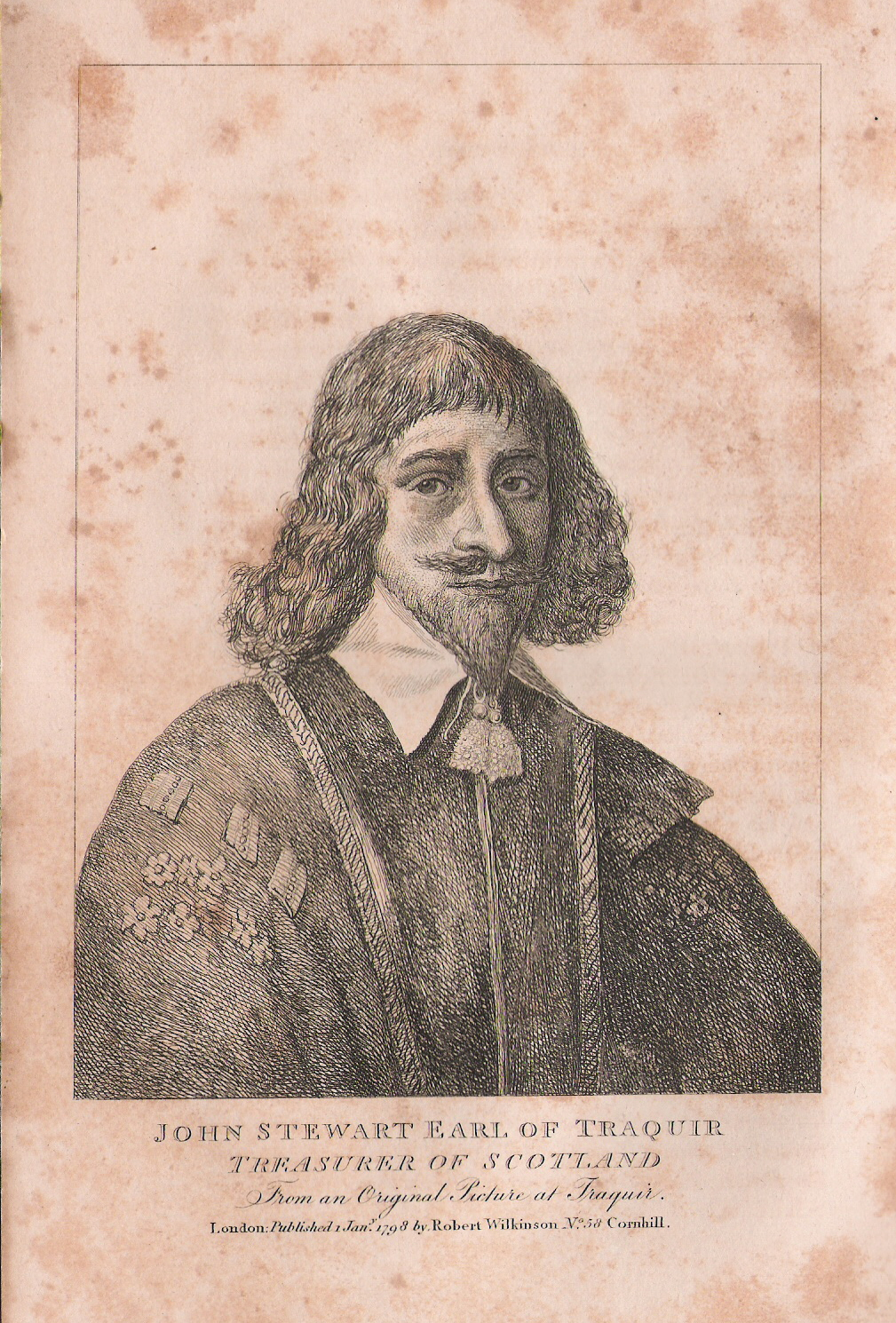
John Stewart, 1st Earl of Traquair.

Earl of Traquair (pronounced "Tra-quare") was a title in the Peerage of Scotland. It was created on 23 June 1633 for John Stewart, Lord Stewart of Traquair.

The family seat was Traquair House.

Stewart had been created Lord Stewart of Traquair in 1628, and was made Lord Linton and Caberston at the same time as he was given the earldom in 1633. These titles were also in the Peerage of Scotland. The titles became extinct or dormant on the death of the 8th Earl of Traquair, Charles Stewart (b. 1781), 2 August 1861.

== Earls of Traquair (1633-1861) ==
- John Stewart, 1st Earl of Traquair (~1600–1659)
- John Stewart, 2nd Earl of Traquair (1624–1666)
- William Stewart, 3rd Earl of Traquair (1657–1673) (succeeded by his brother)
- Charles Stewart, 4th Earl of Traquair (1659–1741); m. Lady Mary Maxwell. 17 children (born between 1695 and 1711) all of whom survived to adulthood.
- Charles Stewart, 5th Earl of Traquair (1697–1764) (succeeded by his brother); imprisoned after the Jacobite rising of 1745.
- John Stewart, 6th Earl of Traquair (1699–1779); his daughter Christina married Cyrus Griffin, last President of the Continental Congress
- Charles Stewart, 7th Earl of Traquair FRSE (Lord Linton) (1746–1827); m. Mary Ravenscroft
- Charles Stewart, 8th Earl of Traquair (1781–1861)

== Significant Events ==
Stewart v. Riddoch, Scottish Court of Session (1675).
