= Millthorpe School =

Secondary School in South Bank, York, North Yorkshire, England

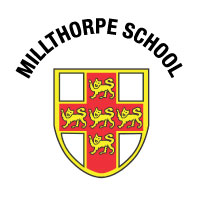

Location
- Nunthorpe Avenue; York, North Yorkshire, YO23 1WF; England; 53°56′56″N 1°05′26″W

Information
- Type: Academy
- Established: 1920
- Local authority: City of York Council
- Department for Education URN: 142648 Tables
- Ofsted: Reports
- Principal: Kavina Rothenburg
- Gender: Mixed
- Age: 11 to 16
- Enrolment: 1,021
- Former name: Nunthorpe Grammar School
- Website: http://www.millthorpeschool.co.uk

Millthorpe School is a mixed secondary school located in York, North Yorkshire, England.

It is situated in South Bank, York, and can be accessed via Scarcroft Road (the A59). It is close to two primary schools, Scarcroft Primary School and Knavesmire Primary School.

== History ==
Millthorpe School is the successor to Nunthorpe Grammar School, one of two single sex male state grammar schools in the City of York, which opened in 1920, and Mill Mount Grammar School for girls, whose pupils moved to the Nunthorpe site.

=== Nunthorpe Grammar School ===
Nunthorpe Grammar School was centred on Nunthorpe Court, a large Victorian house built in 1856. The house was adapted to meet its new role as a school in 1920.

At first the school was entirely contained within the mansion. Now the house is used purely for offices and staff rooms, the Headteacher’s office being situated in what was the main bedroom. Sports fields were created by the draining of an ornamental lake. The school was added to at various stages as it grew in popularity. In 1927 a new wing was opened, containing four new classrooms, an art room, two storerooms and a cloakroom. The stableboys’ sleeping quarters from the old house were converted into a new school library. The stables themselves were converted into two laboratories. Even the stable yard was pressed into service. It was roofed over and became the assembly hall, and later still the school’s dining room as it still is to this day. The current hall and the completion of the quadrangle classrooms came in 1937. In 1959 the gym was added as well as what was for the next 25 years to be known as the "new block", the building containing laboratories and classrooms. A Sixth Form block was added in 1974, although this block is now used for science laboratories and languages classrooms. In 1984 a new sports hall was built.

=== Mill Mount Grammar School for Girls ===
This was a girls' grammar school on Mill Mount Lane, also known as Mill Mount Girls' Grammar School. Until 1974 it was administered by the City of York Education Committee, then North Yorkshire County Council until 1985. In 1965 there was a plan to turn York comprehensive by 1970, with Nunthorpe and Mill Mount joining to become a sixth form college, and the two other grammar schools becoming a comprehensive. In 1985, due to the acquisition of the site by All Saints RC School, the building was repurposed into the catholic school's upper site, in order to allow the restructuring of catholic secondary education in the Vale of York. Students not wishing to attend the catholic school attended the newly formed Millthorpe Comprehensive.

=== Millthorpe Comprehensive ===
Millthorpe Comprehensive School opened in 1985 when the city changed over to a comprehensive system. After local government reform in 1996 authority for the school was transferred to City of York Council.

=== Specialist School Programme ===
Millthorpe School was formerly a Language College which was part of the Specialist schools programme. This meant that it received extra funding for language teaching. It no longer holds this title as the programme was abolished.

=== Academy status ===
Millthorpe School converted to academy status in April 2016. the school now forms part of the South Bank Multi-Academy Trust, which also includes Knavesmire Primary School and Scarcroft Primary School. However Millthorpe School continues to coordinate with City of York Council for admissions.

== Academic performance ==
The school gets above-average GCSE results.

== Notable former pupils ==
- Julian Fell, winner of the 48th edition of Channel 4 TV show Countdown
- Peter Gibson (1929–2016), glazier who worked on all of York Minster's stained-glass windows

=== Nunthorpe Grammar School for Boys ===
These names are according to year(s) spent at the school, starting with the earliest. Undated alumni are at the end in alphabetic order.

- Charles Whiting [1938–45], author who also published under the pseudonyms Leo Kessler, Duncan Harding and John Kerrigan.
- David Reeder [1942–49], historian of education and town planning.
- Vince Cable [1954–62, and Head Boy 1962-3], Liberal Democrat MP from 1997 until 2015 for Twickenham and Secretary of State for Business, Innovation and Skills (2010-2015)
- Steve McClaren [1972–77], former England football manager.
- Mark Addy [1975–80], actor
- Marco Gabbiadini [1979–84], ex-professional footballer.
- Liam D'Arcy Brown, travel-writer
- Nick Miller, BBC weather forecaster

=== Mill Mount Grammar School for Girls ===
- Sue Doughty (née Powell), former Liberal Democrat MP for Guildford (1959–66)
- Karen Jones CBE, founder of the Café Rouge restaurant chain, and Chief Executive of Spirit Pubs (part of Punch Taverns since 2006) from 2002–6, and now owner of Food & Fuel Pubs (1967–74)
