= Tricia Walker =

British writer (1964–2018)

- Born: Patricia Margaret Walker; 8 February 1964; Northallerton, England
- Died: 8 January 2018 (aged 53)
- Occupation: Author
- Writing career
- Period: 2007–18
- Genre: Contemporary fiction
- Notable work: Benedict's Brother
- Website: www.triciawalker.co.uk

Patricia Margaret Walker (8 February 1964 – 8 January 2018), better known as Tricia Walker, was a contemporary British author, best known for her debut novel Benedict's Brother, which was voted 'Book of the Year' by Publishing News and was the best-selling launch by an unknown debut author for Borders in 2007.

The book follows the journey of a young woman, Benedict, who inherits money from her uncle, a deceased Japanese prisoner of war who was posted in Thailand. Like the protagonist in the book, Walker used the money she inherited from her own POW uncle, Ernest Taylor, to discover what happened to him and also visit her brother who is a Buddhist monk in Thailand.

Walker was the daughter of author Peter Walker, who wrote more than 130 books (under six pseudonyms). Under the pseudonym Nicholas Rhea he wrote the popular Constable series, which was the inspiration behind the successful British TV police drama Heartbeat, which was broadcast on ITV in 18 series from 1992–2010.

Benedict's Brother launched as an eBook on all major platforms on 18 November 2013. A motion picture based on the book was in development.

== Early life and education ==
Tricia Walker was born in Northallerton, North Yorkshire, to author Peter Walker and his wife Rhoda (née Smith). She was the third of four children. Walker had a rural upbringing in a small village.

Growing up in a Roman Catholic household, she chose the name Benedict (after St.Benedict of Nursia) as her confirmation name. She went to secondary school at Bar Convent in York, and was a weekly boarder. After completing her BA Honours in Humanities from Middlesex University (formerly Middlesex Polytechnic) in London, she worked for a brief while in marketing.

== Benedict's Brother ==
=== Inspiration behind the book ===
In her early thirties, Walker went to visit her brother who is a Buddhist monk in Thailand. The seed of the story came from her quest to find out what happened to her uncle, who left her £5000, which she used to make the trip. In similar vein, the opening line of Benedict's Brother reads: "Today, my great uncle left me one hundred and thirty-nine thousand pounds. I've no idea what to do with it".

In hindsight, Walker realised the journey to Thailand was her own way of coping with the death of a close childhood friend at the time. The physical setting and scenario of her journey is captured through the book but the story has been fictionalised for impact. She did not find out what eventually happened to her uncle, a prisoner of war held hostage on the River Kwai, in Thailand. Through research, she found out that his regiment were captured in Singapore, some of whom were sent to Thailand, while her uncle and others were sent to Taiwan.

Scottish crime writer, Val McDermid, a friend of Walker's father, mentored Walker on the draft of Benedict's Brother. After two years, the initial manuscript was rejected in 1999. Her agent suggested she get started on her next book, which she did.

Seven years later (in 2006) while housesitting for her sister who was away on holiday, Tricia decided to post the first 10 pages of the book on her newly created Blogger account. She had only just heard of blogging and decided to use the platform as a means for promoting her story.

=== Publishing Benedict's Brother ===
It was 16 August when Walker published the first post – the month that coincides with the opening chapter of the book that begins in August and finishes in January. Her only means of promoting her blog was an email sent to 30 friends. While she kept adding new posts, she steadily gained a stream of dedicated worldwide Blogger followers. Her mother was proofreading the content and her sister was editing it.

The entire book was published on Walker's blog between August 2006 to January 2007. Readers of the blog encouraged her to publish a book version.

She decided to apply to the Arts Council England which gave her £5000 to launch the paperback of Benedict's Brother. The book was published by Coppice Publishing in Yorkshire. The first print run of 1000 copies sold out in six months.

In December 2007, the year it was first released, Benedict's Brother was awarded a Book of the Year selection by Publishing News. The book was also the biggest-selling launch for an unknown debut author for Borders in 2007.

The eBook of Benedict's Brother was launched on 18 November 2013 on all major online platforms and a special commemorative edition launched in 2015 in partnership with The Royal British Legion charity.

=== Benedict's Brother – The film ===
Benedict's Brother was a project being developed as a feature film in 2018 with Walker taking a key role as executive producer and script consultant. Filming was scheduled to start in York and Thailand in 2018. As of June 2021, there have not been any updates on the film.

== Death ==
In 2009, Walker was diagnosed with breast cancer for which she had surgery and radiotherapy. In December 2017 she was diagnosed with a rare and aggressive form of sarcoma and died, aged 53, on 8 January 2018.
