= St Francis Xavier School, North Yorkshire =

St Francis Xavier School
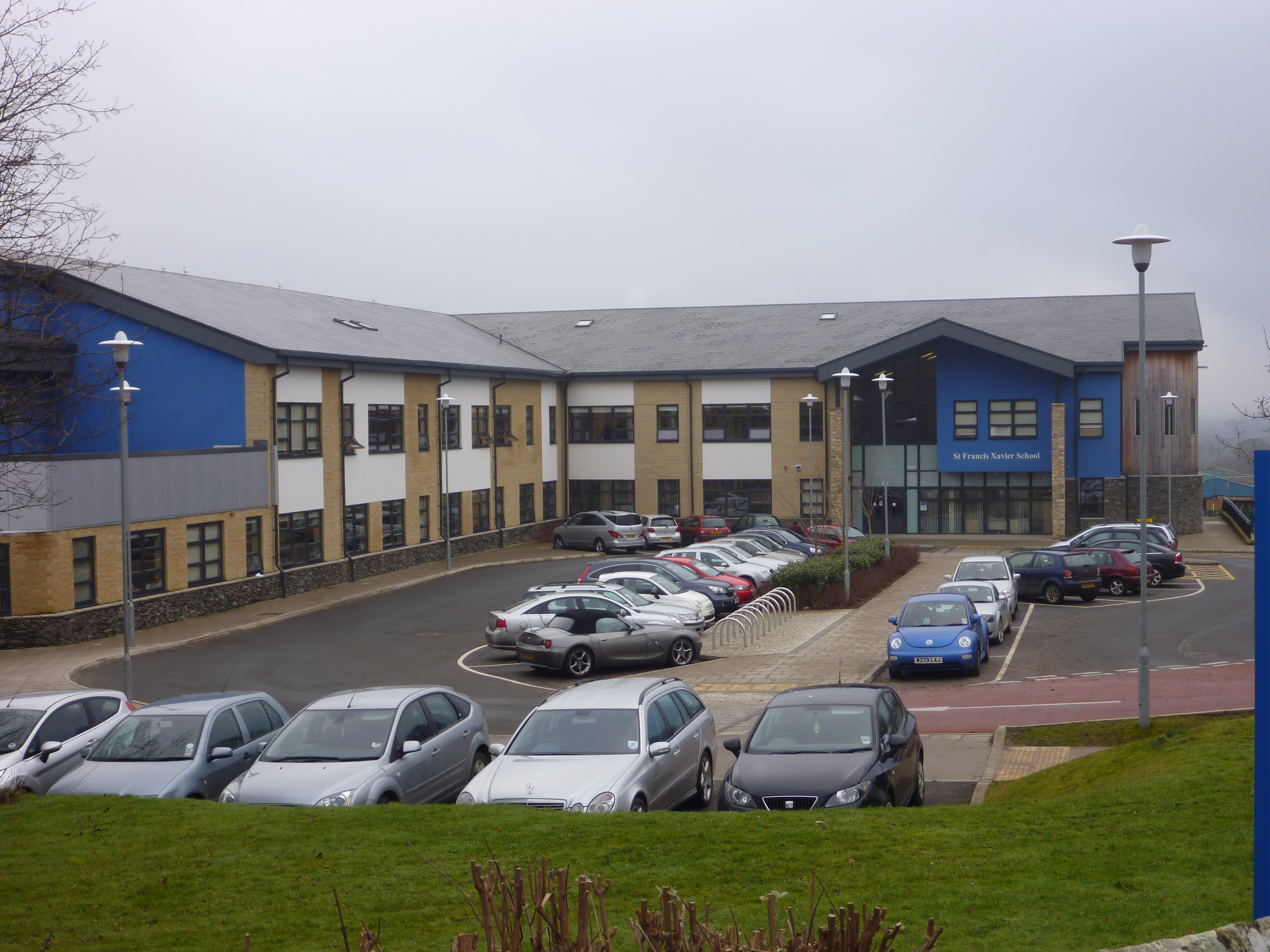

Location
- Darlington Road; Richmond, North Yorkshire, DL10 7DA; England; 54.4093°N 1.7190°W

Information
- Type: Academy
- Motto: Gratia perficit naturam (grace perfects nature)
- Religious affiliation: Roman Catholic/Church of England
- Local authority: North Yorkshire
- Trust: Nicholas Postgate Catholic Academy Trust
- Department for Education URN: 147213 Tables
- Ofsted: Reports
- Executive Headteacher: Jacqueline Prime
- Gender: Coeducational
- Age: 11 to 16
- Enrolment: 617
- Capacity: 488
- Website: www.sfxschool.org.uk

St. Francis Xavier School is a coeducational secondary school situated on Darlington Road, Richmond, North Yorkshire, England. It is a joint Roman Catholic and Church of England school, serving children and young people aged 11–16 from both denominations and other backgrounds. The headteacher is J. Prime.

Previously a voluntary aided school administered by North Yorkshire County Council, in June 2019 St Francis Xavier School converted to academy status. The school is part of a multi-academy trust, Nicholas Postgate Catholic Academy Trust.

== Ofsted and accolades ==
The school was last inspected by Ofsted in November 2024. The judgement was that the school was Outstanding in all areas. In 2026, the school was rated as the best out of 41 secondary schools in North Yorkshire by FindGreatSchools website.
