= Traquair House =

Converted tower house in Traquair, Scottish Borders

Coordinates: 55°36′30″N 03°03′50″W

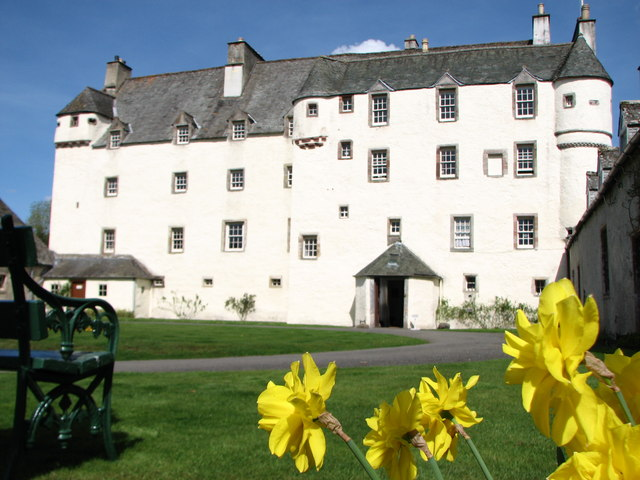
- Pictured in 2008
- Interactive map of the Traquair House area

General information
- Location: Peebles, Scotland

Website
- https://www.traquair.co.uk/

Inventory of Gardens and Designed Landscapes in Scotland
- Official name: Traquair House
- Designated: 1 July 1987
- Reference no.: GDL00378

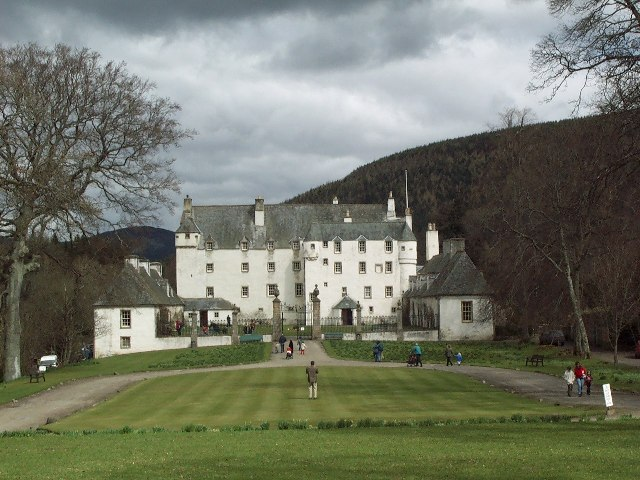
Traquair House

Traquair House, approximately 7 miles southeast of Peebles, is claimed to be the oldest continually inhabited house in Scotland. Whilst not strictly a castle, it is built in the style of a fortified mansion. It pre-dates the Scottish Baronial style of architecture, and may have been one of the influences on this style. The estate contains the famous Traquair Brewery.

== History ==
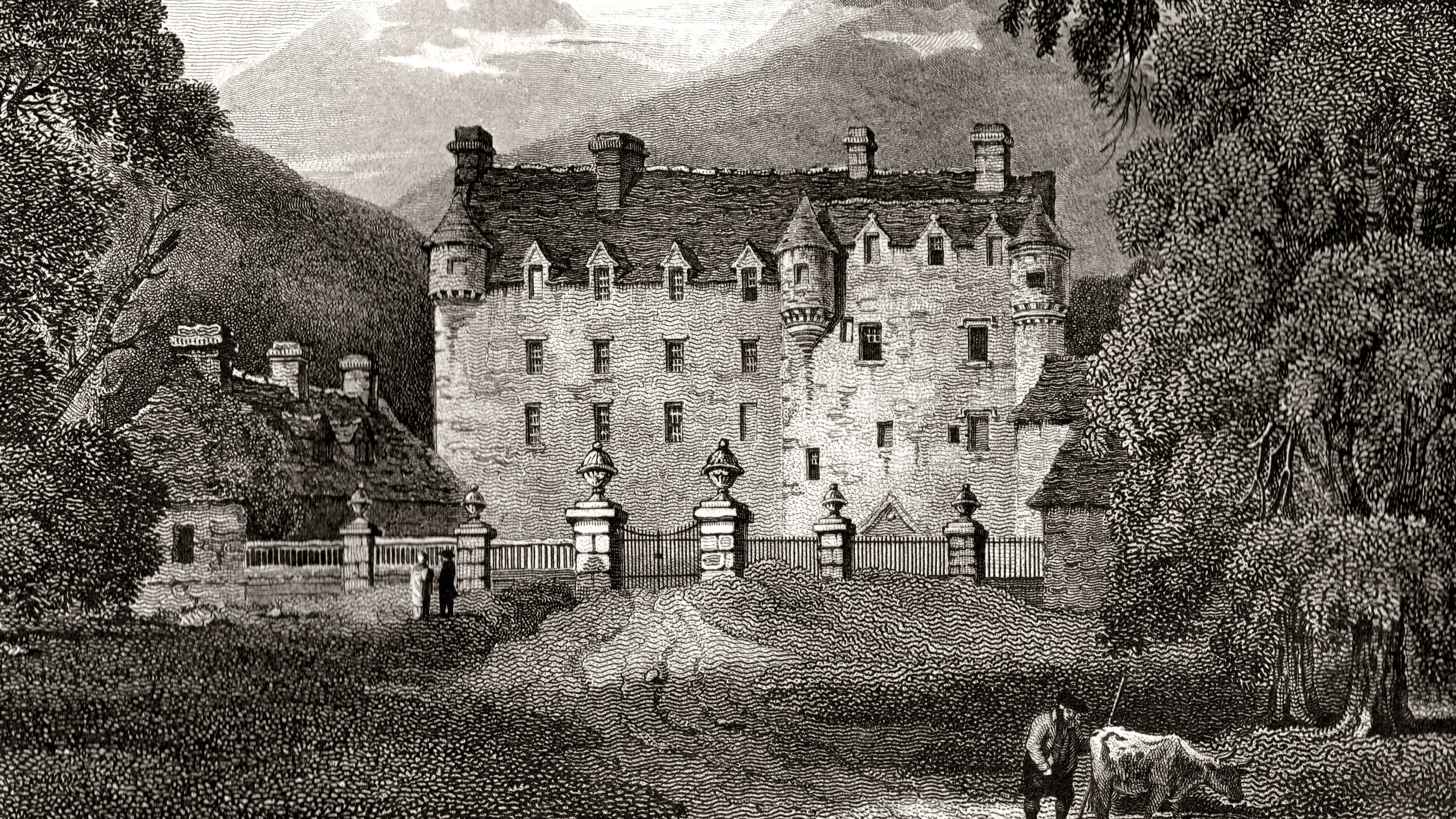
Traquair House in 1814

The house is built on the site of a hunting seat used by the Scottish kings from the 12th century, though no part of the present building can be dated with certainty before the 15th century. Alexander I was the first Scottish king to stay and hunt at Traquair. At that time it was a remote "castle", surrounded by forest. Upon Alexander III's death in 1286, the peace of the Borders region was shattered and Traquair became a key link in the chain of defence that guarded the Tweed Valley against English invasion.

Over the next two centuries Traquair's ownership changed often, at times coming under the control of the English, and at others, the Scottish throne. In the 1460s James III conferred the estate on Dr William Rogers, an eminent musician, and one of his favourites. After holding the lands for upwards of nine years, Dr Rogers sold them for an insignificant sum in 1478 to the Earl of Buchan. The Earl gifted the estate to his illegitimate son, James Stuart (1480–1513), 1st Laird of Traquair, in 1491. James Stuart obtained letters of legitimation and married the heiress of the Rutherfords, with whom he received the estates of Rutherford and Wells in Roxburghshire. He was killed at the Battle of Flodden in 1513. His daughter, Jane Stewart, had a daughter Janet with the Earl of Angus born out of wedlock, who married Patrick Ruthven, 3rd Lord Ruthven. Traquair remained the family seat of the Earls of Traquair for the next four centuries.

Mary, Queen of Scots, visited Traquair in August 1566. James VI came to Traquair on 9 March 1602.

In 1875, Traquair passed to a cousin of the Stuarts, Henry Constable Maxwell. He was a direct descendant, but via the female line. The National Portrait Gallery holds a 1992 portrait of Catherine Maxwell Stuart, 21st Lady of Traquair.

== Features ==
Traquair is a 50-room house. The rooms include "The Drawing Room", containing ancestral portraits and photographs of the current residents; "The Dressing Room", which is decorated to demonstrate life in former times; "The Museum Room", containing a mural dating from 1530, one of the oldest to survive in a secular building in Scotland, as well as charters stamped with the royal seals and signatures of the Scottish Kings; "The King's Room", where Mary, Queen of Scots stayed in 1566 and which contains some relics belonging to her and the Jacobites, such as her rosary, crucifix, purse, a silk quilt, and letters bearing her signature; "The Still Room", where breakfast is taken among the 18th-century porcelain that decorates the shelves; and "The Dining Room", one of the last additions to the house, built in the late 17th century. There is a Roman Catholic chapel built in 1829, following the Catholic emancipation. The 18th-century library contains more than 3,000 volumes. Although three lairds made alterations to the house prior to the 17th century, Traquair has changed little, architecturally, since then.

=== Bear Gates ===
The Bear Gates at the main entrance to the grounds were installed by the fifth Earl, Charles Stuart, in 1738. The mason was John Burns and the ironwork was by Daniel Aitken. The stone bears were added in 1745, being made at Penicuik quarry. by sculptor George Jamesone at a cost of £126 Scots. RCAHMS state that the gates were sealed in 1796 on the death of the Countess of Traquair, with the 7th Earl vowing to keep them sealed.

A more romantic (but impossible) version, states that they were closed, after Charles Edward Stuart (Bonnie Prince Charlie) passed through in 1745, the Earl vowed they would never be opened again until a Stuart king returned.

== Tam Lin (film) ==
The 1970 horror film Tam Lin was filmed at Traquair. It starred Ava Gardner; other cast members included Joanna Lumley, Stephanie Beecham and Ian McShane.

== Brewery ==
The Traquair House Brewery was revived in 1965 by Peter Maxwell Stuart, the 20th Laird of Traquair, using the 18th-century domestic brewery equipment that had previously been used to make beer for the house. Ale is fermented in the original oak tuns, some of which are over 200 years old. The brewery makes a range of beers, though the two main brands are Jacobite Ale and House Ale.

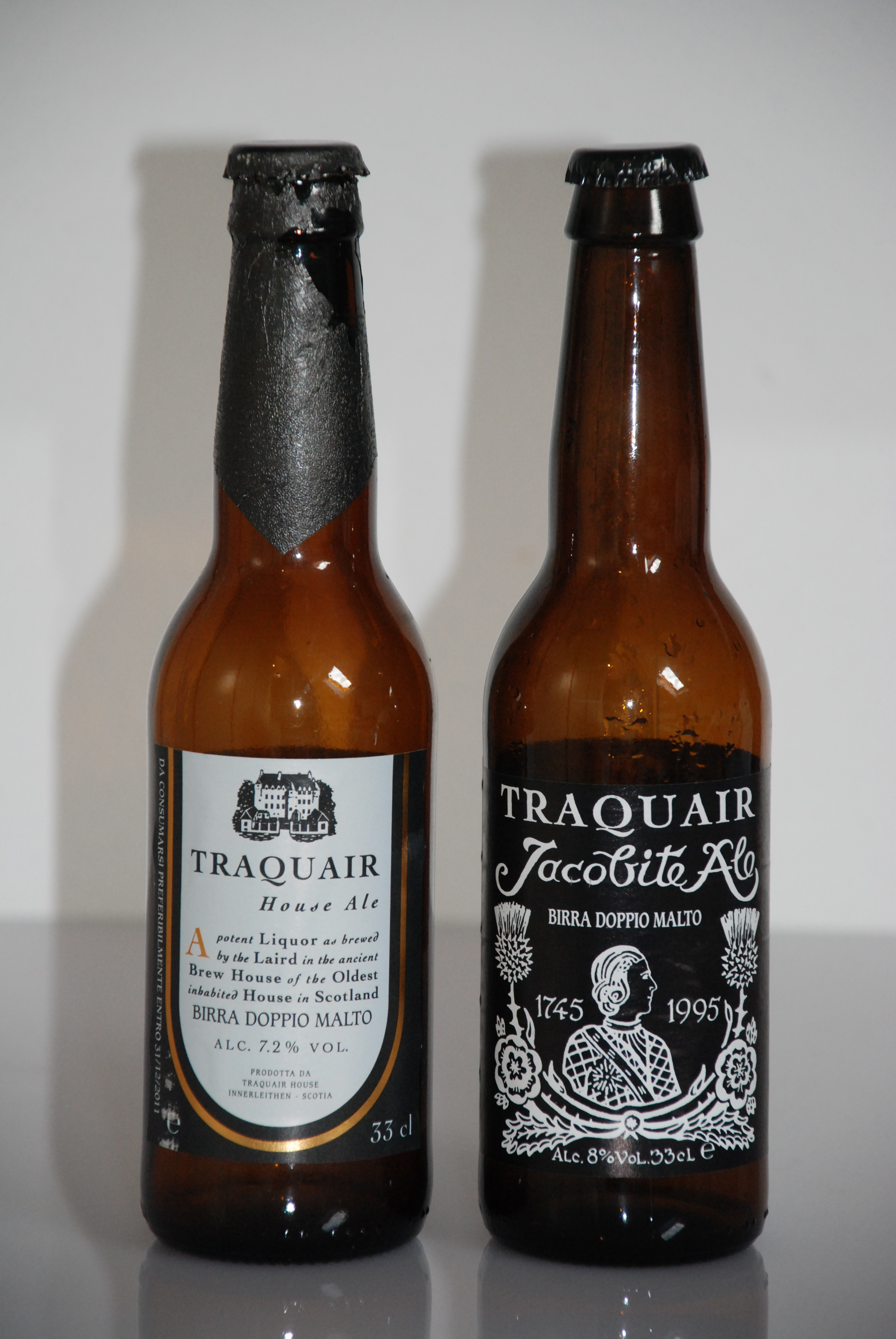
Traquair House Ale

Ale was brewed at Traquair during the reign of Mary, Queen of Scots. In 1739, a 200-gallon copper was installed in the brew house under the chapel.

== The Maze ==
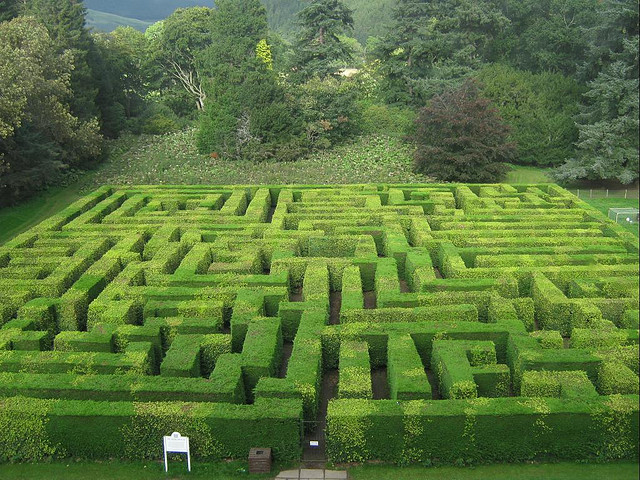
Traquair House Maze

The maze was designed by John Schofield and originally planted with Leyland cypress until the severe winter in 1983 when over two thirds of the trees died. It was replanted with hardier beech trees.

== See also ==
- Earl of Traquair
