= Shipley Erskine, 14th Earl of Buchan =

Scottish nobleman (1850–1934)

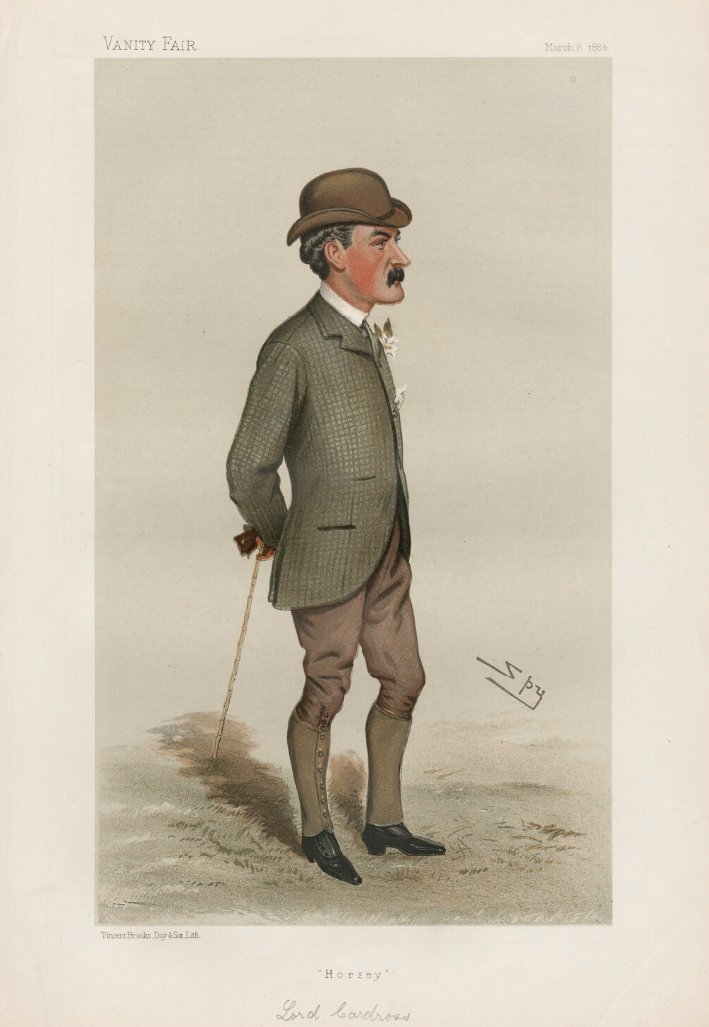
"Horsey". Caricature by Spy published in Vanity Fair in 1884

Shipley Gordon Stuart Erskine, 14th Earl of Buchan, JP, DL (27 February 1850 – 16 April 1934), styled Lord Cardross from 1857 until 1898, was a Scottish nobleman and racehorse owner.

== Biography ==
Cardross was the eldest son of David Stuart Erskine, 13th Earl of Buchan and Agnes Graham Smith, daughter of James Smith, of Craigend Castle, Stirlingshire. He was named after his great-grandfather, Maj.-Gen. Sir Charles Shipley. He was educated at Harrow.

Buchan was Conservative in politics but spent most of his life involved in equestrian and leisurely pursuits. He was thoroughly involved with the turf, owning several notable racehorses, and spent much time at Newmarket. While there he resided at his Exning estate. In 1911 he acquired 4,000 acres of farmland in Nyeri.

Buchan was a member and supporter of the antisemitic group "The Britons", donating the equivalent of £2000 in 1922.

Buchan held the office of Justice of the peace and Deputy lieutenant for both Cambridgeshire and Linlithgowshire. He owned 3,000 acres in Linlithgowshire and Midlothian.

He died on 16 April 1934 in Chelsea, London.

== Family ==
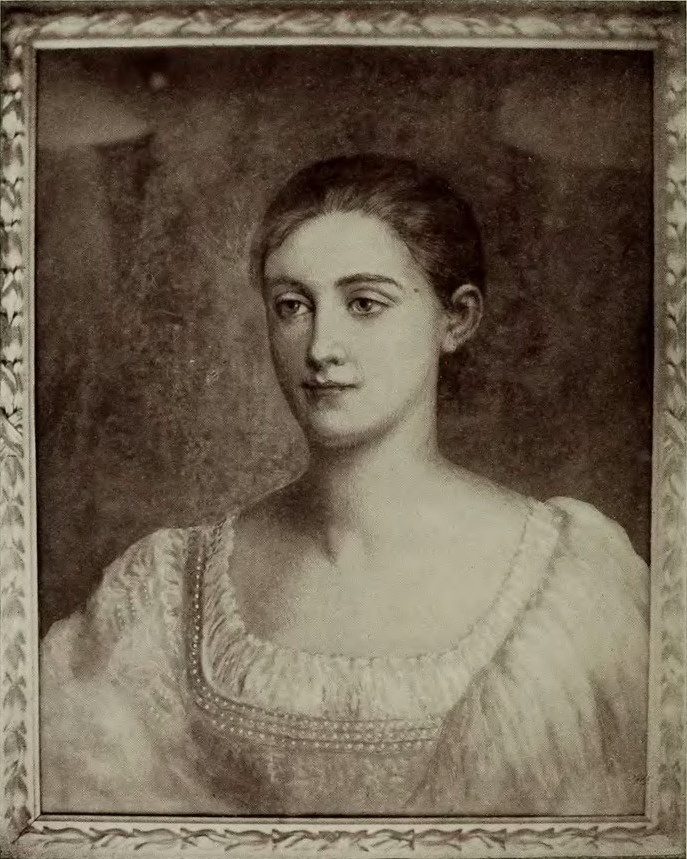
Rosalie Sartoris, Countess of Buchan

On 9 November 1876, Cardross married Rosalie Louise Sartoris (1859–1943), daughter of Capt. Jules-Alexandre Sartoris, of Hopsford Hall, Coventry, son of the Swiss Huguenot banker Peter Urban Sartoris. They had four children:

- Ronald Douglas Stuart Mar Erskine, 15th Earl of Buchan (1878–1960), styled Lord Cardross from 1898 until 1934, died unmarried
- Lady Muriel Agnes Stuart Erskine (1879–1967), married Hon. Charles Heathcote-Drummond-Willoughby
- Lady Marjorie Gladys Stuart Erskine (1880–1910), died unmarried at Aviemore after having been missing for several weeks
- Lady Evelyn Hilda Stuart Erskine (1883–1939), married Walter Guinness, 1st Baron Moyne, who was assassinated in 1944

Lady Cardross, as La Duchesse de Lavis, attended the Devonshire House Ball of 1897. She was a famed beauty; likewise, Lord Cardross was known as the "Pocket Adonis". She died on 29 January 1943 at Almondell House, near Broxburn, Linlithgowshire.

== See also ==
- Earl of Buchan
- Clan Erskine

Peerage of Scotland
Preceded by David Stuart Erskine	Earl of Buchan; 1898–1934	Succeeded by Ronald Douglas Stuart Mar Erskine
