= David Erskine, 13th Earl of Buchan =

British aristocrat

David Stuart Erskine, 13th Earl of Buchan, DL (6 November 1815 – 3 December 1899), was a British Army officer and equestrian. He was the son of Henry Erskine, 12th Earl of Buchan and Elizabeth Shipley, daughter of Sir Charles Shipley.

== Career ==
Erskine, whilst still Lord Cardross, entered the 35th (Royal Sussex) Regiment of Foot and rose to the rank of Captain. He succeeded his father on his death in 1857 and was appointed Deputy lieutenant of Linlithgowshire. He was a professional jockey.

== Personal life ==
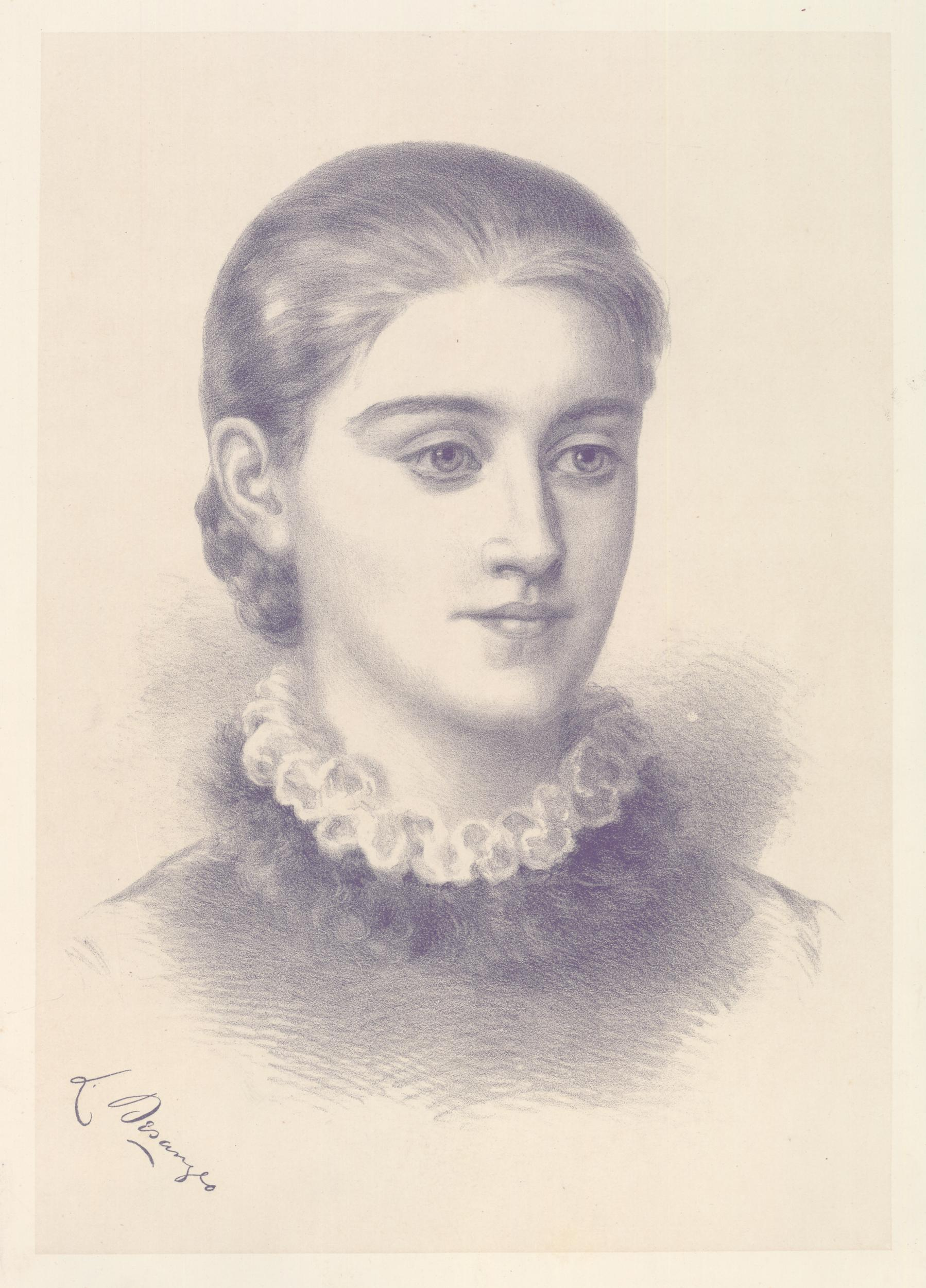
Maria, Countess of Buchan

Erskine married Agnes Graham Smith, daughter of James Smith, Esq. of Craigend, Stirlingshire, on 27 April 1849; they had two sons:

- Shipley Gordon Stuart Erskine, 14th Earl of Buchan (1850–1934)
- Hon. Albany Mar Stuart Erskine (1852–1933)

His first wife died in 1875 and Lord Buchan remarried on 17 July 1876 to Maria James (1818–1899), daughter of Lt.-Col. William James.

Erskine lived at West Hagbourne Manor, Didcot, Oxfordshire. He was declared bankrupt in 1894 at the sum of £388 after having passed on his estates in Linlithgow to his son, Lord Cardross, later the 14th Earl of Buchan.

Erskine died aged 83 on 3 December 1898. Before his death he had converted to Roman Catholicism.

Peerage of Scotland
Preceded by Henry Erskine	Earl of Buchan; 1857-1898	Succeeded by Shipley Erskine
