= Thomas Erskine, 1st Baron Erskine =

British politician

The Right Honourable The Lord Erskine KT PC
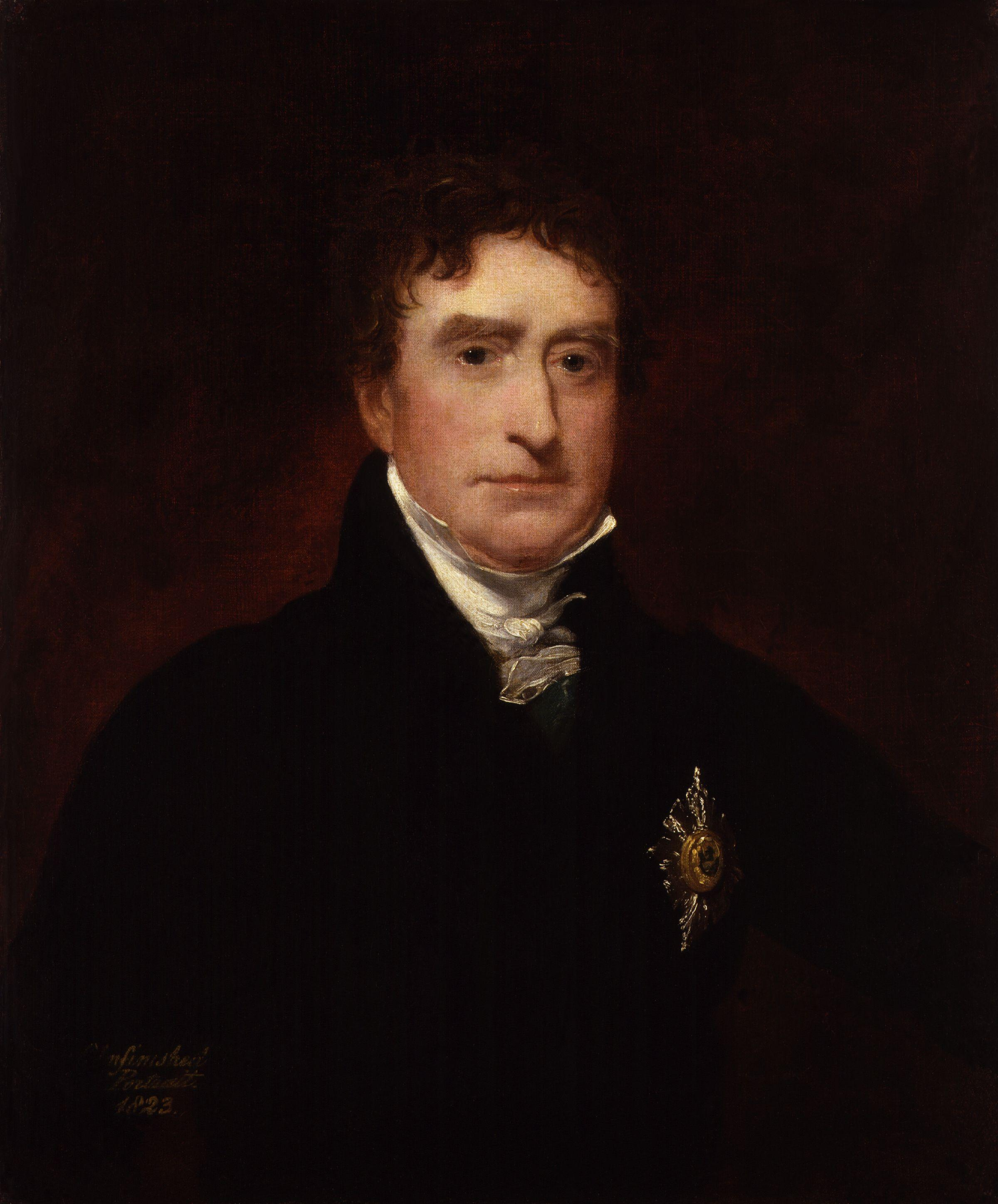
- Portrait by William Charles Ross

Lord Chancellor Lord High Steward for the trial of: List: The Viscount Melville
- In office 7 February 1806 – 1 April 1807
- Monarch: George III
- Prime Minister: The Lord Grenville
- Preceded by: The Lord Eldon
- Succeeded by: The Lord Eldon

Member of Parliament for Portsmouth
- In office 1790–1806
- Preceded by: William Cornwallis
- Succeeded by: David Montagu Erskine

Personal details
- Born: 10 January 1750 Edinburgh, Scotland
- Died: 17 November 1823 (aged 73) Almondell, West Lothian, Scotland
- Party: Whig
- Spouse(s): (1) Frances Moore (d. 1805) (2) Sarah Buck (d. 1856)
- Education: Trinity College, Cambridge

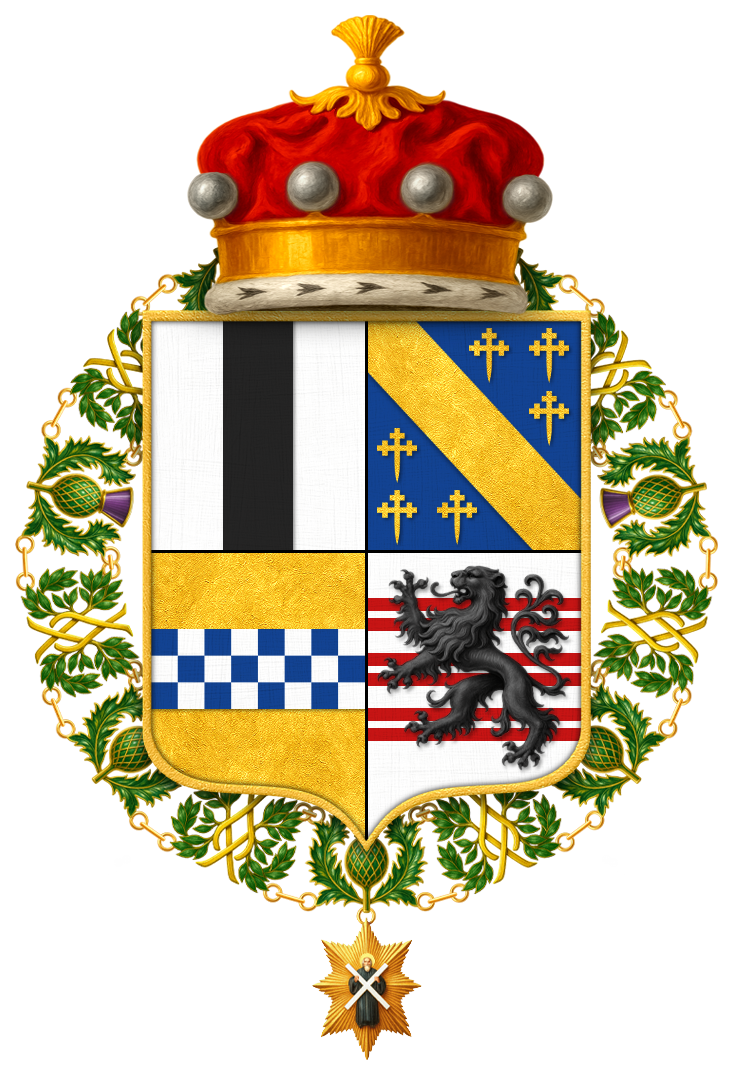
Shield of Arms of Thomas Erskine, 1st Baron Erskine, KT, PC

Thomas Erskine, 1st Baron Erskine, KT, PC (10 January 1750 – 17 November 1823) was a British lawyer and Whig politician who served as Lord High Chancellor of Great Britain from 1806 to 1807 in the Ministry of All the Talents.

The youngest son of the 10th Earl of Buchan, Erskine had brief careers in the Royal Navy and British Army before gaining a degree at Trinity College, Cambridge. Called to the Bar in 1778, he soon established a profitable legal practice. He achieved widespread recognition for his successful defence of radicals, including Thomas Paine, John Horne Tooke, and Thomas Hardy, who were accused of seditious libel and treason. He sat as a member of parliament for Portsmouth from 1783 to 1784 and from 1790 to 1806, though his parliamentary contributions were less acclaimed than his advocacy in court. He was appointed Lord Chancellor in 1806 and created Baron Erskine of Restormel.

Following his departure from office when the ministry fell in 1807, Erskine was not permitted as ex-chancellor to return to legal practice but remained active in the House of Lords. Among the causes he took up in his retirement was animal welfare; he introduced a bill in the House of Lords for the prevention of cruelty to animals. Erskine, who was married twice and had eleven children, died in 1823 at the home of his brother's widow at Almondell in West Lothian and was buried nearby at Uphall.

== Background and childhood ==
Erskine was the third and youngest surviving son of Henry David Erskine, 10th Earl of Buchan and Agnes Steuart, the daughter of Sir James Steuart, solicitor general for Scotland. His older brothers were David (Lord Cardross and later the 11th Earl of Buchan) and Henry (later Lord Advocate of Scotland). His elder sister was Lady Anne Agnes Erskine who was involved with the evangelical Methodists of Countess of Huntingdon's Connexion.

Erskine was born in a tenement at the head of South Grays Close on the High Street in Edinburgh. His mother undertook much of her children's education as the family, though noble, were not rich. The family moved to St Andrews, where they could live more cheaply, and Erskine attended the grammar school there. The family's money having been spent on the education of his older brothers, Erskine, aged fourteen, reluctantly abandoned his formal education for the time being and went to sea as a midshipman. His family meanwhile moved to Bath to become members of the Methodist community headed by Selina, Countess of Huntingdon. Erskine's sister Anne Agnes, was to become treasurer of Selina's charities.

== Navy, army and legal studies ==
Erskine went to sea as a midshipman in the Tartar, under captain Sir David Lindsay, who was a nephew of Lord Mansfield and a friend of the Erskine family. The Tartar set sail for the Caribbean, where Erskine was to spend the next four years, rising to the rank of acting lieutenant. When Erskine was eighteen he resigned from the Navy. His ship had been paid off, there were no commissions available, and he didn't want to return to sea as a midshipman after having been an acting lieutenant. The 10th Earl of Buchan had recently died, and Erskine now had just enough money to buy a commission in the army, becoming an ensign in the 1st (Royal) Regiment of Foot. He was stationed first at Berwick-upon-Tweed and then on Jersey. In April 1771, after a six-month leave of absence from the army, Erskine, along with his wife Frances, rejoined his regiment in Minorca, and were there for two years. While he was stationed in Jersey and Minorca, Erskine had on occasion preached sermons to his men, prompting one biographer to say that "a taste for oratory that ultimately would lead on to his true career originated in those soldier sermons". He also demonstrated his future skills as an advocate in a pamphlet entitled "Observations on the Prevailing Abuses in the British Army Arising from the Corruption of Civil Government with a Proposal toward Obtaining an Addition to Their Pay". Whilst on leave in London, the charming and well-connected young officer was able to mix in literary circles and met Dr Johnson. James Boswell, in his Life of Johnson, recalled meeting "a young officer in the regimentals of the Scots royal, who talked with a vivacity, fluency and precision so uncommon, that he attracted particular attention. He proved to be the Honorable Thomas Erskine, youngest brother to the Earl of Buchan, who has since risen into such brilliant reputation at the Bar in Westminster-hall". Although Erskine was appointed a lieutenant in April 1773, he decided to leave the army and, with the encouragement of his family and Lord Mansfield, study for the Bar.

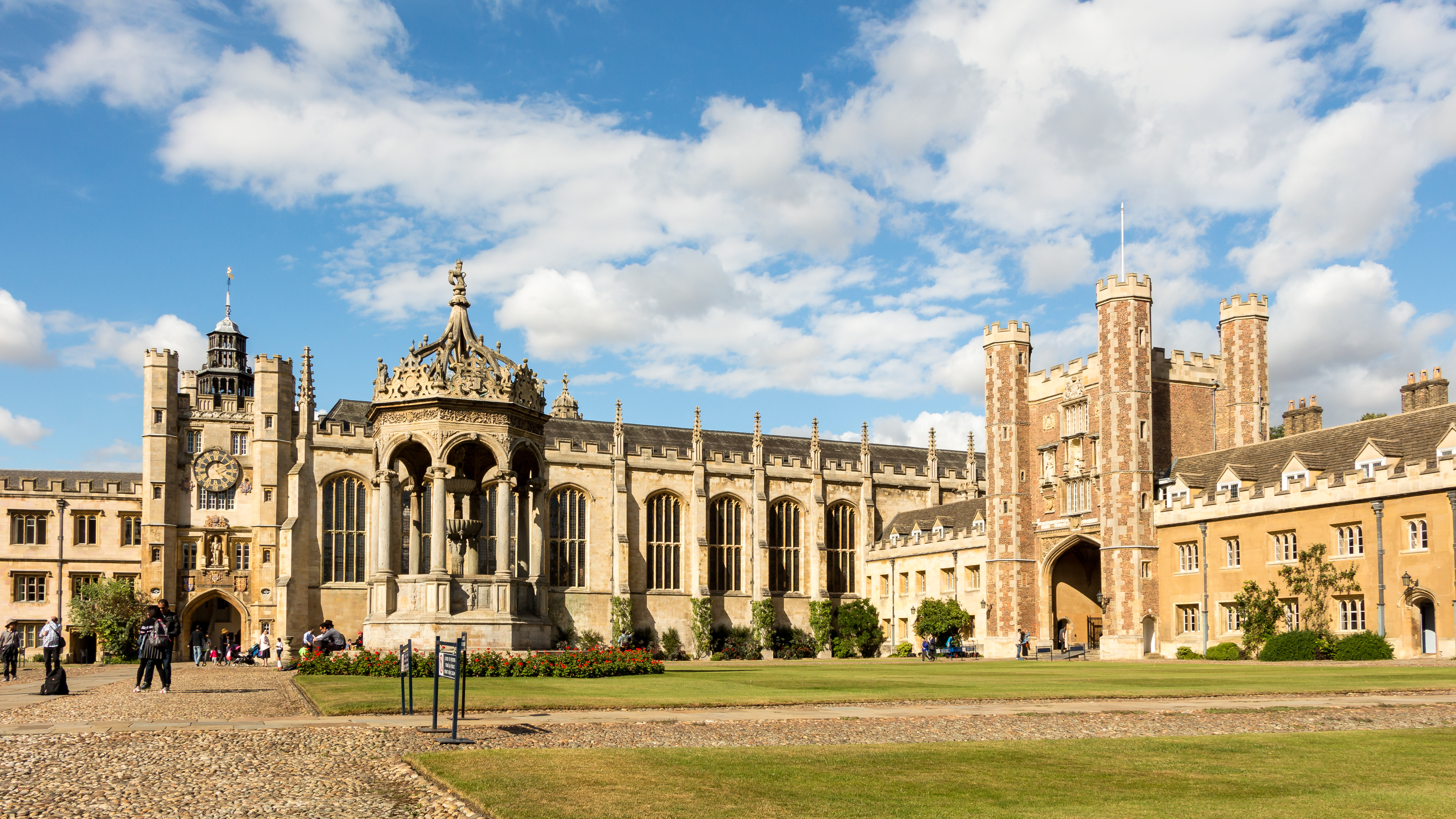
Erskine studied at Trinity College, Cambridge

Erskine was admitted as a student of Lincoln's Inn on 26 April 1775. He discovered that the period of study required before being called to the Bar could be reduced from five years to three for holders of a degree from Oxford or Cambridge universities. He therefore, on 13 January 1776, entered himself as a gentleman commoner on the books of Trinity College, Cambridge where, as the son of an earl, he was entitled to gain a degree without sitting any examinations. He did however win the English declamation prize for an oration on the "glorious revolution" of 1688. At the same time, he was a pupil in the chambers of first Francis Buller and then George Wood. These were years of poverty for Erskine and his growing family: he installed his wife Frances and the children in cheap lodgings in Kentish Town and survived on a gift of £300 from a relative, and the sale of his army commission. Jeremy Bentham, who knew Erskine at this time, described him as "so shabbily dressed as to be quite remarkable".

== Early legal and political career ==
In the summer of 1778 Erskine was awarded a degree and was called to the Bar on 3 July. While many newly qualified barristers, especially those without contacts to put briefs their way, took years to establish themselves, Erskine's success was immediate and brilliant. His first case, that of Thomas Baillie, came to him by chance. The case involved the Greenwich Hospital for Seamen, of which Captain Baillie was lieutenant-governor. Baillie had uncovered abuses in the management of the hospital and, having failed to interest the directors and governors of the hospital or the lords of the Admiralty, he published a pamphlet and was then sued by the agents of John Montagu, 4th Earl of Sandwich who was first lord of the Admiralty and had been placing his agents in positions of authority in the hospital. Hearing of a newly qualified barrister who had himself been a seaman and was sympathetic to his cause, Baillie appointed Erskine to his team although he already had four counsel. Erskine was the most junior, but it was his brilliant speech that won the case and exonerated Baillie. Despite a warning from the judge, Erskine attacked Lord Sandwich calling him "the dark mover behind the scene of iniquity". After his success in the Baillie case, Erskine had no shortage of work and a few months later was retained by Admiral Augustus Keppel in his court martial at Portsmouth. Keppel was acquitted and gave Erskine £1,000 in gratitude. For the first time in his life Erskine was financially secure.

In 1781 Erskine had his first opportunity to address a jury when he defended Lord George Gordon who had been charged with high treason for instigating the anti-Catholic riots of 1780. Erskine's defence not only achieved Gordon's acquittal but also dealt a blow to the English legal doctrine of constructive treason. The case established Erskine as the country's most successful barrister. By 1783, when he received a patent of precedence, he had earned enough to pay off all his debts and accumulate £8–9,000. He could afford a country house, Evergreen Villa, in Hampstead as well as a house in Lincoln's Inn Fields.

In 1783, when the Fox-North Coalition came into power, Erskine entered parliament as Whig member for Portsmouth. Erskine's friend Charles James Fox had been eager to have such a brilliant lawyer join the ranks of Whig members, but Erskine's speeches failed to make the impact in parliament that they did in court. Erskine lost his seat the following year in the general election, becoming one of "Fox's martyrs" when Pitt's party made large gains, although he would regain the seat in 1790.

== Defending radicals and reformers ==
The loss of his parliamentary seat enabled Erskine to concentrate on his legal practice. In 1786, when he was thirty-six years old and had been practising at the Bar for only eight years, he was able to write: "I continue highly successful in my profession, being now, I may say, as high as I can go at the Bar. The rest depends on politics, which at present are adverse." Amongst his notable cases in 1780s was his successful defence of William Davies Shipley, dean of St Asaph (and son of Jonathan Shipley) who was tried in 1784 at Shrewsbury for seditious libel for publishing Principles of Government, in a Dialogue between a Gentleman and a Farmer, a tract by his brother-in-law Sir William Jones advancing radical views on the relationship between subjects and the state. Erskine's defence anticipated the Libel Act 1792 (32 Geo. 3. c. 60), which laid down the principle that it is for the jury (who previously had only decided the question of publication) and not the judge to decide whether or not a publication is a libel.

In 1789 he was counsel for John Stockdale, a bookseller, who was charged with seditious libel in publishing John Logan's pamphlet in support of Warren Hastings, whose impeachment was then proceeding. Erskine's speech, which resulted in the Stockdale's acquittal, argued that a defendant should not be convicted if his composition, taken as a whole, did not go beyond a free and fair discussion, even if selected passages might be libellous. Henry Brougham considered this to be one of Erskine's finest speeches: "It is justly regarded, by all English lawyers, as a consummate specimen of the art of addressing a jury".

Three years later he would, against the advice of his friends, take on the defence of Thomas Paine who had been charged with seditious libel after the publication of the second part of his Rights of Man. Paine was tried in his absence; he was in France. Erskine argued for the right of a people to criticise, reform and change its government; he made the point that a free press produces security in the government. But in this case his arguments failed to convince the special jury, who returned a verdict of guilty without even retiring. Erskine's speech is also remembered for a passage on the duty of barristers to take on even unpopular cases:

I will for ever, at all hazards, assert the dignity, independence, and integrity of the English Bar, without which impartial justice, the most valuable part of the English constitution, can have no existence. From the moment that any advocate can be permitted to say that he will or will not stand between the Crown and the subject arraigned in the court where he daily sits to practise, from that moment the liberties of England are at an end.

Erskine's decision to defend Paine cost him his position as attorney-general (legal advisor) to the Prince of Wales, to which he had been appointed in 1786.

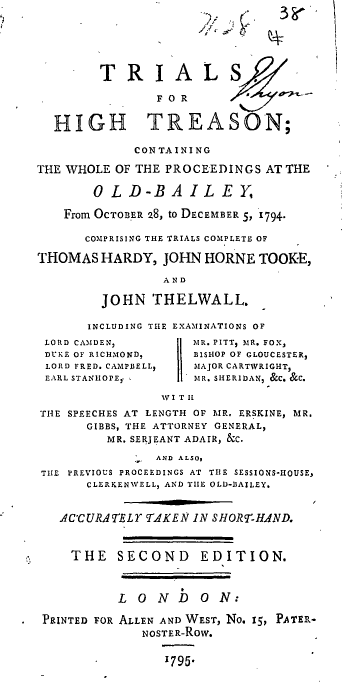
Erskine was counsel for the defence in the treason trials

In 1794 William Pitt's government, fearful of a revolution, decided to take action against people who were campaigning for parliamentary reform. Habeas corpus was suspended and twelve members of radical societies were imprisoned and charged with a variety of offences amounting to high treason. Erskine and Vicary Gibbs were assigned as counsel to seven of them. They were not paid for their services, as it was considered unprofessional to take fees for defending people charged with high treason. The treason trials began on 28 October before Lord Chief Justice Eyre at the Old Bailey with the trial of Thomas Hardy, a shoemaker and secretary of the London Corresponding Society. After eight days of evidence and speeches, including Erskine's seven-hour speech on the final day, and several hours deliberation, the jury returned a verdict of not guilty. Erskine was hailed as a hero by the crowds outside who unharnessed his horses (which he never saw again) and pulled his carriage through the streets. Although it was usual in cases where several people were jointly charged with high treason to discharge the rest if the first was acquitted, the government persisted with the trials of John Horne Tooke and John Thelwall. They too, defended by Erskine and Vicary Gibbs, were acquitted and it was only then that the prosecution was halted. A disappointed government had to scrap a further 800 warrants of arrest. In 1800, the owner of the Manor of Hartshorne, Derbyshire, William Bailey Cant, left it to Erskine, in recognition of his role in these cases.

Notable amongst the later cases of Erskine's career was that of James Hadfield, a former soldier who had fired a shot at the king in Drury Lane Theatre. The shot missed and Hadfield was charged with treason. Erskine called a large number of witnesses who testified to Hadfield's sometimes bizarre behaviour, a surgeon who testified to the nature of the head injuries that Hadfield had sustained in battle, and a doctor, Alexander Crichton, who gave evidence that Hadfield was insane. Erskine argued that, although Hadfield could appear rational, he was in the grip of a delusion and could not control his actions. He summed up: "I must convince you, not only that the unhappy prisoner was a lunatic, within my own definition of lunacy, but that the act in question was the immediate unqualified offspring of the disease". The judge, Lord Kenyon, was convinced by Erskine's evidence and argument and stopped the trial, acquitted Hadfield and ordered him to be detained. The trial led to two acts of parliament: the Criminal Lunatics Act 1800 which provided for the detention of people who were acquitted of a crime by reason of insanity, and the Treason Act 1800.

== Lord Chancellor ==
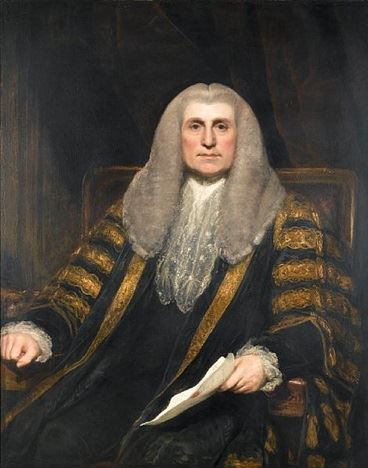
Lord Erskine as Lord Chancellor.

In 1806 Erskine was offered the Lord Chancellorship in the Ministry of All the Talents formed by Lord Grenville and Charles Fox on the death of William Pitt. Fox's original plan had been to offer Erskine the chief judgeship of the Common Pleas or the King's Bench when one of the holders was elevated to Lord Chancellor. But both Lord Ellenborough, chief justice of the King's Bench and Sir James Mansfield, Chief Justice of the Common Pleas, declined the chancellorship. Erskine was therefore appointed although he had no experience in Chancery. He was created a peer on 10 February 1806 to become Lord Chancellor. The Prince of Wales, who had inherited the Duchy of Cornwall, chose Erskine's title, Baron Erskine, of Restormel Castle in the County of Cornwall, while the motto, "trial by jury" was Erskine's own. Frances Erskine did not live to enjoy the title of Lady Erskine; she died a few weeks before her husband took the seals of office.

Although Erskine lacked experience in equity, only one of the judgements he made during his brief tenure as Lord Chancellor was appealed against and that, concerning Peter Thellusson's will, was upheld. His handling of the impeachment of Lord Melville was generally admired. Along with Lords Grenville, Spencer and Ellenborough, Erskine was commissioned by the king to enquire into the morals of his daughter-in-law Caroline of Brunswick in what became known as the "delicate investigation".

Erskine was Lord Chancellor for only fourteen months, having to give up the seals of office when the Ministry of All the Talents resigned over a disagreement with the king concerning the question of Catholic emancipation. The king gave Erskine a week to finish pending cases, and Erskine took advantage of this to appoint one of his sons-in-law, Edward Morris, as master of Chancery.

== Retirement and second marriage ==
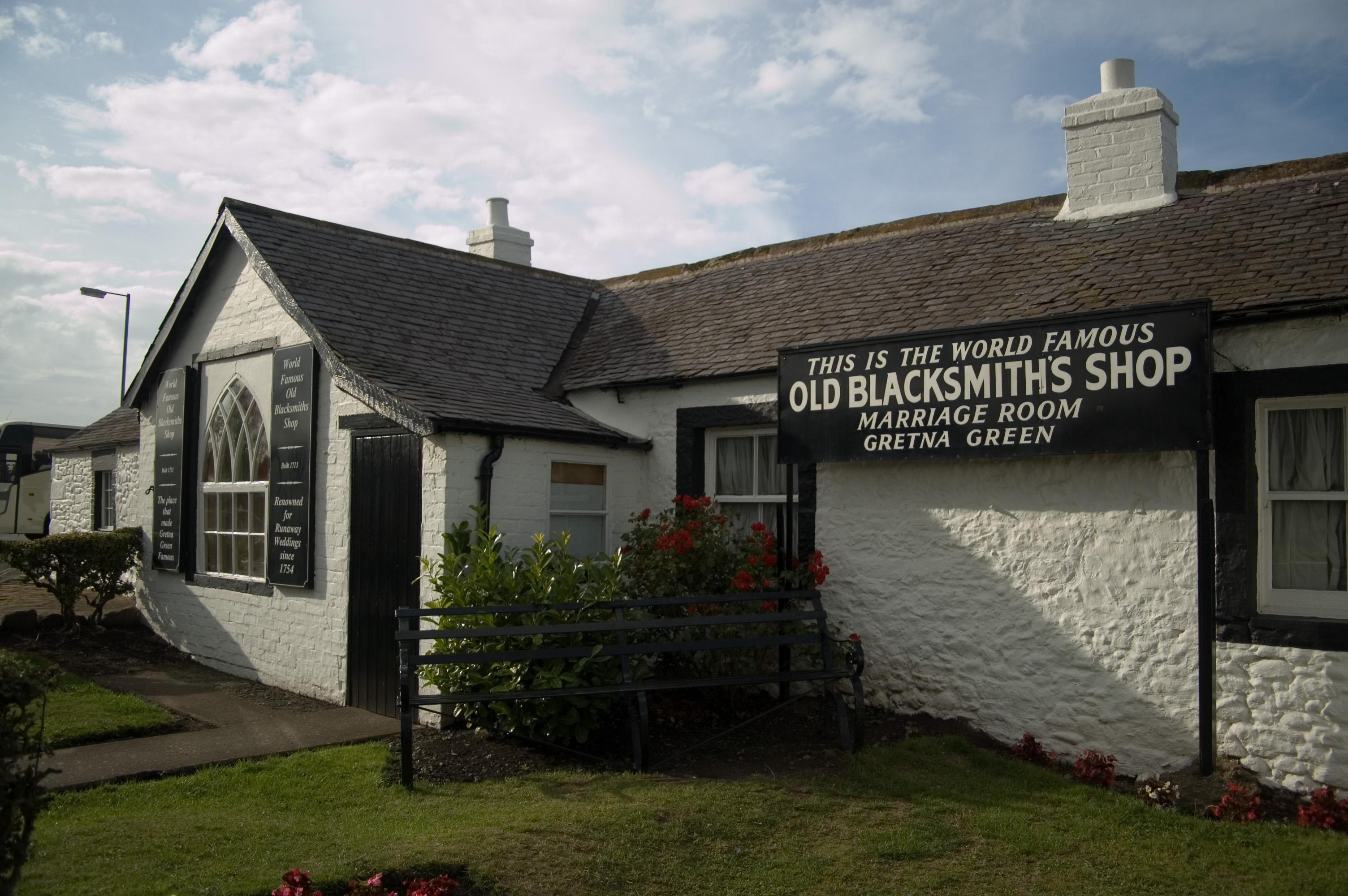
Erskine married for a second time at Gretna Green

As ex-chancellor, Erskine was not permitted to return to the Bar. He was awarded a pension of £4000 a year and remained a member of the House of Lords. He was only 57 when the Ministry of All the Talents fell, and hoped that he might return to office when the Prince of Wales became regent. In the event, however, the regent retained the ministry of Spencer Perceval and the Whigs would not be in power again until 1830, seven years after Erskine's death. Erskine largely retired from public life, rarely speaking in the House of Lords. In 1818 he married for the second time. His bride was a former apprentice bonnet-maker, Sarah Buck, with whom he had already had four children. The couple travelled to Gretna Green for the marriage, with an angry adult son in hot pursuit. It was a tempestuous relationship, and the marriage ended in separation a few years later. In spite of his generous pension and the enormous sums he had earned at the Bar, Erskine experienced financial difficulties in his later years, having to sell his villa in Hampstead and move to a house in Pimlico. He also bought an estate in Sussex, but his agricultural efforts were not a great success. He wrote a political romance, Armata, which ran to several editions.

Causes which Erskine took up in his retirement were animal welfare, Greek independence, and the defence of Queen Caroline. He had always been an animal lover; amongst his favourite animals were a Newfoundland dog called Toss who used to accompany him to chambers, a macaw, a goose and two leeches. He introduced a bill in the House of Lords for the prevention of cruelty to animals, arguing that humanity's dominion over them was given by God as a moral trust. It was the first time he had proposed a change in the law. The bill was accepted in the Lords but opposed in the Commons; William Windham argued that a law against cruelty to animals was incompatible with fox-hunting and horse racing. Eventually the bill was introduced in the Commons and passed as the Cruel Treatment of Cattle Act 1822. When Caroline was being prosecuted for divorce Erskine spoke against the Bill of Pains and Penalties and, when the government dropped the bill, expressed his approval: "My Lords, I am an old man, and my life, whether it has been for good or evil, has been passed under the sacred rule of Law. In this moment I feel my strength renovated by that rule being restored". He was invited to a public dinner in Edinburgh in February 1820, and made his first trip to Scotland since he had left it on the Tartar over fifty years before.

In 1823 Erskine set out by sea on another visit to Scotland with one of his sons, hoping to see his brother the Earl of Buchan. But he became ill with a chest infection on the journey and was put ashore at Scarborough. He managed to travel to the home of his brother Henry's widow in Almondell in West Lothian, where they were joined by the Earl. He died at Almondell on 17 November 1823 and was buried in the family burial-place at Uphall in West Lothian. His widow survived him by over thirty years. She, as reports in The Times revealed, was reduced to poverty and had to rely on a small charitable allowance to survive. Even these meagre payments were withheld by Erskine's executors when she tried to prevent them sending her son Hampden away to school, and she had to appeal to the lord mayor of London. She died in 1856.

== Family ==
On 29 March 1770 Erskine married Frances Moore, against the wishes of her father, Daniel Moore, who was member of parliament for Great Marlowe. Frances was the granddaughter of John Moore, who had been attorney general of Pennsylvania. Before meeting Frances, Erskine had written about the qualities he was looking for in a bride: "Let then my ornament be far from the tinsel glare, let it be fair yet modest, let it rather delight than dazzle, rather shine like the mild beams of the morning than the blaze of the noon. I seek in my fair one a winning female softness both in person and mind". Erskine appears to have found these qualities in Frances: she is described on her memorial in Hampstead Church as "the most faithful and affectionate of women". The couple produced four sons and three daughters:

- David Montagu Erskine (1776–1855) was a member of parliament and diplomat
- Henry David (1786–1859) was Dean of Ripon
- Thomas (1788–1864) became a judge of the Court of Common Pleas
- Esmé Steuart (1789–1817) fought at the Battle of Waterloo where he lost an arm (his widow Eliza married Admiral James Norton, who also lost an arm in action)
- Frances (died 1859) married Samuel Holland, Precentor of Chichester and Rector of Poynings, Sussex (a grandson of Frances and Samuel was the jurist Thomas Erskine Holland)
- Elizabeth (died 1800) married her cousin Captain (later Sir) David Erskine, the illegitimate son of the 11th Earl of Buchan;
- Mary (1784–1804) married lawyer Edward Morris.

With his second wife Sarah Buck, Erskine had four children:

- Erskine Thomas (1809–1893) was an officer in the Bengal Army and emigrated to New Zealand after his retirement
- Alfred (1810–1830) died at his father's residence in Arabella Row
- Agnes Sarah Steuart (1812–1883) emigrated to New Zealand with her brother and his family
- John Hampden (1817–1837) died of tuberculosis

Erskine's eldest brother, the 11th Earl of Buchan, had no legitimate sons and was succeeded by a nephew, the son of Erskine's brother Henry. When all Henry's descendants in the direct male line died out in 1960 the seventh Baron Erskine (Donald Cardross Flower Erskine, Erskine's great-great-great-grandson) became the sixteenth Earl of Buchan.

== Bibliography ==
- J Hostettler 1996 Thomas Erskine and trial by jury. Chichester: Barry Rose Law Publishers Ltd ISBN 1-872328-23-7
- JA Lovat-Fraser 1932 Erskine. Cambridge: Cambridge University Press
- Stryker, Lloyd Paul (1949). For the defence: Thomas Erskine, one of the most enlightened men of his times, 1750–1823. London: Staples Press Ltd.
- R Ormrod 1977 The McNaughton case and its predecessors. In DJ West and A Walk (eds.) Daniel McNaughton: his trial and the aftermath. London: Gaskell Books, 4–11
- RG Thorne 2006 Erskine, Hon. Thomas in RG Thorne (ed.) The History of Parliament: The House of Commons 1790–1820 volume iii, Members A-F: 710–13. Melton: Boydell and Brewer ISBN 978-0-436-52101-0

Parliament of Great Britain
Preceded by William Cornwallis; Sir Henry Fetherstonhaugh, Bt	Member of Parliament for Portsmouth; 1790 – 1800; With: Sir Henry Fetherstonhaugh, Bt to 1796; Lord Hugh Seymour from 1796	Parliament of Great Britain abolished
Parliament of the United Kingdom
New creation Parliament of the United Kingdom established	Member of Parliament for Portsmouth; 1801–1806; With: John Markham	Succeeded by David Montagu Erskine; John Markham
Political offices
Preceded by The Lord Eldon	Lord High Chancellor of Great Britain; 1806–1807	Succeeded by The Lord Eldon
Peerage of the United Kingdom
New creation	Baron Erskine; 1806–1823	Succeeded by David Montagu Erskine
