= Henry Erskine, 12th Earl of Buchan =

Scottish peer (1783–1857)

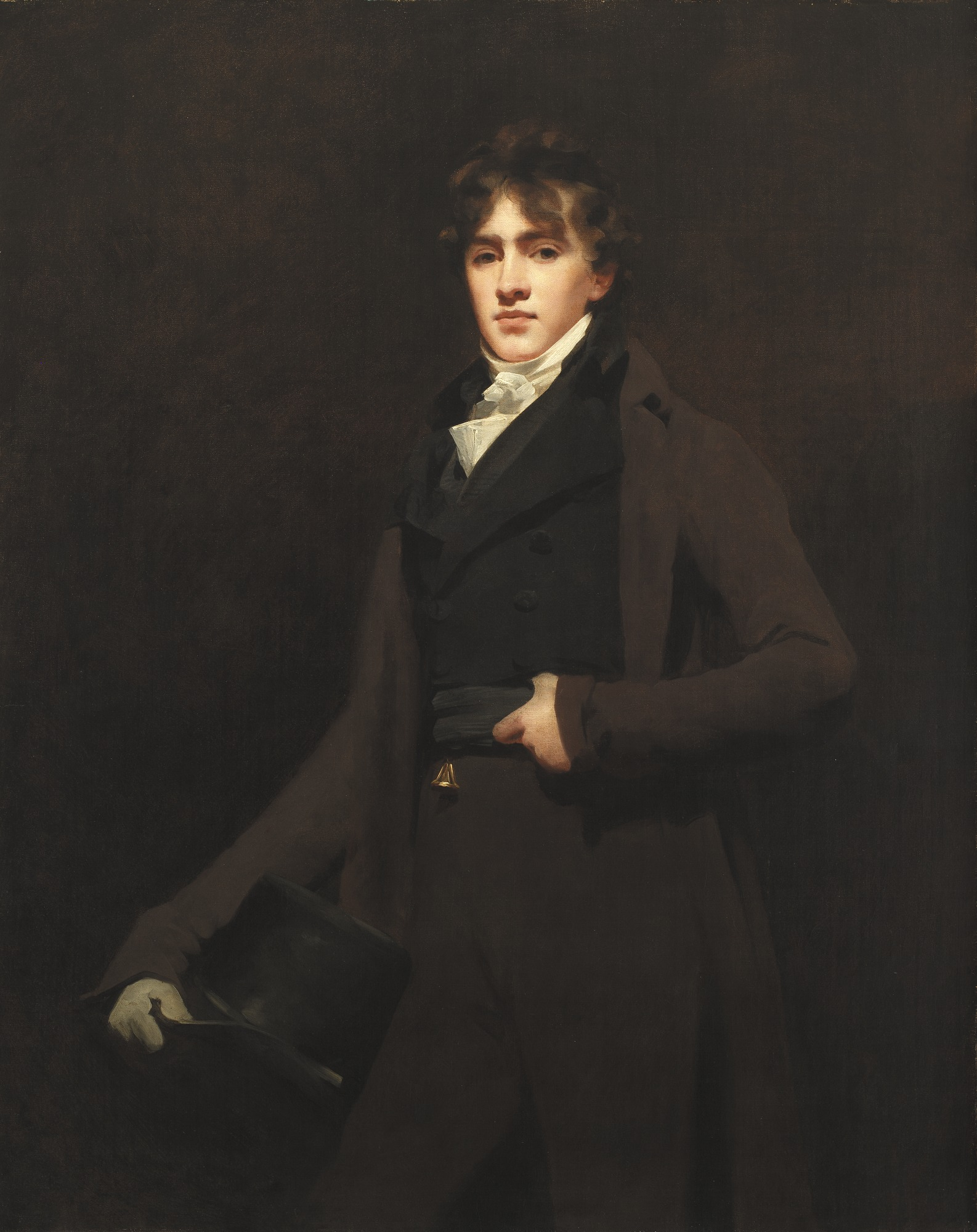
Henry David Erskine, 12th Earl of Buchan, painting by Henry Raeburn, 1805.

Henry David Erskine, 12th Earl of Buchan (July 1783 – 13 September 1857) was a Scottish peer. He was the son of Hon. Henry Erskine, and grandson of the 10th Earl of Buchan. He inherited the Earldom upon the death of his uncle, David Erskine, 11th Earl of Buchan who died without issue.

On 28 September 1809, he married Elizabeth Cole Shipley (c. 1792–1828), daughter of Maj.-Gen. Sir Charles Shipley. They had one child, David Stuart Erskine, 13th Earl of Buchan (1815–1898). After Lady Buchan's death he twice remarried but had no further issue.

In 1833 he was living at 47 Minto Street in southern Edinburgh. The primary residence of the Earl was Kirkhill House in Broxburn, West Lothian. The Earl inherited the property from his uncle, the 11th Earl. He died on 13 September 1857 at his London residence. He was interred at Ripon Cathedral.

Masonic offices
Preceded by The Lord Kinnaird	Grand Master of the Grand Lodge of Scotland; 1832–1833	Succeeded by Marquess of Douglas
Peerage of Scotland
Preceded by David Erskine	Earl of Buchan; 1829–1857	Succeeded by David Erskine
