= Thomas Erskine (judge) =

English judge

Thomas Erskine PC

Justice of the Common Pleas
- In office 9 January 1839 – November 1842

Chief Judge of the Court of Review in Bankruptcy
- In office 20 October 1831 – November 1842

Personal details
- Born: March 12, 1788 Fleet Street, London, England
- Died: November 9, 1864 (aged 76) Bournemouth, England
- Spouse: Henrietta Traill
- Occupation: judge, lawyer

Thomas Erskine, PC (12 March 1788 – 9 November 1864) was an English judge.

== Biography ==
The son of Thomas Erskine, 1st Baron Erskine, by his first wife, Frances, daughter of Daniel Moore, Thomas Erskine was born 12 March 1788 at 10 Serjeants' Inn, Fleet Street. He was brought up at Hampstead and educated at the grammar school there, and at John Foothead's, and was afterwards under Drs. Drury and Butler at Harrow School, where he was a schoolfellow of Robert Peel, Lord Aberdeen, Lord Palmerston, Lord Byron, and Theodore Hook. On becoming Lord Chancellor his father made him, still a schoolboy, his secretary of presentations, which threw him much into fashionable society. He was entered at Trinity College, Cambridge in 1808, and being a peer's son graduated MA without residence or examination in 1811, on the inauguration of the Duke of Gloucester as Chancellor.

In 1807 he was entered at Lincoln's Inn, and became a pupil of Joseph Chitty. He became a special pleader in 1810, and practised with success; was called to the bar in 1813, and having first joined the home circuit transferred himself to the Western Circuit. He contested Lewes unsuccessfully as a Whig in 1818. He became a King's Counsel in 1827, and took a leading place on his circuit. He was clear and acute rather than rhetorical, and had a strong comprehension of technicalities, being thus in sharp contrast to his father.

The Bankruptcy Act, 1 and 2 Wm. IV, c. 56, established a Court of Review in Bankruptcy of four judges, and Lord Brougham appointed him to the chief judgeship on 20 Oct. 1831, a post which he filled with credit. He was also sworn of the Privy Council. On the death of James Allan Park, he succeeded him, 9 January 1839, as a Justice of the Common Pleas, but continued to hold his bankruptcy judgeship until November 1842. In his new capacity his chief act was presiding at the spring assizes at York in 1840, at the political trials, which he did so fairly as to receive the applause even of the Northern Star, Feargus O'Connor's paper.

In 1844 he was attacked by tubercular disease of the lungs, and resigned his judgeship in November, but lived, for the most part an invalid, until 9 November 1864, when he died at Bournemouth. From the summer of 1852 he lived at Fir Grove, Eversley, and was the intimate friend and valued supporter of the rector, Charles Kingsley, to whom his death was a great loss. He was till his death a commissioner for the Duchy of Cornwall, and in 1840 was president of the Trinitarian Bible Society. He married in 1814 Henrietta, daughter of Henry Traill of Darsie, Fifeshire, and had a large family.
