= Henry Erskine, 10th Earl of Buchan =

Scottish peer (1710–1767)

The Right Honourable The Earl of Buchan FRS
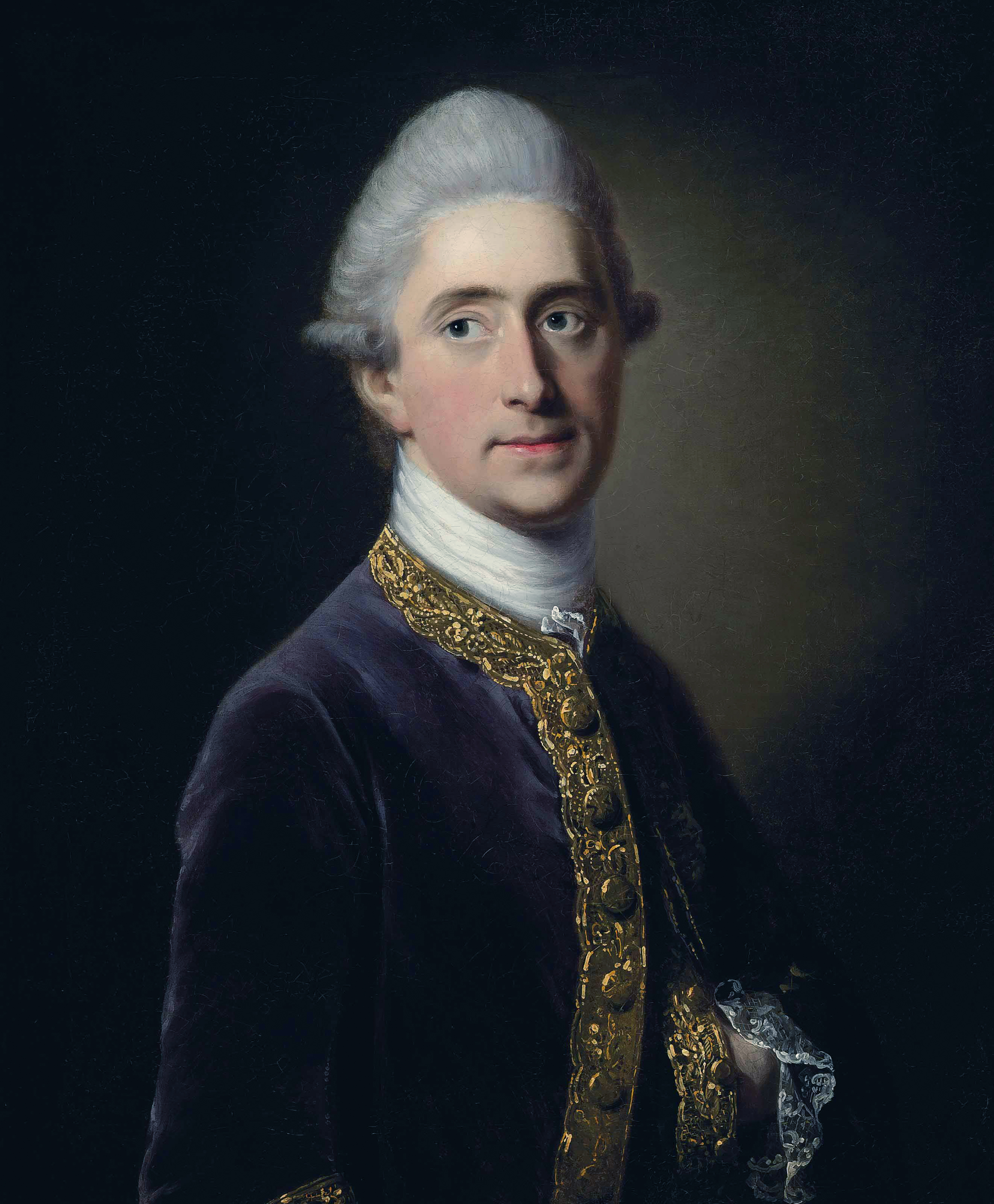
- Born: 17 April 1710; Scotland
- Died: 1 December 1767 (aged 57); Walcot, Bath, England
- Burial place: Holyrood Abbey, Edinburgh
- Spouse: Agnes Steuart
- Children: Anne, David, Henry, Thomas, and 1 other son and daughter
- Parent(s): David Erskine, 9th Earl of Buchan; Frances Fairfax

Henry David Erskine, 10th Earl of Buchan, FRS (17 April 1710 – 1 December 1767), styled Lord Auchterhouse until 1745, was a Scottish peer.

Buchan was the eldest surviving son of David Erskine, 9th Earl of Buchan, by Frances, daughter of Henry Fairfax (a grandson of Thomas Fairfax, 1st Viscount Fairfax). He was elected a Fellow of the Royal Society in 1734. A freemason, he was Grand Master of the Grand Lodge of Scotland between 1745 and 1746.

Lord Buchan married Agnes, daughter of Sir James Steuart, 7th Baronet, on 31 January 1739. His elder daughter was Lady Anne Agnes Erskine who was involved with the evangelical Methodists of Countess of Huntingdon's Connexion. This resulted in part from caring for her father at the end of his life. They had five other children:

- David Erskine, Lord Cardross (1741–1747)
- David Stewart Erskine, 11th Earl of Buchan (b.1 June 1742; d.19 April 1829)
- Hon. Henry Erskine (b. 1 November 1746; d.1817), the father of Henry Erskine, 12th Earl of Buchan
- Thomas Erskine, 1st Baron Erskine (b.10 January 1750; d.1823)
- Lady Isabella Erskine (d. 1824)

Lord Buchan died at Walcot, Somerset, on 1 December 1767, aged 57, and his funeral was conducted by George Whitefield. He was succeeded in the earldom by his second but eldest surviving son, David. The Countess of Buchan died at Edinburgh, Scotland, in December 1778, aged 61.

Masonic offices
Preceded by The Earl of Moray	Grand Master of the Grand Lodge of Scotland; 1745–1746	Succeeded by William Nisbet
Peerage of Scotland
Preceded by David Erskine	Earl of Buchan; 1745–1767	Succeeded by David Steuart Erskine
