= Henry Erskine (lawyer) =

British politician and lawyer (1746–1817)

The Honourable Henry Erskine
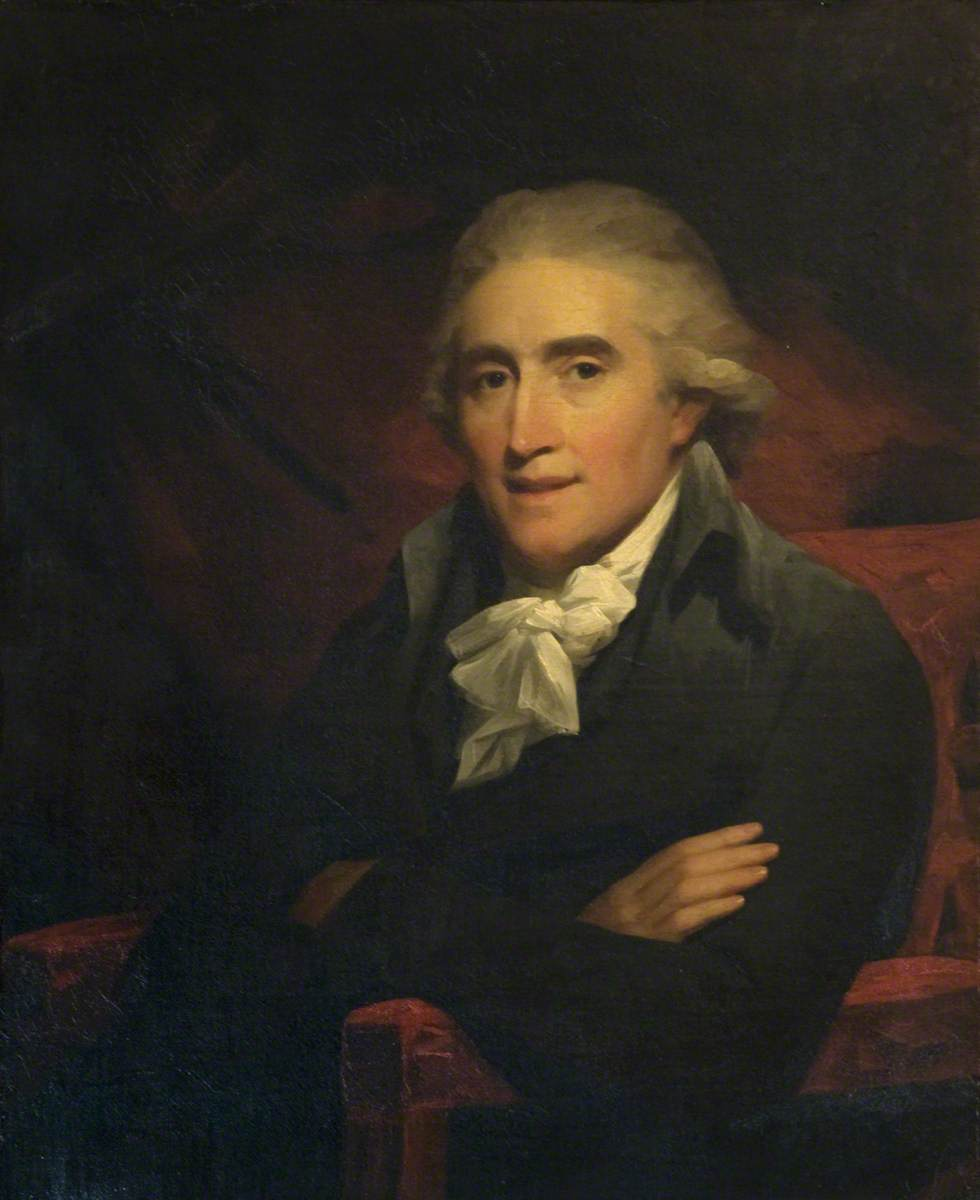
- The Hon Henry Erskine by Henry Raeburn

Lord Advocate
- In office 1783–1783
- Monarch: George III
- Prime Minister: The Duke of Portland
- Preceded by: Henry Dundas
- Succeeded by: Ilay Campbell
- In office 1806–1807
- Monarch: George III
- Prime Minister: The Lord Grenville
- Preceded by: Sir James Montgomery, Bt
- Succeeded by: Archibald Colquhoun

Personal details
- Born: 1 November 1746
- Died: 8 October 1817 (aged 70)
- Spouse(s): (1) Christian Fullerton (d. 1804) (2) Erskine Munro
- Education: St Andrews University; University of Edinburgh; University of Glasgow

The Honourable Henry Erskine (1 November 1746 – 8 October 1817) was a Scottish advocate and British Whig politician.

== Background and education ==
Erskine was the third but second surviving son of Agnes, daughter of Sir James Steuart, 7th Baronet and his wife Anne (1687-1736), and Henry Erskine, 10th Earl of Buchan. He was the brother of David Erskine, 11th Earl of Buchan, and Lord Chancellor Thomas Erskine, 1st Baron Erskine. His elder sister was Lady Anne Agnes Erskine who was involved with the evangelical methodists of Countess of Huntingdon's Connexion. He was educated at the University of St Andrews (1760-1764), the University of Glasgow (1764-1766) and then to the University of Edinburgh in 1766. He was described as "a tall and rather slender figure, a face sparkling with vivacity, a clear sweet voice, and general suffusion of elegance".

== Legal and political career ==
Erskine is considered the lawyer who effectively created the modern adversarial. He was considered a legendary orator compared by his contemporaries to Cicero.

Erskine served as Lord Advocate from 1783 to 1784 in the Fox-North Coalition and again from 1806 to 1807 in the Ministry of All the Talents. He was advocate and state councillor to the Prince of Wales in Scotland from 1783. He was Dean of the Faculty of Advocates from 1785 to 1795, but was not re-elected in 1796, due to his opposition to the war. Lord Cockburn, commenting on his replacement, observed that "it was the Faculty of Advocates alone that suffered". Robert Burns wrote a ballad memorializing the vote entitled, "The Dean of Faculty". In 1788, Erskine had the unenviable task of defending the celebrated Edinburgh thief Deacon Brodie. Despite his best efforts, Brodie was sentenced to death.

He led a campaign which resulted in the political reformer Thomas Muir being expelled from the Faculty of Advocates but offered to defend Muir free of charge when he was brought to trial for sedition on 30 August 1793.

In 1795 he was living at 68 Princes Street facing Edinburgh Castle having moved there from George Square.

Erskine sat as Member of Parliament for Haddington Burghs from April to November 1806, and for Dumfries Burghs from 1806 to 1807. He was appointed as a Commissioner to inquire into administration of justice in Scotland in 1808. In 1811 he gave up his practice at the bar and retired to his country residence of Almondell, in Linlithgowshire. It was said of him that "no poor man wanted a friend while Harry Erskine lived." He published The Emigrant, an Eclogue, 1773 and other poems.

== Family ==
Erskine married firstly Christian, daughter of George Fullerton, in 1772. They lived at Shoemakers Close on the Canongate. They had two sons and two daughters. Their eldest son, Henry, succeeded as 12th Earl of Buchan on his uncle's death in 1829. After Christian's death in May 1804 Erskine married as his second wife Erskine, daughter of Alexander Munro and widow of Sir James Turnbull, in 1805. This marriage was childless. Henry Erskine died in October 1817, aged 70. A bust of Erskine by Peter Turnerelli stands in Parliament Hall in Edinburgh.

Parliament of the United Kingdom
Preceded by Sir John Hamilton-Dalrymple, Bt	Member of Parliament for Haddington Burghs; 1806	Succeeded by Hon. William Lamb
Preceded by Viscount Stopford	Member of Parliament for Dumfries Burghs; 1806–1807	Succeeded by Sir John Heron-Maxwell, Bt
Legal offices
Preceded by Henry Dundas	Lord Advocate; 1783	Succeeded by Ilay Campbell
Preceded by Sir James Montgomery, Bt	Lord Advocate; 1806–1807	Succeeded by Archibald Colquhoun
