= Anne Erskine =

Scottish aristocrat (1739–1804)

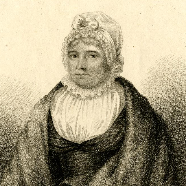
- 1824 etching by Joseph Cross after John Arthur Cahusac
- Born: 1739; Edinburgh, Scotland
- Died: 5 October 1804 (aged 64–65); London, England
- Education: home schooled
- Occupation: administrator

Lady Anne Agnes Erskine (1739 – 5 October 1804) was a Scottish aristocrat and friend and trustee of Selina, Countess of Huntingdon. She became an important figure in the Countess of Huntingdon's Connexion which was a group of churches which still survives.

== Life ==
Erskine was born in Edinburgh in 1739. the eldest child of Agnes and Henry David Erskine, 10th Earl of Buchan (1710–1767). Her mother was the daughter of Sir James Stewart, 1st Baronet (1681–1727), of Goodtrees. Her brothers were David Erskine, 11th Earl of Buchan, who founded the Society of Antiquaries of Scotland; Hon. Henry Erskine, a lawyer, and Thomas Erskine, 1st Baron Erskine, lord chancellor from 1806 to 1807. Her maternal uncle was Sir James Steuart, the Jacobite political economist.

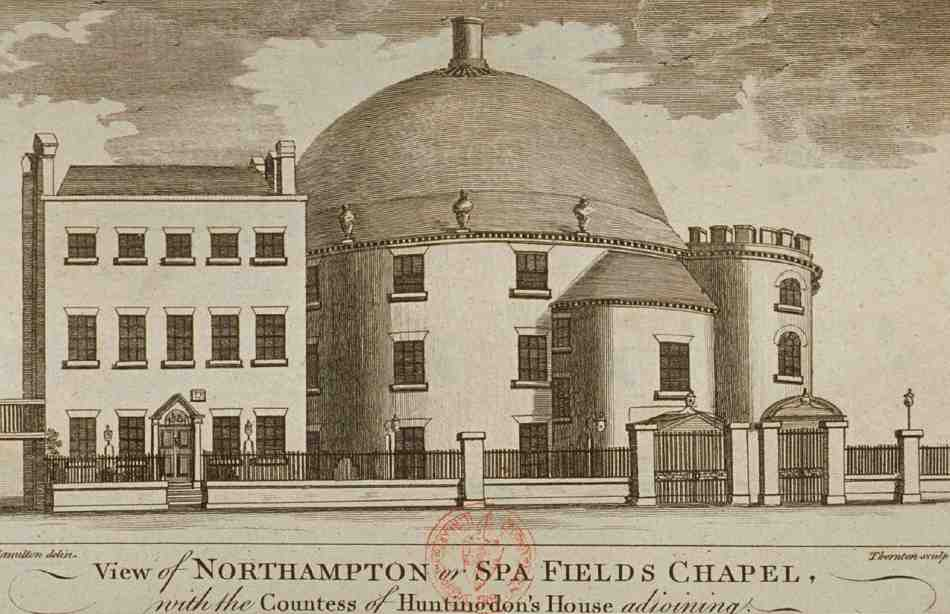
1783 view of what was the Dog and Duck and Spa Fields chapel

She and her brothers were home schooled by their mother in religious household. When she was an adult she became a carer for her father who was living in Walcot. Her paternal grandfather has a friend of Selina the Countess of Huntingdon and George Whitefield who were evangelical methodists. Lady Huntingdon's chapel was used for her father's funeral when he died at the end of 1767. The service was conducted by George Whitefield.

She became Lady Huntingdon's secretary living with her at Spa Fields in Islington. Lady Huntingdon had bought a huge chapel in 1779 which attracted congregations of 2,000, but she called "her private chapel". The building had been built as a Pantheon or theatre-in-the-round and it had a huge dome. Erskine and Huntingdon lived nest door in what had been the Dog and Duck and which had been rebuilt in 1756.

In June 1791 Selina identified four people who would look after her wealth and chapels after she died. Erskine was one of these and Erskine continued to live in their spacious home but she did not have the funds that the Countess had at her disposal to support her work. However the chapels continued and Erskine took over the recruitment of new ministers who were required despite some congregations moving away. Erskine was reliant on grants supplied by the Spa Fields Chapel committee. She died in 1804 in London and she was buried at Bunhill Fields. Her place as a Connexion truste was taken by the Reverend John Ford after her death but it converted to a trust shortly afterwards.

A biography of her was published in 1833, but the Countess did not have one for many more years as she had requested that one should not be written.
