= Charles Shipley =

British Army officer and colonial administrator

Major-General Sir Charles Shipley
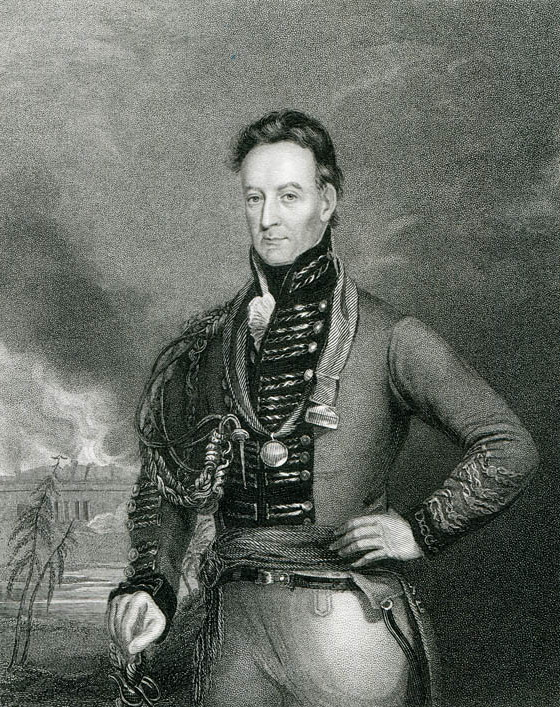
- 1832 portrait
- Born: 18 February 1755; Luton, Bedfordshire
- Died: 30 November 1815 (aged 60); Grenada, British West Indies
- Children: 3

Major-General Sir Charles Shipley (18 February 1755 – 30 November 1815) was a British Army officer and colonial administrator who served as the acting governor of Grenada from 1813 to 1815.

== Early life ==
Shipley was born at Copt Hall, Luton, Bedfordshire, the son of Capt. Richard Shipley, of Stamford, Lincolnshire, a cavalry officer. His mother, born Jane Rudyerd, descended from Benjamin Rudyerd and was a scion of the Maddox baronets.

== Military career ==
After entering the Royal Military Academy at Woolwich at the age of nine, Shipley received in 1771 a commission as ensign and practitioner engineer. The following year he went to Menorca and in 1776 was promoted to be lieutenant and sub-engineer. He returned to England in 1778, and was stationed at Gravesend as an engineer on the staff under Colonel Debbieg, the commanding Royal Engineer of the Chatham or Thames district. From 1780 to 1783, he served in St. Lucia in the Leeward Islands, returning home to be stationed at Dover Castle

In 1788, he again went to the West Indies, stationed at Antigua, but was called home in 1792 to be tried by court-martial for disobedience to regulations for employing his own negroes in Antigua on government fortification work. The court sat at the Horse Guards, found him guilty, and sentenced him to be suspended from rank and pay for twelve months, at the same time stating that they fully recognised that Shipley's departure from regulations did not suggest any corrupt or interested motive.

In 1793, he was promoted to captain and again posted to the West Indies, but was captured by the French corvette Perdrix within a few miles of Barbados. The prisoners were confined in hulks at Guadeloupe and suffered great hardship, but Shipley's wife was set free and eventually managed to secure her husband's freedom.

In 1795 Shipley was promoted to major in the army and in 1796 was appointed commanding Royal Engineer of the Windward and Leeward Islands. In 1797 he accompanied Sir Ralph Abercromby as commanding Royal Engineer on his expedition to Trinidad, which gained possession of the island from the Spanish, and in the unsuccessful attack on Puerto Rico in the following month. In 1798 he was promoted to be lieutenant colonel in the Royal Engineers.

In 1799, Shipley was sent by Lieutenant-general (afterwards Sir) Thomas Trigge in the Amphitrite to survey the coasts in the neighbourhood of the Surinam river to locate a landing-place for a military force to attack Surinam. Surinam surrendered on 20 August 1799 but was soon retaken. Shipley also took part, during March, in the capture of the islands of St. Bartholomew, St. Martin, St. Thomas, and of Santa Cruz. On 21 and 22 June 1803, he commanded a detachment of infantry at the capture of St. Lucia. In April 1804 he accompanied an expedition sent under Brigadier-General (afterwards Sir) Charles Green, temporarily commander in chief in the Leeward Islands, against Dutch Guiana. Shipley landed with Lieutenant Arnold of the Royal Engineers and a small party, to reconnoitre the defences of Surinam, which was again captured. In a dispatch to Lord Camden, Green admitted his obligations to Shipley, as commanding engineer, 'far beyond my power to express.’

In 1805, Shipley was promoted to colonel in the Royal Engineers and, in 1806 brigadier general to the forces serving in the West Indies. In that year, under orders from the Board of Ordnance, he made a circuit of the coast of Jamaica and explored the interior by crossing the island in various directions, almost losing his life in a fast-flowing river. In 1807 he accompanied the expedition from Barbados against the Danish West India islands under General Bowyer and Rear-admiral Sir Alexander Cochrane. They arrived before St. Thomas on 21 December, when Shipley was sent ashore to demand from the governor, von Scholten, the surrender of St. Thomas and St. John, which capitulated the next day. The expedition then sailed for Santa Cruz, and Shipley was again sent on shore to negotiate terms. The governor would only capitulate if some of his officers could be allowed to inspect the British ships and troops, and, having done this, could satisfy his honour that the British force was so strong that resistance would be hopeless. Shipley agreed, the inspection was made, and the island capitulated on 25 December 1807.

On 22 March 1808, Shipley was knighted and in January 1809 took part in the expedition against Martinique under lieutenant-general Sir George Beckwith. He landed on 30 January and commenced operations against Pigeon Island, in which he was admirably supported by Captain (afterwards Sir) George Cockburn of H.M.S. Pompée and his bluejackets. The night after the batteries opened fire, the enemy were obliged to capitulate, and Pigeon Island fell to the British, to be followed by Fort Bourbon and Fort Royal and, on 23 February by the whole island of Martinique. Shipley received the thanks of both Houses of Parliament for his conduct.

In February 1810, he commanded the second division of the army in the successful operations against Guadeloupe. Brigadier-general Harcourt, in his despatch, expressed his indebtedness to Shipley during the operations, and especially in the action at Ridge Beaurepaire, St. Louis, in front of Bellair. Shipley was promoted to major-general and, on 27 February 1813, appointed acting Lieutenant-Governor of Grenada.

After the return to France from Elba of Napoleon Bonaparte, a naval and military expedition, under Admiral Sir Philip Durham and Lieutenant-general Sir James Leith, was sent to secure the French West India islands on behalf of the King of France, against whom they had revolted, and in June 1815 Martinique and Marie Galante were reoccupied without trouble. Guadeloupe, however, held out for Bonaparte, and did not yield without severe fighting. Shipley commanded the first brigade, and the enemy were defeated at all points, after which Guadeloupe surrendered. Both naval and military commanders in their despatches expressed the highest praise of the 'distinguished and indefatigable engineer, Sir Charles Shipley'. Shipley received, by the command of the Prince Regent, a medal for Martinique with a clasp for Guadeloupe, accompanied by a letter from the Duke of York, then commander-in-chief.

In July 1815, Shipley declined promotion out of the corps of Royal Engineers, to which he had belonged all his service, and of which he was senior regimental colonel, preferring to wait for his battalion. However, his exertions at the attack on Guadeloupe had brought on an illness which caused his death in Grenada on 30 November 1815. He was buried in the church of St. George's, Grenada.

== Family ==
Shipley had married, in May 1780, Mary, the daughter of James Teale and a great-granddaughter of Sir Anthony Aucher. Lady Shipley died in Boulogne (where she was assigned a residence by Louis XVIII in consideration of her husband's services in the French West Indies) on 6 August 1820 and was buried in the English burial-ground there; her remains were later removed and reinterred in the cloisters of Canterbury Cathedral. They had three daughters. Their youngest, Elizabeth, married Henry David Erskine, 12th Earl of Buchan.
