= Maddox baronets =

Extinct baronetcy in the Baronetage of England

The Maddox Baronetcy, of Wormley in the County of Hertford, was a title in the Baronetage of England.

The title was created on 11 March 1676 for Benjamin Maddox of Wormley, Hertfordshire, the son of Benjamin Maddox of Boughton Monchelsea, Kent and Mary, daughter of Sir Multon Lambarde of Westcombe, Kent. He married Dorothy, daughter and heir of Sir William Glasscock (d. 1688) of Kings Langley, Herefordshire. The couple had two daughters: Dorothy married Benjamin Rudyeard of West Woodhay and Mary married Edward Pollen of Little Bookham. The title became extinct on Maddox's death on 14 December 1716.

== Maddox baronets, of Wormley (1676) ==
- Sir Benjamin Maddox, 1st Baronet (c. 1638–1716)
